= Japanese cruiser Sakawa =

Agano-class light cruiser

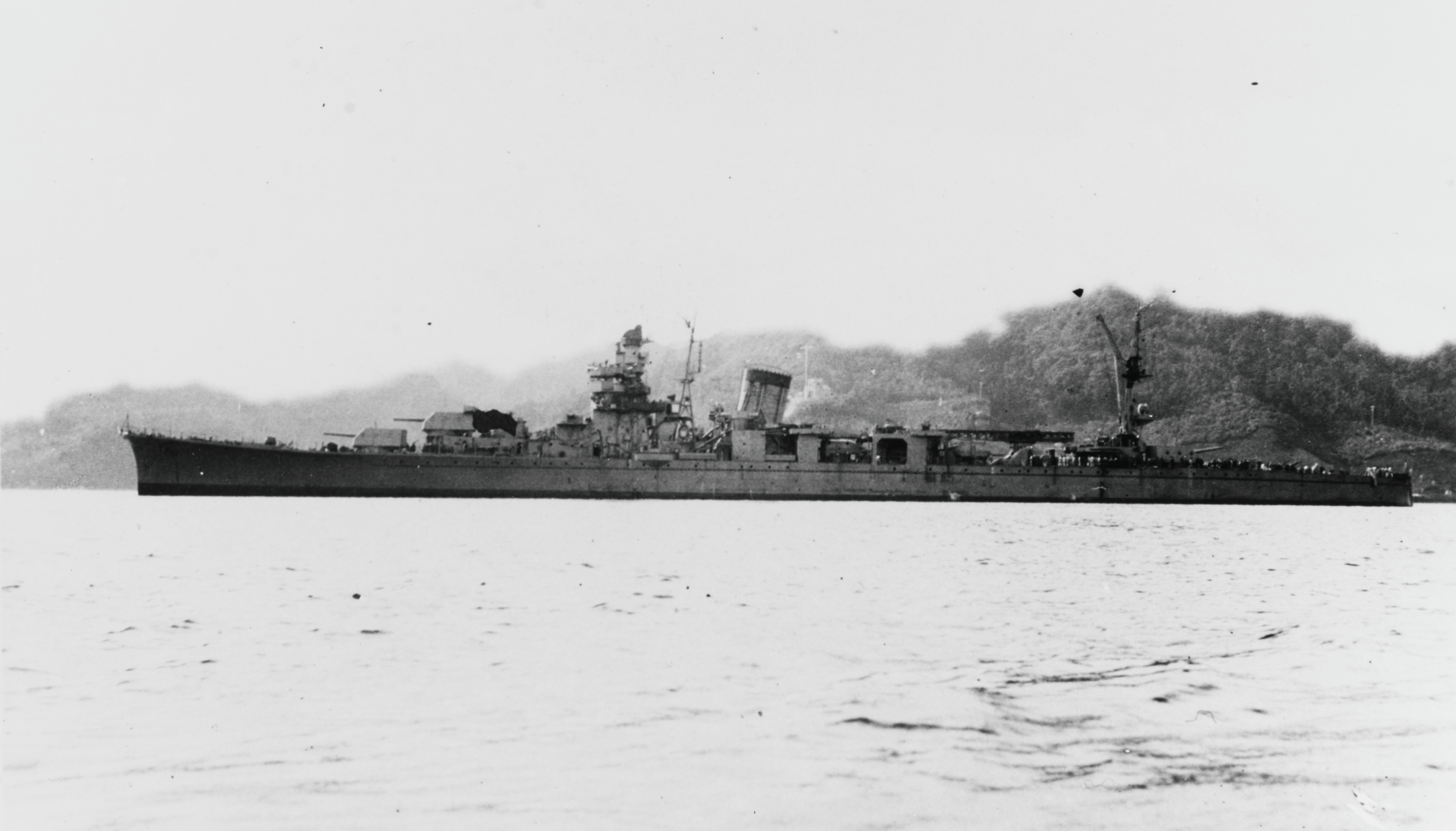
- Sakawa in November 1944 at Sasebo, shortly before commissioning

History

Empire of Japan
- Name: Sakawa
- Namesake: Sakawa River
- Ordered: 1939
- Builder: Sasebo Naval Arsenal
- Laid down: 21 November 1942
- Launched: 9 April 1944
- Completed: 30 November 1944
- Stricken: 5 October 1945
- Fate: Sunk as a target in Operation Crossroads, 2 July 1946

General characteristics (as built)
- Class & type: Agano-class light cruiser
- Displacement: 6,652 t (6,547 long tons) (standard); 8,534 t (8,399 long tons) (full load)
- Length: 174.1 m (571 ft 2 in) (o/a)
- Beam: 15.2 m (49 ft 10 in)
- Draft: 5.63 m (18 ft 6 in)
- Installed power: 6 water-tube boilers; 100,000 shp (75,000 kW)
- Propulsion: 4 shafts; 4 geared steam turbine sets
- Speed: 35 knots (65 km/h; 40 mph)
- Range: 6,300 nmi (11,700 km; 7,200 mi) at 18 knots (33 km/h; 21 mph)
- Complement: 805; 824 when serving as a flagship
- Sensors & processing systems: Type 93 Model 2 hydrophone; Type 3 Model 1 sonar; Type 13 early-warning radar; Type 21 early-warning radar; Type 22 surface-search radar
- Armament: 3 × twin 15 cm (6 in) guns; 2 × twin 8 cm (3 in) AA guns; 10 × triple, 18 × single 2.5 cm (1 in) AA guns; 2 × quadruple 61 cm (24 in) torpedo tubes; 2 × depth charge chutes, 18 depth charges; 3 × mines
- Armor: Belt 60 mm (2.4 in); Deck 20 mm (0.79 in)
- Aircraft carried: 2 × floatplanes
- Aviation facilities: 1 × aircraft catapult

Sakawa (酒匂) was the last of four Agano-class light cruisers built for the Imperial Japanese Navy (IJN) during World War II. Fuel shortages crippled the IJN's operations by the time the ship was completed in late 1944 and she never left Japanese waters. After the war, Sakawa was used to ferry Japanese troops home until she was selected in early 1946 to be expended for nuclear weapon tests during Operation Crossroads. The ship was used as a target during the first bomb test on 1 July and sank the following day.

== Design and description ==
The Agano-class ships were intended to replace the obsolete light cruisers built in the 1910s and 1920s as flagships of destroyer flotillas. The ships measured 174.1 meters (571 ft 2 in) long overall with a beam of 15.2 meters (49 ft 10 in) and had a draft of 5.63 meters (18 ft 6 in). They displaced 6,652 metric tons (6,547 long tons) at standard load and 8,534 metric tons (8,399 long tons) at deep load. Sakawa had a crew of 55 officers and 750 enlisted men; assignment as a flagship added 3 officers and 16 more sailors.

The Agano class had four geared steam turbine sets, each driving a single propeller shaft, using steam provided by six Kampon Ro Gō water-tube boilers. The turbines were designed to produce a total of 100,000 shaft horsepower (75,000 kW) and give the ships a speed of 35 knots (65 km/h; 40 mph). They carried enough fuel oil to give them a range of 6,300 nautical miles (11,700 km; 7,200 mi) at a speed of 18 knots (33 km/h; 21 mph).

=== Armament and sensors ===
The main armament of the Agano class consisted of six 15-centimeter (6 in) 41st Year Type guns in three twin-gun turrets, two in front of the superstructure and one aft. The secondary armament included four 8-centimeter (3 in) 98th Year Type anti-aircraft (AA) guns in two twin turrets amidships. Sakawa, being the last-built ship of her class, had the strongest suite of light anti-aircraft weapons which included 10 triple and 18 single mounts for 2.5-centimeter (1 in) Type 96 AA guns. The ships also had two quadruple torpedo launchers for 61-centimeter (24 in) Type 93 (Long Lance) torpedoes on the centerline and had a reload system with eight spare torpedoes. They were equipped for anti-submarine warfare with two depth charge chutes for 18 depth charges and could also carry three mines. The Agano-class ships were also fitted with a pair of Aichi E13A floatplanes and a catapult.

To detect submarines, the Aganos were equipped with a Type 93 Model 2 hydrophone installation and, unlike her sisters, Sakawa had a Type 3 Model 1 sonar, based on a German design. The ship was completed with Type 13 and Type 21 early-warning radars as well as a Type 22 surface-search radar. The latter system had received a modification that allowed it to be used for fire-control as well.

== Construction and career ==
Sakawa, named after the Sakawa River, was laid down on 21 November 1942 at Sasebo Naval Arsenal. The ship was launched on 9 April 1944 and completed on 30 November. On commissioning, she was assigned directly to the Combined Fleet. On 15 January 1945 Sakawa became flagship of Destroyer Squadron 11, training with new destroyers in the Inland Sea, and participating in a series of tests of a new anti-radar submarine coating. On 1 April, the squadron was assigned to Operation Ten-Go, the suicide mission against the American invasion forces at Okinawa. They were originally scheduled to accompany the battleship Yamato and her sister ship Yahagi, but there was no fuel available for the squadron to participate in the mission.

On 26 May one of Sakawa's propellers struck a rock in the Kanmon Straits between Kyushu and Honshu, but only had its tips partly bent. The ship was later transferred to the Maizuru Naval District and arrived there on 19 July. She was attacked by aircraft from the aircraft carrier USS Yorktown six days later, but was not damaged. When Japan surrendered on 2 September, Sakawa was docked at Maizuru.

=== Post-war operations ===
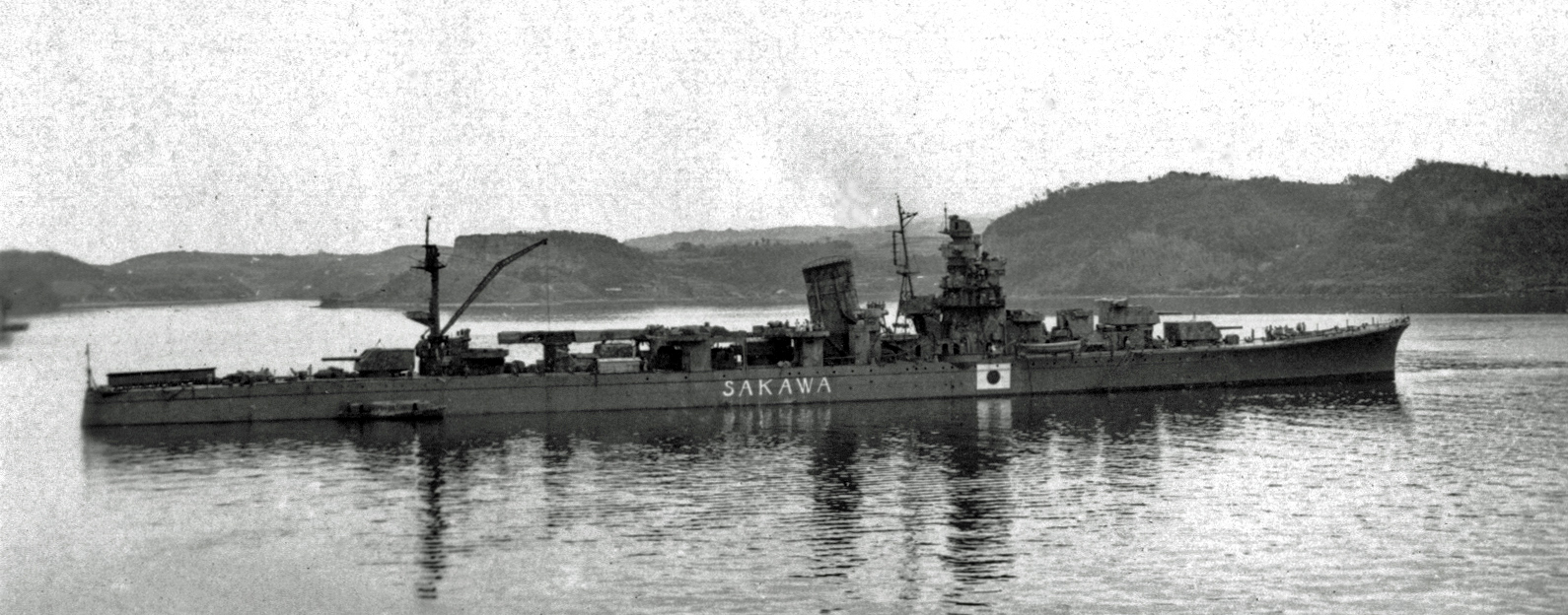
Sakawa in Sasebo, 15 October 1945

Shortly after the war, she was demilitarized, with her guns disabled, and her torpedoes, ammunition and other armament removed. On 5 October, the ship was struck from the navy list. Later that month Sakawa was used to evacuate 1,339 Imperial Japanese Army troops stranded on four small islands (Sonsorol, Fanna, Merir and Hatohobei) in the southern Palau group. She continued to work for the Repatriation Service as a transport until the end of February 1946, returning Japanese troops from New Guinea, Korea and from other locations.

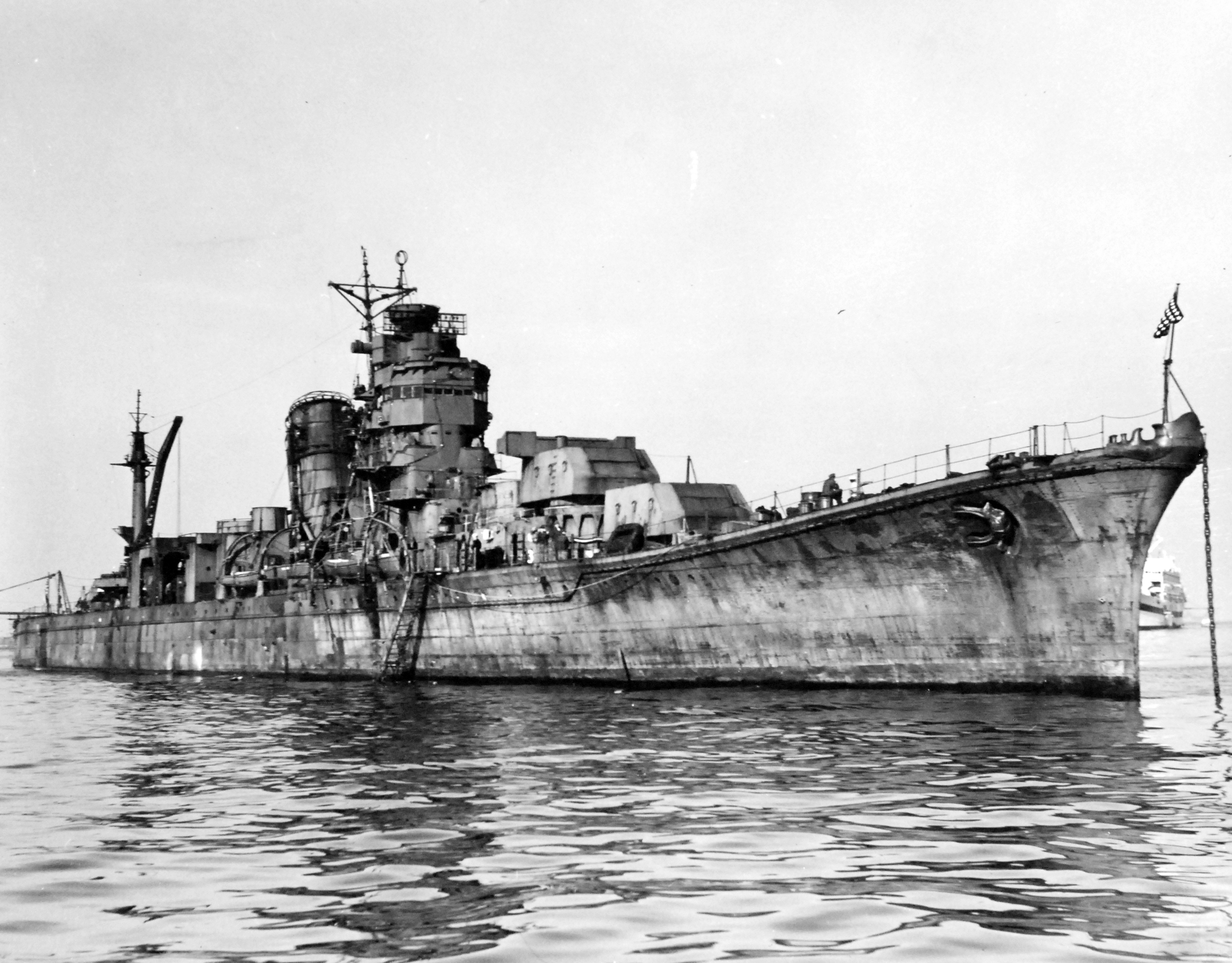
Sakawa awaiting atomic bomb testing, 1946

On 25 February 1946, Sakawa was sent to Yokosuka, where she was formally handed over to the United States Navy as a prize of war, for use (along with other surviving ships of the former Imperial Japanese Navy) in the upcoming Bikini atomic experiments. The salvage crew found her leaky hull infested with rats, and that most of the ship's systems were not functional. Together with the battleship Nagato, the ship departed Yokosuka for Eniwetok with a 165-man American crew on 18 March, with eleven of her former Japanese officers aboard to assist them. Ten days later, 300 nautical miles (560 km; 350 mi) from Eniwetok, Sakawa broke down and Nagato attempted to tow the cruiser, but had a boiler failure and then ran out of fuel. An oil tanker, SS Nickajack Trail, was diverted to refuel the ships, but ran aground on a reef in bad weather and was lost. The two ex-Japanese ships were finally taken in tow on 30 March, with Sakawa reaching Eniwetok two days later.

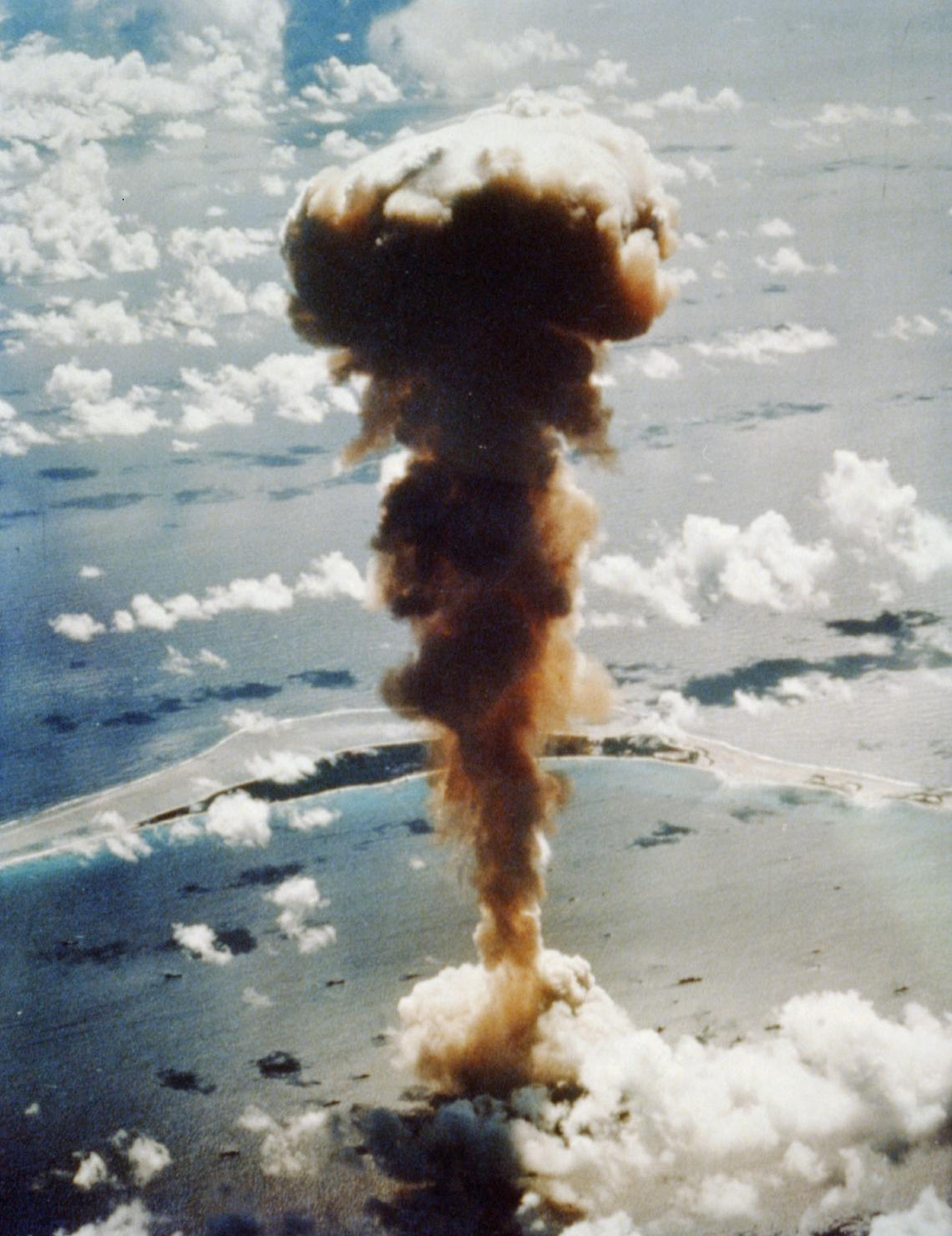
Aerial view of the Able mushroom cloud rising from the lagoon with the Bikini Island visible in the background

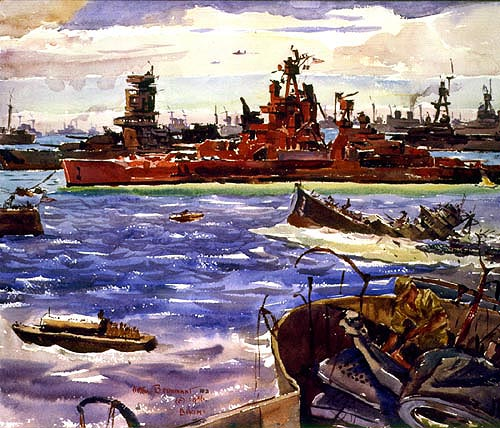
Painting of Sakawa (right) sinking after test Able

While at Eniwetok, five of the ship's American sailors were angry over the dismal working conditions aboard Sakawa and sabotaged her in an unsuccessful attempt to get off the ship. They damaged the fuel system, poured sand into the oil and water pumps, smashed gauges, tachometers, and cut high-pressure steam lines. Repairs took four days and the five sailors were brought up on charges. Sakawa sailed to Bikini Atoll the following month.

Operation Crossroads began with the first blast (Test Able), an air burst on 1 July; Sakawa was filled with cages containing various animals to be tested for radiation effects. Ground zero was 450 meters (490 yd) above and slightly to starboard of Sakawa's stern. The blast set the ship afire and its force crushed her superstructure aft of her bridge, damaged her hull and she began taking on water. After the test, Sakawa was slightly down by the stern and had a slight list to port. The flooding progressively worsened overnight and the following morning saw her even more settled by the stern and with a greater list. The tug boat USS Achomawi tried to beach the cruiser to prevent her from sinking, but failed as Sakawa started sinking by the stern almost as soon as towing began. Achomawi had to cut the tow cable to prevent herself from being dragged under. Sakawa sank at 11°37′N 165°29′E in about 200 feet (61 m) of water.

The second weapons test, Baker, was an underwater shot on 25 July about 500 feet (150 m) away from the sunken Sakawa. It blew most of the remaining forward superstructure off the ship and further damaged the wreck. Sakawa is mostly upright on the sandy bottom, but there is very little surviving aft of the forward gun turrets.

== Bibliography ==
- Hackett, Bob & Kingsepp, Sander. "IJN Sakawa: Tabular Record of Movement". CombinedFleet.com.
- Jentschura, Hansgeorg; Jung, Dieter & Mickel, Peter (1977). Warships of the Imperial Japanese Navy, 1869–1945. Annapolis, Maryland: United States Naval Institute. ISBN 0-87021-893-X.
- Lacroix, Eric & Wells II, Linton (1997). Japanese Cruisers of the Pacific War. Annapolis, Maryland: Naval Institute Press. ISBN 0-87021-311-3.
- Stille, Mark (2012). Imperial Japanese Navy Light Cruisers 1941-45. Botley, UK: Osprey. ISBN 978-1-84908-562-5.
- Tully, Anthony P. (28 November 2016). "Located/Surveyed Shipwrecks of the Imperial Japanese Navy". Imperial Japanese Navy Page. Combinedfleet.com.
- Whitley, M.J. (1995). Cruisers of World War Two: An International Encyclopedia. Annapolis, Maryland: Naval Institute Press. ISBN 1-55750-141-6.
