= Japanese cruiser Agano =

Agano-class cruiser

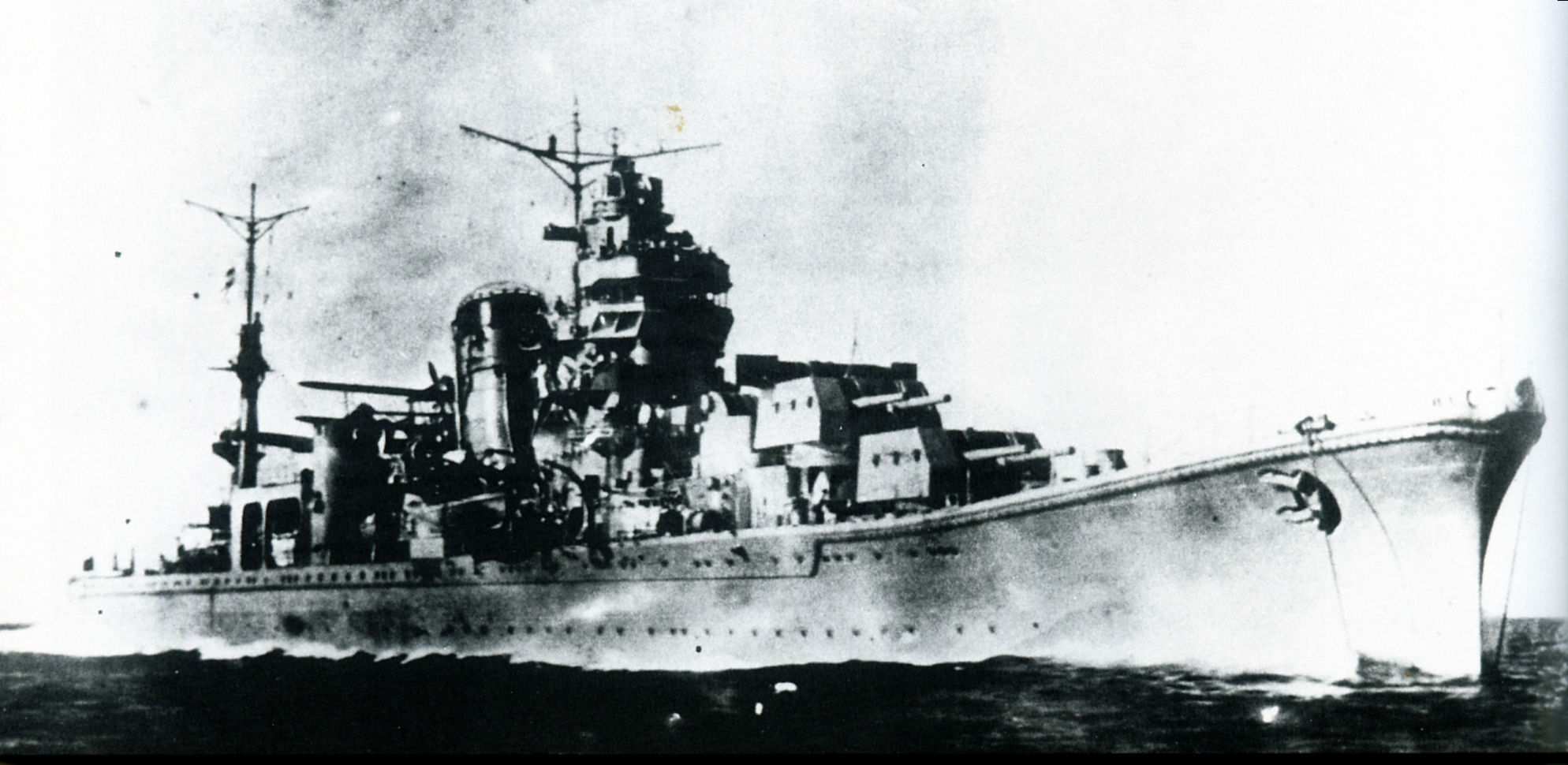
- Agano off Sasebo, October 1942

History

Empire of Japan
- Name: Agano
- Namesake: Agano River
- Ordered: 1939 Fiscal Year
- Builder: Sasebo Naval Arsenal
- Laid down: 18 June 1940
- Launched: 22 October 1941
- Commissioned: 31 October 1942
- Stricken: 31 March 1944
- Fate: Sunk, 15 February 1944

General characteristics (as built)
- Class & type: Agano-class light cruiser
- Displacement: 6,652 t (6,547 long tons) (standard); 8,534 t (8,399 long tons) (full load)
- Length: 174.1 m (571 ft 2 in) (o/a)
- Beam: 15.2 m (49 ft 10 in)
- Draft: 5.63 m (18 ft 6 in)
- Installed power: 6 water-tube boilers; 100,000 shp (75,000 kW)
- Propulsion: 4 shafts; 4 geared steam turbine sets
- Speed: 35 knots (65 km/h; 40 mph)
- Range: 6,300 nmi (11,700 km; 7,200 mi) at 18 knots (33 km/h; 21 mph)
- Complement: 51 officers, 649 sailors; 57 and 669 when serving as a flagship
- Sensors & processing systems: Type 93 Model 2 hydrophone; Type 93 Model 3 sonar
- Armament: 3 × twin 15 cm (6 in) guns; 2 × twin 8 cm (3 in) AA guns; 2 × triple 2.5 cm (1 in) AA guns; 2 × twin 13.2 mm (0.5 in) AA MGs; 2 × quadruple 61 cm (24 in) torpedo tubes; 2 × depth charge chutes, 18 depth charges; 3 × mines
- Armor: Belt 60 mm (2.4 in); Deck 20 mm (0.8 in)
- Aircraft carried: 2 × floatplanes
- Aviation facilities: 1 × aircraft catapult

Agano (阿賀野) was the lead ship of her class of four light cruisers built for the Imperial Japanese Navy (IJN) during World War II. Completed in 1942, she escorted a troop convoy to New Guinea in December. In early 1943 the ship participated in Operation Ke, the evacuation of Japanese troops from Guadalcanal. Six months later Agano transported troops and supplies to New Guinea and she played a role in the Battle of Empress Augusta Bay in early November where she damaged the destroyer USS Spence. A few weeks later, the ship was badly damaged by American airstrikes and she sailed for Truk under her own power the following day. While en route, Agano was torpedoed by an American submarine and had to be towed to her destination. After several months of repairs, she left for Japan, but was intercepted and sunk by another American submarine in February 1944. Most of her crew was rescued by her escorting destroyer, but that ship was sunk with the loss of most of her crew and all of Agano's survivors by an American airstrike the following day.

== Design and description ==
The Agano-class ships were intended to replace the obsolete light cruisers built in the 1910s and 1920s as flagships of destroyer flotillas. The ships measured 174.1 meters (571 ft 2 in) long overall with a beam of 15.2 meters (49 ft 10 in) and had a draft of 5.63 meters (18 ft 6 in). They displaced 6,652 metric tons (6,547 long tons) at standard load and 8,534 metric tons (8,399 long tons) at deep load. The ships had a crew of 51 officers and 649 enlisted men; assignment as a flagship added 6 officers and 20 more sailors.

The Agano class had four geared steam turbine sets, each driving a single propeller shaft, using steam provided by six Kampon Ro Gō water-tube boilers. The turbines were designed to produce a total of 100,000 shaft horsepower (75,000 kW) and give the ships a speed of 35 knots (65 km/h; 40 mph). The ships carried enough fuel oil to give them a range of 6,300 nautical miles (11,700 km; 7,200 mi) at a speed of 18 knots (33 km/h; 21 mph).

=== Armament and protection ===
The main armament of the Agano class consisted of six 41st Year Type 15-centimeter (6 in) guns in three twin-gun turrets, two superfiring in front of the superstructure and one aft. The secondary armament included four Type 98 8 cm (3 in) anti-aircraft (AA) guns in two twin-gun mounts amidships. The suite of light anti-aircraft weapons included a pair of triple mounts for Type 96 2.5-centimeter (1 in) AA guns and two twin-gun mounts for Type 93 13.2 mm (0.5 in) anti-aircraft machineguns. The ships also had two rotating quadruple torpedo launchers on the upper deck for Type 93 61-centimeter (24 in) (Long Lance) torpedoes on the centerline and had a reload system with eight spare torpedoes. The Agano-class ships were also fitted with a pair of Aichi E13A floatplanes and a catapult. To detect submarines, the Aganos were equipped with a Type 93 Model 2 hydrophone installation and a Type 93 Model 3 sonar. They were equipped with two depth charge chutes for 18 depth charges and could also carry three mines.

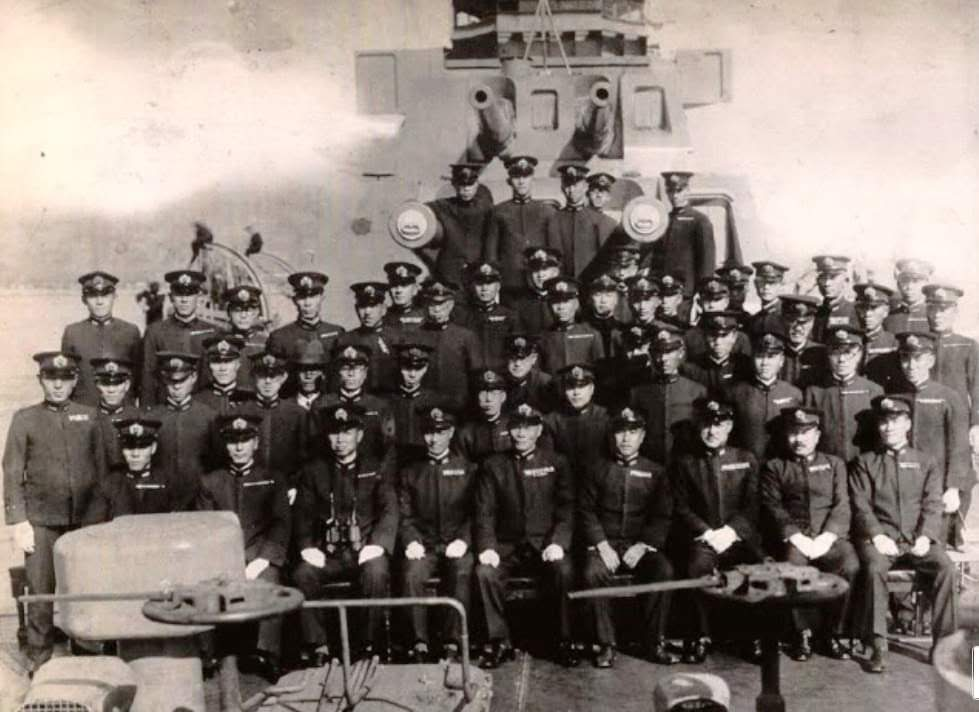
Agano's crew posed on the bow during her commissioning, 30 October 1942

The propulsion machinery was protected by a waterline armor belt 60 millimeters (2.4 in) thick with 20-millimeter (0.8 in) transverse bulkheads fore and aft of the propulsion machinery and a middle deck of the same thickness. The ships' magazines were enclosed in armored boxes with 55-millimeter (2.2 in) sides, 20-millimeter tops and 20- or 25-millimeter ends.

== Construction and career ==
Agano, named for the Agano River, was laid down at Sasebo Naval Arsenal on 18 June 1940, launched on 22 October 1941 and completed on 31 October 1942. She was assigned as flagship of Destroyer Squadron 10 (Sentai 10) of the Third Fleet on 20 November after working up. The ship departed Kure six days later and arrived at Truk in the Caroline Islands on 1 December where Rear Admiral Susumu Kimura hoisted his flag aboard her the following day. On 16 December Agano escorted the aircraft carrier Jun'yō and a troop convoy to Wewak and Madang in New Guinea. The ships briefly covered the landing of Japanese forces at Hollandia before returning to Truk on 20 December.

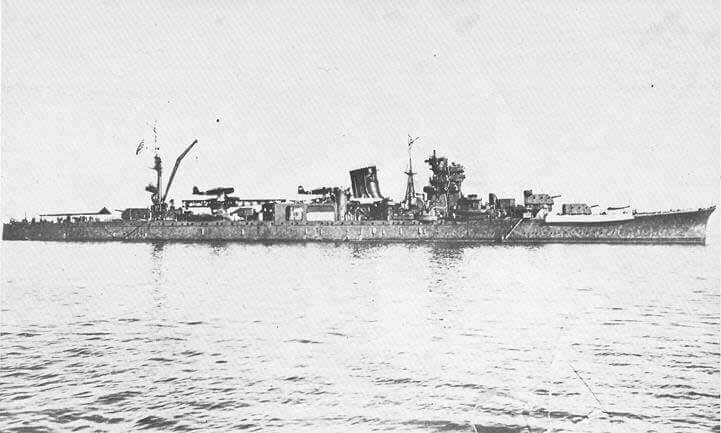
Agano anchored off Truk naval base, January 1943

Agano escorted the forces covering the evacuation of Japanese troops from Guadalcanal Island (Operation KE) from 31 January to 9 February 1943, during which 11,700 Japanese soldiers were removed. The ship was transferred to the 1st Mobile Fleet the following day. She returned to Kure Naval District in early May for her sea trials and was then assigned to the Combined Fleet preparing to counterattack the American offensive in the Aleutian Islands, but this operation was cancelled after the Allied victory on Attu on 29 May. Agano was refitted at the Kure Naval Arsenal from 3 June to 2 July. The ship exchanged her 13.2 mm machine guns for a pair of twin-gun Type 96 mounts and another pair of triple 25 mm mounts were added amidships, giving her a total of sixteen 25 mm guns. A Type 21 early-warning radar was also installed.

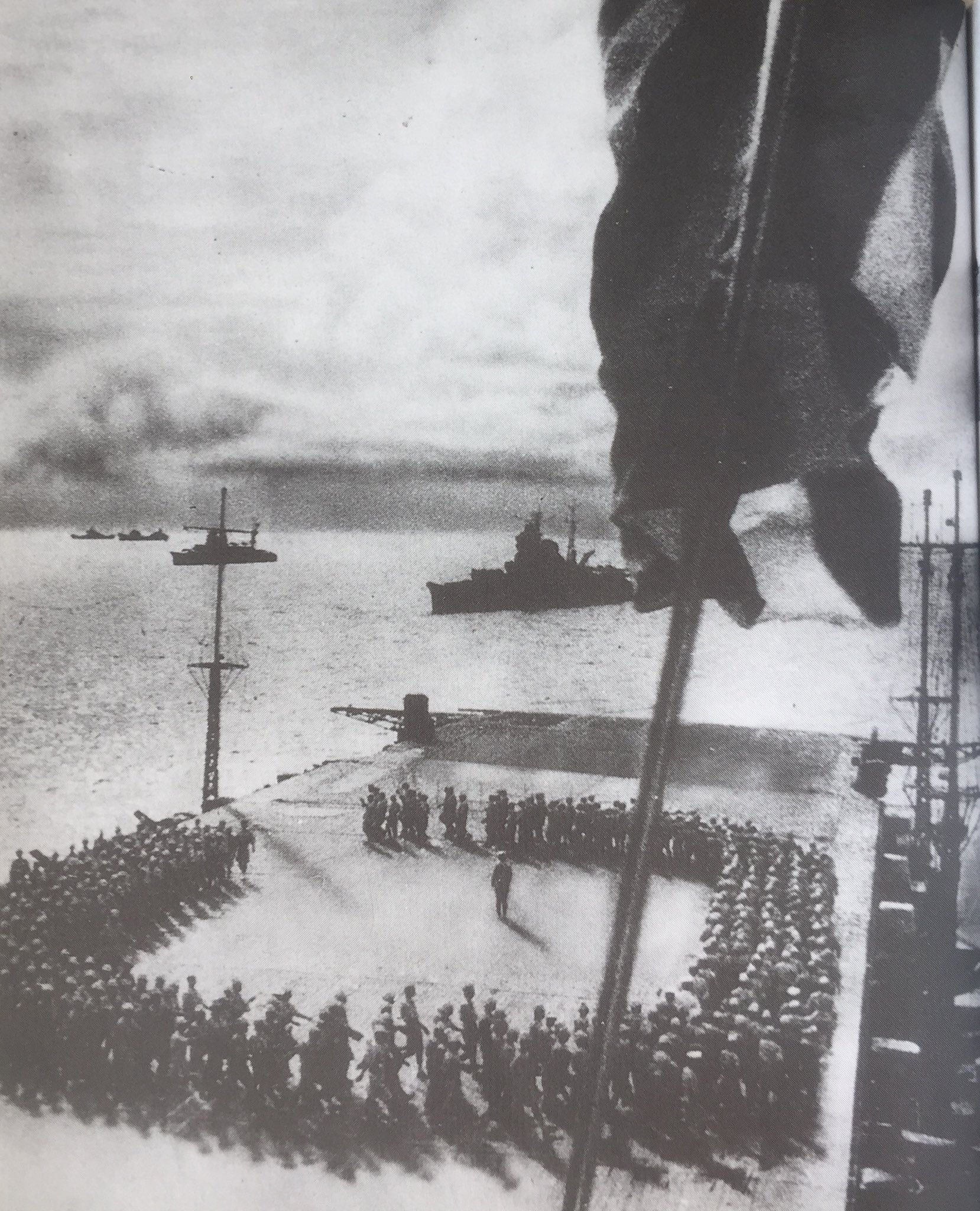
Agano anchored behind the heavy cruiser Tone and aircraft carrier Zuikaku during Operation Ke, February 1943

Agano departed for Truk on 9 July escorting the First Carrier Division while carrying troops and supplies. Despite numerous sightings by American submarines and an attack on the aircraft carrier Zuihō, the convoy made it safely to Truk on the 15th. Agano helped to ferry troops and supplies to Rabaul on 19–26 July. In response to the American carrier raid on Tarawa on 18 September, the ship and much of the fleet sortied for Eniwetok to search for the American forces before they returned to Truk on 23 September, having failed to locate them. The Japanese had intercepted some American radio traffic that suggested another attack on Wake Island, and on 17 October, Agano and the bulk of the fleet sailed for Eniwetok to be in a position to intercept any such attack, but no attack occurred and the fleet returned to Truk.

=== Battle of Empress Augusta Bay ===
The ship, now the flagship of Rear Admiral Morikazu Osugi, departed Truk on 30 October for Rabaul just as the Americans were preparing to invade Bougainville Island on 1 November. The Japanese attempted to disrupt the landings on the night of 1/2 November with a force of two heavy cruisers, two light cruisers, including Agano, and six destroyers under the command of Rear Admiral Sentarō Ōmori. The Japanese ships had been spotted by American aircraft around 21:00 and Task Force 39, which consisted of four light cruisers and eight destroyers, was ordered to intercept them.

Omori arranged his ships in three staggered columns; the outer ones were each led by one of the light cruisers followed by three destroyers and the two heavy cruisers were in the middle. Osugi in Agano led the southernmost column, which trailed the main body. One of the cruiser floatplanes claimed to have spotted a cruiser and three destroyers 20 nmi (37 km; 23 mi) south at 01:20 and Ōmori ordered his ships to make a 180-degree maneuver intended to buy time for the pilot to investigate Empress Augusta Bay for American shipping. Less than an hour later, he reported that American transports crowded the bay; the pilot had actually spotted three minelayers and their destroyer escort that were leaving the bay. Omori ordered his ships to reverse course at 02:25. In the darkness, and with most ships lacking radar, the Japanese formation of three columns was disordered by the maneuvers and commanders lost track of where their ships were in relation to each other.

American radar picked up the Japanese at a range of 36,000 yards (33,000 m) at 02:27 and Rear Admiral Aaron Merrill, commander of the task force, ordered his destroyers to attack with their torpedoes while his cruisers stood off to avoid Japanese torpedoes and would open fire when the torpedoes struck their targets to maintain the element of surprise. The leading division of four destroyers fired a salvo of 25 torpedoes by 02:46, but they were detected as they turned away and the Japanese turned into the torpedoes to makes themselves smaller targets. Their maneuvering caused Merrill to believe that his ships had been spotted and the first of his cruisers opened fire at the light cruiser Sendai, leading the northernmost column, three minutes later.

The abrupt maneuvers by the Japanese ships, both to evade the American torpedoes and to fire their own, led to one collision and several near misses early in the battle. Most of the American cruisers were firing at the heavy cruisers in the center column by 03:05 and Omori turned away in a 270-degree turn that cut across the path of Agano's column. The heavy cruiser Myōkō rammed and crippled the destroyer Hatsukaze while the heavy cruiser Haguro nearly struck the destroyer Wakatsuki. Incorrectly believing that he had sunk three of the American cruisers, Omori ordered his ships to cease fire at 03:29 and turned away to disengage four minutes later. Osugi, who had kept his ships on the disengaged side of the heavy cruisers after the collision, fired a parting shot of eight torpedoes at 03:40, all of which missed.

After returning to Rabaul, Agano was near-missed by a bomb when the aircraft carriers USS Saratoga and USS Princeton attacked the port on 5 November. The bomb damaged one anti-aircraft gun and killed one crewman. Agano and her sister Noshiro put to sea on the following day to destroy the American forces near Empress Augusta Bay, but this was cancelled and the ships returned to Rabaul on 7 November. Four days later, the American aircraft carriers of Task Group 50.2 attacked Rabaul. Agano was hit by a Mark 13 torpedo which blew off the very end of her stern and bent her rearmost propeller shafts. The ship's rudder was not damaged, although Osugi was injured in the attack. After emergency repairs were made by the ship's crew, Agano departed Rabaul under her own power the next day, escorted by the destroyer Urakaze. Not long after their departure, the ships were sighted by the American submarine USS Scamp, which launched six torpedoes. One of them struck the cruiser amidships, flooding all of the boiler rooms, which knocked out all power. While attempting to repair the damage, the submarine Albacore attempted to attack, but was prevented from doing so by depth charges from Urakaze. Noshiro and the light cruiser Nagara were ordered to her assistance on the 13th and her sister took Agano in tow upon her arrival. The tow parted the following day and Nagara took over the task. The damaged ship finally reached Truk on 16 November.

=== Sinking ===
Temporary repairs by the repair ship Akashi began immediately upon her arrival and lasted until 15 February 1944. That evening she departed Truk to get permanent repairs in the Japanese home islands, escorted by the destroyer Oite and submarine chaser CH-28. On the afternoon of 16 February, about 160 nautical miles (300 km) north of Truk, Agano was attacked by the submarine Skate, which fired four torpedoes. Two struck the cruiser on the starboard side at 16:44, flooding Boiler Room No. 2 which gave her a list of 12° and started a large fire. The ship progressively flooded and Oite rescued 523 survivors between 20:00 and 23:30. Agano sank at 10°11′N 151°42′E at 01:50 on 17 February and was struck from the navy list on 31 March.

As Oite was approaching Truk the following morning, the destroyer was sunk by Grumman TBF Avengers of Task Force 58 in the course of Operation Hailstone, and sank within minutes, taking all but twenty of her own crew down with her. All of the Agano crewmembers originally rescued were lost.
