= Japanese cruiser Noshiro =

Agano-class cruiser

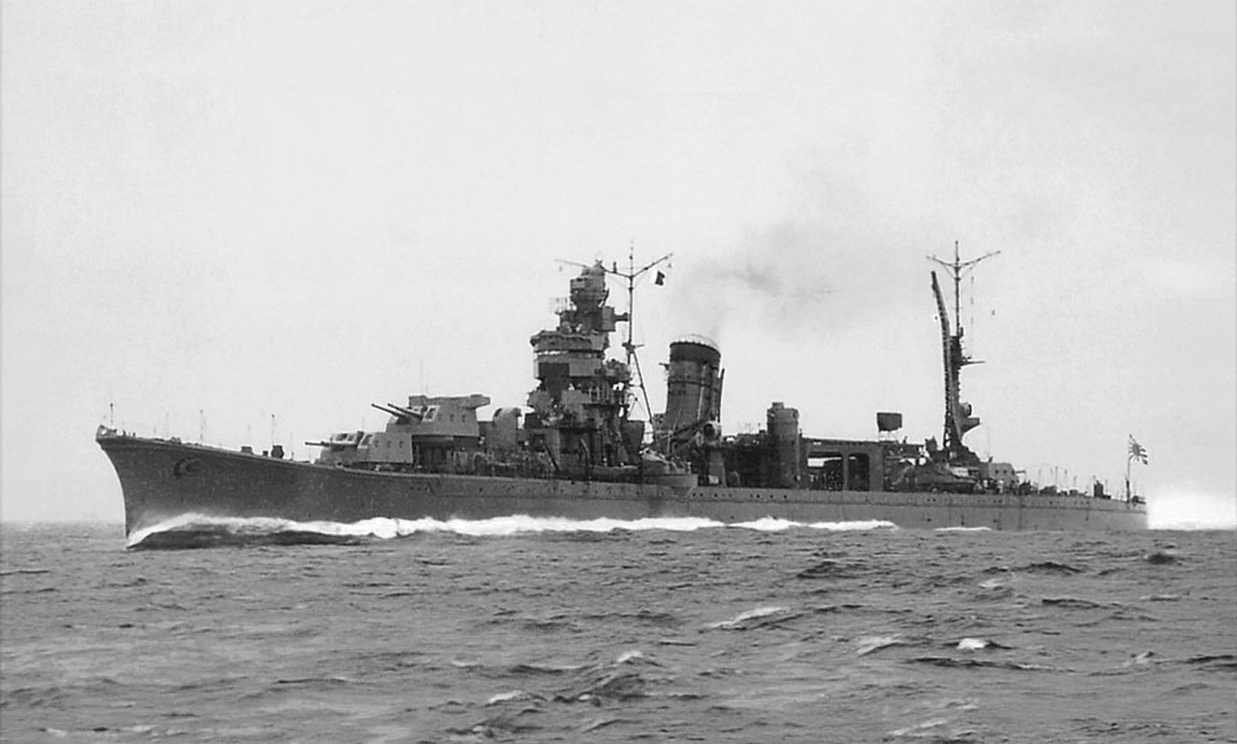
- Noshiro in Tokyo Bay, July 1943

History

Empire of Japan
- Name: Noshiro
- Ordered: 1939 Fiscal Year
- Builder: Yokosuka Naval Arsenal
- Laid down: 4 September 1941
- Launched: 19 July 1942
- Commissioned: 30 June 1943
- Stricken: 20 December 1944
- Fate: Sunk 26 October 1944 by USN aircraft south of Mindoro Sulu Sea; 11°42′N 121°41′E

General characteristics
- Class & type: Agano-class cruiser
- Displacement: 6,652 t (6,547 long tons) (standard); 7,590 t (7,470 long tons) (loaded)
- Length: 162 m (531 ft)
- Beam: 15.2 m (50 ft)
- Draught: 5.6 m (18 ft)
- Propulsion: 4 shaft Gihon geared turbines; 6 Kampon boilers; 100,000 shp (75,000 kW)
- Speed: 35 knots (65 km/h)
- Range: 6,300 nautical miles (11,670 km) at 18 knots (33 km/h)
- Complement: 726
- Armament: 6 × 152 mm Type 41 guns (3×2); 4 × 76 mm Type 98 DP guns (2x2), 2 × triple Type 96 25 mm AA guns, 2 × twin 13 mm machine guns; 8 × 610 mm torpedo tubes (2x4); 48 naval mines
- Armor: Belt 60 mm (2.4 in); Deck 20 mm (0.79 in)
- Aircraft carried: 2 x floatplanes
- Aviation facilities: 1 aircraft catapult

Noshiro (能代) was an Agano-class cruiser which served with the Imperial Japanese Navy (IJN) during World War II. She was named after the Noshiro River in Akita Prefecture in northern Japan.

== Background ==
Noshiro was the second of the four vessels completed in the Agano class of light cruisers, which were intended to replace increasingly obsolete light cruisers in the Imperial Japanese Navy. Funding was authorized in the 4th Naval Armaments Supplement Programme of 1939, although construction was delayed due to lack of capacity in Japanese shipyards. Like other vessels of her class, Noshiro was intended for use as the flagship of a destroyer flotilla.

== Design ==
The design for the Agano class was based on technologies developed by the experimental cruiser Yūbari, resulting in a graceful and uncluttered deck line and single smokestack.

Noshiro was armed with six 152 mm Type 41 guns in three gun turrets. Secondary armament included four 76 mm Type 98 DP guns designed specifically for the class, in two twin turrets amidships. Anti-aircraft weapons included two triple 25 mm AA guns in front of the bridge, and two twin 13 mm mounts near the mast. Noshiro also had two quadruple torpedo launchers for Type 93 torpedoes located below the flight deck, with eight reserve torpedoes. The torpedo tubes were mounted on the centerline, as was more common with destroyers, and had a rapid reload system with eight spare torpedoes. Being mounted on the centerline allowed the twin launchers to fire to either port or starboard, meaning that a full eight-torpedo broadside could be fired, whereas a ship with separate port and starboard launchers can only fire half of its torpedoes at a time. Two depth charge rails and 18 depth charges were also installed aft. Noshiro was also equipped with two Aichi E13A aircraft and had a flight deck with a 26-foot catapult.

The engines were a quadruple-shaft geared turbine arrangement with six boilers in five boiler rooms, developing 100,000 shp (75,000 kW) for a maximum speed of 35 knots (65 km/h).

== Service career ==
=== Early career ===
Noshiro was launched at Yokosuka Naval Arsenal on 19 July 1942 and completed less than a year later on 30 June 1943. On completion, she was initially assigned to the IJN 1st Fleet for training off of Hashirajima. On 15 August 1943, she was reassigned to Vice Admiral Takeo Kurita's Second Fleet as the flagship of DesRon 2, replacing the cruiser Jintsū, which had been sunk a month earlier at the Battle of Kolombangara

=== Battles in the Gilbert Islands and Solomon Islands ===
On 18 September 1943, in reaction to air raids on Tarawa launched by United States Navy aircraft carriers USS Lexington, Princeton and Belleau Wood, the Combined Fleet sortied to Eniwetok with a massive force but failed to make contact and returned to Truk in the Caroline Islands. Likewise, from 17 October 1943 – 26 October 1943, the Combined Fleet failed to contact US Task Force 15 after it bombed Wake Island.

On 1 November 1943, the United States launched the Bougainville Campaign to retake Bougainville in the Solomon Islands. The day after the Battle of Empress Augusta Bay (2 November), Noshiro departed Truk with Sentai 4's Atago, Takao and Maya, Sentai 7's Suzuya and Mogami, Sentai 8's Chikuma and four destroyers, arriving at Rabaul on 5 November 1943. While refueling in Simpson Harbor from the oiler Kokuyo Maru the cruisers were attacked during the Carrier Raid on Rabaul by 97 planes from Task Force 38's carriers USS Saratoga and Princeton. Noshiro was hit by a dud Mark 13 aerial torpedo.

From 12 November 1943, Noshiro assisted its sister ship, Agano, after the latter was torpedoed by the submarine USS Scamp, and attempted to tow it back to Truk.

On 20 November 1943, American "Operation Galvanic" to retake the Gilbert Islands invaded Tarawa. The invasion fleet of 200 ships included 13 battleships and 11 carriers. Noshiro responded by sailing from Truk with Suzuya, Kumano, Chōkai, Ōyodo and several destroyers. The group was attacked on 1 January 1944 by aircraft from the aircraft carriers USS Bunker Hill and Monterey. One of Noshiro's gun turrets was put out of action temporarily by the attack and ten crewmen killed.

On 19 January 1944, Noshiro was dispatched from Truk to assist the aircraft carrier Un'yō after it had been torpedoed by the submarine USS Haddock by towing it back to Saipan. Noshiro continued on to Yokosuka Naval Arsenal, going into dry dock for repairs and refit on 1 February 1944. Six triple-mount and eight single-mount Type 96 25 mm AA guns were fitted. This brought the Noshiro's 25 mm total to 32 barrels (8x3) (8x1).

=== Battles in the Philippines ===
The retrofit was completed by 28 March 1944, enabling Noshiro to depart for Davao and Lingga on 5 April 1944 with Sentai 4's Atago, Takao and Chōkai, ‘‘Sentai’’ 5's Myōkō and Haguro and the destroyer Harusame. The cruiser group was attacked by the submarine USS Dace, which missed with all six bow torpedoes, and was also sighted by the submarine USS Darter, which failed to achieve an attack vector. Likewise, the cruiser group was sighted coming out of Davao Bay on 7 April 1944 by the submarine USS Scamp, which was also unable to attack, and by the submarine USS Gurnard on 18 May 1944 which fired a full salvo of six bow torpedoes, all of which missed.

Noshiro was at the Battle of the Philippine Sea on 19 June 1944, where it was flagship of Rear Admiral Mikio Hayakawa as part of Vice Admiral Kurita’s Vanguard Force. Noshiro escaped from the battle undamaged.

From late June-early July 1944, Noshiro again was dry docked and refitted at Kure Naval Arsenal. Two more triple-mount Type 96 25 mm AA gun mounts were installed amidships bringing the total number of 25 mm guns to 48 barrels (10x3, 18x1). A Type 13 air-search and Type 22 surface-search radar were also fitted. On 8 July 1944, Noshiro departed Kure with the destroyers carrying army troops and material to Singapore, and remained in the vicinity for the following three months conducting training.

On 18 October 1944, Noshiro was ordered to Brunei, in preparation for the Battle of Leyte Gulf, which began on 22 October 1944. Noshiro, as DesRon 2's flagship, sortied with Admiral Kurita's First Mobile Striking Force, Force "A" (Center Force). At the Battle of the Sibuyan Sea on 24 October 1944, Force A was attacked 11 times by over 250 carrier aircraft from Task Force 38 comprising the aircraft carriers USS Essex, Lexington, Intrepid, Cabot, Franklin and Enterprise. Although the battleships Yamato, Nagato, Haruna, and the cruisers Myōkō and Tone were damaged, Noshiro escaped unharmed.

The following day, at the Battle off Samar, Noshiro hit the escort carrier USS White Plains with several 6-inch shells, but was in turn hit starboard side by a 5-inch shell from an American destroyer. She also participated in the sinking of the carrier USS Gambier Bay, which was one of two cases of an aircraft carrier being sunk solely by naval gunfire.

On 26 October 1944, west of Panay, Kurita's force was attacked by 80 Grumman TBM-1C Avenger torpedo bombers from the aircraft carriers USS Wasp and Cowpens. One bomb exploded in Noshiro's AA shell magazine, starting a fire that was quickly extinguished. In the second attack, six more Avengers attacked Noshiro, which dodged their torpedoes, but in the third wave, an Avenger launched a Mark 13 aerial torpedo that hit in the No. 3 boiler room. It instantly flooded, and the No. 1 boiler room flooded shortly thereafter. The inrush of water threw all of Noshiro's boilers off line, and she came to a halt with a 16-degree list to port.

While emergency repairs were carried out and Noshiro dead in the water, the destroyer Hamanami came alongside and removed Rear Admiral Hayakawa, who later transferred to Yamato. At 1014, a fourth attack of 28 TBMs and Curtiss SB2C-3 Helldiver dive bombers from USS Hornet struck with another torpedo to starboard beneath Noshiro's No. 2 turret. Noshiro's gunners later claimed to have shot down six of the attacking planes. Captain Kajiwara ordered the forward magazines flooded in an attempt to right the ship. Five minutes later, with the forward deck awash and the list steadily increasing, Kajiwara gave the order to abandon ship. At 1113, Noshiro sank at 11°42′N 121°41′E south of Mindoro. The destroyers Akishimo and Hamanami rescued Captain Sueyoshi Kajiwara and 328 survivors.

Noshiro was removed from the navy list on 20 December 1944.

== Sources ==
- Brown, David (1990). Warship Losses of World War Two. Naval Institute Press. ISBN 1-55750-914-X.
- Dull, Paul S. (1978). A Battle History of the Imperial Japanese Navy, 1941-1945. Annapolis, Maryland: Naval Institute Press. ISBN 0-87021-097-1.
- Jentschura, Hansgeorg; Jung, Dieter & Mickel, Peter (1977). Warships of the Imperial Japanese Navy, 1869–1945. Annapolis, Maryland: United States Naval Institute. ISBN 0-87021-893-X.
- Lacroix, Eric & Wells II, Linton (1997). Japanese Cruisers of the Pacific War. Annapolis, Maryland: Naval Institute Press. ISBN 0-87021-311-3.
- Roscoe, Theodore (1949). United States Submarine Operations in World War II. Annapolis, Maryland: Naval Institute Press. ISBN 0-87021-731-3.
- Stille, Mark (2012). Imperial Japanese Navy Light Cruisers 1941-45. Osprey. ISBN 978-1-84908-562-5.
- Whitley, M.J. (1995). Cruisers of World War Two: An International Encyclopedia. Annapolis, Maryland: Naval Institute Press. ISBN 1-55750-141-6.
