= Japanese cruiser Yahagi (1942) =

Agano-class cruiser

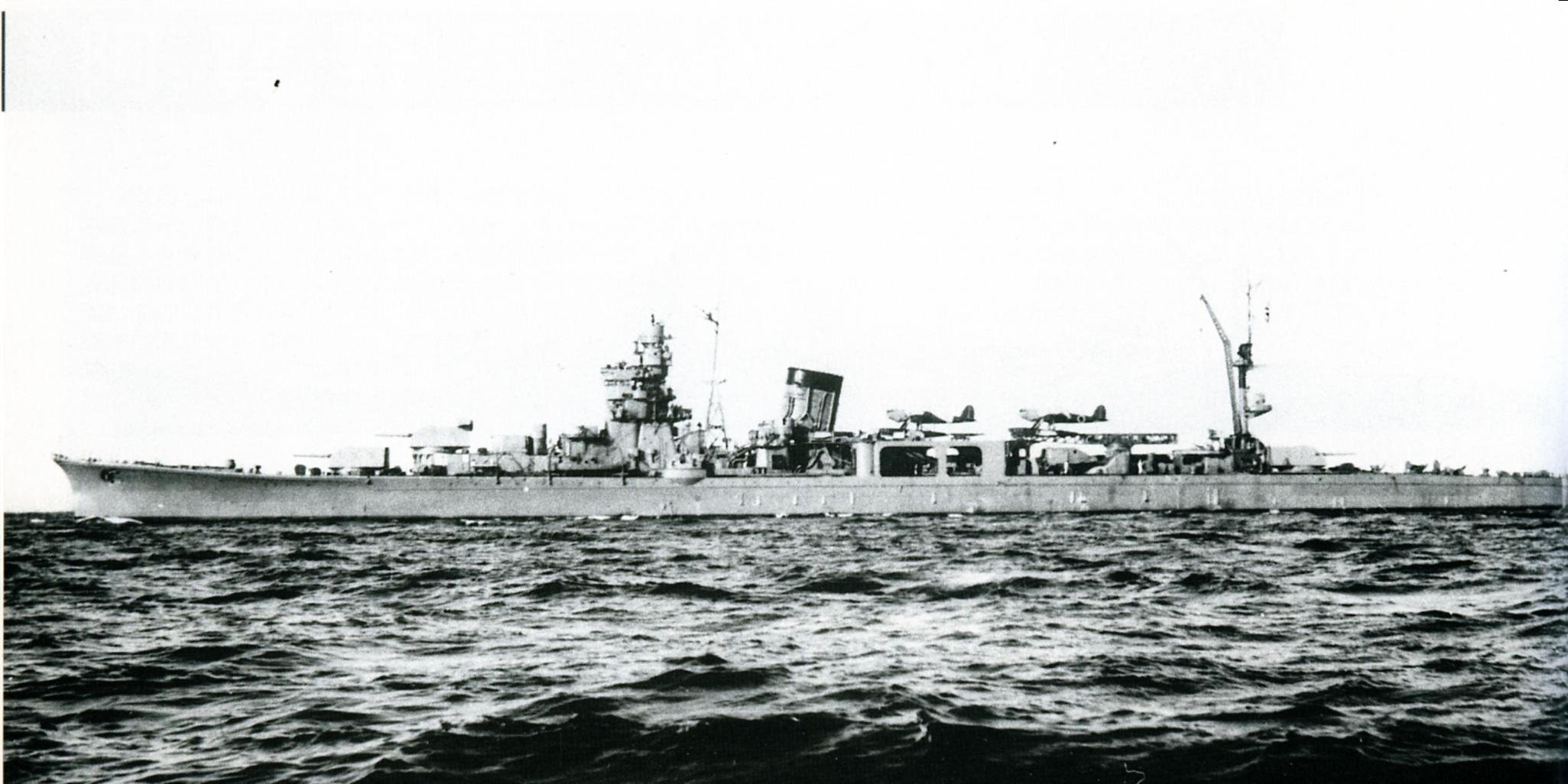
- Yahagi off of Sasebo, Nagasaki in December 1943

History

Empire of Japan
- Name: Yahagi
- Namesake: Yahagi River
- Ordered: 1939 Fiscal Year
- Builder: Sasebo Naval Arsenal
- Laid down: 11 November 1941
- Launched: 25 October 1942
- Commissioned: 29 December 1943
- Stricken: 20 June 1945
- Fate: Sunk 7 April 1945 by USN aircraft south of Kyūshū; 30°47′N 128°08′E

General characteristics
- Class & type: Agano-class cruiser
- Displacement: 6,652 t (6,547 long tons) (standard); 7,590 t (7,470 long tons) (loaded)
- Length: 174.5 m (573 ft)
- Beam: 15.2 m (50 ft)
- Draught: 5.63 m (18.5 ft)
- Propulsion: 4 shaft Gihon geared turbines; 6 Kampon boilers; 100,000 shp
- Speed: 35 knots (65 km/h)
- Range: 6,300 nautical miles (11,670 km) at 18 knots (33 km/h)
- Complement: 736
- Armament: 6 x 152 mm Type 41 guns (3 x 2); 4 × 8cm/60 Type 98 naval guns (2x2), 2 × triple Type 96 25 mm AA guns, 2 × twin 13 mm machine guns; 8 × 610 mm torpedo tubes (4x2); 48 naval mines
- Armor: Belt 60 mm (2.4 in); Deck 20 mm (0.79 in)
- Aircraft carried: 2 x floatplanes
- Aviation facilities: 1 aircraft catapult

Yahagi (矢矧) was an Agano-class cruiser which served with the Imperial Japanese Navy (IJN) during World War II. Yahagi served a short but notable career, escorting aircraft carriers at the battle of the Philippine Sea in June 1944, before serving in the battle of Leyte Gulf later that October where she helped to sink the destroyer USS Johnston.

In April 1945, Yahagi served as the largest escort to the Yamato - the largest and most powerful battleship ever constructed - during her doomed final mission. Ultimately, the formation was attacked by nearly 400 American carrier aircraft, and Yahagi was sunk to 12 bombs and 7 torpedoes, joining Yamato and four destroyers. Captain Tameichi Hara survived Yahagi's sinking and detailed her final mission in his autobiography "Japanese Destroyer Captain".

== Background ==
Yahagi was the third of four vessels completed in the Agano class of light cruisers, which were intended to replace increasingly obsolete light cruisers in the Imperial Japanese Navy. Funding was authorized in the 4th Naval Armaments Supplement Programme of 1939, although construction was delayed due to lack of capacity in Japanese shipyards. Like other vessels of her class, Yahagi was intended for use as the flagship of a destroyer flotilla.

== Design ==
The design for the Agano class was based on technologies developed by the experimental cruiser Yūbari, resulting in a graceful and uncluttered deck line and single smokestack.

Yahagi was armed with six 152 mm Type 41 guns in three gun turrets. Secondary armament included four 8cm/60 Type 98 naval guns designed specifically for the class, in two twin turrets amidships. Anti-aircraft weapons included two triple 25 mm AA guns in front of the bridge, and two twin 13 mm mounts near the mast. Yahagi also had two quadruple torpedo launchers for Type 93 torpedoes located below the flight deck, with eight reserve torpedoes. The torpedo tubes were mounted on the centerline, as was more common with destroyers, and had a rapid reload system. Being mounted on the centerline allowed the twin launchers to fire to either port or starboard, meaning that a full eight-torpedo broadside could be fired, whereas a ship with separate port and starboard launchers can only fire half of its torpedoes at a time. Two depth charge rails and 18 depth charges were also installed aft. Yahagi was also equipped with two Aichi E13A aircraft and had a flight deck with a 26-foot catapult.

The engines were a quadruple-shaft geared turbine arrangement with six boilers in five boiler rooms, developing 100,000 shp (75,000 kW) for a maximum speed of 35 knots (65 km/h).

== Service career ==
=== Early career ===
Built at Sasebo Naval Arsenal, Yahagi was laid down on 11 November 1941, launched on 25 October 1942 and completed on 29 December 1943. On completion, she was assigned as Vice Admiral Ozawa Jisaburō's flagship of Destroyer Squadron 10 of the IJN 3rd Fleet. From 1-5 January 1944, Yahagi conducted battle exercises before being dry-docked in Sasebo, where she was refitted with type 21 surface-search radar, before spending the rest of January transiting between Japanese home ports. From February to May, she was dispatched to Singapore for training and for patrols of the Lingga Islands.

On 11 May, Yahagi departed Lingga for Tawi Tawi as part of Admiral Jisaburo Ozawa's "First Carrier Striking Force" to oppose the American Fifth Fleet in a "decisive battle" off Saipan. Yahagi was command ship for DesDiv 10's Asagumo, DesDiv 17's Urakaze, Isokaze and Tanikaze, and DesDiv 61's Wakatsuki, Hatsuzuki, Akizuki and Shimotsuki, screening the aircraft carriers. On the 15th, Yahagi conducted training exercises and remained on Tawi Tawi for the rest of the month, eventually being resupplied by the store ship Kitakami Maru on 8 June.

On the 13th, the order from Tokyo was sent to begin Operation A-GO, where Japan's aircraft carrier fleet would protect the Marianas from allied invasion in what would hopefully enact Japan's Kantai Kessen engagement which had been planned since the start of the Pacific War. Thus, Yahagi finally departed Tawi Tawi as an escort to the aircraft carriers Hiyō and Junyō and the light carrier Ryūhō. On that same day, the fleet was spotted by the submarine USS Redfin, alerting the allies to their operation. The fleet stopped at the Guimaras for refueling the next day, before sailing for Saipan the day after. The Battle of the Philippine Sea finally began on 19 June 1944, but not by carrier action. Instead, a Wolfpack of submarines attacked the Japanese fleet and downed two of their best aircraft carriers; USS Albacore sinking the new armored aircraft carrier Taihō and USS Cavalla sinking the veteran aircraft carrier Shōkaku. Yahagi rescued 100 survivors from both carriers before the battle continued. The next day, American carrier aircraft decimated the fleet. Alongside destroying over 400 Japanese warplanes, torpedo bombers from the light carrier USS Belleau Wood sank the Hiyō, while dive bombers from the aircraft carrier USS Wasp sank the oil tankers Seiyo Maru and Genyo Maru, ending the battle of the Philippine Sea in a crushing Japanese defeat. On 20 June, Yahagi joined the rest of the fleet in retreat, refueling at Okinawa before anchoring at Hashirajima on the 24th.

Yahagi spent the rest of June to early July dry-docked in Kure and was fitted with two additional triple-mount Type 96 25 mm AT/AA Gun mounts amidships and type 13 air-search and type 22 surface-search radar sets. On 8 July, Yahagi departed Kure with troops, and numerous battleships, cruisers and destroyers. They briefly stopped at Okinawa, Manila, and Singapore before finally arriving at Lingga on the 20th, where Yahagi embarked on training duties until 16 August. Yahagi was dry docked in Singapore the next day until the 28th for upkeep, and returned to Linga the day after that where she remained for the following months, being restocked by Kitakami Maru on 30 September.

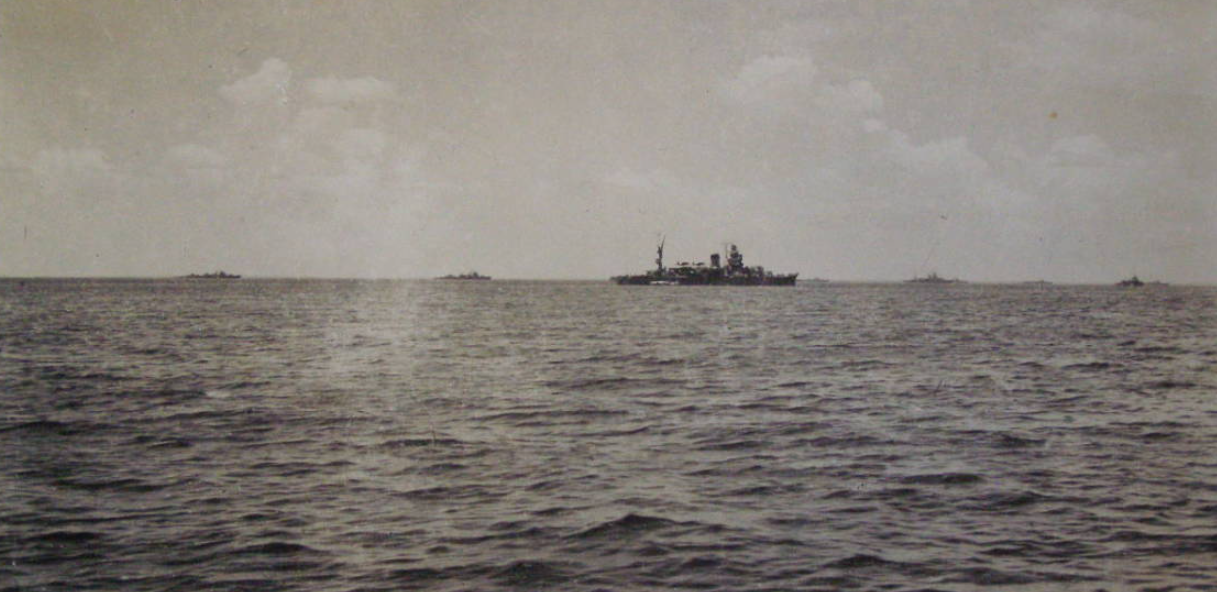
Yahagi anchored in Brunei, 21 October 1944. The destroyer Nowaki is moored ahead of her, and the light cruiser Noshiro and several Yūgumo class destroyers are seen in the distance

On 18 October, Yahagi finally departed Lingga with the rest of the Japanese fleet for Brunei, arriving on the 20th, in preparation for Operation Sho-Go, later known as the battle of Leyte Gulf. The allies were enacting a massive invasion of the Philippines, which acted as a crucial supply lane in-between mainland Japan and the oil fields of the Dutch East Indies, and a US recapture would cripple Japan's war effort. Because of this, Yahagi was assigned to a massive surface fleet commanded by Vice Admiral Kurita to hunt down and destroy the allied invasion convoys destined for the Philippines while the depleted Japanese aircraft carrier fleet lured out and distracted allied carrier task forces as a decoy group. The fleet consisted of 5 battleships - including the Yamato and Musashi, the largest and most powerful battleships in the world - 10 heavy cruisers, 2 light cruisers, and 15 destroyers. The force departed Brunei on the 22nd, where Yahagi was assigned to the second ring consisting of the Musashi, the older but still capable battleships Kongō and Haruna, and 4 heavy cruisers. Yahagi was responsible for leading 6 destroyers, the Urakaze, Isokaze, Hamakaze, Yukikaze, Nowaki, and Kiyoshimo.

In the morning of the 23rd, the force was spotted by American submarines which took out three heavy cruisers; USS Darter sank Atago and crippled Takao while USS Dace sank Maya. This alerted the aircraft carriers of Task Force 38 to the Japanese fleet. At 7:30 and 8:00 the next morning, Yahagi launched her floatplanes no 1 and 2 in search for enemy aircraft carriers, but at 10:30 the fleet came under attack by aircraft from TF-38. In turn, at 11:40 the floatplanes successfully discovered a division of American warships from TF-38.4 but mistakenly concluded the presence of enemy battleships. Floatplane no 1 was promptly shot down by American fighter aircraft while no 2 escaped. In exchange, American aircraft damaged several Japanese warships but scored few sinking. Yahagi was attacked by a fight of aircraft from USS Lexington at 13:30 and was hit by two bombs, one smashing into her aft crew spaces and the other starting a small fire in her chain locker that opened a small hole below the waterline on her starboard side, temporarily cutting her speed to 22 knots. However, this was because the majority of attacks were focused on the Musashi, which over a period of nine hours was hit by 17 bombs and 19-20 torpedoes and sank with the loss of 1,023 men. Furthermore, Hamakaze and Kiyoshimo were both damaged during the air raids and forced out of the battle, so Yahagi led her four remaining destroyers with the rest of the diminished task force through the San Bernardino Strait. A false retreat successfully fooled American forces before turning right back towards Leyte 2 hours later.

Likewise in the Battle off Samar on 25 October 1944, Yahagi fought her way through the battle without damage. On 26 October 1944, Force A was attacked by 80 carrier aircraft off Panay, followed by 30 USAAF B-24 Liberator heavy bombers and an additional 60 carrier-based aircraft. Throughout these attacks Yahagi was not hit and returned to Brunei safely.

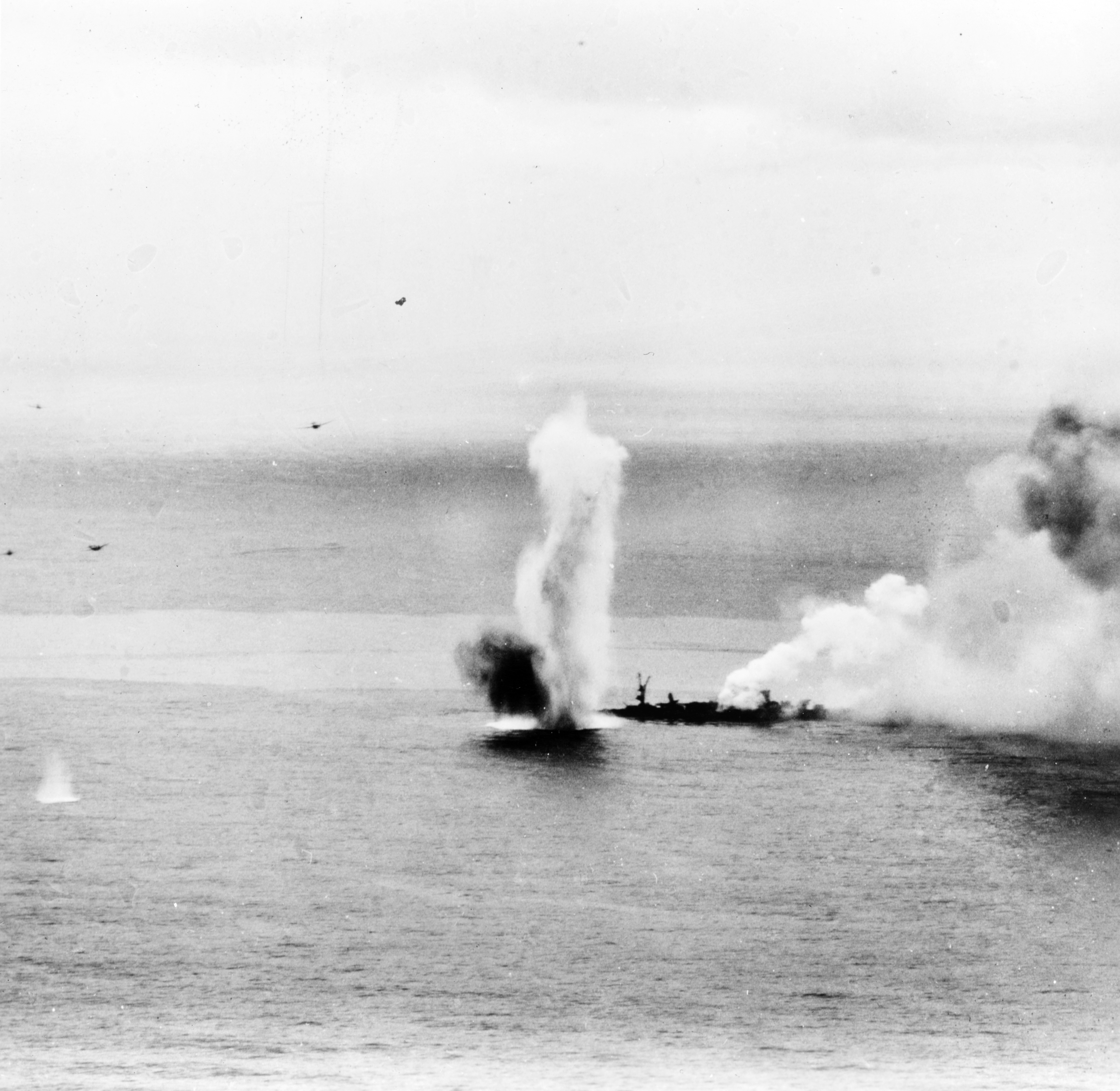
Yahagi sinking

== End of the Imperial Japanese Navy ==
On 16 November 1944, DesRon 10 was deactivated and Yahagi was assigned as the flagship of Rear Admiral Keizō Komura's new DesRon 2. Yahagi was ordered back to Japan on the same day for refit, returning safely to Sasebo on 24 November. She remained in Japanese home waters until March 1945.

On 6 April 1945, Yahagi received orders for "Operation Ten-Go", to attack the American invasion force off Okinawa. Yahagi was ordered to accompany Yamato on its final suicide mission against the American fleet. The operation also included the destroyers Isokaze, Hamakaze, Yukikaze, Kasumi, Hatsushimo, Asashimo, Fuyutsuki and Suzutsuki.

At 1220 on 7 April 1945 the Yamato force was attacked by waves of 386 aircraft (180 fighters, 75 bombers, 131 torpedo planes) from Task Force 58.

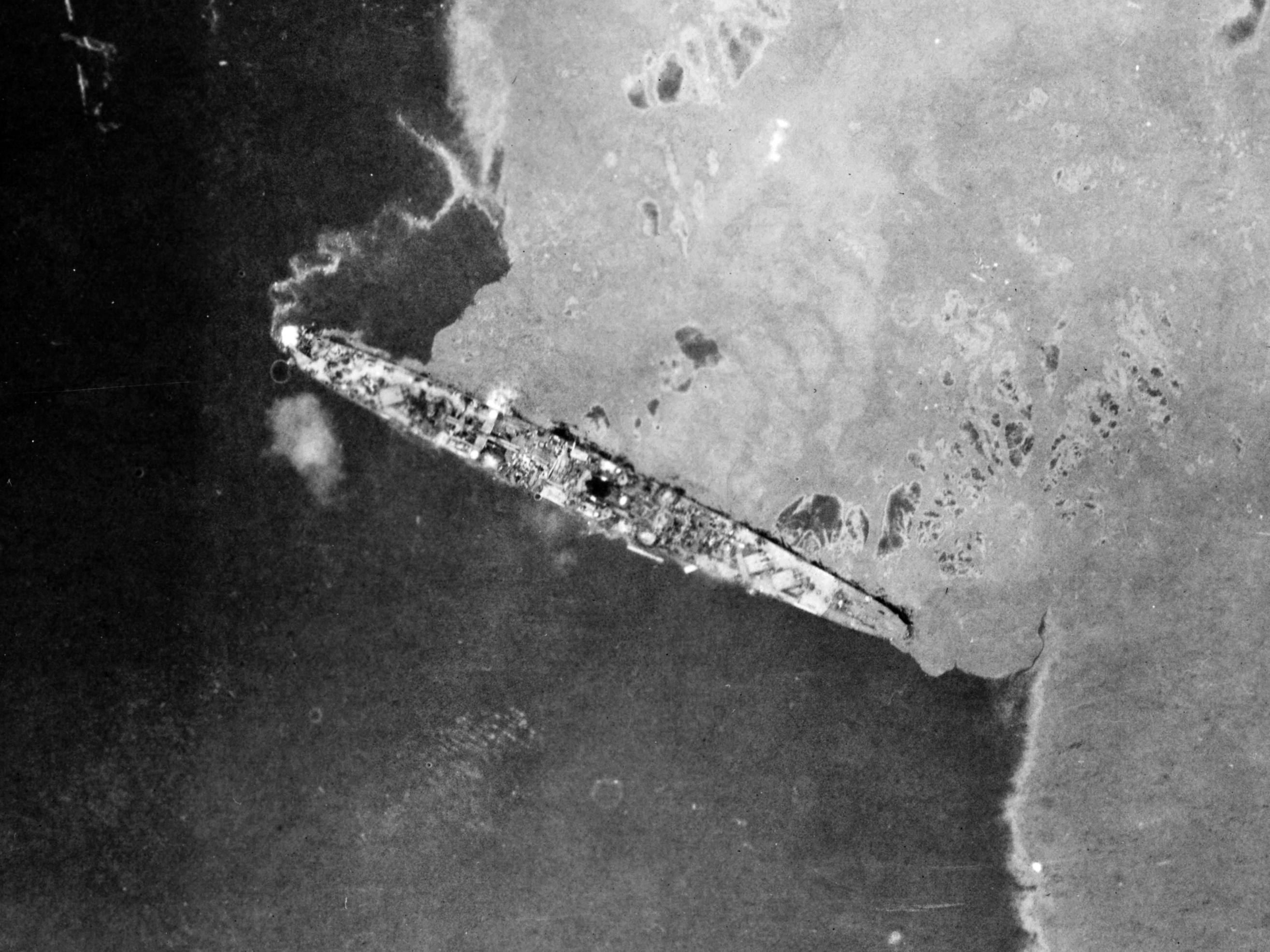
Japanese light cruiser Yahagi lies motionless after a torpedo hit.

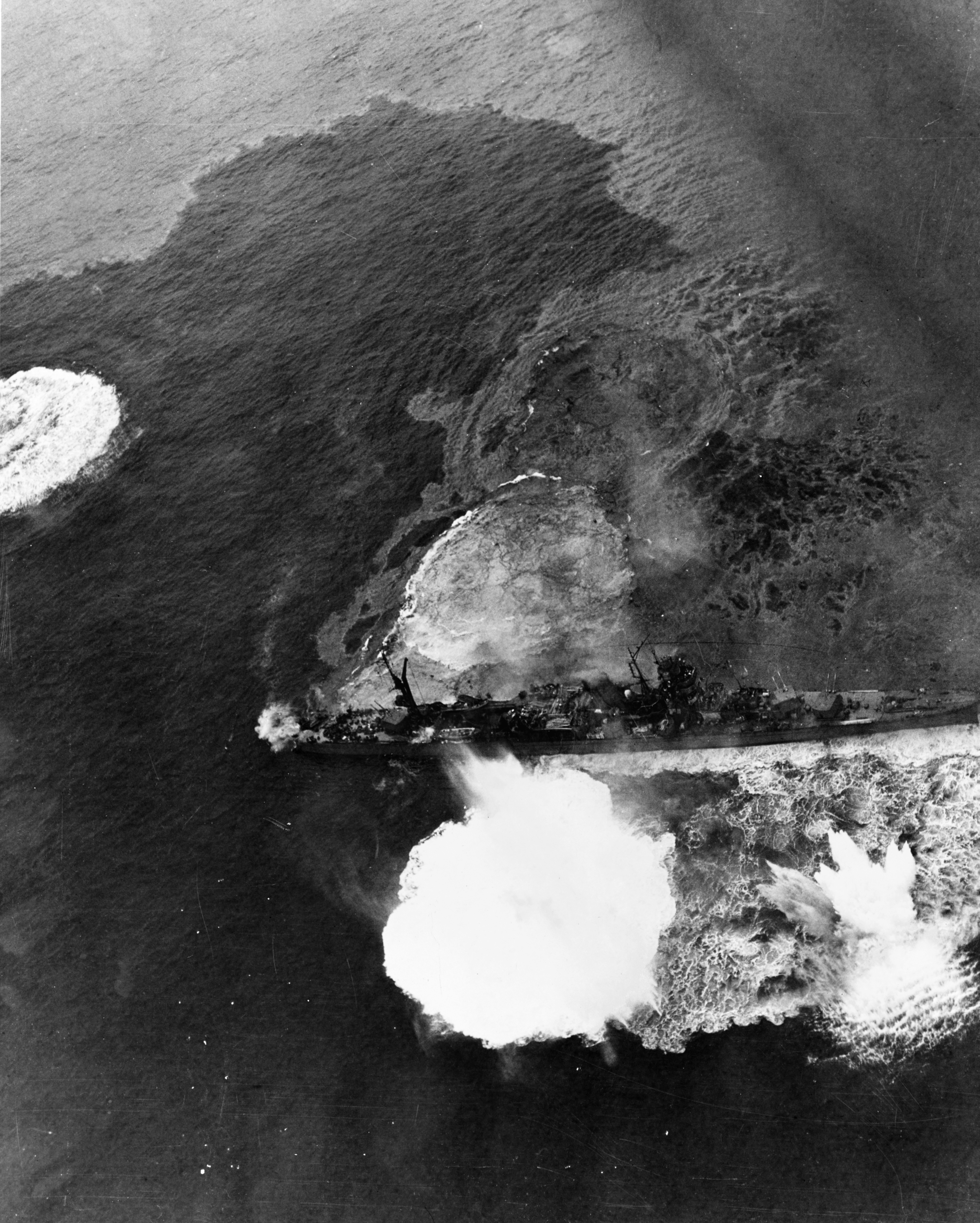
Light cruiser Yahagi under intense bomb and torpedo attack

At 12:46, during the first wave, a torpedo hit Yahagi directly in her engine room, killing the entire engineering room crew and bringing her to a complete stop. Dead in the water, Yahagi was hit by at least six more torpedoes and 12 bombs by succeeding waves of air attacks. Isokaze attempted to come to Yahagi's aid but was attacked, heavily damaged, and sank sometime later. Yahagi capsized towards her starboard side, and sank at 14:05 at 30°47′N 128°08′E taking 445 crewmen with her. Rear Admiral Komura and Captain Tameichi Hara were among the survivors rescued by Hatsushimo and Yukikaze. Her survivors could see Yamato in the distance, still steaming south as U.S. aircraft continued their attacks. However, in reality, Yamato was only minutes away from sinking. Yahagi was removed from the navy list on 20 June 1945.

== Sources ==
- Brown, David (1990). Warship Losses of World War Two. Naval Institute Press. ISBN 1-55750-914-X.
- Dull, Paul S. (1978). A Battle History of the Imperial Japanese Navy, 1941-1945. Annapolis, Maryland: Naval Institute Press. ISBN 0-87021-097-1.
- Feifer, George (2001). "Operation Heaven Number One". The Battle of Okinawa: The Blood and the Bomb. The Lyons Press. ISBN 1-58574-215-5.
- Hara, Tameichi (1961). "The Last Sortie". Japanese Destroyer Captain. New York & Toronto: Ballantine Books. ISBN 978-1-59114-354-3. OCLC 255849609. — First-hand account of the battle by the captain of the Japanese cruiser Yahagi.
- Jentschura, Hansgeorg; Jung, Dieter & Mickel, Peter (1977). Warships of the Imperial Japanese Navy, 1869–1945. Annapolis, Maryland: United States Naval Institute. ISBN 0-87021-893-X.
- Lacroix, Eric & Wells II, Linton (1997). Japanese Cruisers of the Pacific War. Annapolis, Maryland: Naval Institute Press. ISBN 0-87021-311-3.
- Skulski, Janusz (1989). The Battleship Yamato. Annapolis, Maryland: Naval Institute Press. ISBN 0-87021-019-X.
- Spurr, Russell (1995). A Glorious Way to Die: The Kamikaze Mission of the Battleship Yamato, April 1945. Newmarket Press. ISBN 1-55704-248-9.
- Stille, Mark (2012). Imperial Japanese Navy Light Cruisers 1941-45. Osprey. ISBN 978-1-84908-562-5.
- Williams, Mike (2012). "Yahagi - One Light Cruiser at Leyte Gulf". In Jordan, John (ed.). Warship 2012. London: Conway. pp. 81–97. ISBN 978-1-84486-156-9.
- Whitley, M.J. (1995). Cruisers of World War Two: An International Encyclopedia. Annapolis, Maryland: Naval Institute Press. ISBN 1-55750-141-6.
