= Agano-class cruiser =

Cruiser class of the Imperial Japanese Navy

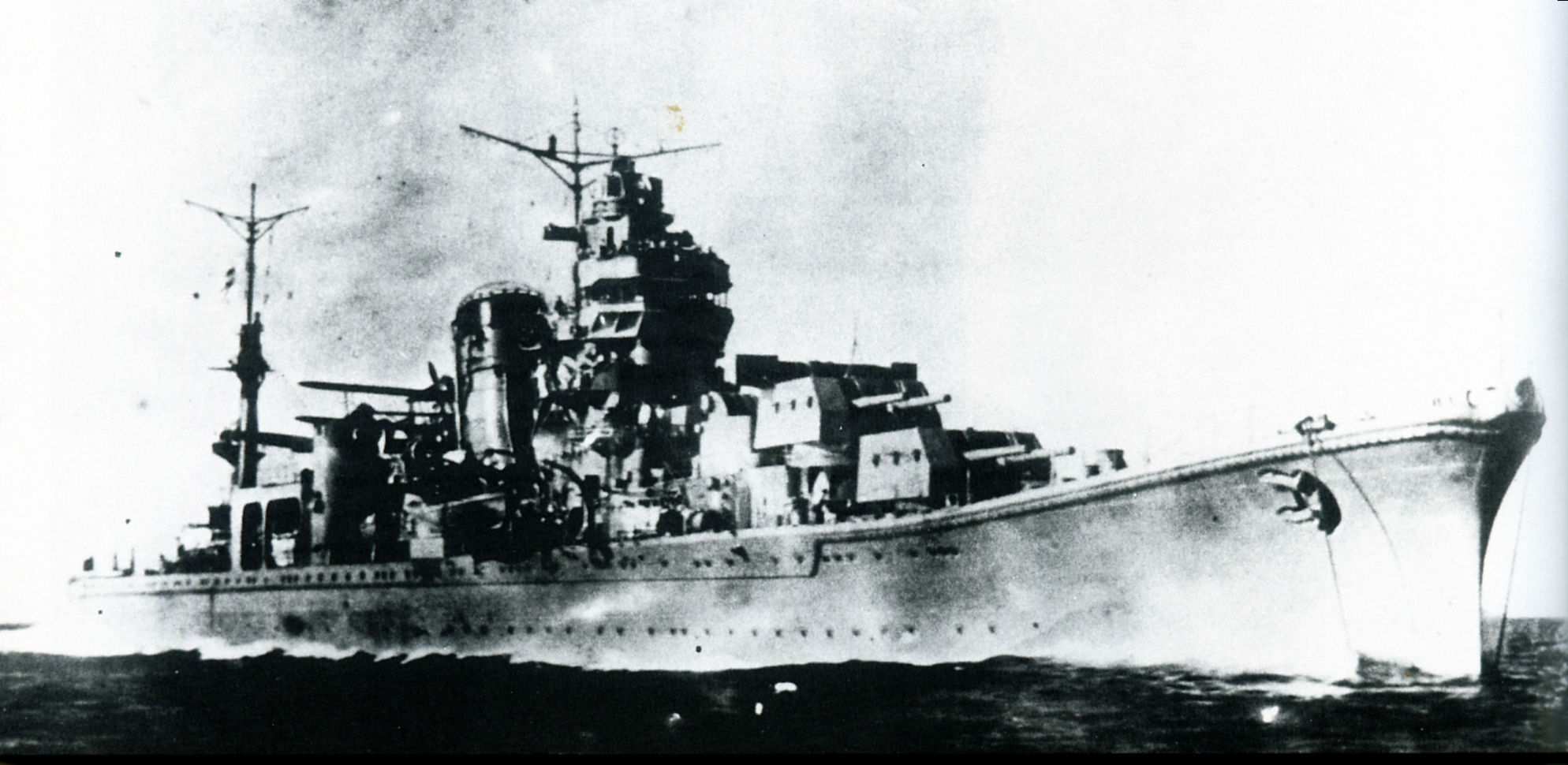
- Agano in October 1942, off of Sasebo, Nagasaki

Class overview
- Name: Agano class
- Builders: Sasebo Naval Arsenal (3); Yokosuka Naval Arsenal (1)
- Operators: Imperial Japanese Navy
- Preceded by: Sendai class
- Succeeded by: Ōyodo class
- Built: 1940-1944
- In commission: 1942-1945
- Completed: 4
- Lost: 3

General characteristics
- Type: Light cruiser
- Displacement: 6,652 t (6,547 long tons) (standard); 7,590 t (7,470 long tons) (loaded)
- Length: 174 m (571 ft)
- Beam: 15.2 m (50 ft)
- Draught: 5.6 m (18 ft)
- Propulsion: 4 shaft Gihon geared turbines; 6 Kampon boilers; 100,000 shp (75,000 kW)
- Speed: 35 knots (65 km/h; 40 mph)
- Range: 8,000 nautical miles (15,000 km) at 18 knots (33 km/h)
- Complement: 730
- Armament: Agano and Noshiro as built: 6 × 152 mm Type 41 guns (3 × 2); 4 × 80 mm Type 98 DP guns (2 × 2); 6 × 25 mm AA guns (2 × 3); 4 × 13.2 mm (0.52 in) Type 93 AA machine guns (2 × 2); 8 × 610 mm torpedo tubes (2 × 4); 16 Type 95 or Type 2 depth charges; 3 Type 88 mines
- Armour: Machinery belt: 60 mm (2.4 in); Magazine belt: 55 mm (2.2 in); Armoured deck: 20 mm (0.8 in); Forward armoured bulkheads: 25 mm (1.0 in) to 20 mm (0.8 in); Rear armoured bulkheads: 20 mm (0.8 in)
- Aircraft carried: 2 × floatplanes
- Aviation facilities: 1 aircraft catapult

The four Agano-class cruisers (阿賀野型軽巡洋艦, Agano-gata keijun'yōkan) were light cruisers operated by the Imperial Japanese Navy. All were named after Japanese rivers. Larger than previous Japanese light cruisers, the Agano-class vessels were fast, but with little protection, and were under-gunned for their size (albeit with a powerful offensive torpedo armament, able to launch up to eight Type 93 "Long Lance" torpedoes in a salvo). They participated in numerous actions throughout World War II.

The Agano class was followed by the larger Ōyodo-class cruiser, of which only a single vessel was completed.

== Background ==
The Imperial Japanese Navy had developed a standardized design for light cruisers as flagships for destroyer and submarine squadrons, based on a 5,500 ton displacement, shortly after World War I. However, by the 1930s these vessels were obsolete, as contemporary destroyers were faster, carried more powerful armament, and had greater endurance. As soon as the restrictions of the London Naval Treaty were removed, the Navy General Staff developed a plan within the Fourth Fleet Supplemental Budget to build 13 new 6000 ton cruisers between 1939 and 1945 to replace the Tenryū, Kuma, and Nagara-class cruisers. These vessels were intended to be the flagships for six destroyer squadrons and seven submarine squadrons. The new design was finalised in October 1937; however, construction was delayed due to overloading of the Japanese shipyards. Construction costs came to 16.4 million yen per vessel.

== Design and description ==
The design for the Agano class was based on technologies developed for the light cruiser Yūbari, resulting in a graceful and uncluttered deck line and single funnel. Unlike most Japanese designs, the Agano class was not overweight, so it exhibited good stability and seaworthiness. The ships measured 174.1 meters (571 ft 2 in) long overall with a beam of 15.2 meters (49 ft 10 in) and had a draft of 5.63 meters (18 ft 6 in). They displaced 6,652 metric tons (6,547 long tons) at standard load and 8,534 metric tons (8,399 long tons) at deep load. The ships had a crew of 51 officers and 649 enlisted men; assignment as a flagship added 6 officers and 20 more sailors.

The Agano class had four geared steam turbines, each driving a single propeller shaft, using steam provided by six Kampon Ro Gō water-tube boilers. The turbines were designed to produce a total of 100,000 shaft horsepower (75,000 kW) and give the ships a speed of 35 knots (65 km/h; 40 mph). The ships carried enough fuel oil to give them a range of 6,300 nautical miles (11,700 km; 7,200 mi) at a speed of 18 knots (33 km/h; 21 mph).

=== Armament and protection ===
The main armament of the Agano class consisted of six 15-centimeter (6 in) 41st Year Type guns in three twin-gun turrets, two in front of the superstructure and one aft. The secondary armament included four 8-centimeter (3 in) 98th Year Type anti-aircraft (AA) guns in two twin turrets amidships. The suite of light anti-aircraft weapons included a pair of triple mounts for 2.5-centimeter (1 in) Type 96 AA guns and two twin-gun mounts for 13.2 mm (0.5 in) Type 93 anti-aircraft machineguns. The ships also had two quadruple torpedo launchers for 61-centimeter (24 in) Type 93 (Long Lance) torpedoes on the centerline and had a reload system with eight spare torpedoes. The Agano-class ships were also fitted with a pair of Aichi E13A floatplanes and a catapult. The first two vessels in the class (Agano and Noshiro) had a larger 26-meter (85 ft 4 in) catapult, while the later Yahagi and Sakawa had a shorter 19-meter catapult. To detect submarines, the Aganos were equipped with a Type 93 Model 2 hydrophone installation and a Type 93 Model 3 sonar. They were equipped with two depth charge chutes for 18 depth charges.

It was originally supposed to equip them with nine 155mm guns in three triple turrets like those used in their successor, triple torpedo tubes and no 8 cm guns, but the triple 155mm turrets were too large for the ships. Therefore the main battery was changed to four twin 152mm turrets. Then it was decided to strengthen the torpedo armament, so number three turret was removed, and the weight saved went into quad torpedo tubes, the 8 cm guns and extra light antiaircraft guns.

The propulsion machinery was protected by a waterline armor belt 60 millimeters (2.4 in) thick with 20 millimeters (0.8 in) transverse bulkheads at fore and aft of the machinery and a middle deck of the same thickness. The ships' magazines were enclosed in armored boxes with 55-millimeter (2.2 in) sides, 20-millimeter tops and 20- or 25-millimeter ends. The armor protecting the steering gear ranged from 16–30 millimeters (0.6–1.2 in) in thickness and the armor plates on the gun turrets were 19 millimeters (0.7 in) thick.

All of the vessels in the class were updated with additional anti-aircraft weaponry and radar at various points in their service lives.

== Ships in class ==
Four ships were budgeted under the 1939 4th Naval Replenishment Programme, three from the Sasebo Naval Arsenal and one from Yokosuka Naval Arsenal.

List of Agano-class cruisers
Name	Builder	Laid down	Launched	Commissioned	Fate
Agano	Sasebo Naval Arsenal	18 June 1940	22 October 1941	31 October 1942	Torpedoed, 16 February 1944, in the course of Operation Hailstone
Noshiro	Yokosuka Naval Arsenal	4 September 1941	19 July 1942	30 June 1943	Sunk in air attack, 26 October 1944, following the Battle off Samar
Yahagi	Sasebo Naval Arsenal	11 November 1941	25 October 1942	29 December 1943	Sunk in air attack, 7 April 1945
Sakawa	Sasebo Naval Arsenal	21 November 1942	9 April 1944	30 November 1944	Sunk as target ship, 2 July 1946

=== Agano ===
Completed on 31 October 1942, Agano participated in the battles for Guadalcanal and the Solomon Islands during 1943. Agano was badly damaged in Rabaul harbor by aircraft from the aircraft carriers USS Saratoga and USS Princeton, and in a subsequent attack by aircraft from TF38 on 11 November she received a torpedo hit. Ordered to home waters for repair, she was torpedoed and sunk north of Truk by the US submarine USS Skate (SS-305), on 16 February 1944.

=== Noshiro ===
Commissioned on 30 June 1943, Noshiro participated in operations in the Solomon Islands and was damaged during the US carrier aircraft raids on Rabaul on 5 November 1943. She served in the Marianas in the summer of 1944, and was part of Admiral Kurita's force during the Battle of the Philippine Sea. At the Battle of Leyte Gulf in October 1944. She was west of Panay while withdrawing from the Battle off Samar on the morning of 26 October when she was sunk by aircraft from USS Wasp and USS Cowpens.

=== Yahagi ===
Commissioned on 29 December 1943 Yahagi saw action in the Marianas in May/June 1944, during the Battle of the Philippine Sea, and during the Battle of Leyte Gulf. After the US invasion of Okinawa on 1 April 1945, she was ordered to accompany the battleship Yamato on its suicide mission against the American fleet at Okinawa. Yahagi was hit by some seven torpedoes as well as a dozen bombs, and sank on the afternoon of 7 April 1945.

=== Sakawa ===
Sakawa was not completed until the end of 1944, by which time there was little fuel available. She survived the war unscratched and was used as a transport to return demilitarized troops from New Guinea and other areas after the war. She was expended in the atom bomb tests at Bikini Atoll in 1946.

== Sources ==
- Dull, Paul S. (1978). A Battle History of the Imperial Japanese Navy, 1941-1945. Annapolis, Maryland: Naval Institute Press. ISBN 0-87021-097-1.
- Jentschura, Hansgeorg; Jung, Dieter & Mickel, Peter (1977). Warships of the Imperial Japanese Navy, 1869–1945. Annapolis, Maryland: United States Naval Institute. ISBN 0-87021-893-X.
- Lacroix, Eric & Wells II, Linton (1997). Japanese Cruisers of the Pacific War. Annapolis, Maryland: Naval Institute Press. ISBN 0-87021-311-3.
- Roscoe, Theodore (1949). United States Submarine Operations in World War II. Annapolis, Maryland: Naval Institute Press. ISBN 0-87021-731-3.
- Stille, Mark (2012). Imperial Japanese Navy Light Cruisers 1941-45. Osprey. ISBN 978-1-84908-562-5.
- Whitley, M.J. (1995). Cruisers of World War Two: An International Encyclopedia. Annapolis, Maryland: Naval Institute Press. ISBN 1-55750-141-6.
