= Japanese cruiser Ōyodo =

Imperial Japanese Navy's light cruiser

Coordinates: 34.232°N 132.554°E

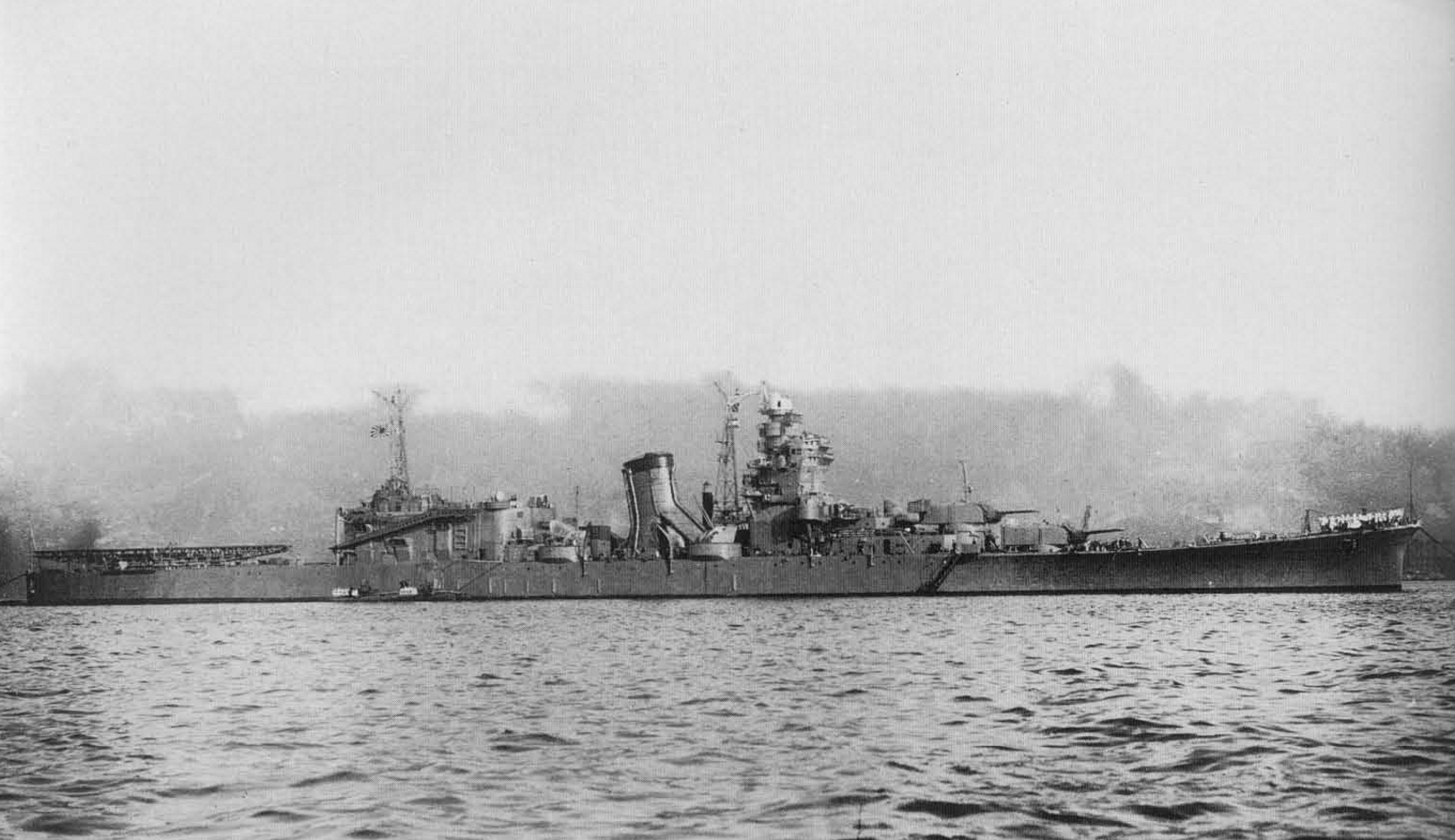
- Ōyodo in 1943 at Kure Naval Arsenal, Hiroshima

Class overview
- Operators: Imperial Japanese Navy
- Preceded by: Agano class
- Succeeded by: C-44 class (planned)
- Planned: 2
- Completed: 1
- Canceled: 1
- Lost: 1

History

Empire of Japan
- Name: Ōyodo
- Namesake: Ōyodo River
- Ordered: 1939
- Builder: Kure Naval Arsenal
- Laid down: 14 February 1941
- Launched: 2 April 1942
- Commissioned: 28 February 1943
- Stricken: 20 November 1945
- Fate: Sunk by aircraft, 28 July 1945, salvaged and scrapped, 1947–1948

General characteristics (as built)
- Type: Light cruiser
- Displacement: 8,164 long tons (8,295 t) (standard); 11,433 long tons (11,616 t) (full load)
- Length: 192 m (629 ft 11 in)
- Beam: 15.7 m (51 ft 6 in)
- Draught: 5.95 m (19 ft 6 in)
- Installed power: 110,000 shp (82,000 kW); 6 Kampon boilers
- Propulsion: 4 shafts; 4 geared steam turbine sets,
- Speed: 35 knots (65 km/h; 40 mph)
- Range: 10,600 nmi (19,600 km; 12,200 mi) at 18 knots (33 km/h; 21 mph)
- Complement: 782
- Armament: 2 × triple 155 mm (6.1 in) guns; 4 × twin 100 mm (3.9 in) AA guns; 6 × triple 25 mm (1 in) AA guns
- Armor: Side belt: 60 mm (2.4 in); Deck: 30–50 mm (1.2–2.0 in); Turrets:25–30 mm (1.0–1.2 in); Barbettes: 25–30 mm (1.0–1.2 in); Conning tower: 40 mm (1.6 in)
- Aircraft carried: 6 × floatplanes

Ōyodo (大淀) was a light cruiser built for the Imperial Japanese Navy (IJN) during World War II, and was the only ship of her class completed before the end of the war. Designed to command submarine operations, she was obsolete upon completion in 1943. The ship was used as a transport and to escort the navy's capital ships for the rest of the year. Ōyodo was lightly damaged by American aircraft in early January 1944 during one transport mission and returned home several months later to begin conversion to serve as the flagship of the Combined Fleet.

The ship reverted to her previous roles when the headquarters of the Combined Fleet was moved ashore in September. The following month, she participated in the Battle off Cape Engaño, where she escorted the Japanese carriers attempting to decoy the American carrier fleet supporting the invasion of Leyte away from the landing beaches. Afterwards, the ship was transferred to Southeast Asia and engaged American forces in the Philippines in December where she was slightly damaged by American bombers. In early 1945, Ōyodo participated in Operation Kita, during which she transported aviation gasoline and other strategic materials back to Japan. The ship was damaged by American carrier aircraft in March and repairs were completed two months later. She was sunk with the loss of about 300 men during American airstrikes in July. After the war, Ōyodo was salvaged and scrapped in 1947–1948.

== Background ==
The IJN's concept of submarine warfare was to use long-range submarines in squadrons (sentai) to attack enemy units at extended ranges. These submarines would be coordinated by a cruiser, which would use reconnaissance aircraft to provide targeting information. Originally, it was intended that the Agano-class cruisers would be able to serve in this role, but they proved unsatisfactory. By the late 1930s, the Japanese Navy had defined the need for seven cruisers to support its seven submarine squadrons. Funding for the first two vessels was approved under the 1939 4th Replenishment Program, of which only one, Ōyodo, was begun. Construction of the second ship, intended to be named Niyodo, was suspended on 6 November 1941 because Ōyodo still occupied her intended slipway and was finally cancelled on 3 August 1942.

== Design and description ==
Ōyodo's design was derived from that of the Agano class. Ōyodo retained the same general hull design with a flush deck and bulbous bow, but her superstructure and armament differed to suit her different role. Ōyodo had a length of 189.73 meters (622 ft 6 in) overall, a beam of 16.6 meters (54 ft 6 in) and a draft of 6.1 meters (20 ft 0 in). The ship displaced 10,987 metric tons (10,813 long tons) and had a metacentric height of 1.38 meters (4 ft 6 in) at deep load. Her crew numbered 33 officers and 532 enlisted men as completed.

Ōyodo was powered by four geared steam turbine sets, each driving a single three-bladed 3.6-meter (11 ft 10 in) propeller, using steam provided by six Kampon water-tube boilers that operated at a pressure of 30 kg/cm^{2} (2,942 kPa; 427 psi) and a temperature of 350 °C (662 °F). The turbines were designed to produce 110,000 shaft horsepower (82,000 kW) for a speed of 35 knots (65 km/h; 40 mph). The ship exceeded her designed speed during her sea trials reaching 35.31 knots (65.39 km/h; 40.63 mph) from 115,950 shp (86,460 kW). She stowed 2,445 t (2,406 long tons) of fuel oil, which gave her a range of 10,600 nautical miles (19,600 km; 12,200 mi) at 18 knots (33 km/h; 21 mph). Ōyodo had three turbo generators of 400 kilowatts (540 hp) capacity and two 270-kilowatt (360 hp) diesel generators.

=== Armament and fire control ===
The ship's main battery comprised six 50-caliber 155 mm (6.1 in) 3rd Year Type guns in two triple-gun turrets superfiring forward of the superstructure. The gun was originally developed as a dual-purpose (anti-surface and anti-aircraft) weapon for the Mogami class; when they had their triple 155 mm turrets replaced with twin 203 mm (8 in) turrets, the now-surplus turrets were mounted on Ōyodo (as well as the Yamato-class battleships). Their slow rate of fire of 5 rounds per minute and limited elevation (up to only 55 degrees) made them unsuitable for the anti-aircraft role. The guns fired 55.87-kilogram (123.2 lb) shells at a muzzle velocity of 950 meters per second (3,100 ft/s) to a maximum range of 27,400 meters (30,000 yd) at +45 degrees of elevation. Each gun was provided with 150 rounds.

Ōyodo's heavy anti-aircraft battery consisted of eight 65-caliber 100 mm (3.9 in) Type 98 dual-purpose guns in four twin mounts. The mounts had a range of elevation from -10 degrees to +90 degrees and the guns had a muzzle velocity of 1,010 m/s (3,300 ft/s) with their 13 kilograms (29 lb) projectiles. They had a range of 19,500 meters (21,300 yd) and a height of 13,000 meters (43,000 ft) at maximum elevation. The anti-aircraft armament was completed by eighteen 60-caliber 25 mm (1.0 in) Type 96 light AA guns in six triple mounts. Firing 0.25-kilogram (0.55 lb) shells at a muzzle velocity of 900 m/s (3,000 ft/s). These guns had an effective range of 1,500–3,000 meters (1,600–3,300 yd), and an effective ceiling of 5,500 meters (18,000 ft) at an elevation of 85 degrees. The maximum effective rate of fire was only between 110 and 120 rounds per minute because of the frequent need to change the fifteen-round magazines.

The ship was equipped with a director-control tower above the bridge with a Type 94 gunnery director controlling the main armament. The director was fitted with a 6-meter (19 ft 8 in) rangefinder and the upper gun turret mounted a 8-meter (26 ft 3 in) rangefinder. The Type 98 10 cm guns were controlled by a pair of Type 94 directors positioned at the base of the bridge and the light AA guns were provided with three Type 95 directors, all on the forward superstructure.

=== Aircraft ===
Like the Tone-class heavy cruisers, the Ōyodo-class ships were intended to be scouting cruisers and hence the entire deck of the ship aft of the superstructure was devoted to aircraft facilities. The weight saved by not fitting torpedo tubes was invested instead in a hangar that could house four floatplanes, with two more stowed on deck, and a heavy-duty 44-meter (144 ft) catapult that was necessary for the new Kawanishi E15K Shiun floatplane (Allied reporting name "Norm") that was intended to perform reconnaissance for the submarine flotilla in areas where the enemy had air superiority. To achieve this, the plane was designed with two retractable underwing stabilizing floats and a large central float that could be jettisoned to increase speed. However, the aircraft performed poorly and only fifteen were completed before it was canceled in February 1944. Ōyodo did carry two or three Aichi E13A "Jake" reconnaissance floatplanes during her career.

=== Protection ===
The ship's armor was designed to protect against 155 mm shells and 250-kilogram (550 lb) bombs dropped from an altitude of 3,000 meters (9,800 ft). It had a waterline belt had a maximum thickness of 60 mm (2.4 in) of copper alloy homogeneous armor that protected the propulsion machinery and the bomb magazine; it extended 2.35 m (7 ft 9 in) above the waterline and 1.56 m (5 ft 1 in) below. The armored deck rested on the upper edge of the belt armor and was 30 mm (1.2 in) thick except over the bomb magazine where it increased to 50 mm (2.0 in). The ends of the belt armor were closed off by 35 mm (1.4 in) transverse bulkheads that also increased to 50 mm adjacent to the bomb magazine. The magazine itself had 35 mm sides and a 25 mm front. The steering gear aft was protected by an armored box with 40 mm (1.6 in) sides, a 20 mm (0.8 in) front and a 25 mm rear.

Forward of the boiler rooms, the fire-control center, the 25 mm and 155 mm magazines had armored sides. The latter magazine had 75 mm (3.0 in) plates that tapered to 40 mm at their lower edge. The armor on the other compartments was 60 mm thick reducing to 30 mm at the bottom. The roof of these spaces was 50 mm thick over the 155 mm magazines and reduced to 28 mm over the other compartments. The main gun turrets were protected by 25 mm homogeneous armor plates and their barbettes had 20 mm or 25 mm thick plates. The sides of the conning tower were 40 mm thick and it had a roof 20 mm thick.

== Construction and career ==
Following the Japanese ship-naming conventions for light cruisers, the ship was named after the Ōyodo River in Kyūshū. Ōyodo was laid down at Kure Naval Arsenal on 14 February 1941, launched on 2 April 1942 and completed on 28 February 1943 under the command of Captain Sadatoshi Tomioka. Completed without any radar, a Type 21 early-warning radar was installed in April 1943 while the ship was still working up.

The war had developed in ways unanticipated by the IJN and her designed role as a submarine flotilla flagship was no longer necessary or even possible, so the navy settled on using her as an ordinary light cruiser or as a transport. On 1 April, she was assigned to the Third Fleet and was transferred to the Main Body, Mobile Force, a month later. In response to the invasion of Attu Island on 11 May, Ōyodo rendezvoused with three battleships, two aircraft carriers and five heavy cruisers in Tokyo Bay on 22 May. The Americans recaptured Attu before the fleet could depart to counterattack. The following month the ship received a brief refit in Kure.

She loaded troops and supplies on 9 July at Shinagawa and, arrived at Truk, Caroline Islands, on 15 July before continuing on to Rabaul where she arrived on the 21st, returning to Truk five days later and rejoining the Third Fleet. In response to the carrier raid on Tarawa on 18 September, much of the fleet sortied for Eniwetok to search for the American forces before they returned to Truk on 23 September, having failed to locate them. The Japanese had intercepted some American radio traffic that suggested another attack on Wake Island, and on 17 October, Ōyodo and the bulk of the fleet sailed for Eniwetok to be in a position to intercept any such attack, but no attack occurred and the fleet returned to Truk.

Vice Admiral Jisaburō Ozawa, commander of the Third Fleet, hoisted his flag aboard the ship on 6 December. On 30 December Ōyodo participated in an operation to reinforce the garrisons at Rabaul and Kavieng. While returning to Truk on 1 January 1944, Ōyodo was slightly damaged by US aircraft from two aircraft carriers of Task Group 50.2, with two crewmen killed and six wounded. The following day, she rescued 71 survivors from the transport Kiyosumi Maru, which had been torpedoed by an American submarine. Ōyodo returned to Yokosuka on 16 February following the successful American invasion of Kwajalein, and loaded torpedoes and supplies for the Japanese garrison at Saipan, which were delivered on 22 February.

=== Flagship of the Combined Fleet and the Battle off Cape Engaño ===
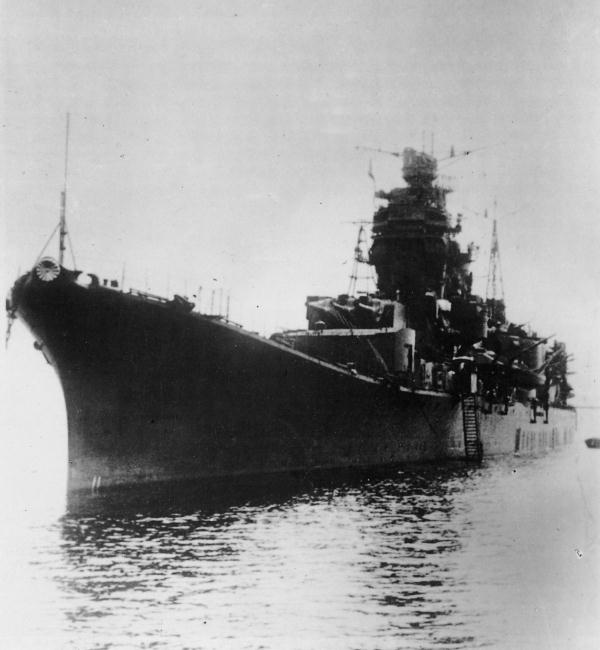
Ōyodo in 1944

On 6 March, Ōyodo went into the dry dock at Yokosuka for a refit to convert her into a flagship, in which her hangar was converted into staff offices and accommodations to take advantage of her elaborate communications suite. The aircraft catapult was exchanged for the shorter (18 m (59 ft)) standard type, and a pair of Type 22 surface search radars were installed. 29 additional Type 96 guns were installed in six triple and eleven single mounts for a total of 47 weapons. The modifications increased her complement to 61 officers and 850 sailors. The day after the refit was finished on 31 March, Ōyodo became the flagship of the Combined Fleet. Admiral Soemu Toyoda, commander of the Combined Fleet, hoisted his flag on her on 4 May. Ōyodo remained in Japanese waters until 11 October. On 29 September, Admiral Toyoda and his staff transferred to the new underground headquarters of the IJN in Yokohama. Six additional Type 96 AA guns in single mounts were installed in early October, along with a Type 13 radar, and her Type 22 radars were modified to allow them to be used for fire control.

Ōyodo rejoined the Main Body of the 1st Mobile Fleet, commanded by Ozawa, on 5 October and departed Yokosuka on 11 October. En route, she was attacked by the submarine USS Trepang which fired six torpedoes, all of which missed. The ship departed Yashima anchorage on 20 October 1944 towards the Philippines as part of Operation "Sho-Ichi-Go"— which was intended to defeat the American invasion of the Philippines. Ōyodo was part of Ozawa's Northern Mobile ("Decoy") Force, which was to bait the American aircraft carrier strike force away from the main Japanese strike force by exposing the surviving Japanese carriers. Ōyodo was the only warship in Ozawa's force that had reconnaissance floatplanes, and both E13A1's performed reconnaissance and anti-submarine patrols over the fleet. On the morning of 24 October, the bulk of the few aircraft aboard the carriers were launched to attack the American carriers as a distraction. They inflicted no damage and caused the Americans to search in the direction from which they had attacked. The Americans finally spotted Ozawa's ships at 16:40, some 200 miles (320 km) east of Cape Engaño, the northeastern tip of Luzon. The American carriers were spread out and it was very late in the day to launch an airstrike, so Admiral William Halsey, commander of the Third Fleet decided to mass his carriers in a position to attack the following morning. Ozawa reversed course during the night, correctly believing that the Americans would follow him north.

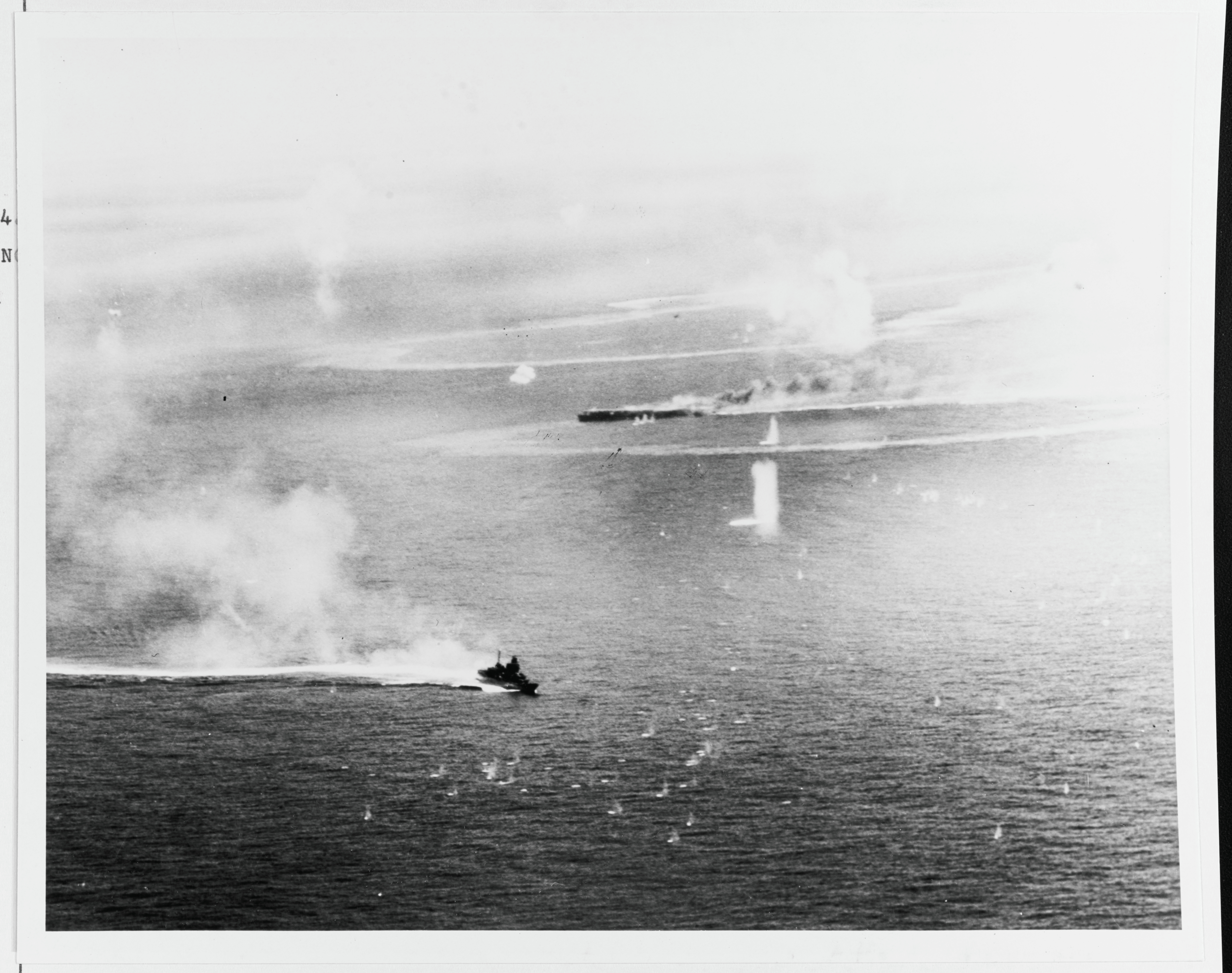
Ōyodo maneuvering through Allied gunfire, while Zuihō begins sinking

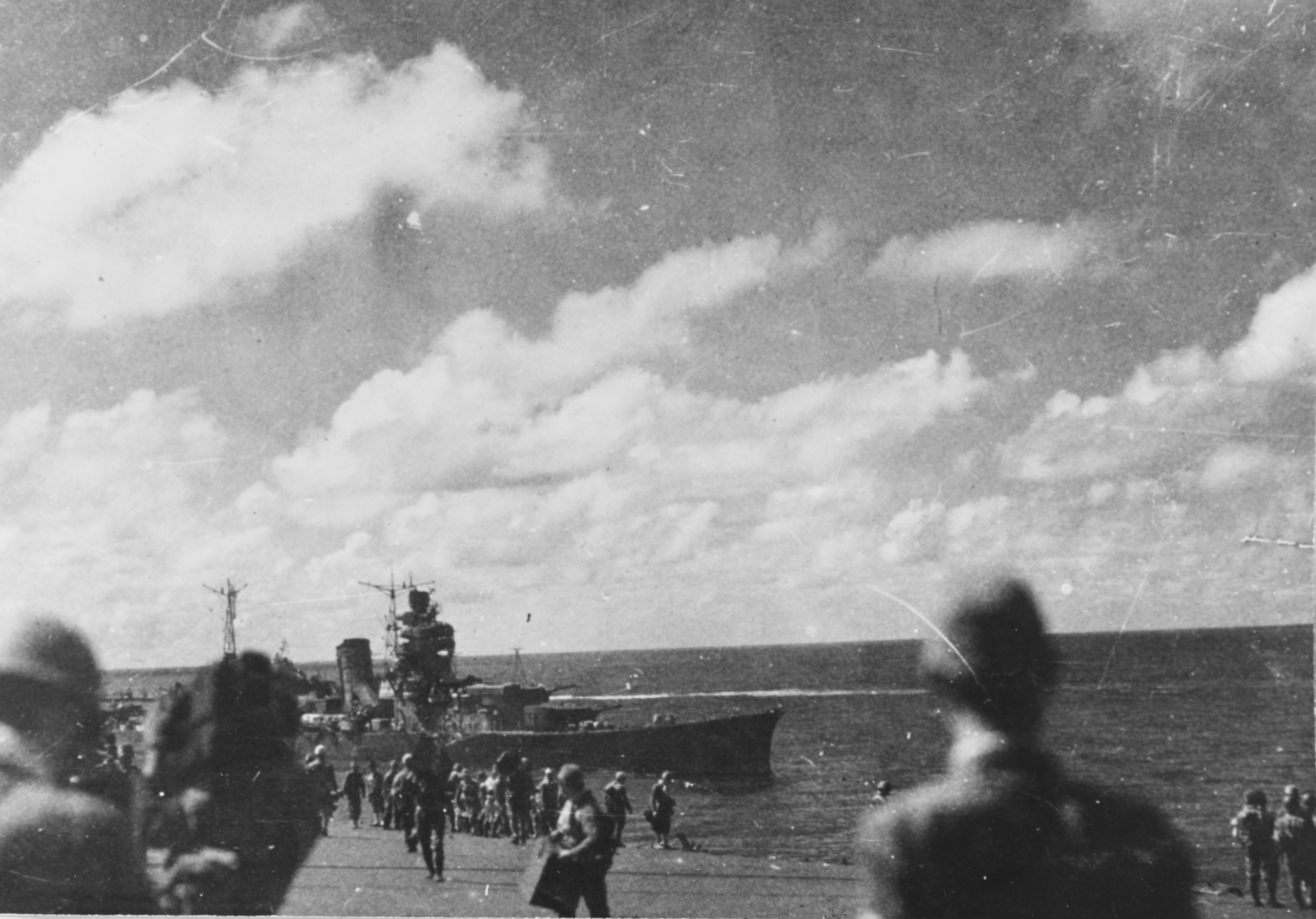
Vice Admiral Ozawa transfers his flag to Ōyodo from the carrier Zuikaku

Although they had lost contact during the night, the Americans did find the Japanese carriers at 07:35. They had already launched an airstrike of 180 aircraft that was orbiting 50 miles (80 km) ahead of the American carriers while waiting for the Japanese ships to be located. This was just the first of a total of five airstrikes that the Americans launched that day. During the first strike, Ōyodo suffered two near-misses, but at 08:48 she was hit by a bomb that damaged a boiler room. At 10:54, Vice Admiral Ozawa left the sinking aircraft carrier Zuikaku and transferred his flag to Ōyodo. Later in the day the ship was hit by two rockets from F6F Hellcat fighter-bombers and damaged by another near-miss and Ozawa ordered his remaining forces to retire northward. Around 19:00 Ozawa learned about a force of destroyers and cruisers that sank the light carrier Chiyoda and drove off the Japanese destroyers rescuing survivors from some of the carriers lost earlier in the day. He ordered the two Ise-class hybrid battleship/carriers and Ōyodo to reverse course and engage the Americans, but they were unable to find them, and they reversed course at 23:30 and headed for Amami Ōshima. When they arrived there on the 27th Ozawa transferred his flag to the battleship Hyūga

=== Final stages of the war ===
A few days later Ōyodo was sent to Manila on a transport run, arriving on 1 November. Three days later she departed for Brunei and remained in the South China Sea area for the next several months. On 24 December Ōyodo, the heavy cruiser Ashigara and six destroyers sortied to attack the American forces at San Jose on the island of Mindoro. They were spotted by American aircraft late the next day and Ōyodo was hit by a pair of 500 lb (230 kg) bombs; one failed to detonate and the other only slightly damaged the cruiser. The destroyers engaged an American convoy escorted by PT boats while the cruisers fired star shells to illuminate the area. They later bombarded a supply dump and set it on fire before returning to Cam Ranh Bay, French Indochina.

Ōyodo arrived in Singapore on 1 January 1945 and was repaired from 9 to 29 January. The following month she was assigned to Operation Kita together with the two Ise-class battleship/carriers and three destroyers. The ships were loaded with critically needed strategic war supplies (aviation gasoline, rubber, tin, zinc, and mercury) and 1,150 surplus oil workers to be ferried back to Japan. The ships sailed from Singapore on 10 February and was spotted by the British submarine HMS Tantalus the following day. Tantalus was forced to submerge by a maritime patrol aircraft and was unable to attack. On 13 February the submarine USS Bergall unsuccessfully attacked the ships as did the submarine USS Blower. Later that afternoon, Ōyodo launched one of her floatplanes which spotted the submarine USS Bashaw on the surface ahead of the convoy. Hyūga opened fire with her main guns and forced Bashaw to submerge when one of her shells landed within 1,600 meters (1 mi) of the submarine. The convoy reached the Matsu Islands, off the Chinese coast, on the 15th and was unsuccessfully attacked by the submarine USS Rasher before they reached Zhoushan Island, near Shanghai, that night. The convoy reached Kure on 20 February, having evaded or escaped pursuit by twenty-three Allied submarines along the way.

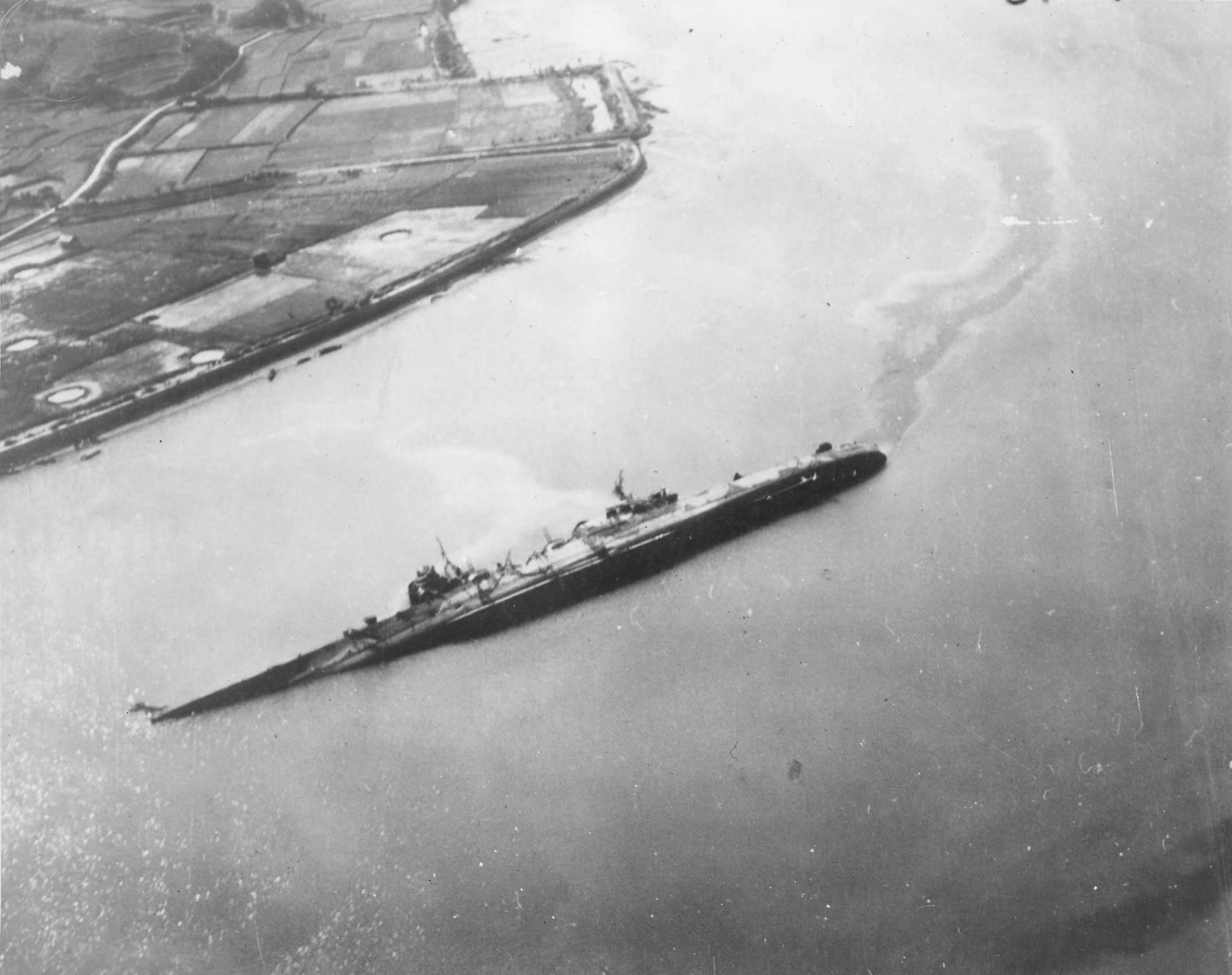
Ōyodo sunk in shallow waters near Kure in 1945

Ōyodo was transferred to the Kure Training Force on 1 March, and, a few weeks later, Vice Admiral Marc Mitscher's Task Force 58 made the first carrier attack on Kure on 19 March. Three 500 lb bombs hit Ōyodo; one hit the port engine room and started fires that badly damaged the propulsion machinery compartments. Another hit the base of the funnel and destroyed the boiler uptakes and the last one detonated inside the ship. Near-misses ruptured some hull plating forward and the cruiser started to flood, but she was towed to Etajima and beached to prevent her from sinking. The bombs killed or wounded 54 crewmen. She was refloated and entered a dry dock for repairs on 23 March which were completed on 4 May.

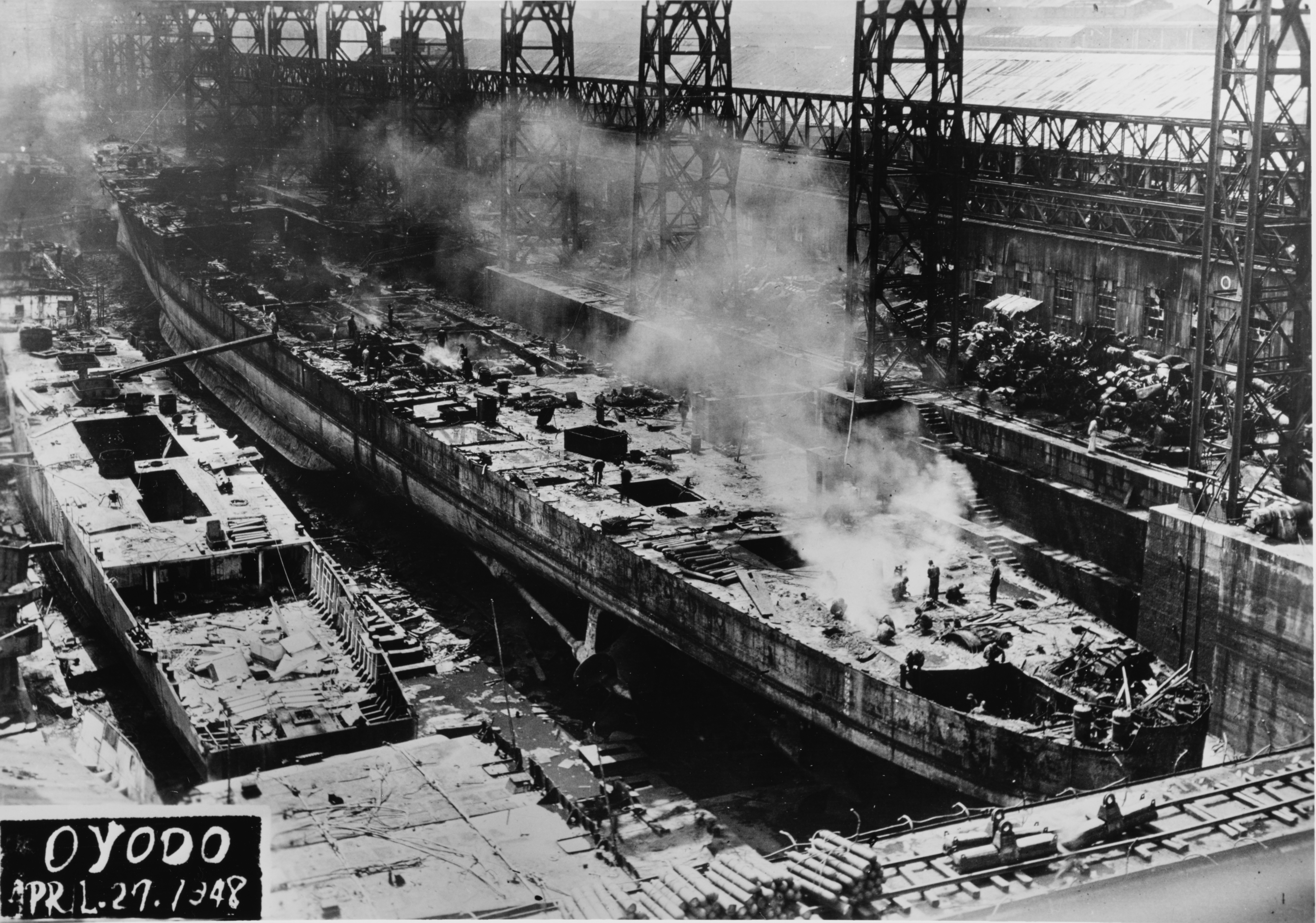
Ōyodo being scrapped in Kure, 27 April 1948

On 24 July US Task Force 38 launched a massive attack to destroy any and all remaining units of the Japanese Navy. Ōyodo was strafed and hit by five 250-pound (110 kg) bombs, two of which hit near her catapult and punched holes in her deck. Two more hit amidships near the engine rooms and the last struck forward of the bridge and started a fire that could not be extinguished for two days. Four days later, a day-long attack was launched by the US carrier fleet. Ōyodo was near-missed by bombs in the morning and the shock waves from their detonations ruptured her hull plating abreast of the forward engine room and No. 5 boiler room that flooded those two compartments. The asymmetric weight of the water on the starboard side caused her to capsize to starboard in shallow water about 25 minutes later. Permission to abandon ship was granted by Captain Shoichi Taguchi before she capsized, but about 300 crewmen were killed.

Ōyodo was removed from the navy list on 20 November. Her wreck was raised on 20 September 1947 and towed to a dry dock to be demolished. The ship was scrapped from 6 January to 1 August 1948.
