= 1st Mobile Fleet (Imperial Japanese Navy) =

- Active: 1 March 1944 – 15 November 1944
- Country: Empire of Japan
- Branch: Imperial Japanese Navy
- Battle honours: Pacific Theatre of World War II

The 1st Mobile Fleet (第一機動艦隊, Dai-Ichi Kidō Kantai) was a fleet of the Imperial Japanese Navy established during World War II.

== Structure ==
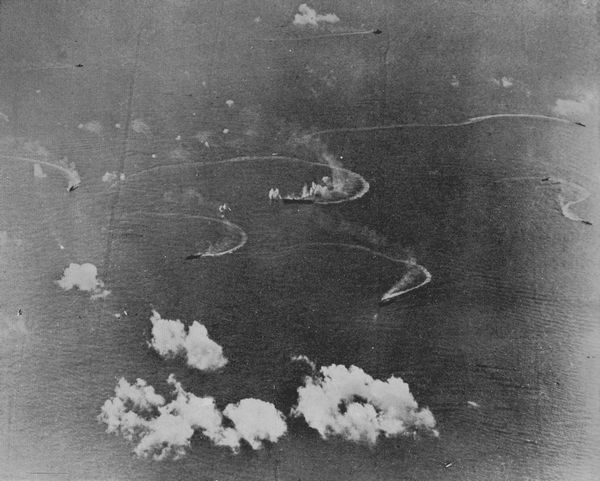
Task Force A, 1st Mobile Fleet during the Battle of the Philippine Sea on 20 June 1944

Date	Higher Fleet	Lower Fleets	Divisions, Squadrons and attached elements
1 March 1944 (original)	Combined Fleet	2nd Fleet	4th CruDiv., 5th CruDiv., 2nd CruDesron.
1 March 1944 (original)	Combined Fleet	3rd Fleet	1st CarDiv., 2nd CarDiv., 3rd BatDiv., 7th CruDiv., 10th CruDesron., Aircraft carrier Chitose, Heavy cruiser Mogami, Light cruiser Ōyodo, 601st NAG
1 April 1944	Combined Fleet	2nd Fleet	4th CruDiv., 5th CruDiv., 7th CruDiv., 2nd CruDesron.
1 April 1944	Combined Fleet	3rd Fleet	1st CarDiv., 2nd CarDiv., 3rd CarDiv., 3rd BatDiv., 10th CruDesron., Heavy cruiser Mogami, 601st NAG
1 May 1944	Combined Fleet	2nd Fleet	4th CruDiv., 5th CruDiv., 7th CruDiv., 2nd CruDesron.
1 May 1944	Combined Fleet	3rd Fleet	1st CarDiv., 2nd CarDiv., 3rd CarDiv., 4th CarDiv., 3rd BatDiv., 10th CruDesron., Heavy cruiser Mogami, 601st NAG
10 July 1944	Combined Fleet	2nd Fleet	1st BatDiv., 4th CruDiv., 5th CruDiv., 7th CruDiv., 2nd CruDesron.
10 July 1944	Combined Fleet	3rd Fleet	1st CarDiv., 3rd CarDiv., 4th CarDiv., 3rd BatDiv., 10th CruDesron., Heavy cruiser Mogami, 601st NAG
15 August 1944	Combined Fleet	2nd Fleet	1st BatDiv., 3rd BatDiv., 4th CruDiv., 5th CruDiv., 7th CruDiv., 2nd CruDesron.
15 August 1944	Combined Fleet	3rd Fleet	1st CarDiv., 3rd CarDiv., 4th CarDiv., 10th CruDesron., Heavy cruiser Mogami, 601st NAG
15 October 1944	Combined Fleet	2nd Fleet	1st BatDiv., 2nd BatDiv., 3rd BatDiv., 4th CruDiv., 5th CruDiv., 7th CruDiv., 2nd CruDesron.
15 October 1944	Combined Fleet	3rd Fleet	1st CarDiv., 3rd CarDiv., 4th CarDiv., 10th CruDesron., Heavy cruiser Mogami, 601st NAG
15 October 1944	Combined Fleet	6th Fleet	7th Subron., 8th Subron., 11th Subron., 15th Subflotilla, 34th Subflotilla, Submarine I-12, 22nd CruDiv., 11th CruDesron., 31st CruDesron., Aircraft carrier Hōshō, Seaplane tender Akitsushima, Auxiliary submarine tender Tsukushi Maru, No.30 Submarine Base Unit, No.31 Submarine Base Unit
15 November 1944	disbanded		

== Commanders ==
Commander in chief

	Rank	Name	Date	Additional post
1	Vice-Admiral	Jisaburō Ozawa	1 March 1944	Commander of the 3rd Fleet and the 1st Carrier Division
1	Vice-Admiral	Jisaburō Ozawa	1 October 1944	Commander of the 3rd Fleet (and direct control for the 3rd Carrier Division)

Chief of staff

	Rank	Name	Date	Additional post
1	Rear-Admiral	Keizō Komura	1 March 1944	Chief of staff of the 3rd Fleet
2	Rear-Admiral	Sueo Ōbayashi	1 October 1944	Chief of staff of the 3rd Fleet

== Bibliography ==
- The Maru Special series, "Ushio Shobō". (Japan)
- Ships of the World series, "Kaijinsha"., (Japan)
