= 15 cm/50 41st Year Type =

15 cm/50 41 Year Type
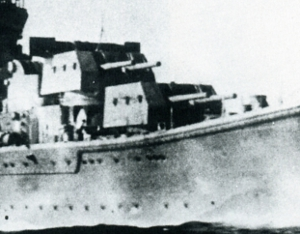
- Twin turrets on Agano, October 1942
- Type: Naval gun, coastal defence
- Place of origin: Japan

Service history
- In service: 1913–1945
- Used by: Imperial Japanese Navy
- Wars: World War I World War II

Production history
- Designed: 1908

Specifications
- Mass: 8,360 kilograms (8.23 long tons; 9.22 short tons)
- Length: 7.8 metres (26 ft)
- Barrel length: 7.6 metres (25 ft)
- Shell: 100 pounds (45 kg)
- Caliber: 6-inch (152.4 mm)
- Elevation: Kongō & Fusō: -5 to +30; Agano: -5 to +55
- Traverse: Kongō & Fusō: -70 to +70; Agano: -150 to +150
- Rate of fire: 6 (effective)
- Muzzle velocity: 850 metres per second (2,800 ft/s)
- Effective firing range: Kongō & Fusō: 18,000 metres (20,000 yd) at 30° Agano: 21,000 metres (23,000 yd) at 45°

The 15 cm/50 41st Year Type gun (50口径四十一式15cm砲, 50-kōkei yonjū-ichi shiki 15-senchi hō) was a naval gun used by the Imperial Japanese Navy before and during World War II. It had a 152 millimetres (6.0 in) bore with a length of 7.6 metres (25 ft) (50 calibre) and fired 45.4 kilograms (100 lb) shell for a distance of 18,000 metres (20,000 yd) (in single mount version) or 21,000 metres (23,000 yd) (in the later twin mounts). The gun was first used in single casemates on the Kongō-class battlecruisers and Fusō-class battleships and later in the Agano-class light cruisers in twin mountings.

== History ==
The Type 41 was a Japanese version of the Vickers "Mark M", originally introduced by Vickers-Armstrong (Barrow) as the secondary battery for the Kongō-class. These original guns were designated by the Japanese Navy as the "Mark II", whereas the Japanese-designed copy (adopted from 1912) were designated as the "Mark III".

In the 1930s, the Kongō-class were modernized, at which time these guns were replaced by new 12.7 cm/40 DP guns. The old guns were placed in storage and were reused on the Agano-class. Some were taken to Guam and were used for coastal defense batteries.

In the Agano-class, the gun could elevate to 55° for anti-aircraft fire; however, its manual loading method allowed a rate of fire of only about 6 rounds per minute, which significantly limited its utility as an anti-aircraft weapon.

== See also ==
=== Weapons of comparable role, performance and era ===
- BL 6 inch Mk XI naval gun : British Empire equivalent naval gun
- 6"/50 caliber gun : US equivalent

== Bibliography ==
- Campbell, John (1985). Naval Weapons of World War Two. Naval Institute Press. ISBN 0-87021-459-4.
- Friedman, Norman (2011). Naval Weapons of World War One: Guns, Torpedoes, Mines and ASW Weapons of All Nations; An Illustrated Directory. Barnsley, UK: Seaforth Publishing. ISBN 978-1-84832-100-7.
