= 8 cm/60 Type 98 naval gun =

8 cm/60 Type 98 gun
- Type: Naval gun
- Place of origin: Japan

Service history
- In service: 1941–1945
- Used by: Imperial Japanese Navy
- Wars: World War II

Production history
- Designed: 1938
- No. built: 28

Specifications
- Mass: 1,320 kilograms (2,910 lb)
- Length: 4.777 meters (15 ft 8.1 in)
- Barrel length: 4.566 meters (14 ft 11.8 in) (bore length)
- Shell: 5.99 kilograms (13.2 lb)
- Caliber: 76.2 millimetres (3.00 in)
- Breech: Horizontal sliding block
- Elevation: -10 to +90°
- Traverse: -150 to +150°
- Rate of fire: 25 (theoretical), 12 (effective)
- Muzzle velocity: 900–920 meters per second (3,000–3,000 ft/s)
- Effective firing range: 13,600 meters (14,900 yd)

The 8 cm/60 Type 98 naval gun (六〇口径九八式八糎高角砲, 60kōkei kyūjū-hachi shiki 8-sanchi kōkakuhō) was a dual-purpose gun used by the Imperial Japanese Navy during World War II.

== Use ==
It was used on the Agano-class light cruisers and the aircraft carrier Ibuki. A total of 28 guns were produced between 1940 and 1944.

Four additional weapons were used as coastal artillery at Maizuru, Kyoto.

== Bibliography ==
- Campbell, John (1985). Naval Weapons of World War II. Annapolis, Maryland: Naval Institute Press. ISBN 0-87021-459-4.
