= Japanese destroyer Naganami =

Yūgumo-class destroyer

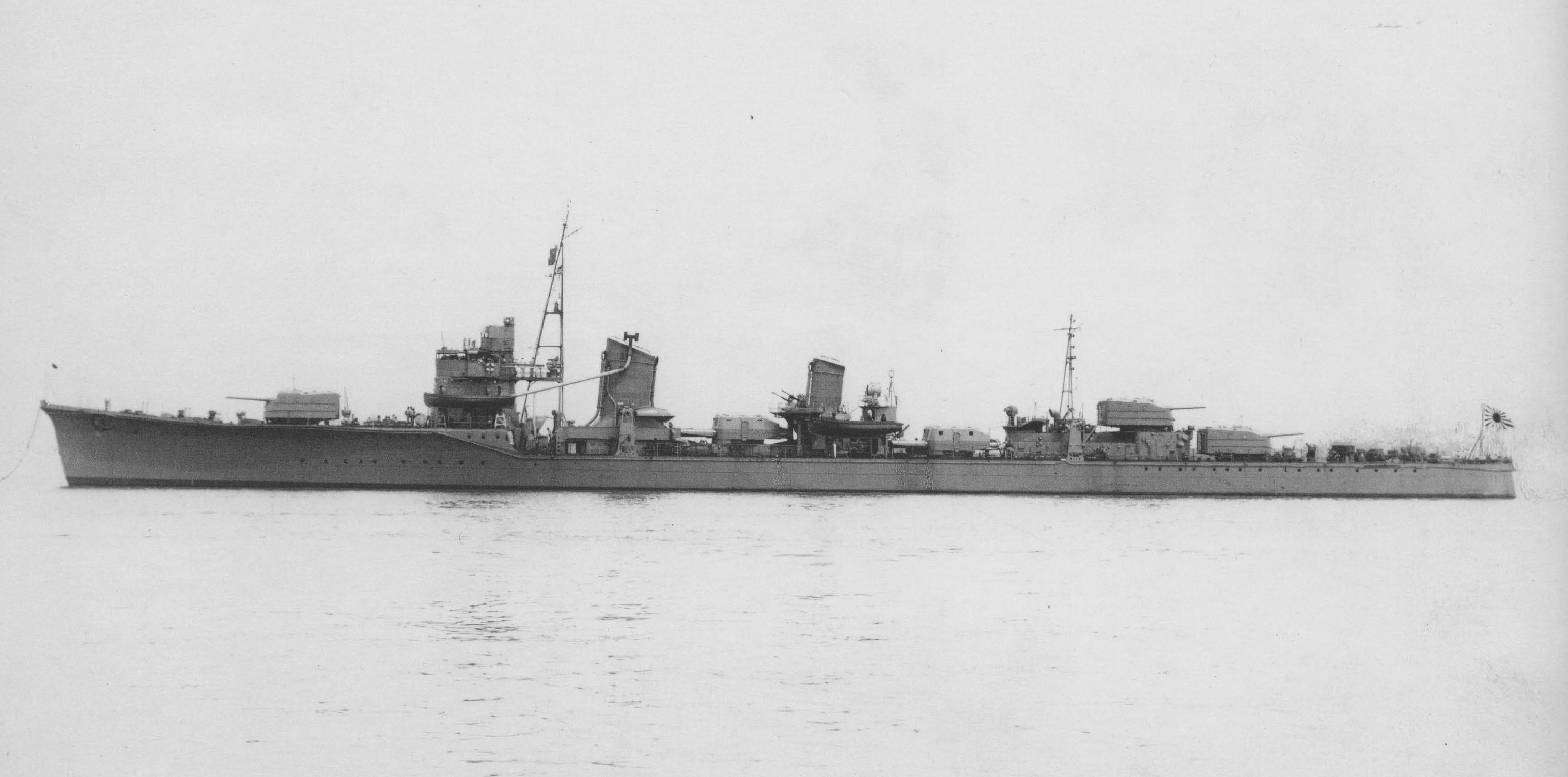
- Naganami in June 1942 at time of completion.

History

Empire of Japan
- Name: Naganami
- Builder: Fujinagata Shipyards, Osaka
- Laid down: 5 April 1941
- Launched: 5 March 1942
- Completed: 30 June 1942
- Stricken: 10 January 1945
- Fate: Sunk in action, 11 November 1944

General characteristics
- Class & type: Yūgumo-class destroyer
- Displacement: 2,520 long tons (2,560 t)
- Length: 119.15 m (390 ft 11 in)
- Beam: 10.8 m (35 ft 5 in)
- Draught: 3.75 m (12 ft 4 in)
- Speed: 35 knots (40 mph; 65 km/h)
- Complement: 228
- Armament: 6 × 127 mm (5.0 in)/50 caliber DP guns; up to 28 × Type 96 25 mm (0.98 in) AA guns; up to 4 × 13.2 mm (0.52 in) AA guns; 8 × 610 mm (24 in) torpedo tubes for Type 93 torpedoes; 36 depth charges

Naganami (長波; "Long Waves") was a Yūgumo-class destroyer of the Imperial Japanese Navy.

== Design and description ==
The Yūgumo class was a repeat of the preceding Kagerō class with minor improvements that increased their anti-aircraft capabilities. Their crew numbered 228 officers and enlisted men. The ships measured 119.17 meters (391 ft 0 in) overall, with a beam of 10.8 meters (35 ft 5 in) and a draft of 3.76 meters (12 ft 4 in). They displaced 2,110 metric tons (2,080 long tons) at standard load and 2,560 metric tons (2,520 long tons) at deep load. The ships had two Kampon geared steam turbines, each driving one propeller shaft, using steam provided by three Kampon water-tube boilers. The turbines were rated at a total of 52,000 shaft horsepower (39,000 kW) for a designed speed of 35 knots (65 km/h; 40 mph).

The main armament of the Yūgumo class consisted of six Type 3 127-millimeter (5.0 in) guns in three twin-gun turrets, one superfiring pair aft and one turret forward of the superstructure. The guns were able to elevate up to 75° to increase their ability against aircraft, but their slow rate of fire, slow traversing speed, and the lack of any sort of high-angle fire-control system meant that they were virtually useless as anti-aircraft guns. They were built with four Type 96 25-millimeter (1.0 in) anti-aircraft guns in two twin-gun mounts, but more of these guns were added over the course of the war. The ships were also armed with eight 610-millimeter (24.0 in) torpedo tubes in a two quadruple traversing mounts; one reload was carried for each tube. Their anti-submarine weapons comprised two depth charge throwers for which 36 depth charges were carried.

== Construction and career ==
Naganami was laid down on 5 April 1941, launched on 5 March 1942, and commissioned on 30 June 1942 at Osaka, where Commander Kumabe Tsutae was appointed control of the destroyer. Naganami spent the first three weeks of her career as a guardship in local waters, before departing Japan for the first time on 20 July as an escort to the transport ship Hakusan Maru from Yokosuka to Kiska where she delivered supplies to the crippled destroyer Shiranui, returning on 4 August. At the end of the month, Naganami was assigned to destroyer division 31 along with her sister ship Makinami, and immediately embarked training duties alongside the battleships Kongō and Haruna, before patrolling off Truk naval base from 6–10 September, and spending the rest of the month anchored in Truk.

The start of October saw the destroyer Takanami appointed as flagship of destroyer division 31, and the 13th–14th saw Naganami escort Kongō and Haruna during the bombardment of Henderson Field; Naganami took no part in the bombardment but successfully chased off attacking torpedo boats with Makinami and Takanami. The three destroyers would however join the heavy cruisers Myōkō and Maya and the light cruiser Isuzu in another attack on Henderson Field and contributed 253 5-inch (127 mm) shells to the bombardment. On the 26th, Naganami escorted the Japanese fleet at the battle of Santa Cruz, operating with the support ships, and watched the battle turn into a Japanese victory which sank the aircraft carrier USS Hornet and the destroyer USS Porter. From 3–5 November, Naganami escorted the heavy cruisers Maya and Suzuya from Truk to the Shortlands before departing for a supply run to Guadalcanal. This was interrupted by air attacks from Henderson Field which mildly damaged Naganami and Takanami with bomb near misses and killed 4 sailors of Naganami and 13 of Takanami, but they continued the mission and dropped off their load safely.

From 13–15 November, Naganami escorted an invasion convoy of 11 transport ship in support of the naval battle of Guadalcanal. On the 14th, the convoy was repeatedly attacked by waves of aircraft from Henderson Field and USS Enterprise which sank 7 of the 11 transports and the heavy cruiser Kinugasa throughout the day, prompting Naganami to rescue 570 survivors from the sunken Shinanogawa Maru. On 16 November 1942, Naganami was appointed as flagship of Destroyer Squadron 2, with Rear Admiral Raizō Tanaka and his staff taking command of the destroyer.

=== Battle of Tassafaronga ===
On the night of the 29th, Naganami departed the Shortlands as flagship of a task force 8 destroyers strong. Rear Admiral Tanaka led Naganami and Takanami as a protection group for six destroyers – Oyashio, Kuroshio, Kagerō, Makinami, Kawakaze, and Suzukaze – each loaded with 200–240 supply drums carrying food and provisions for Japanese troops that were to be tied together and tossed overboard for motorboats to tow for the shores of Guadalcanal, a way for transport runs to quickly sail in and out given the increasing intensity of US forces in the Tokyo Express. The destroyers were spotted and harassed by Allied reconnaissance aircraft throughout the day which informed US Rear Admiral Kinkaid of a Japanese naval group expected to arrive at Guadalcanal later that night, in command of the heavy cruisers USS Minneapolis, New Orleans, Northampton, and Pensacola, the light cruiser Honolulu, and six destroyers, and planned an interception by 23:00 of the 30th, beginning the battle of Tassafaronga. Tanaka ordered the group to increase speed to 24 knots (44 km/h; 28 mph), then to 30 knots (56 km/h; 35 mph) three hours later upon speeding into a rain squall.

Naganami's group was right on schedule as the Americans made radar contact at 23:06 from 22,000 yards (20,000 m) and closed for an attack. In the meantime, Naganami slowed with Kawakaze and Suzukaze while the others continued further down the Guadalcanal coast. Ten minutes later, Takanami made contact with the US formation, resulting in Tanaka aboard Naganami halting the supply drum mission to prepare for combat, and at 23:21 Minneapolis fired the first shots at Takanami, followed by New Orleans and Honolulu. Together, they smothered Takanami with about 50 8-inch (203 mm) and 6-inch (152 mm) shell hits and left her burning, mangled, and crippled. Meanwhile, the American destroyers Fletcher, Perkins, and Drayton unloaded a spread of torpedoes at the Japanese ships, which scored no hits but forced Suzukaze to maneuver away from the action. However, Takanami unloaded a full spread of torpedoes, two of which hit Minneapolis at 23:27 before another hit New Orleans a minute later, blowing the bows clean off both heavy cruisers and taking them out of action.

Naganami ignited her searchlights and illuminated Pensacola, Naganami opened fire at the heavy cruiser with her 127 mm guns as Tanaka ordered a wave of torpedoes to strike the enemy. Oyashio was the first to engage with a full spread of eight torpedoes followed by two from Kuroshio. Naganami then herself contributed eight torpedoes followed by eight more from Kawakaze for a full spread of 26 long lances by 23:33, all the while exchanging gunfire. Five minutes later, a torpedo from Kawakaze smashed into Pensacola amidships which flooded her engine and disabled three of her four 8-inch gun turrets. Honolulu was forced to turn away from the action and barely avoided being torpedoed. However, Northampton continued battle and continuously fired on Naganami for another ten minutes. Naganami was showered in splinters and near misses from Northampton's 8-inch guns but avoided being directly hit once due to Northampton's malfunctioning radar. Northampton's choice to charge the Japanese ships sent her sailing into the vicinity of Kagerō and Makinami which separated from the main formation during the action and dumped their torpedoes to port. Two torpedoes hit Northampton's stern and sank the heavy cruiser over three hours with the loss of 50 men.

Tanaka witnessed the sinking of Northampton from Naganami's bridge before noticing the crippled New Orleans and Minneapolis in the distance; mistaking them for a pair of destroyers set ablaze by Takanami's gunfire. Oyashio and Kuroshio were ordered by Naganami to search for the missing Takanami. Takanami was discovered by the pair but before a rescue could be conducted, they were chased off by the remaining Allied ships. Kuroshio fired another two torpedoes at the crippled Pensacola but failed to score a hit and Destroyer Division 31's flagship sank with the loss of 197 crew, including captain Shimizu Toshio and commander Masami Ogura. With the rest of the force scattered, Naganami ordered the other destroyers to gather around her before departing back to the Shortlands. In spite of Takanami's loss, Tanaka scored a crushing victory. It was concluded on Naganami's bridge Tanaka's force sank two cruisers and one destroyer and heavily damaged two destroyers; the actual losses were one heavy cruiser sunk and three heavy cruisers crippled.

=== Further operations ===
Due to the action off Tassafaronga, the supply drums had to be abandoned, so Naganami led another supply drum transport mission on 3 December. Naganami, Makinami, and the destroyer Yūgure served as a cover force for seven destroyers carrying over 1,500 supply drums. After being tossed overboard, most were lost or destroyed and only 310 found their way to the Japanese army. Upon arriving back at the Shortlands, Tanaka and the Destroyer Squadron 2 staff transferred to the destroyer Teruzuki. Another attempt was undertaken on the 7th, but underway the group was attacked by US aircraft and the destroyer Nowaki was disabled by bomb near misses. Naganami pulled out of formation, hooked cable lines to the crippled Nowaki and began to tow the destroyer to safety while taking the destroyer Ariake with her for protection. A squadron of US patrol torpedo boats dissuaded the rest of the formation and cancelled the supply run as Naganami arrived back at the Shortlands with Nowaki the next day. On the 11th, Naganami departed alongside ten more destroyers for a fourth supply drum run led by Tanaka aboard Teruzuki. However, a squadron of five PT boats attacked the force to decisive results. Kawakaze and Suzukaze sank PT-44, but PT-37 and PT-40 fired their torpedoes and darted off, and two torpedoes hit Teruzuki in the aft engine room and fantail and disabled the destroyer. Naganami and the destroyer Arashi moored alongside Teruzuki for an evacuation. Tanaka and 56 others boarded his former flagship while Arashi rescued 140, leaving Teruzuki to tip by the stern over three hours before her depth charges detonated and sank the destroyer with the loss of nine men. Only 220 of the 1,200 supply drums made it to Japanese forces.

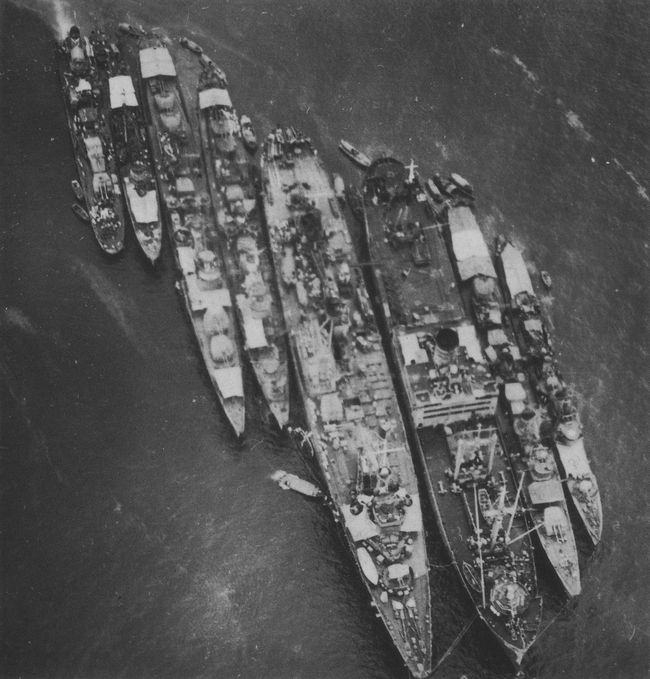
Japanese ships moored against the repair ship Akashi. Naganami is the first destroyer to the left, between Akashi and Akizuki, February 1943

From 16–18 December, Naganami led a troop transport run to Munda and back before steaming from the Shortlands to Rabaul. Later that Christmas, she assisted the destroyer Uzuki and the cargo ship Nankai Maru which had collided with each other, helping to tow both vessels back along with the destroyers Ariake, Urakaze, and Tanikaze. Naganami was reinstated to flagship of Destroyer Squadron 2 under rear admiral Tomiji Koyanagi. On 2 January 1943, she led a supply drum transport run to Guadalcanal, but on the 10th Naganami suffered engine trouble when she wore out a screw shaft which forced a last-minute exclusion from another supply drum mission. On the 12th, Naganami departed from the Shortlands and arrived at Truk on the 14th where she was moored alongside the repair ship Akashi for maintenance, during which flagship duties of destroyer division 31 was handed to the destroyer Ōnami. Her engine shafts were patched up throughout the next two months before she escorted a convoy to Maizuru from 8–17 March where she was docked to finish repairs, leaving for Yokosuka on 20 April. Naganami sailed with the escort carriers Un'yō and Chūyō to Truk from 25–30 April where she remained until 8–13 May when she escorted the battleship Yamato and other heavy units back to Yokosuka before escorting the heavy cruisers Myōkō and Ashigara to Paramushiro then a convoy to Maizuru throughout May, and remained in Maizuru throughout most of June for further repairs to her engines and only left on the 28th for Paramushiro, arriving on 1 July. From 7–17 July, Naganami took part in an attempted evacuation of Kiska which was aborted due to bad weather, then a successful evacuation from 23 July to 1 August; being scraped by the destroyer Hatsushimo due to heavy fog and suffering minor flooding. Naganami escorted the tanker Nippon Maru from 3–7 August where the destroyer was again docked in Maizuru for repairs.

=== Bougainville campaign ===
From 15–20 September, Naganami escorted the heavy cruisers Chōkai and Maya from Yokosuka to Truk before escorting Maya on a troop transport run to Rabaul and back from the 22nd to 27th, but by the start of the next month it became clear the Allies were planning an invasion of Japanese occupied Bougainville, so Naganami escorted heavy units to Rabaul and returned to Truk from 11–15 October, and escorted the Japanese fleet on a failed attempt to counter-act US carrier raids on Eniwetok from the 17th to 26th before returning to Truk again. During this operation, Naganami was reunited with Makinami — which was crippled by bomb near misses earlier that February and taken out of action until then — and for the first time operated with Ōnami despite command of destroyer division 31 being handed to her in January.

==== Battle of the Empress Augusta Bay ====
By the start of November, the Allies began to invade Bougainville, and a naval response was cooked up in short order. The heavy cruisers Myōkō and Haguro were tasked with intercepting Allied naval forces to replicate a battle of Savo Island type victory, and escorting the pair came the light cruisers Agano and Sendai, and six destroyers; Sendai led Shigure, Samidare, and Shiratsuyu, while Agano led Naganami, Hatsukaze, and Wakatsuki. Naganami departed with the others on 1 November, and later that night Japanese floatplanes located the group of American warships protecting the invasion convoys consisting of four light cruisers – Cleveland, Columbia, Denver, and Montpelier – and eight destroyers. The two forces intercepted each other by 2:25 of 2 November 1943, prompting Myōko and Haguro to open fires; their salvos were tight, but their optical based fire control had trouble scoring early hits. In contrast, the four American cruisers opened fire and blasted Sendai in a hail of 6-inch gunfire, leaving the light cruiser a disabled and defenseless floating wreck which sank with the loss of 184 men. In the meantime, Naganami followed Agano as she sailed far-west from the battlefield and had to turn back, unwittingly sailing in the path of the heavy cruisers. After evading US torpedoes and gunfire, Myōko collided with and badly damaged Hatsukaze – severing part of her bow and cutting her speed to 16 knots in reverse – while Haguro barely avoided a collision with Wakatsuki. Naganami fired several salvos at the American ships but failed to score a hit as American destroyers quickly drowned Hatsukaze in 5-inch gunfire and sank the destroyer with the loss of all hands. In exchange, Myōkō and Haguro damaged Denver, Columbia, Montpelier, and the destroyer Spence to varying degrees while Samidare crippled the destroyer Foote with a torpedo that blew off her stern, but the Japanese scored no sinking as they retreated without interrupting the Allied landings, ending the battle of Empress Augusta Bay in American victory.

==== Bombing of Rabaul ====
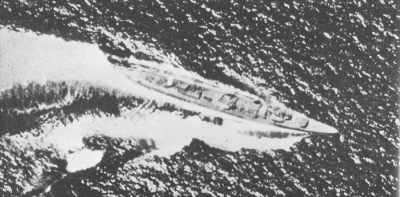
Naganami maneuvering during the bombing of Rabaul, November 1943

The Japanese arrived back at Rabaul later that day, only to be attacked by 160 US Air Force bombers in the first wave of a series of air attacks on the port which became known as the bombing of Rabaul. The attack failed to cause significant damage or casualties but still shook up the Japanese command. However, a significantly more damning wave of air attacks by the aircraft carrier USS Saratoga and light cruiser USS Princeton on the 5th damaged several heavy cruisers and destroyers; most notably permanently destroying the 8-inch (203 mm) turret 3 of the heavy cruiser Maya. Naganami was forced to maneuver in the harbor and avoided damage. However, Naganami did not join the heavy units in retreating from Rabaul as small scale operations were still required in the Bougainville area. From 6–10 November, Ōnami, Naganami, and Makinami served as a cover force for a troop transport run for counter-landings in Cape Torokina. However, on the 11th, another wave of carrier aircraft attacked Rabaul, and several aircraft singled out the cluster of destroyers which included Naganami. The destroyer Suzunami was hit by a torpedo amidships followed by a bomb that exploded in her telegraph room. Suzunami attempted to steer from the stern, but this caused her to nearly collide with Naganami before her torpedo tubes detonated and the destroyer blew apart with the loss of 148 men. Naganami was then attacked by over a dozen aircraft and hit by a torpedo to her stern abaft of her number 3 turret which destroyed her steering and propulsion system, leaving her dead in the water and unnavigable, ending Naganami's participation in the Bougainville campaign.

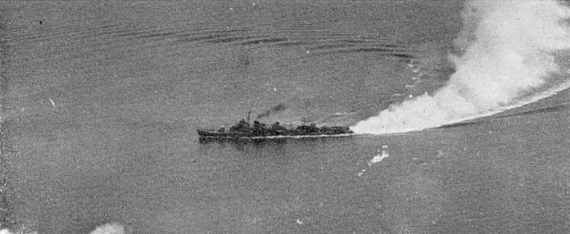
Naganami under air attacks during the battle of Ormoc Bay, 11 November 1944

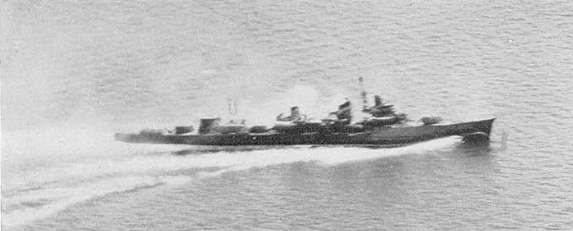
Another photo of Naganami during her final battle

On 23 October 1944, during the Battle of Leyte Gulf, Naganami escorted Admiral Kurita's 1st Diversion Attack Force. During this time period she assisted in the rescue of the survivors of the cruiser Maya, later transferring them to the battleship Musashi. She escorted the damaged cruiser Takao back to Brunei. During the escort, she tried to destroy Darter but she was rather unsuccessful at it and just left afterwards.

On 10 November 1944 Naganami joined the escort of troop convoy TA No. 3 as it approached Ormoc, of what was then known as the Battle of Ormoc Bay. She was sunk by aircraft of Task Force 38 on 11 November in Ormoc Bay, west of Leyte (10°50′N 124°35′E). An explosion amidships broke the ship in two. Her sister Hamanami, destroyers Wakatsuki and Shimakaze were all sunk along with Naganami, as were three transports.

== Rediscovery ==
Naganami' wreck was found in November 2017 by Microsoft co-founder Paul Allen's research ship, RV Petrel 827 feet (252 m) below the surface of Ormoc Bay.
