= Japanese destroyer Kagerō (1938) =

Kagerō-class destroyer

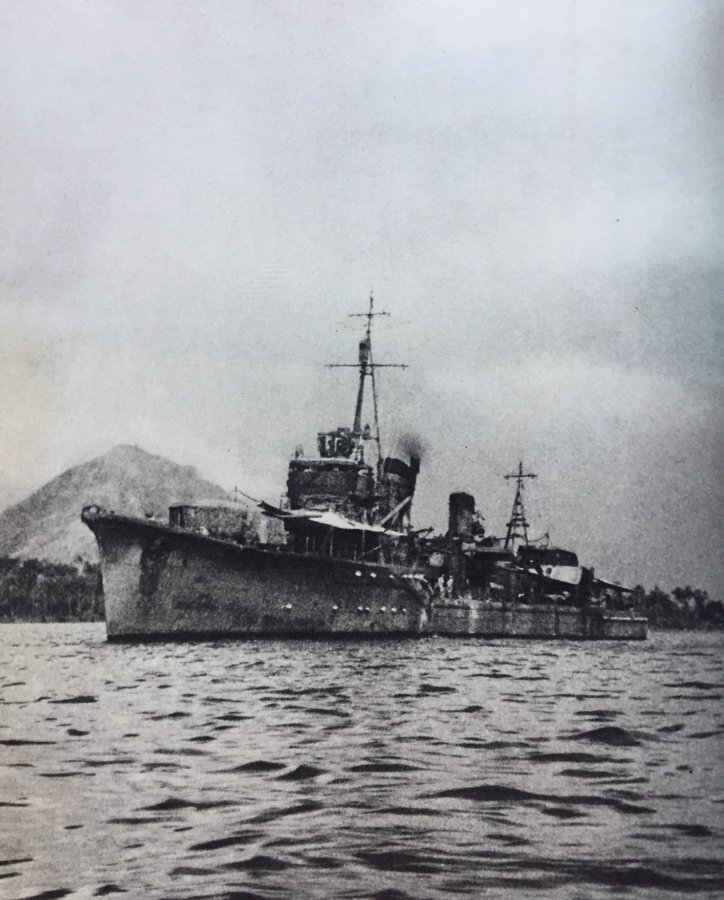
- Kagerō anchored in Rabaul, 27 April 1943

History

Empire of Japan
- Name: Kagerō
- Builder: Maizuru Naval Arsenal
- Laid down: 3 September 1937
- Launched: 27 September 1938
- Completed: 6 November 1939
- Commissioned: 6 November 1939
- Stricken: 20 June 1943
- Fate: Sunk in action, 8 May 1943

General characteristics
- Class & type: Kagerō-class destroyer
- Displacement: 2,033 long tons (2,066 t) standard
- Length: 118.5 m (388 ft 9 in)
- Beam: 10.8 m (35 ft 5 in)
- Draft: 3.8 m (12 ft 6 in)
- Propulsion: 3 × Kampon water tube boilers; 2 × Kanpon impulse turbines; 2 × shafts, 52,000 shp (39 MW)
- Speed: 35.5 knots (40.9 mph; 65.7 km/h)
- Range: 5,000 NM at 18 knots (21 mph; 33 km/h)
- Complement: 239
- Armament: (1939); 6 × 12.7 cm/50 Type 3 DP guns; 4 × Type 96 25 mm AA guns; 8 × 24 in (610 mm) torpedo tubes; 16 depth charges; 2 × paravanes; (1943); 6 × 12.7 cm/50 Type 3 DP guns; 8 × Type 96 25 mm AA guns; 8 × 24 in (610 mm) torpedo tubes; 36 depth charges

Kagerō (陽炎, Heat Haze) was the lead ship of the 19-vessel Kagerō-class destroyers built for the Imperial Japanese Navy in the late-1930s under the Circle Three Supplementary Naval Expansion Program (Maru San Keikaku).

== Design and description ==
The Kagerō-class destroyers were outwardly almost identical to the preceding light cruiser-sized Asashio class, with improvements made by Japanese naval architects to improve stability and to take advantage of Japan's lead in torpedo technology. They were designed to accompany the Japanese main striking force and in both day and night attacks against the United States Navy as it advanced across the Pacific Ocean, according to Japanese naval strategic projections. Despite being one of the most powerful classes of destroyers in the world at the time of their completion, only one survived the Pacific War.

Their crew numbered 240 officers and enlisted men. The ships measured 118.5 meters (388 ft 9 in) overall, with a beam of 10.8 meters (35 ft 5 in) and a draft of 3.76 meters (12 ft 4 in). They displaced 2,065 metric tons (2,032 long tons) at standard load and 2,529 metric tons (2,489 long tons) at deep load. The ships had two Kampon geared steam turbines, each driving one propeller shaft, using steam provided by three Kampon water-tube boilers. The turbines were rated at a total of 52,000 shaft horsepower (39,000 kW) for a designed speed of 35 knots (65 km/h; 40 mph). The ships had a range of 5,000 nautical miles (9,300 km; 5,800 mi) at a speed of 18 knots (33 km/h; 21 mph).

The main armament of the Kagerō class consisted of six Type 3 127-millimeter (5.0 in) guns in three twin-gun turrets, one superfiring pair aft and one turret forward of the superstructure. They were built with four Type 96 25-millimeter (1.0 in) anti-aircraft guns in two twin-gun mounts, but more of these guns were added over the course of the war. The ships were also armed with eight 610-millimeter (24.0 in) torpedo tubes for the oxygen-fueled Type 93 "Long Lance" torpedo in two quadruple traversing mounts; one reload was carried for each tube. Their anti-submarine weapons comprised 16 depth charges.

== Construction and career ==
Kagerō was laid down at the Maizuru Naval Arsenal on 3 September 1937. The ship was launched on 27 September 1938 and commissioned on 6 November 1939.

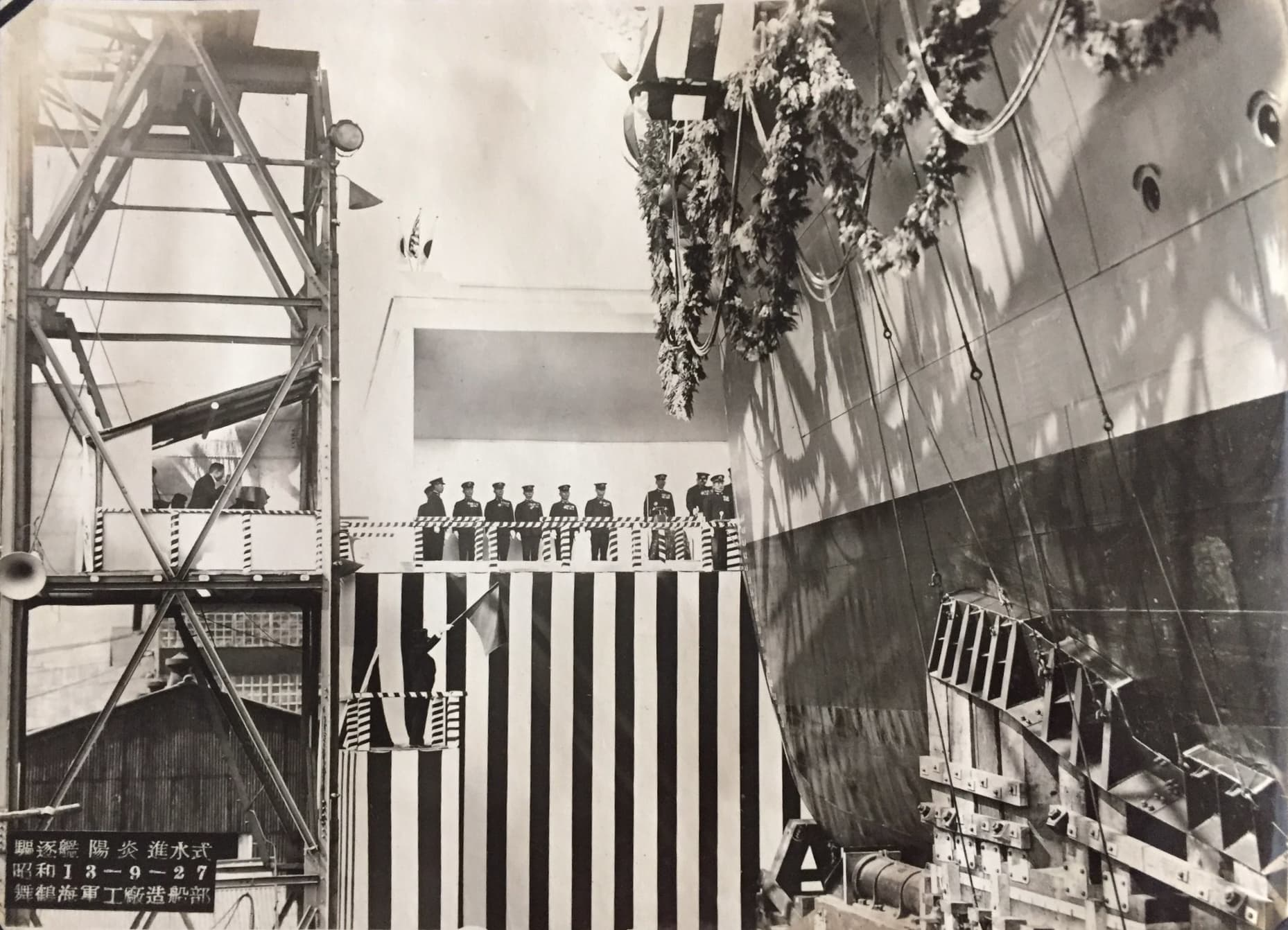
Kagerō on the day of launching, 27 September 1938

At the time of the attack on Pearl Harbor, 7 December 1941, Kagerō, was assigned as part of Destroyer Division 18 (Shiranui, Kagerō, Kasumi, Arare), and a member of Destroyer Squadron 2 of the IJN 2nd Fleet, and had deployed from Etorofu in the Kurile Islands, as part of the escort for Admiral Nagumo's Carrier Strike Force. She returned to Kure on 24 December.

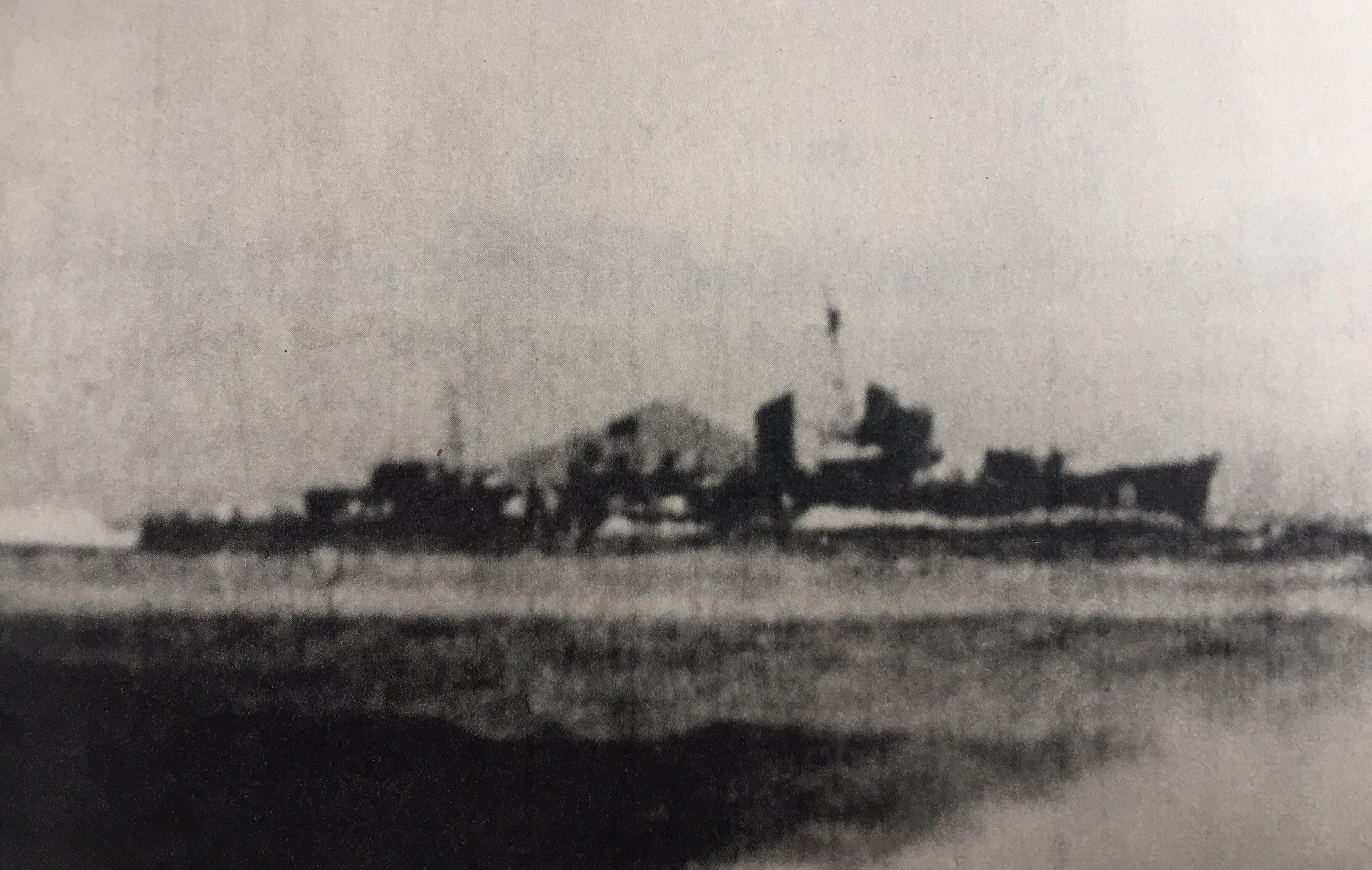
Kagerō on training duty in 1940

In January 1942, Kagerō escorted aircraft carriers Shōkaku and Zuikaku to Truk, and onwards to Rabaul to cover landings of Japanese forces at Rabaul and Kavieng. She returned with Shōkaku from Palau to Yokosuka on 3 February, and spent the following month in training patrols.

On 1 March, Kagerō was escorted the Kido Butai when the force stumbled upon the 8,806-ton Dutch freighter Modjokerto, and a number of destroyers were detached to sink the large cargo ship. Kagerō, Shiranui, Kasumi, Isokaze, Ariake, and Yūgure all opened fire and blasted Modjokerto, sinking her in just 3 minutes without a fight with the loss of 42 men. 26 survivors were rescued.

On 17 March, she departed Yokosuka with Shōkaku and Zuikaku to Staring-baai in Sulawesi, Netherlands East Indies. Kagerō departed Staring-baai on 27 March to escort the carrier force in the Indian Ocean raid. After the Japanese air strikes on Colombo and Trincomalee in Ceylon, she returned to Kure for repairs on 23 April. She deployed from Saipan on 3 June as part of the escort for the troop convoy in the Battle of Midway. Afterwards, she escorted the cruisers Kumano and Suzuya from Truk back to Kure.

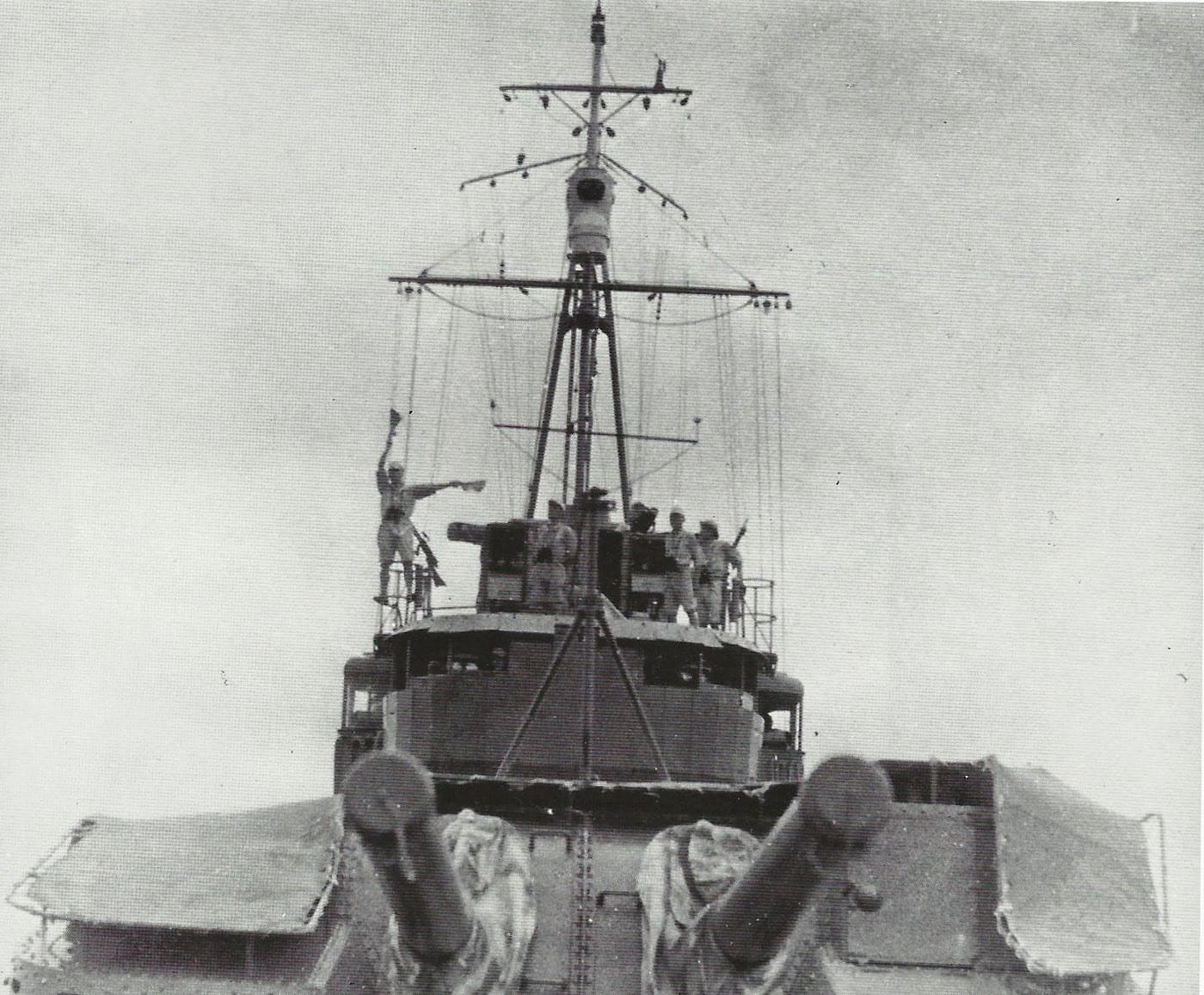
Kagerō's bridge and forward turret in 1942

On 5 July, she was assigned to escort the transport Kikukawa Maru to Kiska in the Aleutian Islands on a supply mission. During this mission, the submarine USS Growler launched a spread of torpedoes that hit every other ship of desdiv 18, sinking Arare and crippling Kasumi and Shiranui. On 8 August, Kagerō assisted in towing the wounded Kasumi back to Japan. On 20 July, she was reassigned to destroyer division 15 (Oyashio, Hayashio, Kuroshio, Kagerō), still within the IJN 2nd Fleet.

In mid-August, Kagerō escorted the cruiser Jintsu to Truk, and continued on from Truk on a high speed transport run to Guadalcanal. For the remainder of 1942 and into February 1943, she was assigned to patrols from Guadalcanal towards Shortland, and to numerous “Tokyo Express" high speed transport operations in the Solomon Islands. During this period, Kagerō escorted aircraft carriers during the battle of the Eastern Solomons on August 24, then escorted carriers at the battle of Santa Cruz on October 26.

In November, Kagerō took part in two major naval battles. On the 15th, Kagerō was involved in the second naval battle of Guadalcanal, where she took part in a torpedo attack on the battleship USS Washington but failed to damage her as Washington sank the battleship Kirishima and the destroyer Ayanami and sent back the entire force.

On the 30th, Kagerō was one of eight destroyers tasked with a supply drum transport mission off Lunga Point. Later that night, the force was dropping their supply off when they were intercepted by a force of five American cruisers and six destroyers, kicking off the battle of Tassafaronga.

As the battle continued, Kagerō lost track of the main formation and sailed away, joined by the destroyer Makinami in abandoning the flotilla, leaving them unable to take part in the main torpedo spreads fired by Takanami, Oyashio, Kuroshio, Kawakaze, and Naganami; Takanami was sunk while the heavy cruisers USS Minneapolis, New Orleans, and Pensacola were crippled by torpedo hits and the light cruiser USS Honolulu was forced to turn away to dodge torpedo spreads.

However, the heavy cruiser USS Northampton turned northwest and continued on alone to engage the Japanese destroyers. This put her right in Kagerō's and Makinami's crosshairs, which had also turned northwest and still had their torpedoes loaded. They noticed the enemy ship and dumped their remaining long lances to the port side at the sole remaining US cruiser, and scored the greatest victory of the battle. Two of their torpedoes gouged into Northampton next to each other on the port side of the ship's rear half, one hitting and destroying engine room, and the other hitting right behind her turret 3. The damage detonated her fuel takes, flooded three of her four propellers and left the cruiser dead in the water, and started a gigantic fire inside the ship. Northampton immediately listed at 10 degrees, and as flooding and fires quickly overwhelmed damage control until the abandon ship order with issued. Over a period of 3 hours, Northampton sank by the stern, taking 50 men with her.

From 3-4 December, Kagerō took part in another supply drum mission, which despite attacks by US aircraft ended in success. A second attempt was canceled on the 7th after an encounter with US PT-boats and the destroyer Nowaki being disabled by US aircraft, before evading a spread of torpedoes from the submarine USS Flying Fish. A third attempt at a supply drum mission commenced on 11 December, where a flight of dive bombers failed to inflict damage on the group while loosing one plane. However, later that night the force was attacked by PT-boats. During the action, destroyers Kawakaze and Suzukaze sank PT-44, but PT-37 and PT-40 fired a spread of torpedoes that sank the destroyer Teruzuki; Admiral Tanaka's flagship. In spite of this, Kagerō and 5 more destroyers successfully completed the supply drum mission and withdrew.

In mid-February 1943, Kagerō returned with the aircraft carrier Junyō via Truk to Kure for repairs. In mid-March Kagerō, Junyō and Hiyō returned to Truk, and Kagerō continued on to Shortlands, arriving on 24 April. After making a troop transport run from Rabaul to Kolombangara on 7 May Kagerō was disabled by a naval mine while leaving Vila port. Barely able to maneuver, she was then attacked by Allied aircraft and sank southwest of Rendova (08°08′S 156°55′E). On Kagerō, 18 crewmen were killed and 36 were wounded. Kagerō was removed from the navy list on 20 June 1943.

== See also ==
- List of ships of the Imperial Japanese Navy

== Books ==
- Brown, David (1990). Warship Losses of World War Two. Naval Institute Press. ISBN 1-55750-914-X.
- D'Albas, Andrieu (1965). Death of a Navy: Japanese Naval Action in World War II. Devin-Adair Pub. ISBN 0-8159-5302-X.
- Evans, David (1979). Kaigun: Strategy, Tactics, and Technology in the Imperial Japanese Navy, 1887–1941. US Naval Institute Press. ISBN 0-87021-192-7.
- Roger Chesneau, ed. (1980). Conway's All the World's Fighting Ships 1922–1946. Grenwitch: Conway Maritime Press. ISBN 0-85177-146-7.
- Howarth, Stephen (1983). The Fighting Ships of the Rising Sun: The Drama of the Imperial Japanese Navy, 1895–1945. Atheneum. ISBN 0-689-11402-8.
- Jentsura, Hansgeorg (1976). Warships of the Imperial Japanese Navy, 1869–1945. US Naval Institute Press. ISBN 0-87021-893-X.
- Watts, A.J. (1966). Japanese warships of World War II. Ian Allan. ISBN 0711002150.
- Whitley, M. J. (1988). Destroyers of World War 2. Cassell Publishing. ISBN 1-85409-521-8.
