= Japanese destroyer Kawakaze (1936) =

Destroyer of the Imperial Japanese Navy

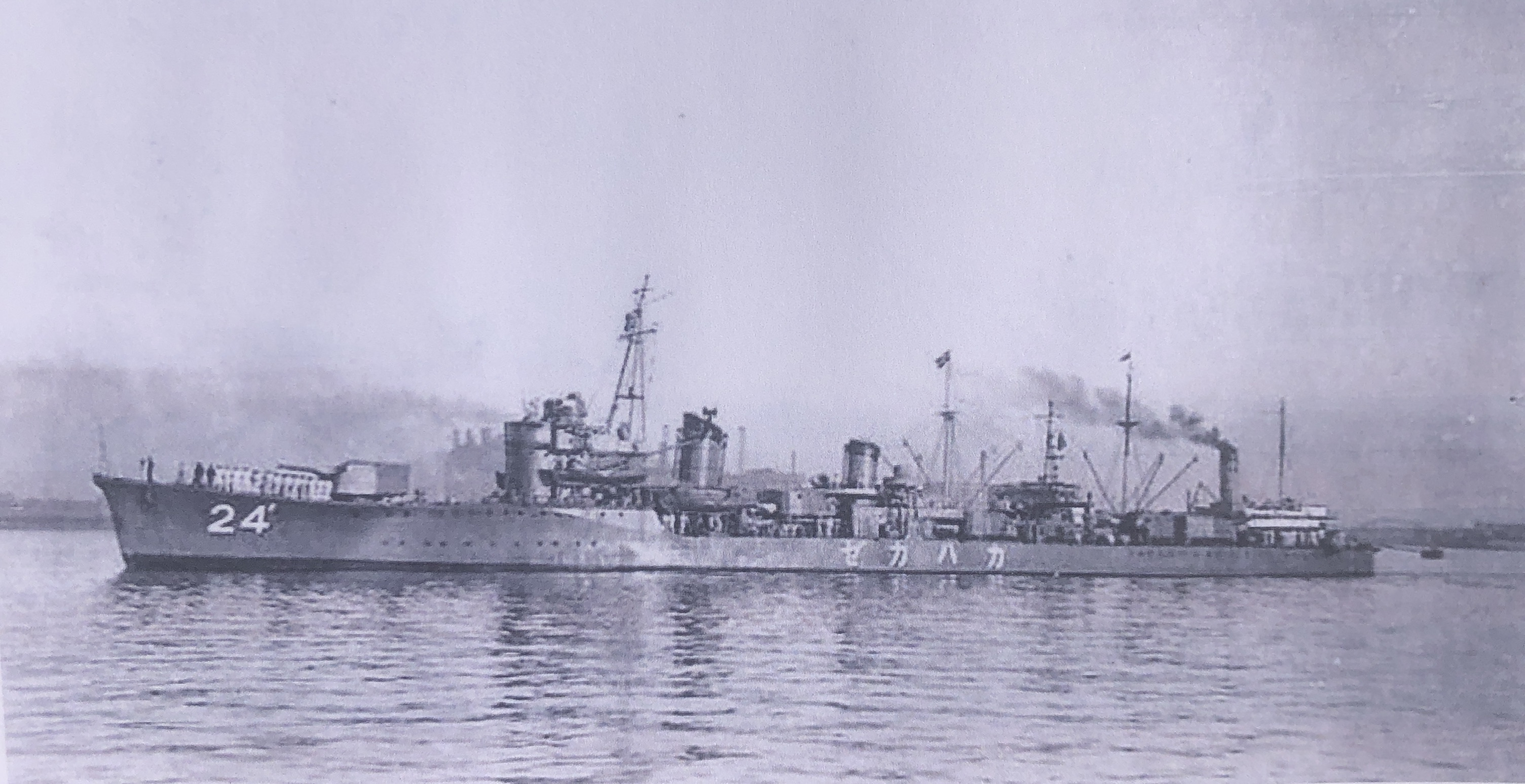
- Kawakaze upon commissioning, April 30, 1937

History

Empire of Japan
- Name: Kawakaze
- Namesake: River Wind
- Ordered: 1933 FY
- Builder: Fujinagata Shipyards
- Laid down: 25 April 1935
- Launched: 1 November 1936
- Commissioned: 30 April 1937
- Stricken: 15 October 1943
- Fate: Sunk 7 August 1943

General characteristics
- Class & type: Shiratsuyu-class destroyer
- Displacement: 1,685 long tons (1,712 t)
- Length: 103.5 m (340 ft) pp; 107.5 m (352 ft 8 in) waterline
- Beam: 9.9 m (32 ft 6 in)
- Draft: 3.5 m (11 ft 6 in)
- Propulsion: 2 shaft Kampon geared turbines; 3 boilers, 42,000 hp (31,000 kW)
- Speed: 34 knots (39 mph; 63 km/h)
- Range: 4,000 nmi (7,400 km) at 18 kn (33 km/h)
- Complement: 226
- Armament: 5 × 12.7 cm/50 Type 3 naval guns (2×2, 1×1); 2 × Type 93 13 mm AA guns; 8 × 24 in (610 mm) torpedo tubes; 16 × Depth charges

Service record
- Operations: Battle of Tarakan (1942); Battle of the Java Sea (1942); Battle of Midway (1942); Battle of the Eastern Solomons (1942); Battle of the Santa Cruz Islands (1942); First Naval Battle of Guadalcanal (1942); Battle of Tassafaronga (1942); Battle of Vella Gulf (1943)

Kawakaze (江風, ”River Wind”) was the ninth of ten Shiratsuyu-class destroyers, and the third to be built for the Imperial Japanese Navy under the Circle Two Program (Maru Ni Keikaku). Completed in April of 1937, Kawakaze took part in the battle of the Java Sea, where she assisted in sinking the destroyer HMS Encounter and escorted carriers at the battles of the Eastern Solomons and Santa Cruz. During the Guadalcanal campaign, Kawakaze torpedoed and sank the destroyer USS Blue and after bombarding Henderson Field she took part in the battle of Tassafaronga, where she probably torpedoed and sank the heavy cruiser USS Northampton.

On Patrol duty off Guadalcanal, Kawakaze helped to sink the torpedo boat PT-44, then took part in the evacuation of Guadalcanal, during which she sank the torpedo boats PT-37 and PT-111. After a large variety of escorting and transport missions, Kawakaze was sunk by a torpedo attack from US destroyers at the battle of Vella Gulf, August 7, 1943.

== History ==
The Shiratsuyu-class destroyers were modified versions of the Hatsuharu class, and were designed to accompany the Japanese main striking force and to conduct both day and night torpedo attacks against the United States Navy as it advanced across the Pacific Ocean, according to Japanese naval strategic projections. The Shiratsuyu class had the same originally planned main armament of the Hatsuharu class destroyers, five 12.7 cm (5 in)/50 guns in two twin turrets, one forward and one aft, and one aft single turret. Alongside this, their torpedo battery was improved to eight 61 cm (24 in) torpedo tubes in two quadrupole mounts, each equipped with a reload and firing type 93 torpedoes. They also had an improved speed of 34 knots.

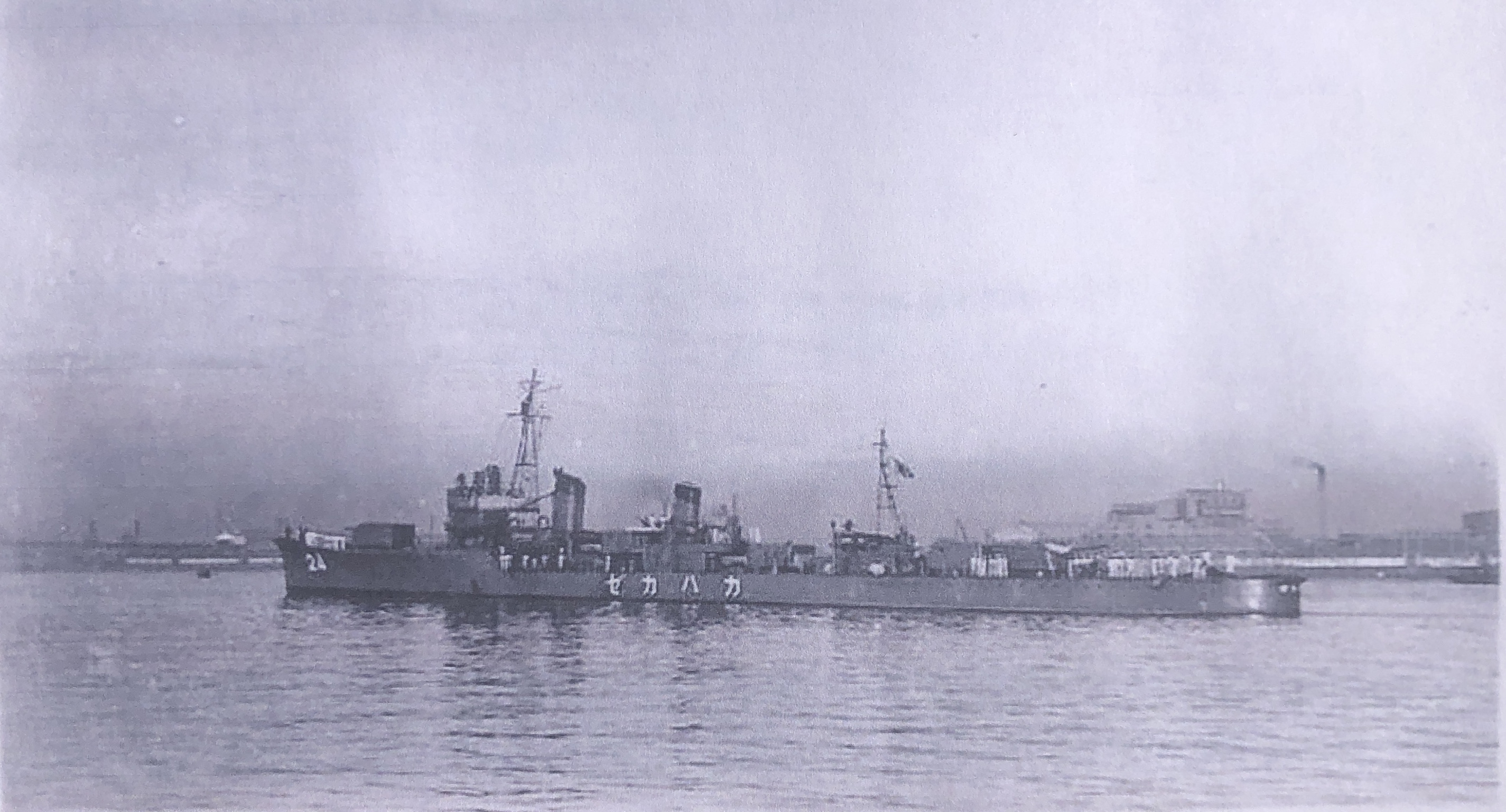
Another angle of Kawakaze upon commissioning

Kawakaze, built at the Fujinagata Shipyards was laid down on 25 April 1935, launched on 1 November 1936 and commissioned on 30 April 1937. As with the last 4 Shiratsuyu class destroyers, she was slightly different from the first 6 built, with a more rounded and smooth bridge which was used as a prototype for the succeeding Asashio class destroyers, as opposed to the previous blocky and angular bridge. Upon commissioning, Lieutenant Commander Wakabayashi Kazuo was appointed to command Kawakaze, and she was assigned to destroyer division 24 alongside her sister ships Umikaze, Yamakaze, and Suzukaze. In August of 1937 to December, Kawakaze joined destroyer division 24 in taking part in the Second Sino-Japanese War (specifically the Battle of Shanghai) taking part in a variety of convoy escorting and patrol duties, with the occasional shore bombardment mission. On October 11, 1941, Kawakaze was one of 98 Japanese warships anchored in Tokyo Bay for a massive fleet inspection in preparation for Japan's entry into WW2. Emperor Hirohito inspected the fleet personally aboard the battleship Hiei.

== Operational history ==
From November 26 to December 1, Kawakaze steamed with destroyer division 24 to Palau, and on December 6 she departed to escort the Legaspi invasion convoy. The next day, the Japanese aircraft carriers of the Kido Butai attacked Pearl Harbor and brought the Japanese into WW2, with Kawakaze completing her mission on the 12th. From the rest of December and into January and February of 1942, Kawakaze undertook escorting missions for the Lamon Bay, Tarakan, Balikpapan, and Makassar invasion forces. During her escorting of the Balikpapan invasion force, Kawakaze was attacked by Dutch aircraft, which almost hit her, but through excellent maneuverability she managed to escape damage, though the Dutch planes did sink the troop ship Nana Maru. The skirmish became part of the overall battle of Balikpapan.

On February 27, Kawakaze was escorting the invasion convoy destined to Java when the force was ordered to intercept an Allied cruiser group in what became battle of the Java Sea. However, Kawakaze only took part in a mass torpedo attack that failed to score any hits, with the heavy cruisers Haguro and Nachi primarily carrying the battle into a devastating Japanese victory.

On March 1 Kawakaze joined other destroyers and the heavy cruisers Haguro, Nachi, Myōkō, and Ashigara, and in the late night engaged a trio of Allied ships attempting to escape the Java Sea. The heavy cruiser HMS Exeter was crippled by a 203 mm (8 in) shell from Haguro which cut her speed to 5 knots, and was escorted by the destroyers HMS Encounter and USS Pope. After gunfire from the cruisers disabled Exeter's remaining boilers, electrical power, and guns and lit her aflame, leading to being scuttled, Kawakaze and her sistership Yamakaze together engaged Encounter, hitting her with shells that disabled her steering and rudder. Myōkō and Ashigara joined into the beating, and together the four ships sank Encounter. Myōkō and Ashigara later caught Pope, crippled by bombs from the light carrier Ryūjō, and finished her off with gunfire. Kawakaze after the battle rescued 35 survivors from Exeter.

In April, Kawakaze assisted in the invasion of Panay and Negros in the Philippines. On the 15th, Lieutenant Commander Kazuo was promoted to a commander, and from April 28 to May 1, Kawakaze steamed to Sasebo, where she was drydocked for maintenance. From 10 May, Kawakaze was reassigned to the IJN 1st Fleet and returned to Sasebo Naval Arsenal for repairs at the end of the month. During the Battle of Midway on 4–6 June, Kawakaze was part of the Aleutians Guard Force. On 14 July she was assigned back to the IJN 2nd Fleet and returned to Truk in mid-August together with the aircraft carrier Chitose.

=== Sinking of USS Blue ===
From August 21–23, Kawakaze engaged in patrol duties off Guadalcanal, alternating with the destroyer Kagerō. However, it was in the darkness of the early morning of the 22nd that Kawakaze was fulfilling such duties, when she happened to stumble into firing range of a trio of American destroyers, USS Henley, USS Helm. and most crucially USS Blue which were also on patrol duty. Blue detected Kawakaze on her radar but was unable to identify her as an enemy ship. This blunder allowed Kawakaze to close to 2,925 meters (3,200 yards) away from the enemy ships and fire a full spread of eight torpedoes. One of these torpedoes smashed into Blue's stern, destroying her engine and steering, killing 9 men, and injuring 21 others. Kawakaze withdrew from the area and evaded damage, while Henley attempted to tow Blue, but two days later it became clear Kawakaze's torpedo had fatally damaged her, resulting in Blue's scuttling.

After sinking Blue and finishing up patrol duties, Kawakaze joined the destroyers Kagerō, Isokaze, Mutsuki, and Yayoi with the purposes of bombarding Henderson Field, a former Japanese airbase which was captured by US forces. On the 24th, they successfully completed their mission and shelled the airfield, allowed for a number of Japanese troops to land on Guadalcanal.

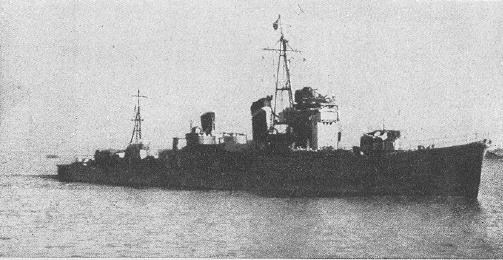
Kawakaze at anchor

On 24 August, Kawakaze was part of the escort for Japanese troop ships at the Battle of the Eastern Solomons. In the remainder of August through early November, Kawakaze participated in ten "Tokyo Express" high speed transport runs or surface attack missions to Guadalcanal, alongside serving as an aircraft carrier escort during Battle of the Santa Cruz Islands on 26 October under Admiral Nobutake Kondō. During the First Naval Battle of Guadalcanal on the night of 12–13 November 1942, Kawakaze rescued 550 survivors from the torpedoed transport ship Brisbane Maru. For the rest of the month, Kawakaze patrolled between Shortland Island, Buna and Rabaul.

=== Battle of Tassafaronga ===
On November 29th, Kawakaze left the Shortlands as part of a six destroyer flotilla on a supply transport mission, loaded to the brim with supply drums that were to be tossed off the ship to float to Japanese soldiers near the Lunga point off Guadalcanal, so much so that the spare torpedoes were taken off the ship to make room for supply drums, leaving Kawakaze with only the eight torpedoes loaded in the tubes. A protection force escorted the supply line consisting of Admiral Tanaka's flagship, the destroyer Naganami, and the destroyer Takanami. However, US codebreakers discovered their plan, and embarked a task force of four heavy cruisers, one light cruiser, and six destroyers to intercept them

The American ships intercepted the Japanese destroyers in the night of the 30th and opened fire. Kawakaze, the second to last ship in the formation, watched as the heavy cruisers USS New Orleans and USS Minneapolis and the light cruiser USS Honolulu blasted Takanami, sinking her with some 50 shell hits, but not before Takanami fired her torpedo battery, which ended up hitting both New Orleans and Minneapolis, shearing off both ship's bows. With two of the five US cruisers out of the fight, the other destroyers swerved to engage, avoiding US destroyer torpedoes. Kawakaze was the third ship to fire torpedoes, coming after Oyashio and Kuroshio and shortly before Naganami, unleashing a spread of eight type 93 torpedoes at the enemy vessels. The crews of the Japanese ships cheered on as a torpedo from Oyashio crippled the heavy cruiser USS Pensacola, flooding her engine room and disabling three of her four 8-inch (203 mm) gun turrets, knocking a third cruiser out of the fight, followed closely by Honolulu disengaging from the battle to evade torpedo spreads.

==== Sinking of USS Northampton ====
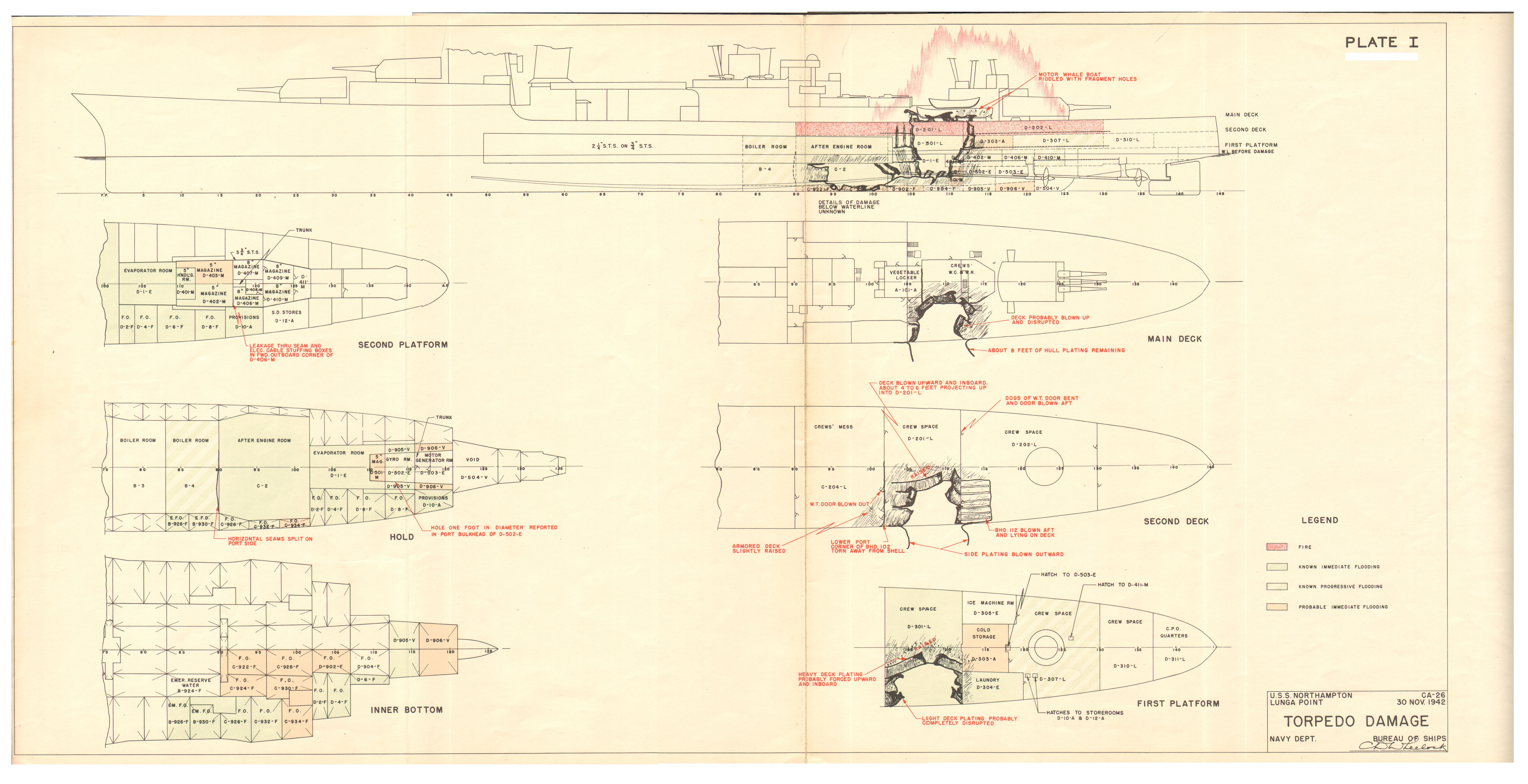
A drawing of the damage inflicted on Northampton by Kawakaze

However, Kawakaze scored the biggest success of the battle. About 10 minutes after Pensacola was hit, Kawakaze is generally credited for landing the two torpedoes that gouged the heavy cruiser USS Northampton. Unlike Honolulu, which ended up the only US cruiser without damage, Northampton continued to sail in a straight line to engage the enemy, firing off several salvos without obtaining a hit until Kawakaze's torpedoes made their mark right next to each other on the port side on the ship's back half, one hitting and destroying engine room, and the other hitting right behind her turret 3. The damage detonated her fuel tanks, flooded three of her four propellers and left the cruiser dead in the water, and started a gigantic fire inside the ship. Northampton immediately listed at 10 degrees, and as flooding and fires quickly overwhelmed damage control, the list increased more and more until the abandon ship order was issued. Over a period of two hours and sixteen minutes, Northampton sank by the stern, taking 50 men with her. Kawakaze was not damaged during the battle.

In December and through the end of January 1943, Kawakaze continued in transport operations to Guadalcanal and to Kolombangara. On the 12th of December, Kawakaze in conjunction with gunfire her sistership Suzukaze sank the torpedo boat PT-44. Kawakaze then shifted to troop evacuation missions from Guadalcanal from February. On the 1st of February 1943, while taking part in Operation Ke, off Guadalcanal, Kawakaze sank the motor torpedo boats PT-37 and PT-111.

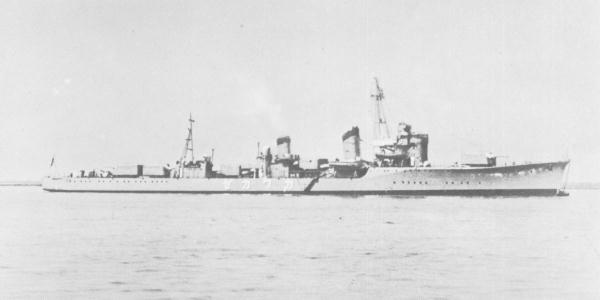
Kawakaze at anchor in 1937

On 9 February, she suffered significant damage in a collision with cargo ship Toun Maru and had to be towed by the destroyer Kuroshio to Rabaul for emergency repairs before returning to Sasebo by the end of March for further repairs which were completed by the end of May, Kawakaze returned to Truk, transported troops to Nauru in early June, and to Kwajalein in late June and Tuluvu on 1 August.

=== Battle of Vella Gulf ===
On 7 August 1943, Kawakaze was on a troop transport run to Kolombangara. In the Battle of Vella Gulf she was sunk by gunfire and torpedoes of the American destroyers USS Dunlap, Craven and Maury, between Kolombangara and Vella Lavella at position 07°50′S 156°54′E. Of her crew, 169 were killed.

She was removed from the navy list on 15 October 1943.
