= Warabi (disambiguation) =

Warabi is a city in Japan.

Warabi may also refer to:

- Monjon, a species of rock-wallaby also called warabi
- Bracken, a genus of ferns known in Japan as warabi
  - Warabimochi, a Japanese jelly-like confection made from warabi
- Japanese destroyer Warabi, a 1920s destroyer of the Imperial Japanese Navy
