= Japanese cruiser Jintsū =

Naval light cruiser (1925–1943)

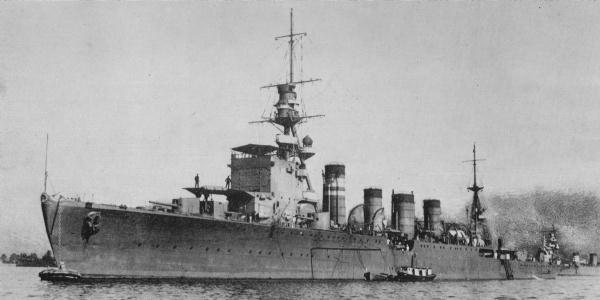
- Japanese light cruiser Jintsū, 1925

History

Empire of Japan
- Name: Jintsū
- Namesake: Jinzū River
- Ordered: 1920 Fiscal Year
- Builder: Kawasaki Shipyards, Kobe, Japan
- Laid down: 4 August 1922
- Launched: 8 December 1923
- Commissioned: 31 July 1925
- Stricken: 10 September 1943
- Fate: Sunk 13 July 1943 Battle of Kolombangara, Solomon Islands

General characteristics
- Class & type: Sendai-class cruiser
- Displacement: 5195 tons (standard)
- Length: 162.8 m (534 ft 1 in)
- Beam: 14.2 m (46 ft 7 in)
- Draught: 3.9 m (12 ft 10 in)
- Propulsion: 4 shaft Parsons geared turbines; 10 Kampon boilers; 90,000 shp (67,000 kW)
- Speed: 35.3 knots (65.4 km/h)
- Range: 5,000 nmi (9,300 km) at 14 knots (26 km/h)
- Complement: 452
- Armament: (Initial); 7 × 14 cm/50 3rd Year Type naval guns; 2 × 8 cm/40 3rd Year Type naval gun s; 8 × 610 mm (24 in) torpedo tubes (4x2); 48 naval mines; (Final)7 × 14 cm/50 3rd Year Type naval guns; 2 × triple, 2x twin Type 96 25 mm AA guns; 2 × Type 93 13.2 mm machine guns; 8 × 610 mm (24 in) torpedo tubes (4x2)
- Armor: Belt: 64 mm (2.5 in); Deck: 20 mm (0.79 in)
- Aircraft carried: 1 x floatplane
- Aviation facilities: 1x aircraft catapult

Jintsū (神通) was the second vessel completed in the three-ship Sendai-class light cruiser in the Imperial Japanese Navy (IJN), named after the Jinzū River in the Gifu and Toyama prefectures of central Japan. She was active in World War II in various campaigns including the Japanese invasion of the Philippines, the Battle of the Java Sea, and Battle of Midway. On 13 July 1943 in the Battle of Kolombangara, she was discovered during a night attack by American ships and sunk in combat.

== Background ==
The Sendai-class vessels were part of the Eight-eight fleet program, with the first four of eight planned vessels authorized in 1921. However, due to the Washington Naval Treaty, the final four vessels were never authorized, and the fourth vessel was cancelled during construction, as the Japanese Navy decided to concentrate on heavy cruiser procurement instead. Jintsū, as with other vessels of her class, was intended for use as the flagship of a destroyer flotilla.

== Design ==
The Sendai-class vessels were a development of the preceding 5500 ton Nagara-class cruiser, retaining basically the same hull design, engines and main weaponry. However, their boilers were better located, and they had four funnels instead of three, and could attain 35 knots (65 km/h; 40 mph). Sendai and Jintsū could be identified by their raked bow; Naka was completed later, and had a flared bow similar to heavy cruiser designs then under construction. After the August 1927 Mihonoseki Incident, where Jintsū rammed and sank the destroyer Warabi, Jintsū replaced her original bow with a 'yacht' bow identical to Naka.

Each ship was designed with a flying-off platform and hangar over the bow, but did not actually carry aircraft until modified to install a conventional aircraft catapult system was installed in 1929. This was later removed, and moved to the rear deck between 1934 and 1937.

The armament of the Sendai class consisted of seven 14 cm/50 3rd Year Type naval guns, in which the operating teams were protected by shields, two open 8 cm/40 3rd Year Type naval guns and two Type 93 13.2 mm anti-aircraft machine guns. As completed, the torpedo armament consisted of four twin Type 8 torpedo tubes (two mounts and four tubes per side) with sixteen torpedoes (eight in the tubes and eight reloads). These were capable of launching the Type 8 and later Type 90 torpedoes. As part of a series of upgrades to Destroyer Squadron flagships, from March to May 1941 Jintsū replaced her four Type 8 torpedo tubes with two Type 92 quadruple mounts (one per side), allowing the ship to operate the new Type 93 oxygen torpedo in addition to the older types. RV Petrel's footage from 26 April 2019 confirmed these launchers on the wreck.

The armor protection was limited to a belt armor of 6 cm (2.4 in) and a steel deck armor of 3 cm (1.2 in) steel.

== Service career ==
=== Early career ===
Jintsū was laid down on 4 August 1922, launched on 8 December 1923 and completed at Kawasaki Shipyards in Kobe on 21 July 1925. During a night training exercise off of Jizosaki Lighthouse in Shimane Prefecture on 24 August 1927, she inadvertently rammed and sank the destroyer Warabi at night, and had to be taken to Maizuru Naval Arsenal for major repairs, during which time her raked bow was replaced by a flared bow. Her commander, Captain Keiji Mizushiro, subsequently committed suicide over the accident. Jintsū was transferred to Kure Naval Arsenal for further repairs on 5 September.

In 1928, Jintsū was assigned to cover landings of Japanese troops in Shandong province during the Jinan incident, and was later based out of Qingdao. From 1929 to 1937, Jintsū was assigned to patrols of the China coast and subsequently provided cover and support for the landings of Japanese forces in China from 1937 onwards after the start of the Second Sino-Japanese War. She was commanded by Captain Raizō Tanaka from 1 December 1938 to 15 December 1938.

=== Early stages of the Pacific War ===
On 26 November 1941, Jintsū became the flagship of Rear Admiral Raizō Tanaka and DesRon 2 under the Philippine Seizure Force, Southern Force, of the Japanese Third Fleet. At the time of the attack on Pearl Harbor, Jintsū was based out of Palau and engaged in the invasion of the Mindanao, escorting transports with the IJA 16th Infantry Division and Kure No. 1 Special Naval Landing Force (SNLF) from forward bases in Palau to Davao, Legaspi and Jolo. After the Philippines was in Japanese hands by the end of December, Jintsū was reassigned to Rear Admiral Kyūji Kubo's Eastern Netherlands East Indies Seizure Force with DesDiv 15 and DesDiv 16.

=== Battle of the Java Sea ===
On 9 January 1942, Jintsū departed Davao for the invasion of the Celebes, escorting transports holding the Sasebo No. 1 Combined Special Naval Landing Force (SNLF). On 17 January, a Kawanishi E7K2 "Alf" reconnaissance floatplane launched from Jintsū shot down a Dutch Lockheed Hudson light bomber near Menado, but was shot down itself before it could return. In early February, Jintsū was assigned to the invasion force for Ambon, followed by both Dutch and Portuguese Timor and eastern Java. On 20 February, while off Alor Island, she unsuccessfully attacked the American submarine USS Pickerel.

During the Battle of the Java Sea on 27 February 1942, Jintsū and her destroyer groups (including DesDiv 7's Ushio, Sazanami, Yamakaze and Kawakaze and DesDiv 16's Yukikaze, Tokitsukaze, Amatsukaze and Hatsukaze) along with the cruisers Nachi, Haguro, and Naka and the destroyer Inazuma, engaged Dutch Rear Admiral Karel W. F. M. Doorman's Strike Force, with the light cruiser HNLMS De Ruyter, cruisers HMS Exeter, USS Houston, light cruisers HMAS Perth, HNLMS Java, destroyers HMS Electra, HMS Encounter, HMS Jupiter, HNLMS Kortenaer, HNLMS Witte de With and old destroyers USS Alden, USS John D. Edwards, USS John D. Ford and USS Paul Jones

Floatplanes launched from Jintsū, Naka and Nachi marked Doorman's ships' positions and to target Japanese gunnery. At 1727, Jintsū launched eight Type 93 "Long Lance" torpedoes at Doorman's force. These were followed by torpedoes from DesRon 2's destroyers. In all, 72 torpedoes were launched, but incredibly, not one hit a target, and the Allied fleet was later destroyed by other surface units. Jintsū was credited with assisting in the sinking of Electra.

Jintsū returned to Japan in March for refit and repairs. While at Kure, the Doolittle Raid bombed the Japanese home islands. Jintsū was one of the many vessels sent in an unsuccessful pursuit of the American carrier force

In May, after a month of training in the Seto Inland Sea, Jintsū was sent to Saipan where she joined the Midway Invasion Force, escorting transports and oilers. During the Battle of Midway on 3 June 1942, the convoy was bombed by nine Boeing B-17 Flying Fortresses. Later, the convoy was attacked by torpedo-carrying Consolidated PBY Catalina amphibious patrol planes. One oiler was hit during these attacks, but Jintsū returned to Truk, and via Guam to Japan unscathed

In July, in a reorganization of the Imperial Japanese Navy, Jintsū was reassigned to the newly formed Japanese 8th Fleet under the overall command of Vice Admiral Gunichi Mikawa. After American forces invaded Guadalcanal in August, Jintsū was sent via Truk to the Solomon Islands.

=== Solomon Islands campaigns ===
On 16 August 1942, Jintsū departed Truk commanding a major reinforcement for Guadalcanal. On 20 August, the troops were landed, but the lightly armed Japanese failed to storm Guadalcanal's Henderson Field. Rear Admiral Tanaka received a signal from Vice Admiral Nishizō Tsukahara's 11th Air Fleet HQ to turn his convoy about and head north to avoid an American task force. Shortly thereafter, he received another signal from Vice Admiral Mikawa's Eighth Fleet HQ ordering him to change course to 250-degrees WSW. Tanaka, faced with conflicting orders from the senior officer in the area and his own superior, was further frustrated by poor radio reception which prevented him from contacting either headquarters. He compromised and changed course to 320 degrees (WNW), 190 nautical miles (352 km) south of Guadalcanal

Meanwhile, 20 American carrier planes from the aircraft carrier USS Long Island arrived to reinforce the American defenses at Guadalcanal. In response, Admiral Isoroku Yamamoto ordered Vice Admiral Chūichi Nagumo's Third Fleet, with aircraft carriers Shōkaku, Zuikaku, Ryūjō, battleships Hiei, Kirishima, cruisers Kumano, Suzuya, Chikuma, Tone and Nagara and three destroyers to reinforce Admiral Tanaka in Jintsū.

On 23 August, 200 nautical miles (370 km) north of Guadalcanal, Rear Admiral Tanaka's convoy was spotted by a PBY Catalina flying boat. At 0830, Tanaka received a signal from Vice Admiral Gunichi Mikawa's Eighth Fleet headquarters directing him to head north to avoid the American task force. At 1430, Tanaka received a signal from Vice Admiral Tsukahara's 11th Air Fleet headquarters directing him to land troops on Guadalcanal the next day. Tanaka, faced with yet a second set of conflicting orders, replied that he could not comply because some of his ships were too slow

The Battle of the Eastern Solomons occurred over the following two days, 24 August 1942. Jintsū rendezvoused with Ryūjō, which launched two air strikes against Henderson Field. However, Ryūjō herself was hit by aircraft from the aircraft carrier USS Saratoga, with four bombs and a torpedo hit that flooded her starboard engine room, and sank that night.

On 25 August, 150 nautical miles (278 km) north of Guadalcanal, six USMC Douglas SBD Dauntless dive-bombers attacked the Jintsū convoy, sinking one transport and damaging another. A 500-pound (227 kg) bomb hit Jintsū, starting fires and flooding her forward magazines. Twenty-four crewmen were killed and Admiral Tanaka was injured. He shifted his flag to the destroyer Kagerō and Jintsū withdrew to Shortland Island, and from there to Truk, where she underwent emergency repairs by the repair ship Akashi, which lasted for over the next month. In October, she was sent back to Japan, where two Type 96 triple-mount 25 mm AA guns were installed. Repairs were not completed until 8 January 1943.

=== Battle of Kolombangara ===
On 16 January 1943, Jintsū became flagship of DesRon 2 and departed Kure bound for Truk. Jintsū was immediately assigned to the operation to evacuate surviving Japanese army troops from Guadalcanal, which she covered successfully. Through July, Jintsū made several transport runs, escorting forces moving between Truk, Roi and Kwajalein.

On 13 July 1943, Jintsū was in the Battle of Kolombangara. At 0330, Jintsū departed Rabaul as flagship of Rear Admiral Shunji Isaki, with the destroyers Yukikaze, Hamakaze, Yūgure, Mikazuki, Kiyonami and destroyer-transports Satsuki, Minazuki, Yūnagi and Matsukaze with 1,200 troops to reinforce Japanese positions on Kolombangara island, in the Solomon Islands. Soon after arriving into position, Jintsū's radar detected the presence of an Allied fleet before visual contact was made.

The Allied fleet consisted of the cruisers USS Honolulu, USS St. Louis, HMNZS Leander, and the destroyers USS Ralph Talbot, USS Maury, USS Gwin, USS Woodworth and the USS Buchanan, USS Radford, USS Jenkins, USS Nicholas, USS O'Bannon and the USS Taylor.

Admiral Isaki ordered a night torpedo attack, and his ships launched 31 Type 93 "Long Lance" torpedoes, as Jintsū illuminated the Allied fleet with her searchlights. The illumination was fatal, as Jintsū was hit by at least ten radar-directed 6-inch (152 mm) shells from the three Allied cruisers, setting her on fire. The barrage killed both Rear Admiral Isaki and Captain Sato; shortly afterwards a torpedo hit Jintsū starboard in the aft engine room.

As Captain Zenjirō Shimai of Yukikaze assumed command of the Japanese fleet and counterattacked (sinking Gwin, and damaging Leander and St. Louis), Jintsū broke in two and sank at 07°38′S 157°06′E at 2348 hours.

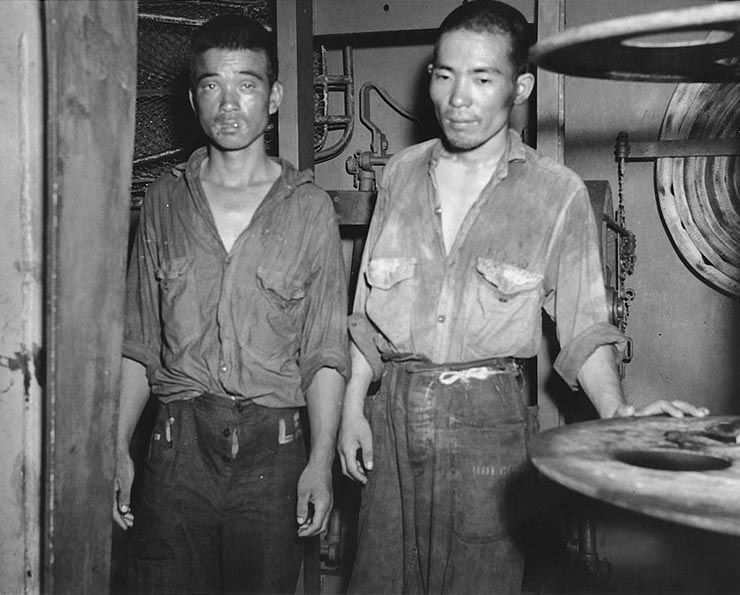
Jintsū survivors aboard USS Nicholas

Later, Japanese submarine I-180 rescued 21 crewmen and a few more were recovered by the Americans, but 482 men were lost. Jintsū was removed from the navy list on 10 September 1943.

== Wreck ==
On 26 April 2019, the crew of RV Petrel announced it had found Jintsu's wreckage near the mouth of Kula Gulf in the Solomon Islands. The cruiser rests in 900 meters (3,000 ft) of water, with her bow section lying on its port side and the stern section upright.
