= USS Honolulu (CL-48) =

Brooklyn-class light cruiser

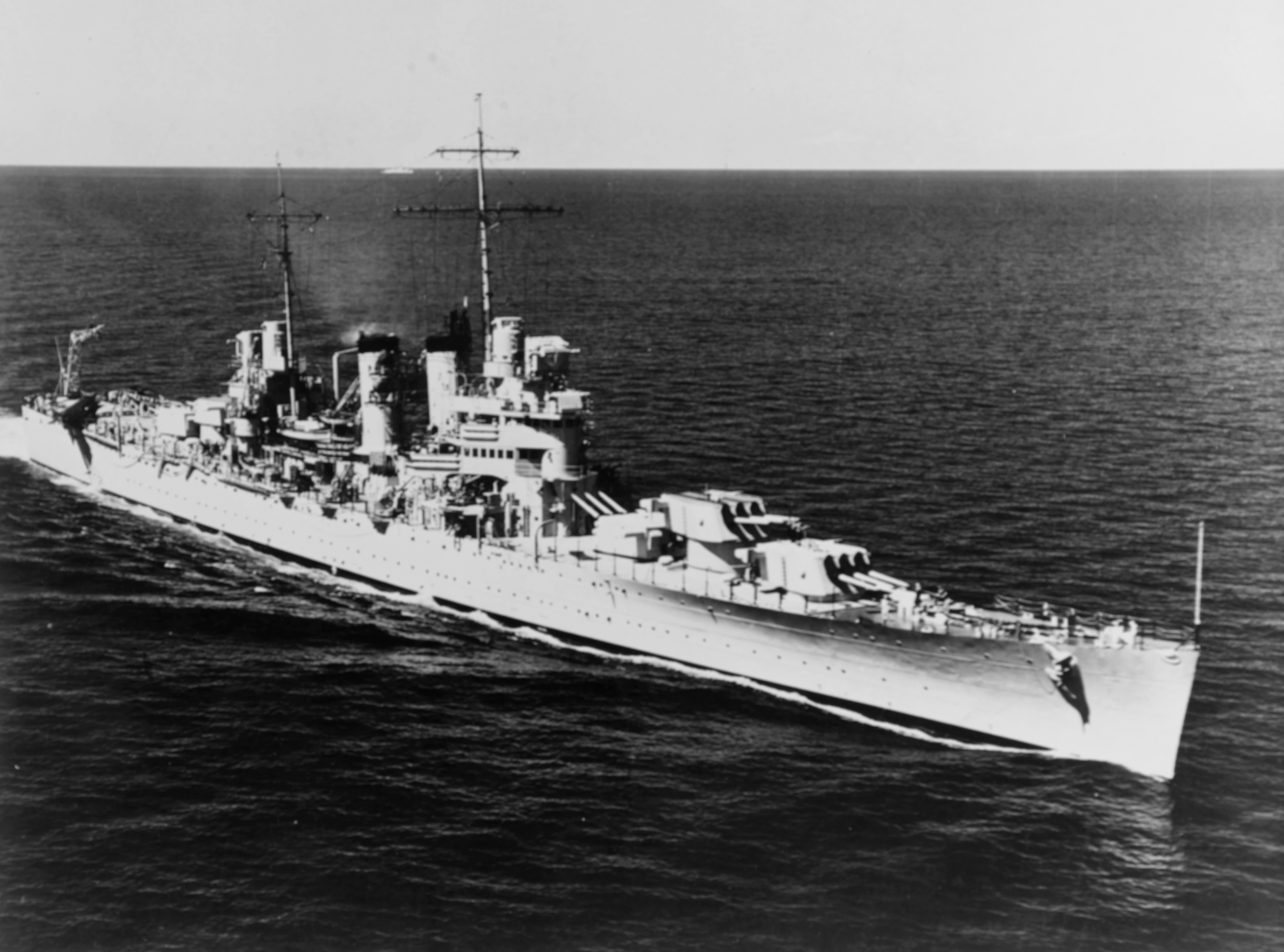
- USS Honolulu (February 1939)

History

United States
- Name: Honolulu
- Namesake: City of Honolulu, Hawaii
- Ordered: 13 February 1929
- Awarded: 22 August 1934 (date assigned to yard); 1 September 1934 (start of construction period)
- Builder: New York Naval Yard, Brooklyn, New York
- Laid down: 9 December 1935
- Launched: 26 August 1937
- Sponsored by: Helen Poindexter
- Commissioned: 15 June 1938
- Decommissioned: 3 February 1947
- Stricken: 1 March 1959
- Identification: Hull symbol:CL-48; Code letters:NEKJ
- Honors and awards: 8 × battle stars
- Fate: Sold as scrap on 12 October 1959

General characteristics (as built)
- Class & type: Brooklyn-class cruiser
- Displacement: 10,000 long tons (10,000 t) (estimated as design); 9,767 long tons (9,924 t) (standard); 12,207 long tons (12,403 t) (max)
- Length: 600 ft (180 m) oa; 608 ft 4 in (185.42 m) lwl
- Beam: 61 ft 7 in (18.77 m)
- Draft: 19 ft 9 in (6.02 m) (mean); 24 ft (7.3 m) (max)
- Installed power: 8 × Steam boilers; 100,000 shp (75,000 kW)
- Propulsion: 4 × geared turbines; 4 × screws
- Speed: 32.5 kn (37.4 mph; 60.2 km/h)
- Complement: 868 officers and enlisted
- Armament: 15 × 6 in (152 mm)/47 caliber guns (5x3); 8 × 5 in (127 mm)/25 caliber anti-aircraft guns (8×1); 8 × caliber 0.50 in (12.7 mm) machine guns
- Armor: Belt: 3 1/4–5 in (83–127 mm); Deck: 2 in (51 mm); Barbettes: 6 in (150 mm); Turrets: 1 1/4–6 in (32–152 mm); Conning tower: 2 1/4–5 in (57–127 mm)
- Aircraft carried: 4 × SOC Seagull floatplanes
- Aviation facilities: 2 × stern catapults

General characteristics (1945)
- Armament: 15 × 6 in/47 caliber guns (5x3); 8 × 5 in/38 caliber dual purpose guns (4x2); 4 × quad 40 mm (1.6 in) Bofors anti-aircraft guns; 2 × twin 40 mm (1.6 in) Bofors anti-aircraft guns; 18 × single 20 mm (0.79 in) Oerlikon anti-aircraft cannons

USS Honolulu (CL-48) of the United States Navy was a Brooklyn-class light cruiser active in the Pacific War (World War II). Honolulu was launched in 1937 and commissioned in 1938. She was the only cruiser to survive the Battle of Tassafaronga undamaged. Honolulu later served in the Battle of Kula Gulf, where she wrecked the destroyer Nagatsuki and helped to sink the destroyer Niizuki, and the Battle of Kolombangara where she helped to sink the light cruiser Jintsū but was crippled by a torpedo which blew off her bow. She then bombarded shores during the Battle of Peleliu. She was taken out of action by serious torpedo damage just before the Battle of Leyte Gulf. She was repaired, but not in time to rejoin the war. She was decommissioned in 1947 and was held in reserve until she was scrapped in 1959.

== Inter-war period ==
The second Navy ship named for the city of Honolulu, Hawaii, she was launched on 26 August 1937 at the New York Navy Yard, sponsored by Helen Poindexter (the daughter of Joseph B. Poindexter, the Governor of Hawaii), and commissioned on 15 June 1938.

After a shakedown cruise to England, Honolulu engaged in fleet problems and exercises in the Caribbean Sea. She steamed from New York on 24 May 1939 to join the Pacific Fleet, arriving at San Pedro, California, on 14 June. For the remainder of the year, she engaged in exercises along the West Coast. During the first half of 1940, Honolulu continued operations out of Long Beach, California, and after an overhaul at the Puget Sound shipyard, she steamed out of Long Beach Naval Shipyard on 5 November for duty from Pearl Harbor. She operated there through 1941.

== World War II ==
On 7 December 1941, Honolulu was moored in the Navy Yard when the Imperial Japanese Navy attacked Pearl Harbor. Honolulu went unscathed in the first wave, but in the second wave was attacked by Japanese dive bombers, but suffered only minor hull damage from a near miss from a 500-pound bomb that exploded under the water and caved in a section of Honolulu's hull, one of three cruisers to take any notable damage through the attack. Damage was quickly patched up in just 5 days.

Following repairs, she sailed on 12 January 1942 to escort a convoy to San Francisco, California, arriving on 21 January. After arriving at the Mare Island shipyards, Honolulu departed for Melbourne Australia on the 31st, arriving at her destination on 26 February, where the ship would guard various Australian ports on patrol duties until the 20 March when she departed back to Pearl Harbor, arriving there a week later. On 8 April, she arrived at San Diego, with the task of escorting a convoy alongside several other US cruisers departing from San Diego to bound for Bora Bora in French Polynesia, leaving on the 13th and arriving on the 28th, and after some guard duties departed back to Pearl Harbor on 19 May.

With the Japanese pushing north towards Alaska, Honolulu departed on 29 May to strengthen forces in that area. After two months of continuous operations out of Kodiak, Alaska, she proceeded to Kiska in the Aleutian Islands on 7 August, to begin bombardment of the island. On 21 August, she screened the first American landings in the Aleutians at Adak Island. After shipyard work at the Mare Island Naval Shipyard, Honolulu departed from San Francisco on 3 November 1942, escorting a convoy to Nouméa in the South Pacific. Later that month, Honolulu sailed from Espiritu Santo in the New Hebrides Islands to intercept a Japanese Navy convoy attempting to reinforce their positions on Guadalcanal in the Solomon Islands.

=== Battle of Tassafaronga ===
Throughout the Guadalcanal campaign, the US suffered major losses in cruisers, with ten cruisers either sunk or taken out of action due to battle damage. Honolulu served in what was essentially the last of America's active cruisers operating in Guadalcanal. Rear Admiral Wright made his flagship the heavy cruiser USS Minneapolis, and alongside Honolulu he commanded the heavy cruisers USS New Orleans, USS Pensacola, and USS Northampton. The force was escorted by six destroyers. The squadron was formed on 24 November.

On the 29th, American code breakers intercepted a message about a Japanese supply run. Admiral Tanaka commanded a total of eight destroyers delivering much needed supplies to Japanese troops on Guadalcanal. With Wright's force having a nearly equal number of destroyers, and the Japanese having no cruisers enroute, Wright saw an easy victory and took his ships to intercept and destroy the enemy ships. However, the Japanese had a trick up their sleeve, the type 93 "long lance" torpedoes, which were larger and more powerful, and most importantly had a longer range than any other widely used torpedo of the war, with a maximum range of 44,200 yards and a designed effective range of 24,000 yards. This was unknown to the allies.

Because of this, on the night of 30 November, Honolulu and the other ships intercepted Tanaka's destroyers and opened fire within 12,000 yards, well within the long lance's effective range. Honolulu, along with Minneapolis and New Orleans, engaged the Takanami at 23:21, which was immediately hit by shells that disabled her steering gear. Takanami fired a full spread of 8 torpedoes right before another salvo of hits blasted both her torpedo mounts clean of before disabling the destroyer and setting her ablaze while she fruitlessly fired her 5-inch (127 mm) guns until they too were disabled. After being hit in excess of 50 times by 8-inch (203 mm) and 6-inch (152 mm) shells, Takanami was blasted into a floating wreck and drifted for over 15 minutes before suddenly detonating and sinking with the loss of 197 men.

However, two of the torpedoes fired by Takanami before she sank hit Minneapolis at 23:27 and another hit New Orleans a minute later, blowing both of their bows clean off and taking both heavy cruisers out of action. Honolulu continued to charge on, but her crew realized that the other destroyers fired another torpedo spread when a torpedo from the Kawakaze hit Pensacola, disabling her engine and three of her four 8-inch (203 mm) gun turrets. Quick thinking by Rear Admiral Tisdale ordered Honolulu to take a hard turn to starboard, barely avoiding a torpedo in the process, allowing Honolulu to avoid any damage. Northampton failed to do the same and continued to engage the Japanese ships which sent her in the same direction as the Kagerō and Makinami which had split off from the main formation. The two destroyers dumped their torpedoes at an enemy cruiser, and Northampton was hit by two torpedoes in the stern at 23:48 and sank over 3 hours with the loss of 50 crew.

Having been the only cruiser of the battle to survive completely undamaged, Honolulu retreated from Guadalcanal, arriving at Espiritu Santo on 2 December, and remained there for the rest of the month. On 2 January 1942, Honolulu joined with several other allied cruisers on patrol duty, and on the 5th the force came under air attacks, where Honolulu was lightly damaged by three bomb near misses. Throughout the rest of January and into February, Honolulu took part in a series of patrol duties, then on 7 March she covered minelayers in the Blackett Strait, before taking part in even more patrol duties. On 11 May, Honolulu departed Espiritu Santo, and on the 13th she bombarded Japanese shore positions in the Kula Gulf.

=== Battle of Kula Gulf ===
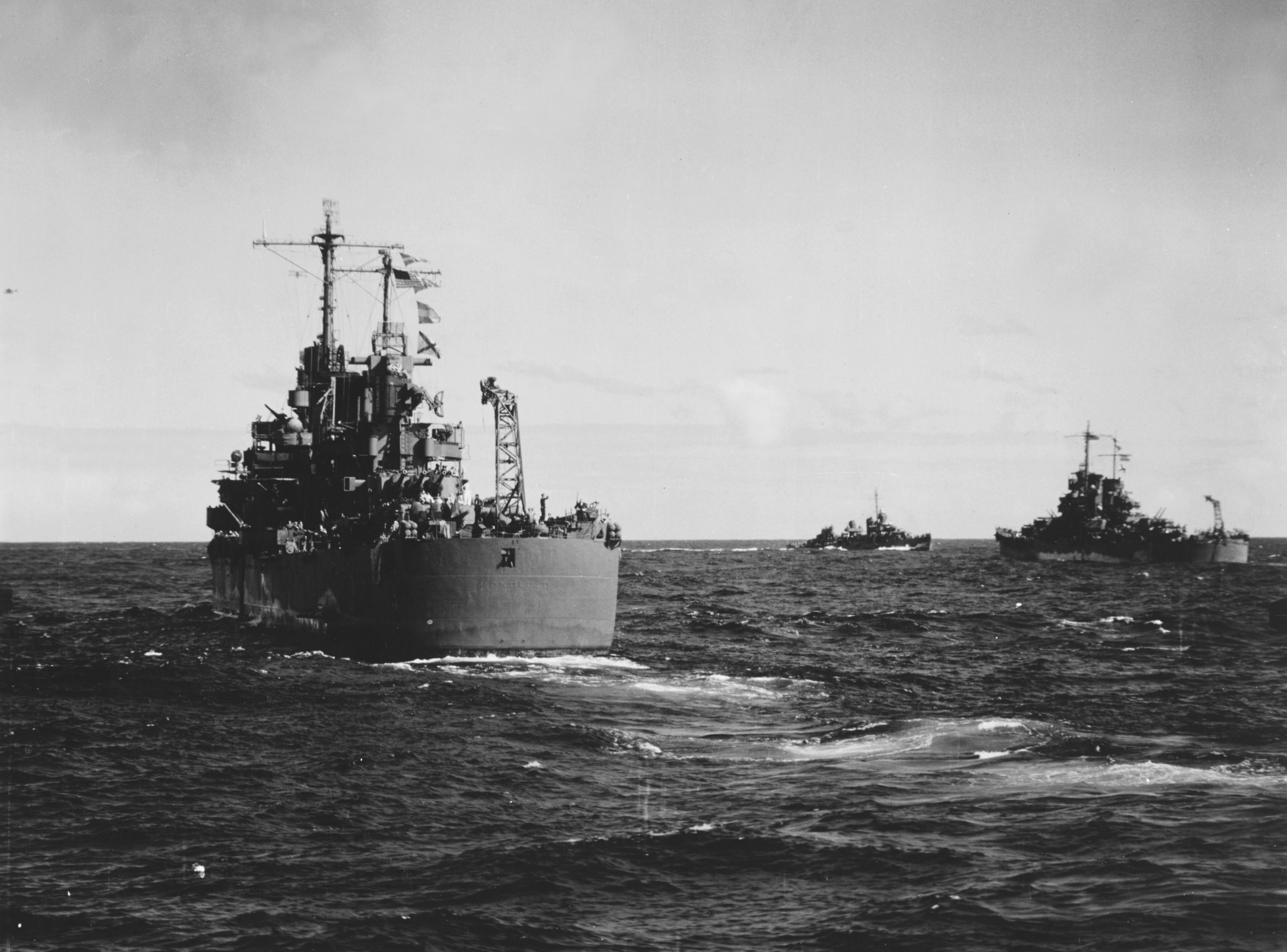
Honolulu retires towards Tulagi after the Battle of Kula Gulf

On 4 July, Honolulu, along with the light cruisers USS Helena and USS Saint Louis and four destroyers, departed the Soloman Islands on patrol duty. On the 5th, a Japanese torpedo hit and sank the destroyer USS Strong. This was believed to be from an enemy submarine, but this torpedo was actually launched from the destroyer Niizuki at a distance of 19,000-22,000 yards, one of the longest ranged torpedo hits in history (alongside the heavy cruiser Haguro torpedoing and sinking the destroyer Kortenaer at a similar distance). However, the presence of US ships did force the Japanese destroyer transports carrying 1,300 infantry troops to retreat.

Later that night, the Niizuki, joined by the destroyers Suzukaze and Tanikaze departed as a protection force for seven other destroyers transporting 2,400 ground troops in a second attempt to run infantry to Kula Gulf. Honolulu and the other American ships prepared to intercept and either destroy or send back this force. By 2:00, Honolulu picked up three Japanese ships on her radar, it was Niizuki, Suzukaze, and Tanikaze closing the range to attack the force with torpedoes. Honolulu, Saint Louis, and Helena all opened fire, all targeting Niizuki. A barrage of 6-inch (152 mm) and 5-inch (127 mm) shell hits quickly reduced Niizuki into a burning hulk and sank her with no survivors. However, Helena quickly expended her smokeless propellants, and the resulting gun flashes caused Suzukaze and Tanikaze to quickly fire their torpedoes and evacuate the area. One of these torpedoes first blew of Helena's bow in a potential magazine explosion. Two minutes later, two more torpedoes destroyed her engines and boilers and broke her keel. Within a few minutes, Helena capsized and sank.

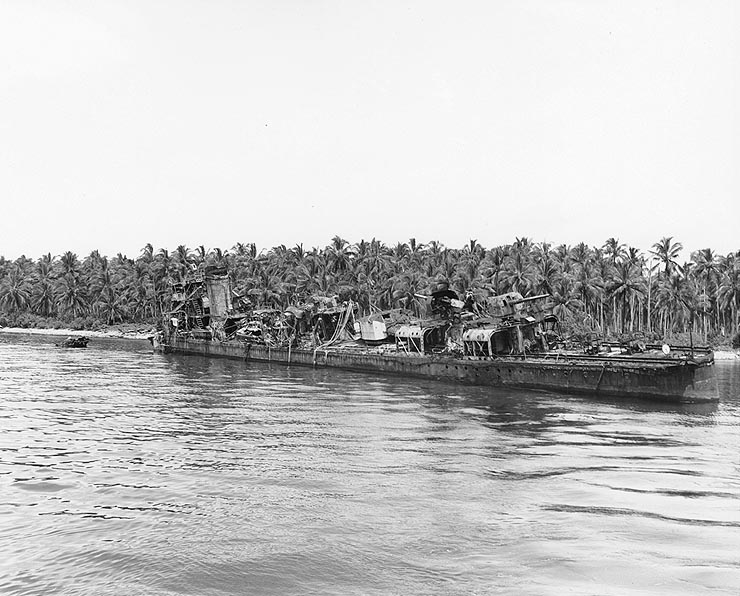
Nagatsuki wrecked after gunfire damage from Honolulu

Honolulu continued to fire at the Japanese ships. One of Honolulu's 6-inch (152 mm) shells hit the destroyer Nagatsuki below the waterline, wrecking her engine room and damaging her so badly she was forced to run aground. Nagatsuki was unable to be refloated, and deemed a complete wreck and abandoned. Further shelling by both Honolulu and Saint Louis hit the destroyer Hatsuyuki six times which damaged her steering and killed six men, but all hits were duds as she withdrew from the battle. However, the Japanese were still able to land 1,600 ground troops, alongside sinking far more tonnage than they lost. After the battle, Honolulu briefly visited Espiritu Santo, before departing on 10 July for additional patrol duties.

=== Battle of Kolombangara ===
On 12 July, Honolulu was still on patrol duties alongside Saint Louis and was now joined by the New Zealand light cruiser HMNZS Leander, which was sent to replace the sunken Helena, alongside 10 destroyers, when allied coastwatchers alerted the ships of a nearby Japanese force. Four Japanese destroyer transports carrying 1,200 ground troops were enroute to Kolombangara, with a protection of a destroyer line consisting of the Yukikaze, Hamakaze, Kiyonami, and Yūgure. Trailing behind these destroyers was the light cruiser Jintsū, the Japanese flagship, supported by the elderly destroyer Mikazuki. The force rapidly sped to engage the Japanese ships, and at 1:03 in the morning of the 13th had located the force, closing to 10,400 yards (9,500 meters) away. Opening up the battle, Jintsū lit up her searchlights and illuminated the allied ships and opened fire, hitting Leander with a 14 cm (5.5 in) shell. However, in turn the US ships opened fire, and all targeted the Japanese cruiser. Honolulu peppered Jintsū with her main guns, and in turn was not hit once as the American gunfire hit Jintsū again and again.

By around 1:20, 6-inch (152 mm) gunfire mostly from Honolulu and Saint Louis blasted Jintsū into a floating wreck, setting her on fire and leaving her dead in the water and without a functional gun. American destroyers closed to point blank range to deliver the final blow, and at least one torpedo probably from USS Taylor finished her off. However, simultaneously a type 93 torpedo probably from Yukikaze hit Leander, forcing her to retire from the battle (she was damaged so badly she could not be repaired in time to take further part in WW2, and never served as a New Zealand warship again, making up for Jintsū's loss). For the next half hour, the American warships swept for the Japanese destroyers, and by 1:50 had spotted the destroyer line. Honolulu opened fire, straddling Yukikaze several times, but scoring no hits, and several minutes later the Japanese destroyers fired their torpedoes again. Two of these torpedoes hit Honolulu. One torpedo hit the stern, but did not explode, but the other blew Honolulu's bow clean off. Moments later, a third torpedo badly damaged Saint Louis, twisting her bow to the port side, while a fourth sank the destroyer USS Gwin.

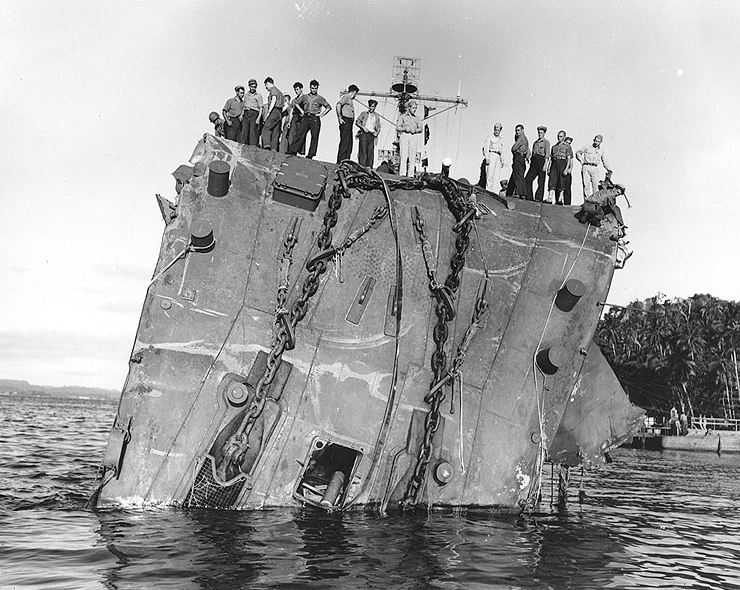
Honolulu's collapsed bow, 20 July 1943, after she was torpedoed at the battle of Kolombangara.

Honolulu was forced to sail in reverse to Tulagi harbor, but managed to make it to repairs. She was patched up with a temporary bow, and further sailed to the repair ship USS Vestal, arriving on 16 July. She remained moored to Vestal until 6 August, where after enough repairs were completed, she sailed for Pearl Harbor, arriving on the 16th where she was drydocked, where repairs lasted until 2 September. Honolulu was taken out of drydock and departed for the Mare Island naval shipyards to be further repaired, arriving four days later.

On 17 November, repairs were finally completed, and Honolulu departed California to continue her role in the struggle against Japan. She arrived at Espiritu Santo on 11 December, and then resumed operations in the Solomons later that month. On 27 December, she engaged in the bombardment of an enemy barge, troop, and supply concentration on Bougainville Island. In the early months of 1944, the cruiser continued bombardments and patrols in the Solomon Islands. She screened the landings on Green Island on 13 February, before retiring from the Solomons to begin preparations for the Saipan and Guam operations in the Mariana Islands.

Honolulu took part in bombardments of the southeastern part of Saipan Island in early June as the Navy and Marines leaped across the Pacific. While bombarding Guam in mid-June, Honolulu was deployed northwest to intercept the Japanese fleet. She returned to Eniwetok Atoll on 28 June for replenishments, before providing support for the invasion of Guam. She remained on station for three weeks, performing great service with her accurate gunfire, before returning to Purvis Bay on Florida Island in the Solomons on 18 August. Honolulu steamed out on 6 September to provide fire support for the landings in the Palau Islands, such as at Peleliu Island and Angaur, remaining in this area during September unopposed by the Japanese fleet. America now had decisive command of the sea, and therefore nearly full freedom of operations.

=== Battle of Leyte ===
Honolulu departed from the staging area at Manus Island in the Admiralty Islands on 12 October, and steamed towards the Philippines for the invasion of Leyte. She began a bombardment from Leyte Gulf on 19 October, and the next day she began screening the landings. At 1600, on 20 October an enemy torpedo plane was sighted as it aimed its torpedo at Honolulu. Despite the skillful maneuvering of Captain Thurber to evade, the torpedo found its mark on her port side. 64 men were killed and 35 were injured.

Honolulu sailed out the next day, arriving at Manus on 29 October for temporary repairs, and then steamed for Norfolk, Virginia, on 19 November, arriving on 20 December via Pearl Harbor, San Diego, California, and the Panama Canal. Honolulu remained at Norfolk for the duration of the war, undergoing repairs and alterations which included the installation of four twin 5in/38 gun mounts, and after a shakedown cruise in October 1945, she steamed to Newport, Rhode Island, for duty as a training ship. Honolulu arrived at Philadelphia on 8 January 1946 and was decommissioned there on 3 February 1947, and joined the Reserve Fleet at Philadelphia. Stricken on 1 March 1959, Honolulu was sold for scrapping to Bethlehem Steel, Baltimore, Maryland, on 12 October 1959. Honolulu was scrapped at Sparrow Point, Maryland, on 19 August 1960.

== Awards ==
- Navy Unit Commendation (three awards)
- Asiatic-Pacific Campaign Medal with eight battle stars
- World War II Victory Medal

Honolulu's three Navy Unit Commendations were for the Battle of Tassafaronga on 30 November 1942; the period from 5 July to 14 July 1943, around the time of the Battle of Kula Gulf and the Battle of Kolombangara; and 12 September to 20 October 1944, around the time of the Battle of Peleliu and Battle of Leyte.

== See also ==
- Captain Robert W. Hayler, commanding officer of Honolulu from August 1942 to March 1944 and a future vice admiral, who received two Navy Crosses during his service aboard Honolulu.
