= Patrol torpedo boat PT-37 =

Torpedo boat of the United States Navy

History

United States
- Name: PT-37
- Builder: Electric Boat Company
- Laid down: 12 April 1941
- Launched: 25 June 1941
- Sponsored by: United States Navy
- Completed: 18 July 1941
- Fate: Sunk by Kawakaze, 1 February 1943

General characteristics
- Class & type: Patrol torpedo boat
- Tonnage: 40 gross register tons
- Length: 77 feet o/a
- Beam: 19 feet 11 inches
- Height: 4 feet 6 inches
- Propulsion: Three 1,500 hp Packard V12 M2500 gasoline engines, three shafts.
- Armament: Two twin .50 caliber Browning M2 machine guns; Two .303 caliber Lewis machine guns; 2 21" torpedo tubes; Four torpedoes

Service record

The PT-37 was an American PT-20 class motor torpedo boat deployed in World War II. It was laid down 12 April 1941 by the Electric Boat Co., Elco Works, Bayonne, NJ, and entered service on 18 July 1941.

On 11–12 December 1942, while patrolling off Guadalcanal, PT-37 and PT-40 attacked the Japanese destroyer Teruzuki (then the flagship of Rear Admiral Raizō Tanaka), successfully hitting her with torpedoes. Depth charges on the ship eventually exploded causing her to sink three hours later.

PT-37 was sunk by gunfire from the Japanese destroyer Kawakaze off Guadalcanal on 1 February 1943.
