= Japanese destroyer Warabi =

Destroyer of the Imperial Japanese Navy

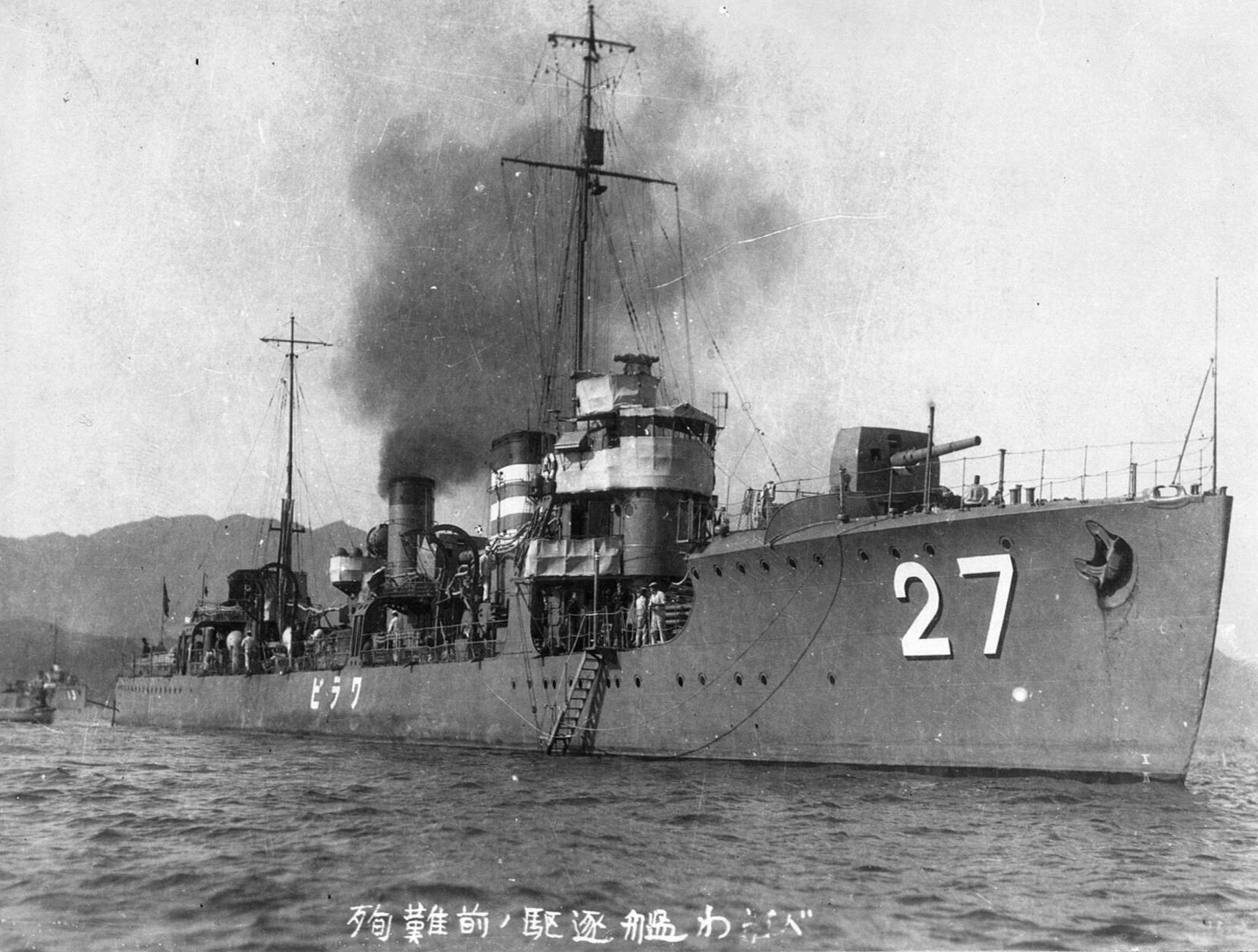
- Warabi in 1927

History

Empire of Japan
- Name: Warabi
- Builder: Fujinagata Shipyards, Osaka, Japan
- Laid down: 12 October 1920
- Launched: 28 September 1921
- Completed: 19 December 1921
- Stricken: 15 September 1927
- Fate: Sunk 24 August 1927 in collision off Miho Bay

General characteristics (as built)
- Type: Momi-class destroyer
- Displacement: 850 long tons (864 t) (normal); 1,020 long tons (1,036 t) (deep load)
- Length: 275 ft (83.8 m) (pp); 280 ft (85.3 m) (o/a)
- Beam: 26 ft (7.9 m)
- Draft: 8 ft (2.4 m)
- Installed power: 3 × Kampon water-tube boilers; 21,500 shp (16,000 kW)
- Propulsion: 2 shafts; 2 × geared steam turbines
- Speed: 36 knots (67 km/h; 41 mph)
- Range: 3,000 nmi (5,600 km; 3,500 mi) at 15 knots (28 km/h; 17 mph)
- Complement: 110
- Armament: 3 × single 12 cm (4.7 in) guns; 2 × twin 533 mm (21 in) torpedo tubes

The Japanese destroyer Warabi (蕨) was one of 21 Momi-class destroyers built for the Imperial Japanese Navy (IJN) in the late 1910s. The ship was sunk on August 24, 1927 in a collision with the cruiser Jintsū off Miho Bay, and was struck from the naval list on September 15, 1927.

== Design and description ==
The Momi class was designed with higher speed and better seakeeping than the preceding Enoki-class second-class destroyers. The ships had an overall length of 280 feet (85.3 m) and were 275 feet (83.8 m) between perpendiculars. They had a beam of 26 feet (7.9 m), and a mean draft of 8 feet (2.4 m). The Momi-class ships displaced 850 long tons (864 t) at standard load and 1,020 long tons (1,036 t) at deep load. Warabi was powered by two Parsons geared steam turbines, each driving one propeller shaft using steam provided by three Kampon water-tube boilers. The turbines were designed to produce 21,500 shaft horsepower (16,000 kW) to give the ships a speed of 36 knots (67 km/h; 41 mph). The ships carried a maximum of 275 long tons (279 t) of fuel oil which gave them a range of 3,000 nautical miles (5,600 km; 3,500 mi) at 15 knots (28 km/h; 17 mph). Their crew consisted of 110 officers and crewmen.

The main armament of the Momi-class ships consisted of three 12-centimeter (4.7 in) Type 3 guns in single mounts; one gun forward of the well deck, one between the two funnels, and the last gun atop the aft superstructure. The guns were numbered '1' to '3' from front to rear. The ships carried two above-water twin sets of 533-millimeter (21 in) torpedo tubes; one mount was in the well deck between the forward superstructure and the bow gun and the other between the aft funnel and aft superstructure.

== Construction and career ==
Warabi, built at the Fujinagata Shipyards in Osaka, was laid down on October 12, 1920, launched on September 28, 1921 and completed on December 19, 1921. The ship was sunk on August 24, 1927 in a collision with the cruiser Jintsū off Miho Bay, and was struck from the naval list on September 15, 1927. In the collision and sinking, 119 people died.

== Wreck ==
In September 2020 researchers discovered what they concluded is the forward section of Warabi 33 kilometres (21 mi; 18 nmi) to the northeast of the Mihonoseki Lighthouse, Shimane Prefecture, noting that the ship had broken in two in the collision,. The aft part was located in July 2021, 10 kilometres (6.2 mi; 5.4 nmi) north of the bow.
