= Raizō Tanaka =

Japanese admiral

- 田中 頼三
- Born: 27 April 1892; Yamaguchi Prefecture, Japan
- Died: 9 July 1969 (aged 77)
- Military career
- Allegiance: Empire of Japan
- Branch: Imperial Japanese Navy
- Service years: 1913–1946
- Rank: Vice Admiral
- Nickname: "Tenacious Tanaka"
- Commands: Tachikaze; Ushio; Jintsū; Mako Guard District; Kongō; 2nd Destroyer Squadron, Reinforcements Force
- Conflicts: World War II; Pacific War; Battle of the Java Sea; Battle of Midway; Guadalcanal campaign; Battle of the Eastern Solomons; Battle of Tassafaronga
- Awards: Order of the Rising Sun (4th class); Order of the Sacred Treasures (2nd class)

Raizō Tanaka (田中 頼三, Tanaka Raizō; 27 April 1892 – 9 July 1969) was a rear admiral in the Imperial Japanese Navy (IJN) during most of World War II. A specialist in the heavy torpedoes that were carried by all the destroyers and cruisers of the IJN, Tanaka mainly commanded destroyer squadrons, with a cruiser or two attached, and he was the primary leader of the "Tokyo Express" reinforcement and resupply shipments during the long campaign for the island of Guadalcanal in the Solomon Islands of the South Pacific Ocean. From the Americans, Tanaka acquired the nickname of "Tenacious Tanaka" for his stalwart opposition.

== Early career ==
Tanaka was born in what is now part of Yamaguchi city, in Yamaguchi Prefecture. After high school, Tanaka entered the Imperial Japanese Naval Academy, where he was a member of the 41st graduating class in 1913, ranked 34th out of 118 midshipmen to graduate.

As a midshipman, Tanaka served on the cruisers Azuma and Nisshin, battleship Aki. After promotion to sub-lieutenant, he served on the cruiser Kasagi and battlecruiser Kongō.

He then attended the basic torpedo and naval artillery schools from December 1916 to December 1917, after which he was assigned to the destroyers Hatsushimo and Kusunoki, and the battleship Katori. He returned to torpedo school, attending the advanced course from December 1919 to December 1920. From 1921 to November 1923, Lieutenant Tanaka was assigned as the executive officer on the submarine tender Karasaki, the cruiser Iwate, the destroyer Shiokaze, and the cruiser Yura. In December 1925, Tanaka was appointed as executive officer as well as an instructor at the IJN's torpedo school. After one year at the school, he performed two years of staff duties, including one year at Kure Naval District, one of the IJN's primary bases.

In 1930, Lieutenant commander Tanaka commanded the destroyer Tachikaze and in 1931—after his promotion to commander—commanded the destroyer Ushio. From December 1932 to December 1936, he worked on the staff for the Yokosuka Naval District.

From 1 December 1937 to 15 December 1938, Captain Tanaka commanded the light cruiser Jintsū. He next served as the Chief of Staff of the Mako Guard District from 15 December 1938 to 15 November 1939. Subsequently, he commanded the reconstructed fast battleship Kongō from November 1939 to November 1940.

== World War II ==
On 26 September 1941, Captain Tanaka took command of the 2nd Destroyer Squadron with his flagship being the light cruiser Jintsū once again. Tanaka was promoted to the rank of rear admiral on 15 October of the same year. The 2nd Destroyer Squadron, under Tanaka, and initially composed of eight destroyers in addition to the light cruiser Jintsū, participated in the invasion of the Philippines and of the Dutch East Indies, including the Battle of the Java Sea, during the early months of the Pacific War between Japan and Allied forces.

On 21 May 1942, Tanaka's 2nd Destroyer Squadron—consisting of Jintsū and 10 destroyers—sortied from Kure to support the Japanese attack on Midway Island by escorting the transports carrying the troops for the prospective invasion (which was never carried out, because of the American air supremacy there). After the Japanese defeat in the Battle of Midway, Tanaka's ships returned to Japan via the island of Guam.

After the U.S. Marine Corps landing by the American 1st Marine Division on the island of Guadalcanal on 7 August 1942, Tanaka with the 2nd Destroyer Squadron departed from Japan immediately to steam to the main Japanese Central Pacific base at Truk Atoll. The 2nd Destroyer Squadron departed from Truk on 16 August, escorting a convoy carrying the troops to counterattack the American Marines forces on Guadalcanal. On 25 August, during the Battle of the Eastern Solomons, Tanaka's ships were attacked by Marine Corps warplanes from Henderson Field on Guadalcanal. One transport ship and one destroyer were sunk by the Marine aviators and Jintsū was bombed and heavily damaged, with Tanaka being wounded. Due to the damage to Jintsū, Tanaka shifted his flag to the destroyer Kagerō.

Stationing his squadron at the IJN base in the Shortland Islands, over the next several months Tanaka organized reinforcement and resupply efforts to Japanese soldiers fighting in the battle for Guadalcanal. Due to the threat of air attacks by the Marines, Tanaka ordered the use of his fast destroyers to deliver men and supplies to Guadalcanal at night. This was because his destroyers could make the trip to Guadalcanal and back to the northern Solomons in a single night, reducing the vulnerability of ships to American air attacks. The Japanese called these supply runs "Rat Transportation" and the Americans called them the "Tokyo Express".

On 30 November 1942, late in the Guadalcanal campaign, Tanaka personally led a "Tokyo Express" run to Guadalcanal. Tanaka's force included eight destroyers which Tanaka led from his flagship Naganami. That night, an American force of five cruisers and four destroyers, commanded by Carleton H. Wright, prepared to intercept Tanaka's ships in Ironbottom Sound near Guadalcanal. Using radar, the American ships sank one Japanese destroyer with gunfire. Tanaka, however, quickly responded by issuing orders for his ships to maneuver, fire torpedoes, and vacate the area. The Japanese "Long Lance" torpedoes hit four of Wright's cruisers as Tanaka's ships retreated back up The Slot towards the Shortlands. One of the American cruisers was sunk, and a further three were damaged.

On 12 December 1942 on another "Tokyo Express" run, Tanaka's destroyer, Teruzuki, was hit and sunk by torpedoes fired from U.S. Navy PT boats PT-37 and PT-40 near Guadalcanal and Tanaka was wounded. Tanaka had fallen into disfavor with the IJN High Command, hence on 29 December 1942, Tanaka was transferred to Singapore. In 1943, he was reassigned to shore duty in faraway Burma, and he remained on shore duty for the remainder of the war. Nevertheless, Tanaka was promoted to the rank of vice admiral on 15 October 1944.

== Postwar ==
Tanaka retired from the navy on 26 June 1946 and died on 9 July 1969 at 77 years of age.
