= Japanese destroyer Teruzuki (1941) =

Akizuki-class destroyer

Coordinates: 9°13′S 159°46′E

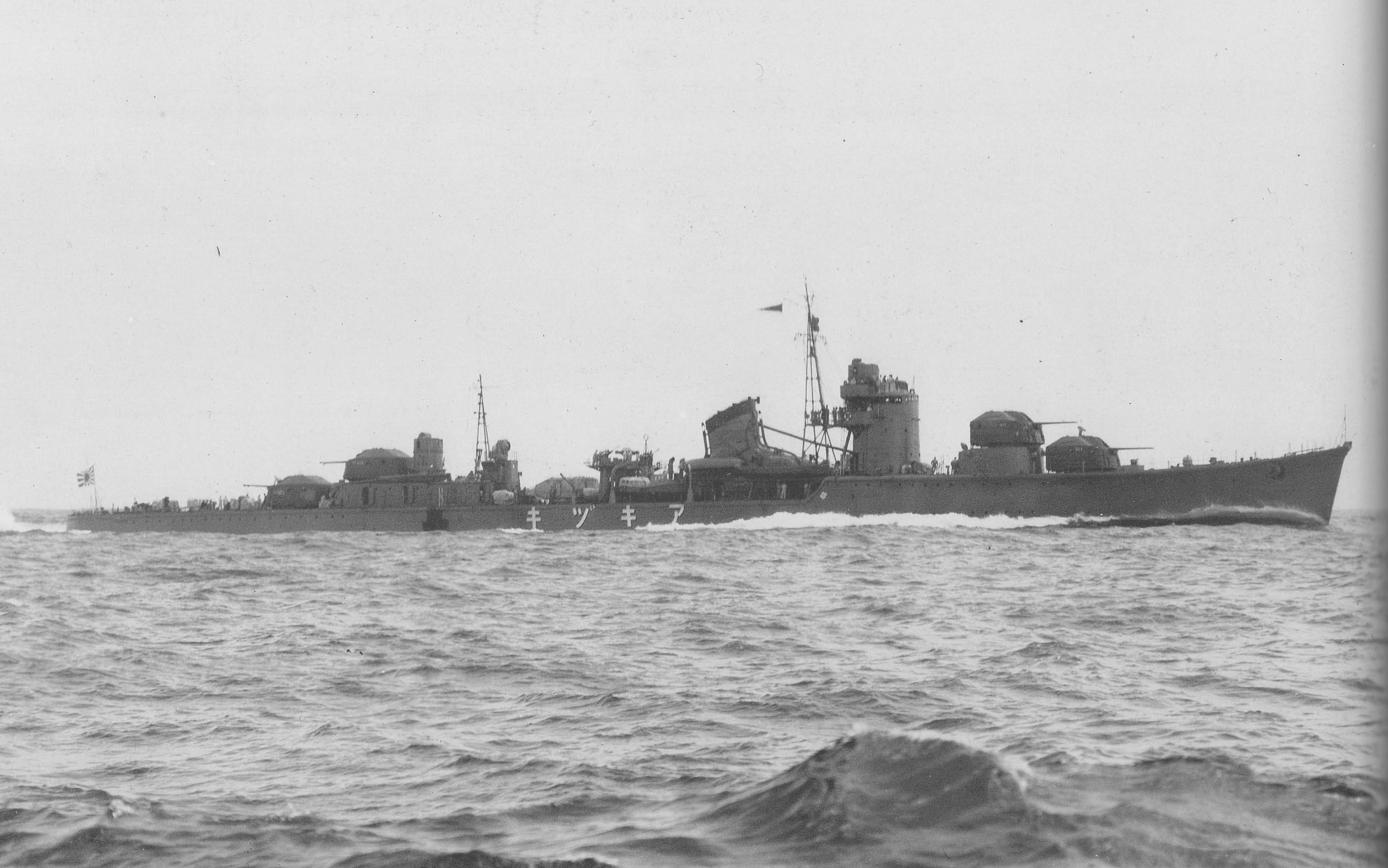
- Sister ship Akizuki in May 1942

History

Empire of Japan
- Name: Teruzuki
- Builder: Mitsubishi, Nagasaki
- Launched: 21 November 1941
- Completed: 31 August 1942
- Stricken: 15 January 1943
- Fate: Sunk in action, 12 December 1942

General characteristics
- Class & type: Akizuki-class destroyer
- Displacement: 2,701 long tons (2,744 t) (standard)
- Length: 134.2 m (440 ft 3 in)
- Beam: 11.6 m (38 ft 1 in)
- Draft: 4.15 m (13 ft 7 in)
- Installed power: 3 × water-tube boilers; 52,000 shp (38,776 kW)
- Propulsion: 2 × shafts; 2 × geared steam turbines
- Speed: 33 knots (61 km/h; 38 mph)
- Range: 8,300 nmi (15,400 km; 9,600 mi) at 18 knots (33 km/h; 21 mph)
- Complement: 300
- Armament: 4 × twin 100 mm (3.9 in) DP guns; 2 × twin 25 mm (1 in) AA guns; 1 × quadruple 610 mm (24 in) torpedo tubes; 2 × depth charge throwers; 54 × depth charges

Teruzuki (照月; "Shining Moon" or "Illuminated Moon") was the second of 13 Akizuki-class destroyers built for the Imperial Japanese Navy (IJN) during the 1940s. The Akizuki-class ships were given a heavy armament of eight dual-purpose guns to fulfill their designed role as aircraft carrier escorts, although the design was modified with additional weapons to improve their flexibility. Completed in mid-1942, Teruzuki played a minor role in the Battle of the Santa Cruz Islands in October. The following month she participated in the Naval Battle of Guadalcanal, crippling several American warships, without taking any damage herself. The ship was sunk in December by American patrol torpedo boats as she escorted a convoy delivering supplies to the Japanese troops on Guadalcanal.

== Design and description ==
The Akizuki-class ships were originally designed as anti-aircraft escorts for carrier battle groups, but were modified with torpedo tubes and depth charges to meet the need for more general-purpose destroyers. The ships measured 134.2 meters (440 ft 3 in) overall, with beams of 11.6 meters (38 ft 1 in) and drafts of 4.15 meters (13 ft 7 in). They displaced 2,701 long tons (2,744 t) at standard load and 3,420 long tons (3,470 t) at deep load. Their crews numbered 300 officers and enlisted men.

Each ship had two Kampon geared steam turbines, each driving one propeller shaft using steam provided by three Kampon water-tube boilers. The turbines were rated at a total of 52,000 shaft horsepower (38,776 kW) for a designed speed of 33 knots (61 km/h; 38 mph). The ships carried enough fuel oil to give them ranges of 8,300 nautical miles (15,400 km; 9,600 mi) at speeds of 18 knots (33 km/h; 21 mph).

The main armament of the Akizuki class consisted of eight 100-millimeter (3.9 in) Type 98 dual-purpose guns in four twin-gun turrets, two superfiring pairs fore and aft of the superstructure. They each carried four 25-millimeter (1 in) Type 96 anti-aircraft (AA) guns in two twin-gun mounts. The ships were also each armed with four 610-millimeter (24 in) torpedo tubes in a single quadruple rotating mount amidships for Type 93 (Long Lance) torpedoes; one reload was carried for each tube. The first batch of ships were each equipped with two depth charge throwers for which 54 depth charges were carried.

== Construction and career ==
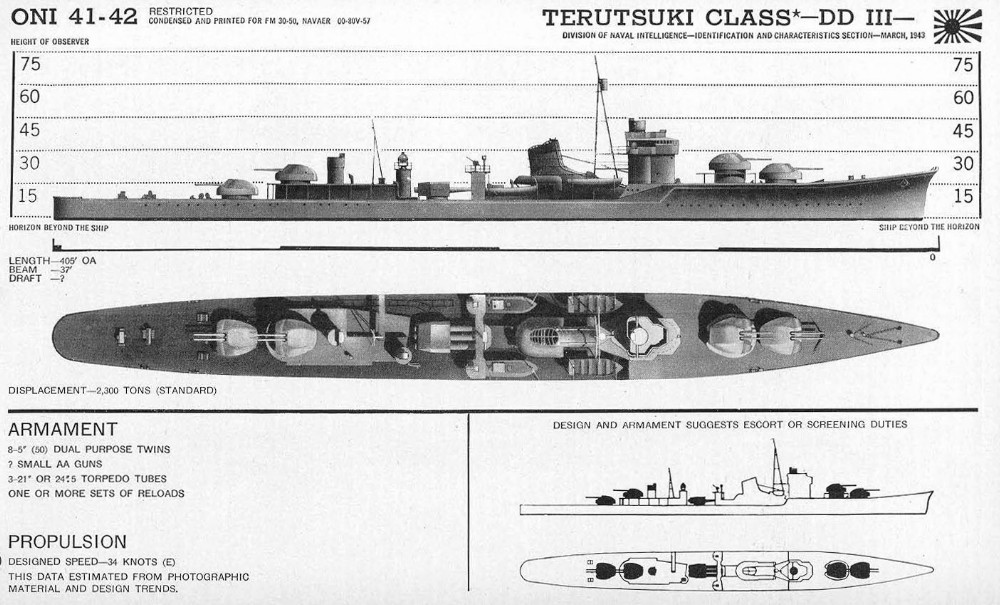
US Office of Naval Intelligence recognition drawings of the Akizuki class made during World War II

One of the first batch of Akizuki-class destroyers authorized in the 1939 4th Naval Armaments Supplement Program, Teruzuki was laid down on 13 November 1940 at the Mitsubishi shipyard in Nagasaki and launched on 21 November 1941. Completed on 31 August 1942, the ship spent the next month working up and was assigned to Destroyer Squadron 10 of the Third Fleet on 7 October. Later that month, she steamed to Truk and then joined her squadron, escorting the three aircraft carriers of the Third Fleet as they maneuvered in support of the Imperial Japanese Army's offensive on Guadalcanal Island.

During the Battle of the Santa Cruz Islands on 26–27 October, Teruzuki was near-missed by one Douglas SBD Dauntless dive bomber on the first day of the battle. That night, the destroyer was attacked by a Consolidated PBY Catalina maritime patrol aircraft. Although the 500-pound (230 kg) bomb missed, it detonated close enough to slightly damage the ship and kill seven crewmen. She returned to Truk for repairs. Destroyer Squadron 10 departed Truk on 9 November to rendezvous with Vice Admiral Hiroaki Abe's Vanguard Force. Abe was tasked with bombarding Henderson Field on Guadalcanal on the night of 12-13 November as part of an effort to neutralize the American aircraft that disrupted Japanese attempts to reinforce and resupply their troops on Guadalcanal. Admiral Isoroku Yamamoto, commander in chief of the Combined Fleet, believed that Abe's ships would lure the American ships into a night battle in the waters off Guadalcanal, something which the IJN was far more experienced in than the United States Navy.

=== Naval Battle of Guadalcanal ===
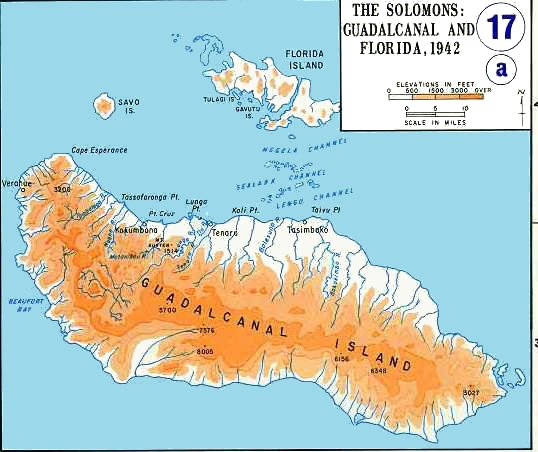
Guadalcanal, Florida and Savo Islands

As the Vanguard Force approached Guadalcanal, its formation was badly disrupted by a heavy rainstorm that severely limited visibility, which caused the ships to lose track of one another and negated a floatplane's attempt to scout for American ships near Lunga Point on Guadalcanal. American radar spotted the advancing Japanese ships at a range of 27,100 yards (24,800 m), but communication difficulties impeded the American response until Rear Admiral Daniel Callaghan ordered a course change directly for the Japanese ships. Other course changes followed in rapid succession and caused confusion among the American commanders as the two formations began to intermingle. While the Americans were in a line-ahead formation, the Japanese were scattered in small groups. Teruzuki was the trailing ship of the northern column of destroyers and played no role in the initial stages of the battle as the battleships Hiei and Kirishima blocked her view of the American ships. As the American ships got deeper into the Japanese formation, Teruzuki engaged the light cruiser USS Atlanta and the destroyers Cushing and Sterett, with unknown effects before losing track of them. About half an hour later, she spotted Sterett again and crippled her with hits that disabled her fire-control director and two aft five-inch (127 mm) mounts, while starting leaks in the forward fire room. Shortly afterwards Teruzuki was part of a group of ships that sank the destroyers Laffey and Monssen; a torpedo from either Teruzuki or the destroyer Asagumo blew off Laffey's stern. The following morning Teruzuki arrived with three other destroyers to escort the crippled Hiei to safety. Abe rejected a proposal by the Combined Fleet staff to use the ship to counter the battleship's jammed rudder because he wanted Teruzuki free to maneuver to counter the aerial attacks that had already begun. After repeated failures to further damage the Hiei, American torpedo bombers were finally able to hit her twice more that afternoon and forced her crew to abandon ship and scuttle her.

On 14 November, she was assigned to the Emergency Bombardment Force, commanded by Vice Admiral Kondō Nobutake, which was tasked to finish the job that Abe's ships had not been able to complete two days earlier. That night, as the Japanese ships approached Guadalcanal, Kondō divided his forces into three sections, with most of his lighter forces deployed to sweep east of Savo Island in search of American ships, under the command of rear admirals Kimura Susumu and Hashimoto Shintarō, while he retained control of the Bombardment Force that consisted of Kirishima, the heavy cruisers Atago, Takao, and their escorts, Asagumo and Teruzuki. Hashimoto's ships were in the lead and spotted the Americans (erroneously identified as four destroyers and two cruisers) north of Savo Island at 23:10. When he reported that the American ships were southeast of Savo and had turned west, Kondō ordered Kimura, trailing behind Hashimoto's ships, to sweep west of Savo and attempt to pincer the Americans between his ships and Hashimoto's. Kondō also turned his own ships away to buy time for his other ships to deal with the Americans before he began his bombardment of Henderson Field.

The Americans had spotted Kondō's approaching ships earlier in the day and Rear Admiral Willis Lee's force of two battleships, Washington and South Dakota and four destroyers, was dispatched to prevent any bombardment of Henderson Field. Washington's radar picked up a Japanese ship shortly after midnight and a lookout confirmed the spotting shortly afterwards. The battleships opened fire at 00:17 on Hashimoto's lead ship, but failed to make any hits before the Japanese ships laid a smoke screen and the American radars lost contact. Shortly afterwards Kimura's ships attacked the American destroyers, sinking two and crippling the others, but the battleships, trailing behind their destroyers, played no part in this part of the battle as Washington could not distinguish between American and Japanese ships and South Dakota's radar was only working intermittently.

Kimura's ships withdrew to reload their torpedoes and Kondō turned the Bombardment Force towards Lunga Point with his pair of destroyers in the lead at 00:54, believing that Kimura's and Hashimoto's ships had sunk or crippled all of the American ships. Shortly afterwards, Japanese lookouts aboard Kimura's ships identified the American battleships sailing north of Cape Esperance. Atago spotted South Dakota's superstructure and fired eight torpedoes at 00:59. The battleship's radar began working again and located Kondō's ships only 5,800 yards (5,300 m) away a minute later. South Dakota's main gunnery director was still malfunctioning and her main armament was ineffective. Kirishima and Washington dueled, with dire effects on the former, while the rest of the Bombardment Force, including Teruzuki, focused on South Dakota. None of the torpedoes fired at the American battleships hit, but the hail of gunfire that riddled South Dakota's superstructure knocked out most of the battleship's secondary gunnery directors, radars, and radio antennas while starting multiple small fires. Rendered combat ineffective, the battleship withdrew at 01:10. About 20 minutes later, Washington turned south to avoid torpedo attacks. Kondō ordered Teruzuki and Asagumo to pursue the battleship, but they were unable to catch up.

At 02:04 Kondō ordered a general withdrawal, but the pursuing destroyers were tasked with finding Kirishima. They found the crippled battleship at 02:43, but she was beyond saving, listing to starboard with her rudders jammed out of position, and the steering-control room flooded. They attempted to tow the battleship, but they could not overcome the resistance of the rudders. Kirishima's crew counter-flooded empty compartments on the port side in an unsuccessful attempt to alleviate the list. After the order to abandon ships was given, Teruzuki tied up on the port side of the ship to take off the crew while Asagumo did the same on the starboard side. With some 300 men still on board, the battleship lurched over to her port side and started to sink by the stern. Teruzuki was barely able to back away in time to avoid being crushed when Kirishima capsized at 03:23. Teruzuki and Asagumo, joined by the destroyer Samidare, were able to rescue 1,128 sailors before departing the area at 04:30.

=== Subsequent activities ===
Teruzuki returned to Truk on 18 November and briefly became the flagship of Kimura's Destroyer Squadron 10. She was slightly damaged when she struck a reef at Truk on 3 December. This was quickly repaired as the ship departed for the naval base in the Shortland Islands two days later. Upon her arrival on 7 December, Teruzuki became the flagship of Rear Admiral Raizō Tanaka, commander of Destroyer Squadron 2. By this time the Japanese were forced to deliver supplies to its troops on Guadalcanal via water-tight drums that depended on the currents to take them to their destination. On 11 December Tanaka assembled a convoy of five destroyers carrying drums that was escorted by five additional destroyers as well as Teruzuki. Enroute the convoy survived an attack by 14 Dauntless dive bombers without damage and dropped off their drums without further incident. The convoy turned for home at 01:15 with Teruzuki covering their withdrawal, moving at a speed of 12 knots (22 km/h; 14 mph) near Savo Island. Shortly afterwards, the destroyer was attacked by two or three PT boats; (Note: Historians disagree about the identities and numbers of the PT boats involved. Jeffrey Cox states that PT-40, PT-45 and PT-59 were the attackers with PT-45 making the torpedo hit. Cox quotes Richard B. Frank stating that the attack was made by PT-37, PT-40 and PT-48 while Allyn Nevitt identifies PT-37 and PT-40 as the attackers.) Teruzuki was hit by a pair of torpedoes in the stern. The detonation broke the rudder and one propeller shaft, disabling the ship, while rupturing an oil tank that caught on fire. Tanaka was knocked unconscious by the detonation and was transferred to another destroyer at 01:33, as were some of the crew. The fire could not be controlled and caused the aft depth charge magazine to explode at 04:40, sinking the ship. Nine men were killed, but the destroyers Naganami and Arashi rescued 197 crewmen between them. An additional 156 men were able to swim to Guadalcanal. Teruzuki was stricken from the navy list on 15 January 1943.

On 10 July 2025, Robert Ballard's EV Nautilus discovered Teruzuki on the sea floor and conducted the first visual scan since her sinking. Her bow has collapsed to one side, and much of her superstructure has fallen off to one side, the detached stern was located some distance away. The gun turrets remain intact though the forward super-firing turret has sunk down.
