= Japanese destroyer Takanami (1942) =

Yūgumo-class destroyer

- Right elevation and plan of a Yūgumo-class destroyer

History

Empire of Japan
- Name: Takanami
- Builder: Uraga Dock Company
- Laid down: 29 May 1941
- Launched: 16 March 1942
- Completed: 31 August 1942
- Stricken: 24 December 1942
- Fate: Sunk, 30 November 1942

General characteristics
- Class & type: Yūgumo-class destroyer
- Displacement: 2,520 long tons (2,560 t)
- Length: 119.15 m (390 ft 11 in)
- Beam: 10.8 m (35 ft 5 in)
- Draught: 3.75 m (12 ft 4 in)
- Speed: 35 kn (65 km/h; 40 mph)
- Complement: 228
- Armament: 6 × 127 mm (5.0 in)/50 cal dual purpose guns; up to 28 × Type 96 25 mm (0.98 in) anti-aircraft guns; up to 4 × 13.2 mm (0.52 in) anti-aircraft guns; 8 × 610 mm (24 in) torpedo tubes for Type 93 torpedoes; 36 × depth charges

Takanami (高波) was a Yūgumo-class destroyer of the Imperial Japanese Navy. Her name means "Tall Wave".

== Design and description ==
The Yūgumo class was a repeat of the preceding Kagerō class with minor improvements that increased their anti-aircraft capabilities. Their crew numbered 228 officers and enlisted men. The ships measured 119.17 meters (391 ft 0 in) overall, with a beam of 10.8 meters (35 ft 5 in) and a draft of 3.76 meters (12 ft 4 in). They displaced 2,110 metric tons (2,080 long tons) at standard load and 2,560 metric tons (2,520 long tons) at deep load. The ships had two Kampon geared steam turbines, each driving one propeller shaft, using steam provided by three Kampon water-tube boilers. The turbines were rated at a total of 52,000 shaft horsepower (39,000 kW) for a designed speed of 35 knots (65 km/h; 40 mph).

The main armament of the Yūgumo class consisted of six Type 3 127-millimeter (5.0 in) guns in three twin-gun turrets, one superfiring pair aft and one turret forward of the superstructure. The guns were able to elevate up to 75° to increase their ability against aircraft, but their slow rate of fire, slow traversing speed, and the lack of any sort of high-angle fire-control system meant that they were virtually useless as anti-aircraft guns. They were built with four Type 96 25-millimeter (1.0 in) anti-aircraft guns in two twin-gun mounts, but more of these guns were added over the course of the war. The ships were also armed with eight 610-millimeter (24.0 in) torpedo tubes in a two quadruple traversing mounts; one reload was carried for each tube. Their anti-submarine weapons comprised two depth charge throwers for which 36 depth charges were carried.

== Construction and career ==
On the night of October 13–14, she escorted battleships Kongō and Haruna during the bombardment of Henderson Field, Guadalcanal. On the night of October 15–16, she escorted cruisers Myōkō and Maya during the bombardment of Henderson Field. On 30 November 1942, Takanami was on a supply transport run to Guadalcanal, when her task group engaged a United States Navy task group in the Battle of Tassafaronga, where she was sunk by gunfire from the heavy cruisers USS New Orleans and Minneapolis, largely from Minneapolis — several miles south-southwest of Savo Island (9°14′S 159°49′E), with 197 killed; 48 survivors reached Guadalcanal, 19 were later captured by US troops.

However, before she was sunk, Takanami managed to fire off her torpedoes, inflicting devastating damage on the very ships that sank her. Two torpedoes hit Minneapolis, blowing her bow clean off. Meanwhile, one torpedo hit New Orleans, igniting her turret one magazines and blowing off the entire section of the cruiser forward of her super firing turret.
