= Japanese destroyer Oyashio =

Kagerō-class destroyer

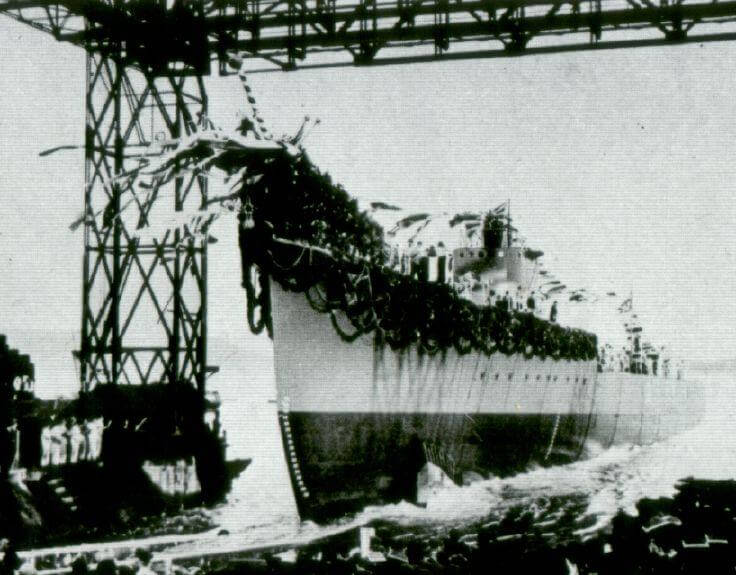
- Launching of Oyashio, 28 November 1938

History

Empire of Japan
- Name: Oyashio
- Builder: Maizuru Naval Arsenal
- Laid down: 29 March 1938
- Launched: 29 November 1938
- Completed: 20 August 1940
- Stricken: 20 June 1943
- Fate: Sunk in action, 8 May 1943

General characteristics
- Class & type: Kagerō-class destroyer
- Displacement: 2,033 long tons (2,066 t) standard
- Length: 118.5 m (388 ft 9 in)
- Beam: 10.8 m (35 ft 5 in)
- Draft: 3.8 m (12 ft 6 in)
- Propulsion: 3 × Kampon water tube boilers; 2 × Kanpon impulse turbines; 2 × shafts, 52,000 shp (39 MW)
- Speed: 35.5 knots (40.9 mph; 65.7 km/h)
- Range: 5,000 NM at 18 knots (21 mph; 33 km/h)
- Complement: 239
- Armament: (1939); 6 × 12.7 cm/50 Type 3 DP guns; 2 × Type 96 25 mm AA guns; 8 × 610 mm (24 in) torpedo tubes; 18 depth charges; 2 × paravanes; (1943); 6 × 12.7 cm/50 Type 3 DP guns; 8 × Type 96 25 mm AA guns; 8 × 610 mm (24 in) torpedo tubes; 18 depth charges

Oyashio (親潮, lit. Father Current, from Oyashio Current) was the fourth vessel to be commissioned in the 19-vessel Kagerō-class destroyers built for the Imperial Japanese Navy in the late 1930s under the Circle Three Supplementary Naval Expansion Program (Maru San Keikaku).

== Background ==
The Kagerō-class destroyers were outwardly almost identical to the preceding light cruiser-sized Asashio class, with improvements made by Japanese naval architects to improve stability and to take advantage of Japan's lead in torpedo technology. They were designed to accompany the Japanese main striking force and in both day and night attacks against the United States Navy as it advanced across the Pacific Ocean, according to Japanese naval strategic projections. Despite being one of the most powerful classes of destroyers in the world at the time of their completion, only one survived the Pacific War.

Oyashio, built at the Maizuru Naval Arsenal, was laid down on 29 March 1938, launched on 29 November 1938 and commissioned on 20 August 1940.

== Operational history ==
At the time of the attack on Pearl Harbor, Oyashio, was assigned to Destroyer Division 15 (Desdiv 15), and a member of Destroyer Squadron 2 (Desron 2) of the IJN 2nd Fleet, and had deployed from Palau, as part of the escort for the aircraft carrier Ryūjō in the invasion of the southern Philippines and minelayer Itsukushima.

In early 1942, Oyashio participated in the invasion of the Netherlands East Indies, escorting the invasion forces for Menado, Kendari and Ambon in January, and the invasion forces for Makassar, Timor and Java in February. On 8 February, she was present when the destroyer Natsushio was torpedoed by the submarine USS S-37. Oyashio escorted Natsushio under tow, but it became obvious she was fatally damaged, prompting Oyashio to help remove her crew and left the torpedoed destroyer to sink. On 5 March Oyashio and the destroyer Kuroshio located an unidentified British ship which they believed to be a minelayer and engaged the enemy. Oyashio fired 84 12.7 cm (5 in) shells while Kuroshio expended 50, sinking the British vessel. The identify of the ship they sank has never been confirmed. The British cargo ship Sisunthon Nawa went missing around the same time and was presumed sunk by the Japanese, meaning it's possible she was the ship Oyashio helped to sink. At the end of March, she returned with the aircraft carrier Kaga from Staring-baai in Sulawesi to Sasebo.

At the end of April, Oyashio deployed from Kure to assist in the occupation of the Cagayan Islands near Palawan in early May, and then returned with the damaged aircraft carrier Shōkaku from Manila to Kure on 17 May. In early June, Oyashio deployed from Saipan as part of the troopship escort for the Battle of Midway.

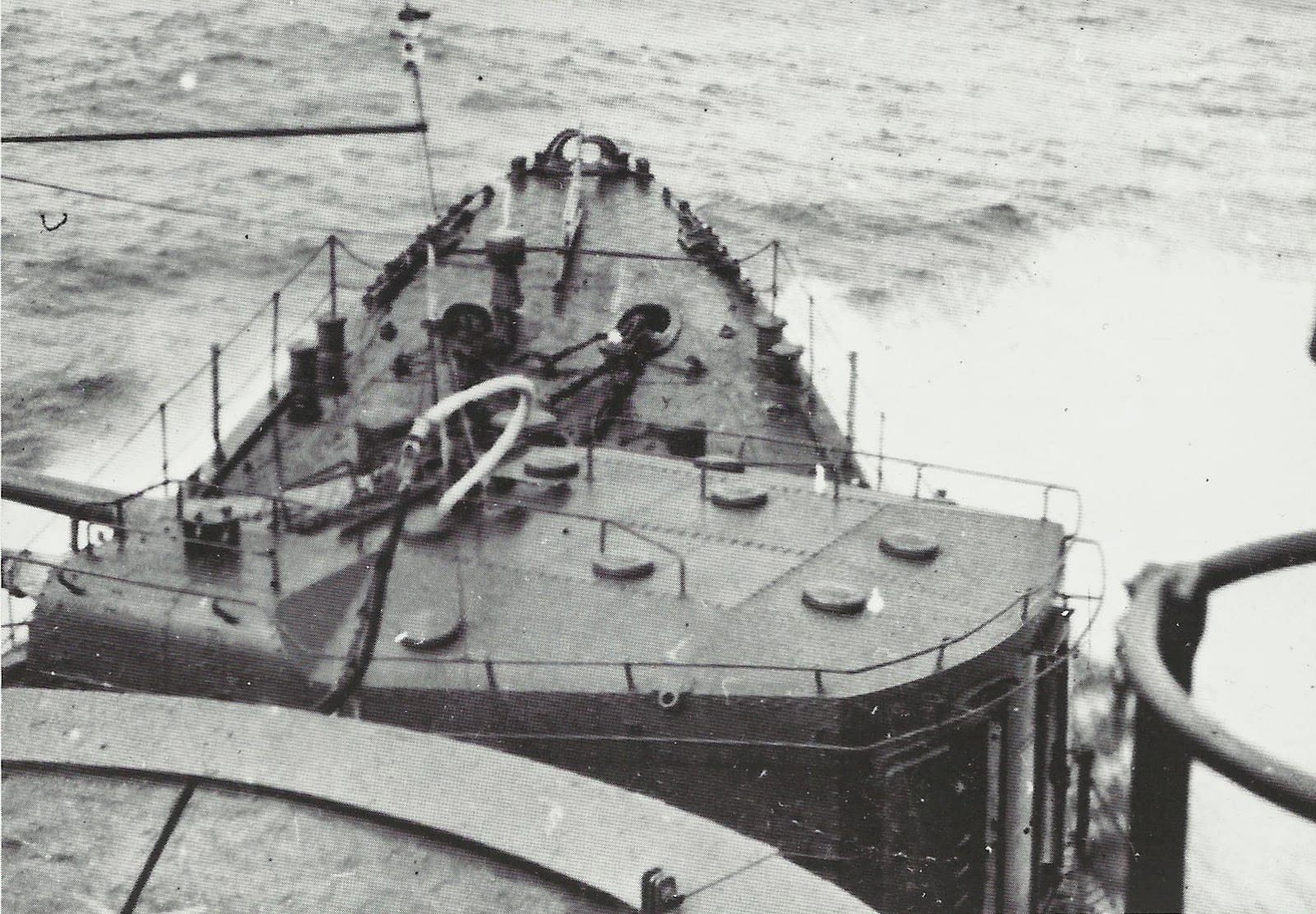
Oyashio training her forward 12.7 cm (5 in) gun turret on training duty

In mid-June, Oyashio was assigned as escort for cruisers in projected further Indian Ocean raids, but the operation was cancelled by the time she reached Mergui in Burma, and she was reassigned as escort for the cruisers Kumano and Suzuya to Balikpapan and the Solomon Islands. During the Battle of the Eastern Solomons of 24 August she was part of Admiral Kondō's Advance Force, but was not in combat. During September, Oyashio was used for patrols between Truk and Guadalcanal, and in October began operations as a "Tokyo Express" high speed troop transport to Guadalcanal. These operations continued to early-February 1943. During the Battle of Santa Cruz on 26 October, she was assigned to Admiral Kurita's Support Force, returning after the battle with Maya and Suzuya to Shortland Island.

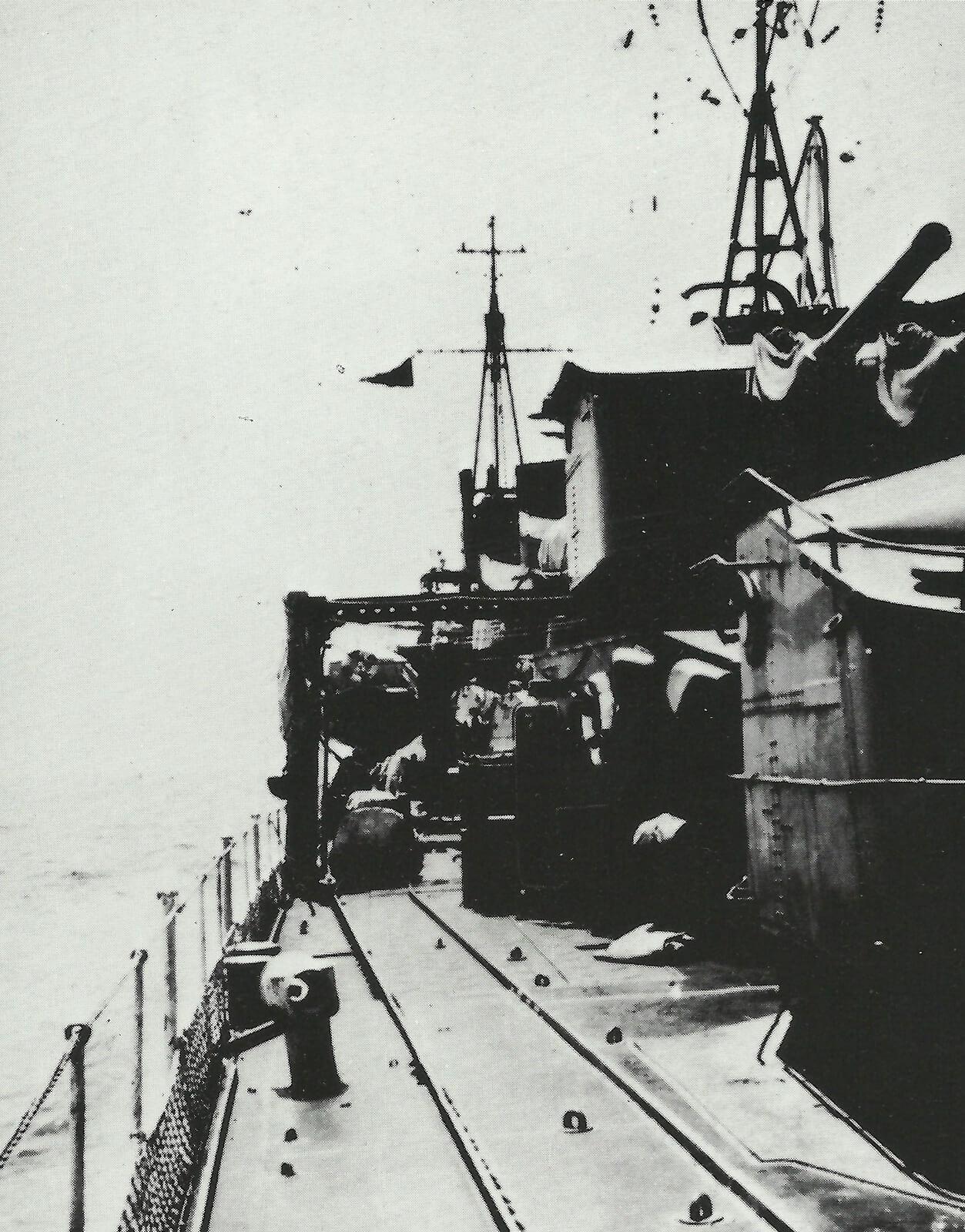
Oyashio's aft turrets

During the Naval Battle of Guadalcanal on 13–15 November, Oyashio, took part in escorting a troop convoy. Upon learning of the action at the 2nd battle, Oyashio departed alongside the destroyer Kagerō to engage the enemy ships. They joined the fight late, but managed to fire a torpedo spread against the American battleship USS Washington, but inflicted no damage. After the battle, she returned with the cruiser Chōkai to Rabaul. On 21 November, she sortied from Rabaul to assist the destroyer Umikaze. On the 29th, Oyashio departed for a supply transport mission, but the next night was intercepted by a US cruiser-destroyer force in what became known as the battle of Tassafaronga. After torpedoes from the destroyer Takanami crippled the heavy cruisers USS New Orleans and Minneapolis at her own sacrifice, Oyashio was the first destroyer to respond in a counterattack against the American ships, launching a spread of eight torpedoes, followed closely by the Kuroshio, Kawakaze, and Naganami. Oyashio found success in this role as it was one of her torpedoes that crippled the heavy cruiser USS Pensacola, flooding her engine and disabling three of her four 8-inch (203 mm) gun turrets, taking the cruiser out of action for an entire year. Afterwards, two torpedoes probably from Kawakaze sank the heavy cruiser USS Northampton.

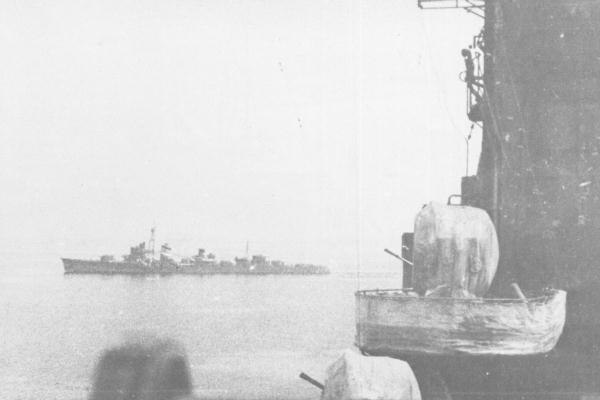
The destroyer in this photo is often credited as Oyashio. However, evidence proves this is actually the Tamanami.

On 9 February, Oyashio returned to Kure for repairs, together with the troopship Hakozaki Maru. She returned on 10 April to Truk together with the aircraft carriers Chūyō and Taiyō. At the end of April, she was at Shortland Island, and reassigned to troop transport runs.

On the night of 7–8 May 1943, while on a troop transport run to Kolombangara, Oyashio struck mines when leaving Vila (Kolombangara). While dead in the water, she was hit by an air attack, during which strafing and a direct bomb hit took 91 lives. She sank at coordinates (08°08′S 156°55′E). She was removed from the navy list on 20 June 1943.

== See also ==
- List of ships of the Imperial Japanese Navy

== Books ==
- Brown, David (1990). Warship Losses of World War Two. Naval Institute Press. ISBN 1-55750-914-X.
- D'Albas, Andrieu (1965). Death of a Navy: Japanese Naval Action in World War II. Devin-Adair Pub. ISBN 0-8159-5302-X.
- Evans, David (1979). Kaigun: Strategy, Tactics, and Technology in the Imperial Japanese Navy, 1887–1941. US Naval Institute Press. ISBN 0-87021-192-7.
- Roger Chesneau, ed. (1980). Conway's All the World's Fighting Ships 1922–1946. Grenwitch: Conway Maritime Press. ISBN 0-85177-146-7.
- Howarth, Stephen (1983). The Fighting Ships of the Rising Sun: The Drama of the Imperial Japanese Navy, 1895–1945. Atheneum. ISBN 0-689-11402-8.
- Jentsura, Hansgeorg (1976). Warships of the Imperial Japanese Navy, 1869–1945. US Naval Institute Press. ISBN 0-87021-893-X.
- Watts, A.J. (1966). Japanese warships of World War II. Ian Allan. ISBN 0711002150.
- Watts, Anthony; Gordon, Brian (1971). The Imperial Japanese Navy. Macdonald. ISBN 0356030458.
- Whitley, M. J. (1988). Destroyers of World War 2. Cassell Publishing. ISBN 1-85409-521-8.
- Mitchell, WH; Sawyer, LA (1990). The Empire Ships. Lloyd's of London Press Ltd. ISBN 1-85044-275-4.
