= Japanese destroyer Kuroshio =

Kagerō-class destroyer

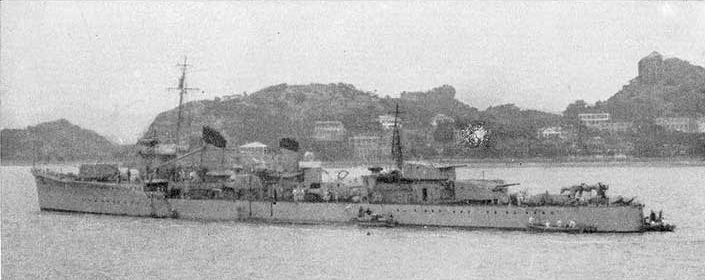
- Kuroshio anchored off China in the Spring of 1941

History

Empire of Japan
- Name: Kuroshio
- Builder: Fujinagata Shipyards, Osaka
- Laid down: 31 August 1937
- Launched: 28 October 1938
- Completed: 27 January 1940
- Stricken: 23 June 1943
- Fate: Sunk in action, 8 May 1943

General characteristics
- Class & type: Kagerō-class destroyer
- Displacement: 2,033 long tons (2,066 t) standard
- Length: 118.5 m (388 ft 9 in)
- Beam: 10.8 m (35 ft 5 in)
- Draft: 3.8 m (12 ft 6 in)
- Propulsion: 3 × Kampon water tube boilers; 2 × Kanpon impulse turbines; 2 × shafts, 52,000 shp (39 MW)
- Speed: 35.5 knots (40.9 mph; 65.7 km/h)
- Range: 5,000 NM at 18 knots (21 mph; 33 km/h)
- Complement: 239
- Armament: (1939); 6 × 12.7 cm/50 Type 3 DP guns; 2 × Type 96 25 mm AA guns; 8 × 610 mm (24 in) torpedo tubes; 18 depth charges; 2 × paravanes; (1943); 8 × Type 96 25 mm AA guns; 36 depth charges

Kuroshio (黒潮, "Black Current" or "Black Tide", Kuroshio Current) was the third vessel to be commissioned in the 19-vessel Kagerō-class destroyers built for the Imperial Japanese Navy in the late-1930s under the Circle Three Supplementary Naval Expansion Program (Maru San Keikaku).

== Background ==
The Kagerō-class destroyers were outwardly almost identical to the preceding light cruiser-sized Asashio class, with improvements made by Japanese naval architects to improve stability and to take advantage of Japan's lead in torpedo technology. They were designed to accompany the Japanese main striking force and in both day and night attacks against the United States Navy as it advanced across the Pacific Ocean, according to Japanese naval strategic projections. Despite being one of the most powerful classes of destroyers in the world at the time of their completion, only one survived the Pacific War.

Kuroshio, built at the Fujinagata Shipyards in Osaka, was laid down on 31 August 1937, launched on 25 October 1938 and commissioned on 27 January 1940. After commissioning, Kuroshio was appointed as flagship to the 16th destroyer division (Kuroshio, Hatsukaze, Yukikaze), and led the division through several peacetime patrol duties and visits to foreign harbors. On 11 October 1940, Kuroshio entered Yokohama as part of a 98-ship fleet to be inspected by Emperor Hirohito as the last large scale Japanese navy fleet review before the start of the Pacific War.

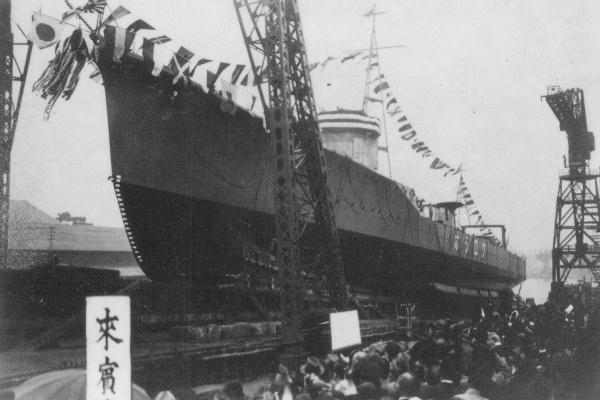
The launching of Kuroshio, 28 October 1938

At the end of 1940, the destroyers Amatsukaze and Tokitsukaze were completed, and replaced Kuroshio as members of the 16th destroyer division. Kuroshio was instead reassigned to destroyer division 15 (Natsushio, Oyashio, Hayashio, Kuroshio). Entering 1941, Kuroshio engaged in a series of patrol and training duties between China and Japan, but before her crew grew too bored, on 23 June the destroyers Natsushio and Minegumo collided into each other; Natsushio's bow smashing into Minegumo's amidships. Kuroshio attempted to reverse, but it was too late as her bow gouged into Minegumo's stern, inflicting immense damage and destroying her turret 3. In turn, Kuroshio's bow caved in, requiring the destroyer to sail in reverse for the Kure naval arsenal, where she was repaired over 3 days. A series on training duties ensued until 9 October 1941 when Kuroshio was present during a fleet meeting in Yokosuka, where Admiral Yamamoto announced the plan for war aboard the battleship Nagato.

== WWII ==
At the time of the attack on Pearl Harbor, Kuroshio, was assigned to Destroyer Division 15 (Desdiv 15), and a member of Destroyer Squadron 2 (Desron 2) of the IJN 2nd Fleet, and had deployed from Palau, as part of the escort for the aircraft carrier Ryūjō in the invasion of the southern Philippines and minelayer Itsukushima. She suffered minor damage on 23 December due to a strafing attack by USAAF B-17 Flying Fortress bombers.

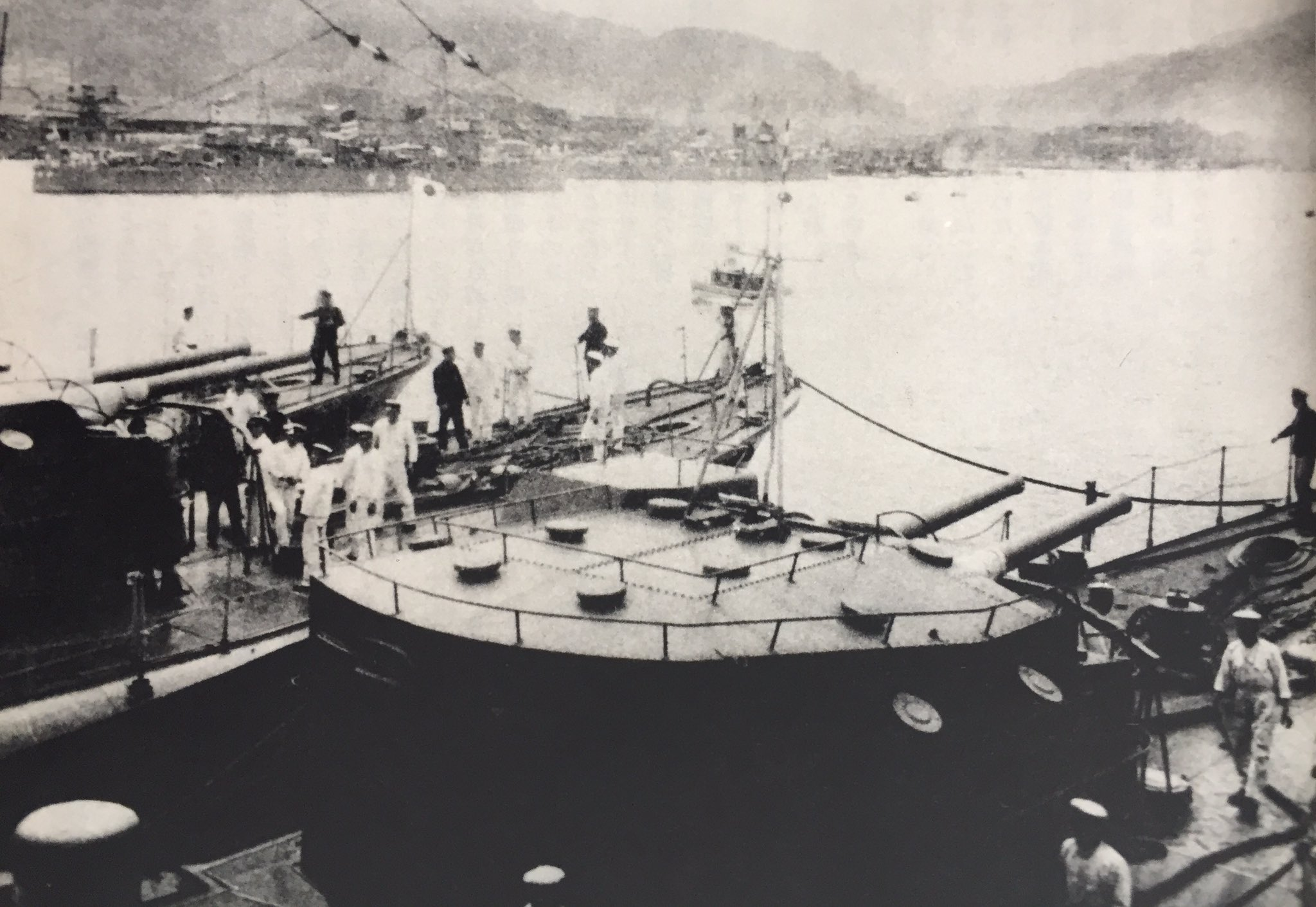
The 2nd torpedo squadron anchored in Taiwan, April of 1940. Kuroshio (right) and Yukikaze (left) are seen entering the port at a distance from the 8th destroyer division

In early 1942, Kuroshio participated in the invasion of the Netherlands East Indies, escorting the invasion forces for Menado, Kendari and Ambon in January, and the invasion forces for Makassar, Timor and Java in February. On 8 February, she rescued survivors from Natsushio and on 5 March assisted the destroyer Oyashio in sinking a Royal Navy minelayer. At the end of March, she returned with Kaga from Staring-baai in Sulawesi to Sasebo.

At the end of April, Kuroshio deployed from Kure to assist in the occupation of the Cagayan Islands near Palawan in early May, and then returned with the damaged aircraft carrier Shōkaku from Manila to Kure on 17 May. In early June, Kuroshio deployed from Saipan as part of the troopship escort for the Battle of Midway.

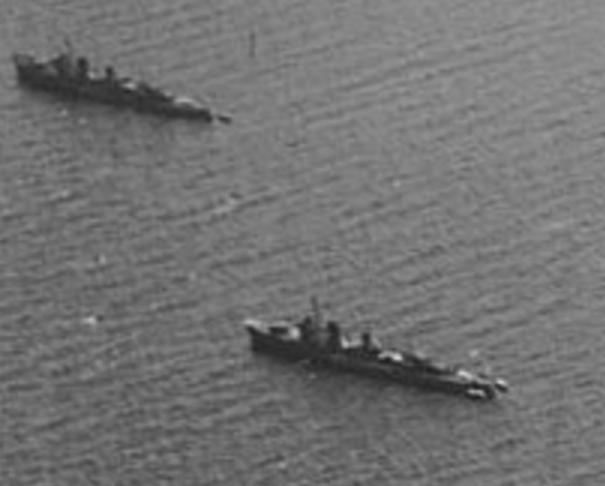
Kuroshio (top) and Shiranui (bottom) anchored off Yokohama during a Japanese navy fleet review, 11 October 1940

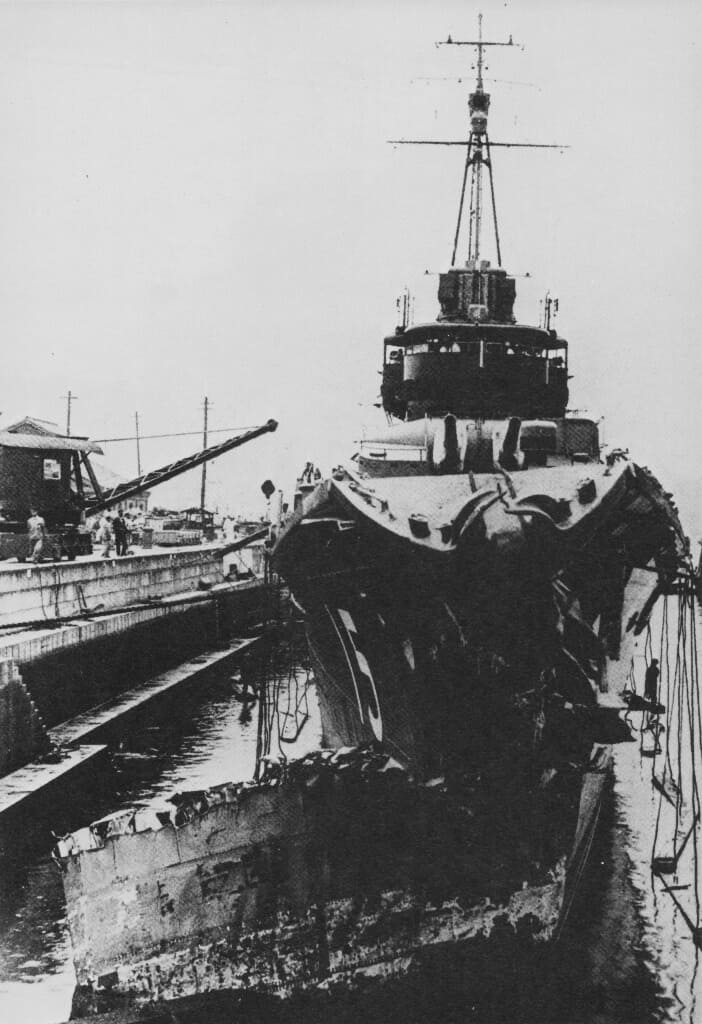
Kuroshio under repairs on June 24 1941 after colliding with the destroyers Minegumo and Natsushio

In mid-June, Kuroshio was assigned as escort for cruisers in projected further Indian Ocean raids, but the operation was cancelled by the time she reached Mergui in Burma, and she was reassigned as escort for the cruisers Kumano and Suzuya to Balikpapan and the Solomon Islands. During the Battle of the Eastern Solomons of 24 August she was part of Admiral Kondō's Advance Force, but was not in combat. During September, Kuroshio was used for patrols between Truk and Guadalcanal, and in October began operations as a “Tokyo Express" high speed troop transport to Guadalcanal. These operations continued to mid-February 1943. During the Battle of Santa Cruz on 26 October, she was assigned to escort the aircraft carrier Jun'yō. Kuroshio was also at the Battle of Tassafaronga on 30 November, during which one of her torpedoes may have hit the American cruiser USS Pensacola.

On 21 February, Kuroshio returned to Kure for repairs, together with Jun'yō, and returned on 10 April to Truk together with the aircraft carriers Chūyō and Taiyō. At the end of April, she was at Shortland Island, and reassigned to troop transport runs.

On the night of 7–8 May 1943, while on a troop transport run to Kolombangara, she struck mines when leaving Vila (Kolombangara), and exploded and sank at coordinates (08°08′S 156°55′E), with loss of 83 lives. She was removed from the navy list on 20 June 1943.

== Wreck ==
In the early hours of May 8, 1943, a Japanese destroyer approached Vila using the eastern route, arriving at 1:26 AM to unload personnel and cargo. After completing its mission, it embarked 300 personnel for evacuation and departed at 3:12 AM via the western route. As the ship entered the Blackett Strait, it unknowingly entered a U.S. Navy (USN) minefield, laid the previous night by American light minesweepers. At 3:59 AM, the destroyer struck a sea mine near latitude 8° 08' S, longitude 156° 55' E. The explosion occurred aft, killing 83 crew members and flooding the engine rooms and crew compartments, causing the vessel to lose power and drift helplessly. Soon after, a second explosion led to the ship sinking. Unaware of the minefield, the other destroyers in the formation took up defensive positions. However, both Oyashio and Kagero also struck mines and sustained significant damage.

Following the sinking, survivors, including Commander Sugitani, were rescued by boats from Oyashio, which later also sank. Other survivors managed to swim ashore on Kolombangara, where they regrouped with Japanese forces stationed on the island.

On May 19, 2002, Robert Ballard, the marine archeologist who discovered the wreck of Titanic was leading an expedition in the Blackett Strait in efforts to located the famous PT-109 (patrol torpedo boat) that was commanded by future United States president John F. Kennedy when he and his team stumbled upon the wreck of an unknown Japanese destroyer. After thorough examination, the team identified the ship as Kuroshio, which had been lost in action during World War II. Dale R. Ridder, who was part of the search effort, provided further insights into the condition of the wreck saying, "When we looked at it while I was out there it appeared from the wreckage on the bottom that both the bow and the stern magazines had exploded from the mine hits, which is somewhat unusual. Sonar images show the ship capsized before sinking, as indicated by the position of the wreckage. One of the torpedo mounts was found approximately 75 yards away from the main wreck. However, prior to arriving at the bottom, some 1300 feet down, she righted herself, and the main undamaged midships section was sitting upright on the bottom.

== See also ==
- List of ships of the Imperial Japanese Navy

== Books ==
- Brown, David (1990). Warship Losses of World War Two. Naval Institute Press. ISBN 1-55750-914-X.
- D'Albas, Andrieu (1965). Death of a Navy: Japanese Naval Action in World War II. Devin-Adair Pub. ISBN 0-8159-5302-X.
- Evans, David (1979). Kaigun: Strategy, Tactics, and Technology in the Imperial Japanese Navy, 1887–1941. US Naval Institute Press. ISBN 0-87021-192-7.
- Roger Chesneau, ed. (1980). Conway's All the World's Fighting Ships 1922–1946. Grenwitch: Conway Maritime Press. ISBN 0-85177-146-7.
- Howarth, Stephen (1983). The Fighting Ships of the Rising Sun: The Drama of the Imperial Japanese Navy, 1895–1945. Atheneum. ISBN 0-689-11402-8.
- Jentsura, Hansgeorg (1976). Warships of the Imperial Japanese Navy, 1869–1945. US Naval Institute Press. ISBN 0-87021-893-X.
- Watts, A.J. (1966). Japanese warships of World War II. Ian Allan. ISBN 0711002150.
- Whitley, M. J. (1988). Destroyers of World War 2. Cassell Publishing. ISBN 1-85409-521-8.
