= Kagerō-class destroyer =

Class of Japanese destroyers

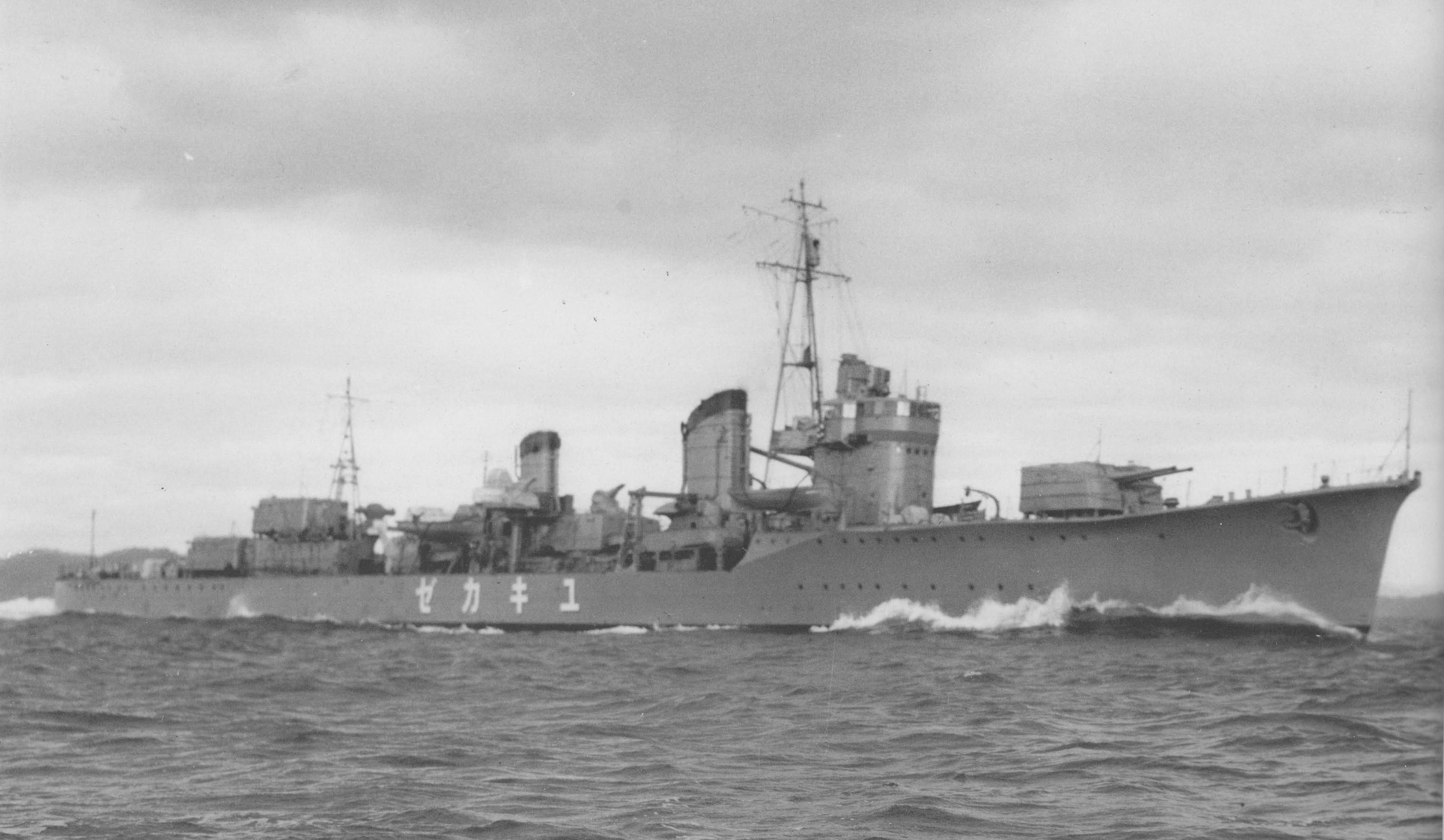
- Yukikaze in December 1939

Class overview
- Name: Kagerō class
- Builders: Uraga Dock Company (6); Fujinagata Shipyards (5); Maizuru Naval Arsenal (5); Sasebo Naval Arsenal (2); Kawasaki Dockyard Co. (1)
- Operators: Imperial Japanese Navy; Republic of China Navy
- Preceded by: Asashio class
- Succeeded by: Yūgumo class; Shimakaze
- In commission: 1939–1947 (Japan), 1947–1966 (Republic of China)
- Planned: 18 (1937) + 4 (1939)
- Completed: 19
- Cancelled: 3 (the dummies for the naval budget of the Yamato-class battleships)
- Lost: 18
- Scrapped: 1

General characteristics
- Type: Destroyer
- Displacement: 2,000 long tons (2,032 t) standard; 2,500 long tons (2,540 t) battle condition
- Length: 118.5 m (388 ft 9 in) full, 116.2 m (381 ft 3 in) waterline
- Beam: 10.8 m (35 ft 5 in)
- Draught: 3.76 m (12 ft 4 in)
- Propulsion: 3 × Kampon water-tube boilers, 2 × Kanpon impulse turbines, 2 × shafts, 52,000 shp (39,000 kW)
- Speed: 35.5 knots (65.7 km/h; 40.9 mph)
- Range: 6,053 nautical miles (11,210 km; 6,966 mi)
- Complement: 240 (Kagerō, 1939)
- Armament: (Kagerō, 1939); 6 (3xII) x Type 3 127 mm 50-caliber naval guns (3×2); 4 (2×II) x 25 mm Type 96 AA guns; 8 (2xIV) × Type 92 torpedo tubes (2×4); 16 × 610 mm (24 in) Type 93 torpedoes; 18 × Type 95 depth charges; 2 × paravanes; (Yukikaze, April 1945); 4 (2xII) × Type 3 127 mm 50-caliber naval guns (2×2); 28 (4xIII, 1xII, 14xI) × 25 mm Type 96 AA guns; 4 × 13 mm Type 95 AA guns; 8 (2xIV) × Type 92 torpedo tubes (2×4); 16 × 610 mm Type 93 torpedoes; 36 × Type 2 or Type 3 depth charges

The Kagerō-class destroyers (陽炎型駆逐艦, Kagerō-gata Kuchikukan) were a class of nineteen 1st Class destroyers built for the Imperial Japanese Navy during the 1930s, and operated by them during the Pacific War, where all but one were lost. They were also called the Shiranui-class destroyers (不知火型駆逐艦, Shiranui-gata Kuchikukan), because the second ship, Shiranui, was launched before the first ship, Kagerō.

The class was also one of a series called Destroyer Type-A (甲型駆逐艦, Kō-gata Kuchikukan) within the Imperial Japanese Navy from their plan name. At the time of introduction, these destroyers were among the deadliest destroyers afloat, primarily due to the excellent range and lethality of their "Long Lance" torpedoes.

== Background ==
Following on the success of the Asashio class, the Kagerō class was very similar in design, but was slightly larger and incorporated a number of improvements which had been gained through operational experience. It had a heavier main battery and much heavier torpedo armament than other contemporary foreign destroyer designs. The first 15 ships of this class were ordered in 1937 under the 3rd Naval Armaments Supplement Programme and the final four vessels were ordered in 1939 under the 4th Naval Armaments Supplement Programme. The final vessel in the class, Akigumo, was sometimes mistaken for part of the succeeding Yūgumo class by immediate postwar historians due to confusion over the number of fictitious destroyers listed in the Japanese budgetary records in an effort to conceal the budget devoted to the secret Yamato-class battleships.

== Design and description ==
The Kagerō class used a similar but slightly enlarged hull and bridge as the preceding Asashio class and had an almost identical silhouette. The main visual difference was that the reloads for the forward torpedo launcher were located in front of the launcher instead of to the rear. The ships measured 118.5 meters (388 ft 9 in) overall, with a beam of 10.8 meters (35 ft 5 in) and a draft of 3.76 meters (12 ft 4 in). They displaced 2,065 metric tons (2,032 long tons) at standard load and 2,529 metric tons (2,489 long tons) at deep load. The displacement and beam were thus slightly larger than for the Asashio class, giving greater stability.

Their crew numbered 240 officers and enlisted men. The ships had two Kampon geared steam turbines, each driving one propeller shaft, using steam provided by three Kampon water-tube boilers. The turbines were rated at a total of 52,000 shaft horsepower (39,000 kW) for a designed speed of 35 knots (65 km/h; 40 mph). However, the class proved capable of exceeding 35.5 knots on sea trials. The ships were designed with a range of 5,000 nautical miles (9,300 km; 5,800 mi) at a speed of 18 knots (33 km/h; 21 mph). However, the class more accurately proved to have a range of 6,053 nautical miles (11,210 km; 6,966 mi) on trials. The Amatsukaze differed from her sisterships in having an experimental boiler system that built up a higher steam pressure. While the ship's top speed of 35.5 knots remained unaffected, she possessed a remarkably superior fuel economy to her sister ships, and thus scored a longer range. This engine design was used as a basis for the Japanese "super destroyer" Shimakaze.

=== Armament ===
As built, the weapons suite of the Kagerō class was identical to that of the preceding Asashio class. The main battery consisted of six 5-inch 12.7 cm/50 Type 3 naval guns in three twin-gun turrets, one superfiring pair aft and one turret forward of the superstructure. The guns were capable of 55-degree elevation. The ships were also armed with eight 610-millimeter (24.0 in) torpedo tubes for the oxygen-fueled Type 93 "Long Lance" torpedo in two quadruple traversing mounts; one reload was carried for each tube. Their anti-submarine weapons initially comprised 16 depth charges, which was increased to 36 during the course of the Pacific War.

In terms of anti-aircraft capability, initially two twin-mount Type 96 AA guns were placed forward of the second smokestack. As the war progressed, the number of Type 96 guns was gradually increased. In 1942–1943, the twin mounts were replaced by triple mounts, and another twin mount was added forward of the bridge. From 1943 to 1944, on surviving vessels the superfiring "X" turret was removed and replaced by two more triple mounts. In late 1944, the seven surviving vessels were fitted with a varying number of additional guns. Isokaze and Hamakaze received seven single mounts, whereas Yukikaze received 14 single mounts and four Type 93 13 mm machine guns.

Hamakaze became the first Japanese destroyer to be equipped with radar when a Type 22 set was installed in late 1942. The other vessels were equipped with radar as they rotated back to Japan for repair or refit. All seven vessels surviving in mid-1944 also received a Type 13 radar.

== Ships in class ==
Construction data
Prog. no.	Ship	Kanji	Shipyard	Laid down	Launched	Completed	Fate
17	Kagerō	陽炎	Maizuru Naval Arsenal	3 September 1937	27 September 1938	6 November 1939	Crippled by mine, finished off by air attack SW of Rendova (New Georgia Campaign), 8 May 1943 at 08°08′S 156°55′E
18	Shiranui	不知火	Uraga Dock Company	30 August 1937	28 June 1938	20 December 1939	Air attack N of Iloilo, Panay, 27 October 1944 at 12°0′N 122°30′E
19	Kuroshio	黒潮	Fujinagata Shipyards	31 August 1937	25 October 1938	27 January 1940	Mined leaving Vila, Kolombangara (New Georgia Campaign), 8 May 1943 at 08°08′S 156°55′E
20	Oyashio	親潮	Maizuru Naval Arsenal	29 March 1938	29 November 1938	20 August 1940	Crippled by mine, finished off by air attack leaving Vila, Kolombangara (New Georgia Campaign), 8 May 1943 at 08°08′S 156°55′E
21	Hayashio	早潮	Uraga Dock Company	30 June 1938	19 April 1939	31 August 1940	Scuttled after air attack, Guna Bay (New Guinea Campaign), 24 November 1942 at 07°0′S 147°30′E
22	Natsushio	夏潮	Fujinagata Shipyards	9 December 1937	23 February 1939	31 August 1940	Torpedoed by USS S-37 S of Makassar, 9 February 1942 at 05°10′S 119°24′E
23	Hatsukaze	初風	Kawasaki Dockyard Co.	3 December 1937	24 January 1939	15 February 1940	Sunk in Battle of Empress Augusta Bay, 2 November 1943 at 06°01′S 153°58′E
24	Yukikaze	雪風	Sasebo Naval Arsenal	2 August 1938	24 March 1939	20 January 1940	Surrendered to Republic of China on 6 July 1947 at Shanghai, renamed DD-12 Tan Yang (丹陽); scrapped 1970
25	Amatsukaze	天津風	Maizuru Naval Arsenal	14 February 1939	19 October 1939	26 October 1940	Damaged beyond repair by submarine USS Redfin, 10 January 1945, finished off by air attacks 6 April 1945 at 24°30′N 118°10′E
26	Tokitsukaze	時津風	Uraga Dock Company	20 February 1939	10 November 1939	15 December 1940	Air attack SE of Finschhafen, 3 March 1943 at 07°16′S 148°15′E
27	Urakaze	浦風	Fujinagata Shipyards	11 April 1939	19 April 1940	15 December 1940	Torpedoed by USS Sealion NNW of Keelung, Taiwan, 21 November 1944 at 26°09′N 121°23′E
28	Isokaze	磯風	Sasebo Naval Arsenal	25 November 1938	19 June 1939	30 November 1940	Scuttled SW of Nagasaki following air attack, 7 April 1945 at 30.46°N 128.92°E
29	Hamakaze	浜風	Uraga Dock Company	20 November 1939	25 November 1940	30 June 1941	Air attack SW of Nagasaki, 7 April 1945 at 30°47′N 128°08′E
30	Tanikaze	谷風	Fujinagata Shipyards	18 October 1939	1 November 1940	25 April 1941	Torpedoed by USS Harder in Sibutu Passage, 9 June 1944 at 05°42′N 120°41′E
31	Nowaki	野分	Maizuru Naval Arsenal	8 November 1939	17 September 1940	28 April 1941	Sunk in the aftermath of the Battle off Samar, 26 October 1944 at 13°0′N 124°54′E
32–34	—N/a	—N/a	—N/a	—N/a	—N/a	—N/a	The dummy for the naval budget of the Yamato-class battleships
112	Arashi	嵐	Maizuru Naval Arsenal	4 May 1939	22 April 1940	27 January 1941	Sunk in Battle of Vella Gulf (New Georgia Campaign), 6 August 1943 at 07°50′S 156°55′E
113	Hagikaze	萩風	Uraga Dock Company	23 May 1939	18 June 1940	31 March 1941	Sunk in Battle of Vella Gulf, 6 August 1943 at 07°50′S 156°55′E
114	Maikaze	舞風	Fujinagata Shipyards	22 April 1940	13 March 1941	15 July 1941	Sunk in surface action during Operation Hailstone at Truk, 17 February 1944 at 07°45′N 151°20′E
115	Akigumo	秋雲	Uraga Dock Company	2 July 1940	11 April 1941	27 September 1941	Torpedoed by USS Redfin SE of Zamboanga, Philippines, 11 April 1944 at 06°43′N 122°23′E

== Operational history ==
Seven out of the nine destroyers of the Pearl Harbor strike force were of the Kagerō class; Kagerō, Shiranui, Urakaze, Tanikaze, Isokaze, Hamakaze, and Akigumo. On the first day of World War II for Japan, Nowaki and Hagikaze captured the Norwegian cargo ship Helios before the Kagerō class took part in a large variety of convoy and carrier escorting duties, and the occasional shore bombardment, to support the invasion of the Philippines and Dutch East Indies. Notably, the Amatsukaze captured the port of Davao by bombarding the naval facilities to send back British machine gunners and destroyed a British oil tanker in the process. In the latter campaign, Natsushio became the first loss of the class when she was torpedoed and sunk by the submarine USS S-37, while the entirety of destroyer division 16 took part in the Battle of the Java Sea where Tokitsukaze was damaged by a 4.7-inch (12 cm) shell hit from the destroyer HMS Electra but otherwise did not do anything of note. In the battle's aftermath, Amatsukaze assisted in capturing the Dutch hospital ship Op Ten Noort.

The careers of the Kagerō class began to pick up in March 1942 with the fall of the Dutch East Indies, with Nowaki and Arashi picking up an active role hunting down Allied ships attempting to escape to Australia, during which they together either sank or helped to sink the destroyer HMS Stronghold, the gunboat USS Asheville, the sloop HMAS Yarra, three minesweepers, an oil tanker, four cargo ships, and a depot ship, alongside helping to capture three cargo ships. Amatsukaze and Hatsukaze helped to sink the submarine USS Perch before Amatsukaze destroyed the Dutch submarine K-10. Shiranui, Kagerō, and Isokaze helped to sink the Dutch freighter Modjokerto, while Urakaze helped to sink the Dutch freighter Enggano, and Hayashio captured the Dutch steamship Speelman. From then on, a series of escorting duties ensued until the Battle of Midway, during which Kagerō-class destroyers escorted the aircraft carriers, invasion convoy, and battleship force. Particularly, Arashi attacked the submarine USS Nautilus, enabling Arashi to be spotted by an American aircraft and trailed to the location of the Japanese aircraft carriers, leading to a devastating defeat in which all four Japanese carriers and the heavy cruiser Mikuma were sunk by American carrier-based aircraft. After the battle, Arashi's crew committed a war crime by murdering downed USS Yorktown pilot Ensign Wesley Osmus.

Service of the destroyers continued to the Solomon Islands and Guadalcanal campaigns, which saw much of the same service but mixed with troop and supply transport missions - during which Arashi helped to sink the US freighter Anshun - plus escorting carriers at the battles of the Eastern Solomons and Santa Cruz. In the latter battle, Akigumo assisted in finishing off the crippled and abandoned aircraft carrier USS Hornet. On 13 November, Amatsukaze and Yukikaze fought in the first naval battle of Guadalcanal and both became key players of the engagement. With torpedo hits, Amatsukaze sank the destroyer USS Barton and helped to sink the light cruiser USS Juneau before shelling the crippled heavy cruiser USS San Francisco, but in turn was blasted by the light cruiser USS Helena. She survived and withdrew to Truk. In stark contrast, Yukikaze survived the battle completely undamaged, and for her part helped to sink the destroyer USS Cushing with gunfire and sank the destroyer USS Laffey with a torpedo hit to her stern, alongside helping to cripple the destroyer USS Sterett and lightly damage the destroyer USS O'Bannon before transporting survivors from the sunken battleship Hiei to Truk. Two days later, Kagerō and Oyashio fired torpedoes at the battleship USS Washington during the second naval battle of Guadalcanal, but inflicted no damage. On 25 November, Hayashio was sunk by land-based aircraft, while on 30 November, Kagerō, Kuroshio, and Oyashio took part in the Battle of Tassafaronga, where Kagerō helped to sink the heavy cruiser USS Northampton.

With the start of 1943, Hatsukaze and Tokitsukaze sank the American torpedo boats PT-43 and PT-112, while Isokaze and Maikaze sank the submarine USS Argonaut before both being damaged by American aircraft during Operation Ke. In March, Tokitsukaze was sunk by land-based aircraft during the Battle of the Bismarck Sea. On 8 May, Kagerō, Kuroshio, and Oyashio all ran into a minefield, Kuroshio blew up and sank instantly while Kagerō and Oyashio were crippled and finished off by land-based aircraft. In July, Tanikaze helped to sink the light cruiser USS Helena at the Battle of Kula Gulf, while Yukikaze and Hamakaze both served in the Battle of Kolombangara where they helped to sink the destroyer USS Gwin and cripple the light cruisers USS Honolulu and St. Louis, while Yukikaze directly torpedoed the light cruiser HMNZS Leander, damaging her so badly she could not be repaired before the end of the war. On 7 August, Arashi and Hagikaze were sunk by gunfire and torpedoes from the destroyers USS Dunlap, Craven, and Maury at the Battle of Vella Gulf, then a week later Hamakaze and Isokaze both helped to defend a troop convoy against US destroyers at the Battle off Horaniu, both being damaged by one 5-inch (127 mm) shell hit, before Isokaze and Akigumo did the same at the battle of Vella Lavella on 7 October. At the Battle of Empress Augusta Bay, after being damaged in a collision, Hatsukaze was sunk by the destroyers USS Charles Ausburne, Claxton, Dyson, Stanly, and Spence. A small piece of Hatsukaze's bow returned to Rabaul lodged into the heavy cruiser Myōkō, later to be removed and scrapped.

In 1944, the height of the Kagerō class was over. They only scored one victory at the Battle off Samar, 25 October 1944, when Yukikaze, Isokaze, Urakaze, and Nowaki helped to finish off the already crippled destroyer USS Johnston. In exchange, loss after loss piled up. On 10 January, Amatsukaze was damaged beyond repair when she was blown in half by a torpedo fired from the submarine USS Redfin. The forward half rapidly sank while the rear half stayed afloat and was towed to Singapore. On 18 February, Maikaze was disabled by dive bombers from USS Enterprise and finished off by gunfire from the battleship USS New Jersey, the heavy cruisers USS New Orleans and Minneapolis, and the destroyers USS Bradford, Burns, Charrette, and Izard, while Nowaki escaped with straddle damage. In April, Redfin also torpedoed and sank Akigumo, while later that June, Tanikaze was torpedoed and sunk by the submarine USS Harder, before the rest of the class saw escorting duties during the Battle of the Philippine Sea. In October, the remaining six functional ships of the class took part in the Battle of Leyte Gulf. Hamakaze was damaged by air attacks on the 24th and forced to withdraw from the battle, while Shiranui escaped the Battle of the Surigao Strait without damage. Yukikaze, Isokaze, Urakaze, and Nowaki fought Taffy 3 at the Battle off Samar, firing torpedoes at the US escort carriers without obtaining a hit before as stated helping to sink Johnston. However, as the Japanese ships attempted to escape, Nowaki was sunk with all hands, crippled by gunfire from US cruisers and finished off by the destroyer USS Owen, while Shiranui was sunk with all hands by aircraft from USS Enterprise. With the American invasion of the Philippines becoming increasingly successful, the remaining ships retreated to mainland Japan, during which Urakaze was sunk with all hands by the submarine USS Sealion in the same attack that sank the battleship Kongō. Upon returning to Japan, Yukikaze, Isokaze, and Hamakaze escorted the newly completed aircraft carrier Shinano, during which she was torpedoed and sunk by the submarine USS Archerfish.

Only four ships of the class were still around by 1945, of which three were functional. Throughout March and April, the Japanese command repeatedly hatched plans to deliver the still un-repaired Amatsukaze to mainland Japan, but each plan failed, culminating on 6 April when Amatsukaze was finally destroyed by land-based aircraft. The same day of Amatsukaze's destruction, Yukikaze, Isokaze, and Hamakaze departed Japan as escorts for the battleship Yamato during Operation Ten-Go. En route the next day, the force was attack by nearly 400 carrier aircraft. Alongside the sinking of Yamato, Hamakaze was sunk by planes from the aircraft carrier USS Bunker Hill and the light carrier USS San Jacinto, while Isokaze was fatally damaged by bombers from the light carriers USS Bataan and USS Belleau Wood, resulting in Yukikaze scuttling the last of her sister ships, leaving her as the last Kagerō-class destroyer still afloat. For the rest of the war, Yukikaze saw a series of coastal patrol duties, and by the end of the war, due to fuel shortages, was demoted to an anti-aircraft platform, surviving several air attacks by US carriers and for Emperor Hirohito to announce plans for an unconditional surrender on 15 August 1945, becoming one of only a handful of Japanese destroyers to survive the war.

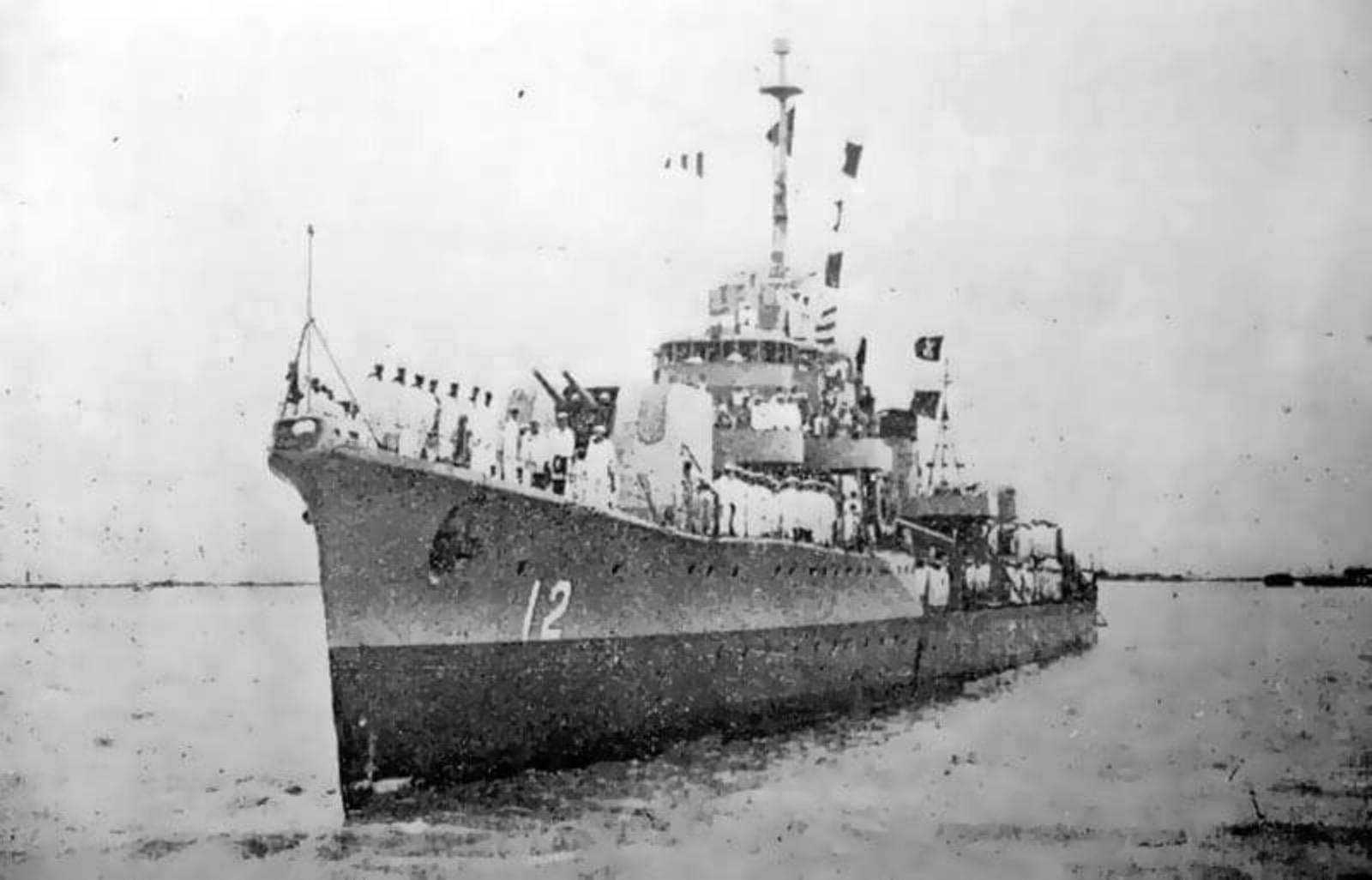
The former Yukikaze in Taiwanese service, 1952

Yukikaze was the only ship of the Kagerō class to survive the war, and was used to transport Japanese prisoners of war back to their homeland, and was heavily inspected post war by US Navy officials for documentation, before being transferred to the Taiwanese Navy in 1947. During her service as ROCS Dan Yang, the former Yukikaze took part in two shore bombardment missions and captured two oil tankers and a cargo ship, alongside having over 50,000 overseas Chinese civilians tour the destroyer during a visit to Manila. The former Yukikaze was eventually decommissioned in 1966 after being damaged in a storm, and finally sold for scrapping material in 1970. Yukikaze's rudder and one of her propellers are preserved in museums.

== Gallery ==
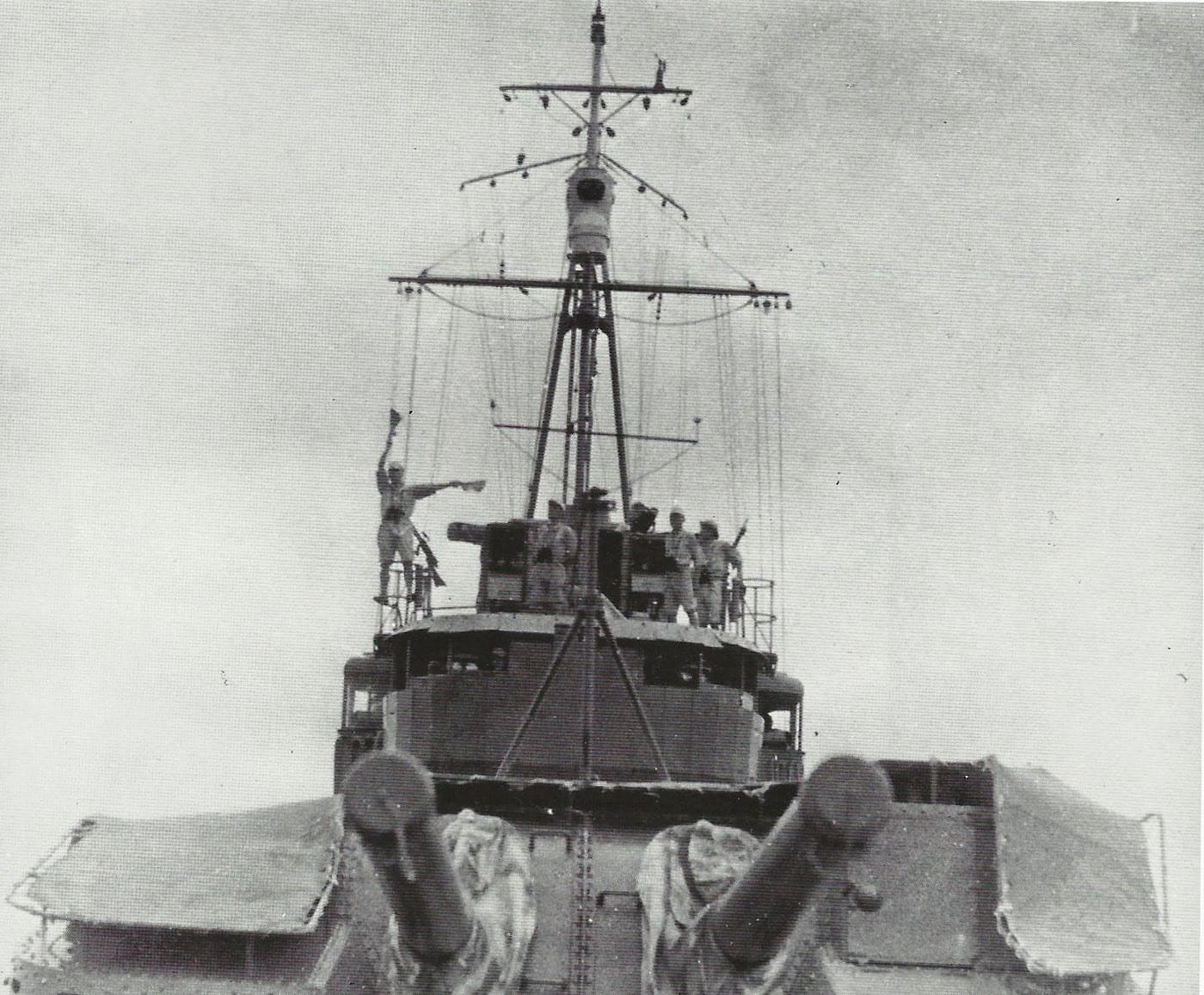
Kagerō

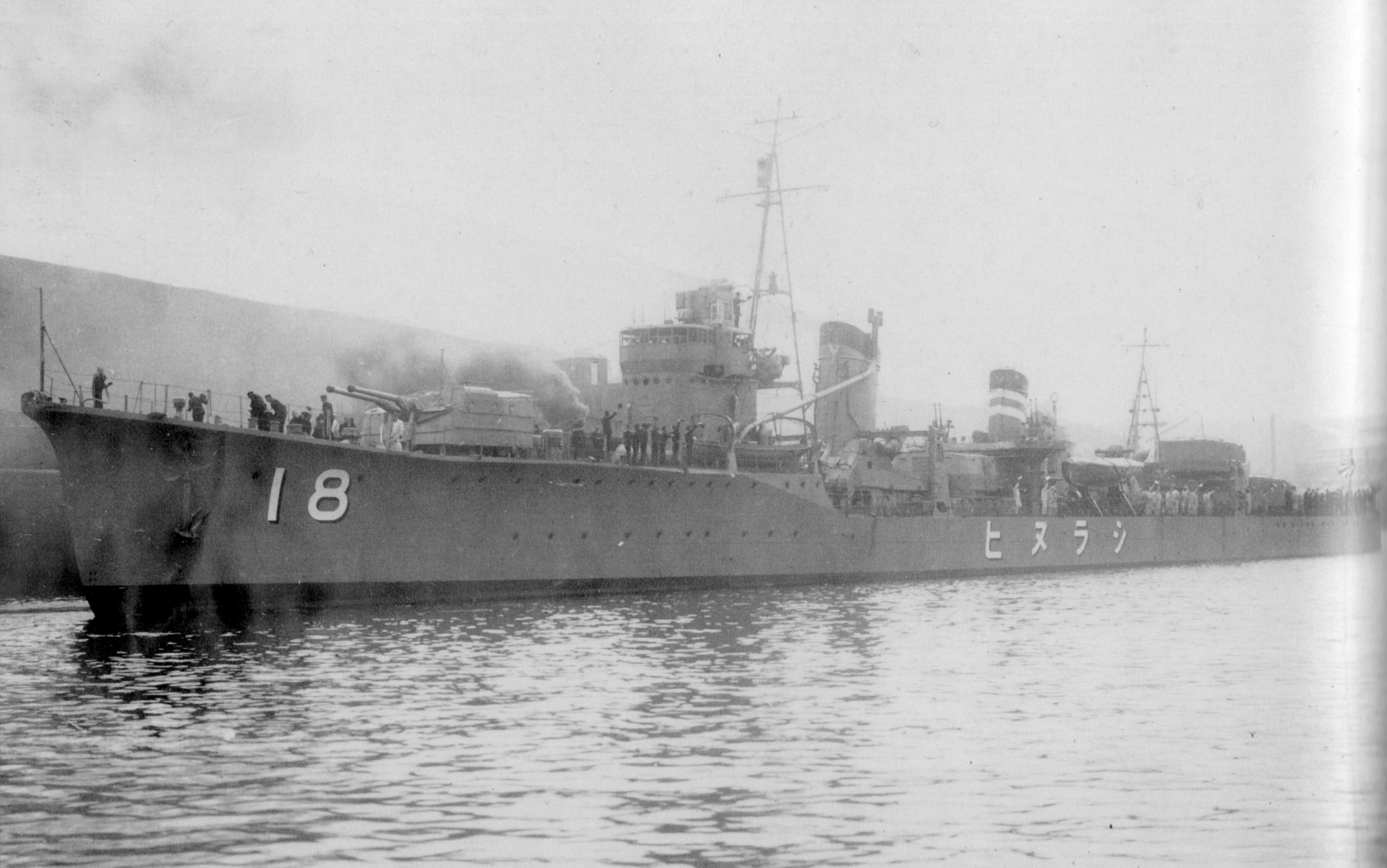
Shiranui

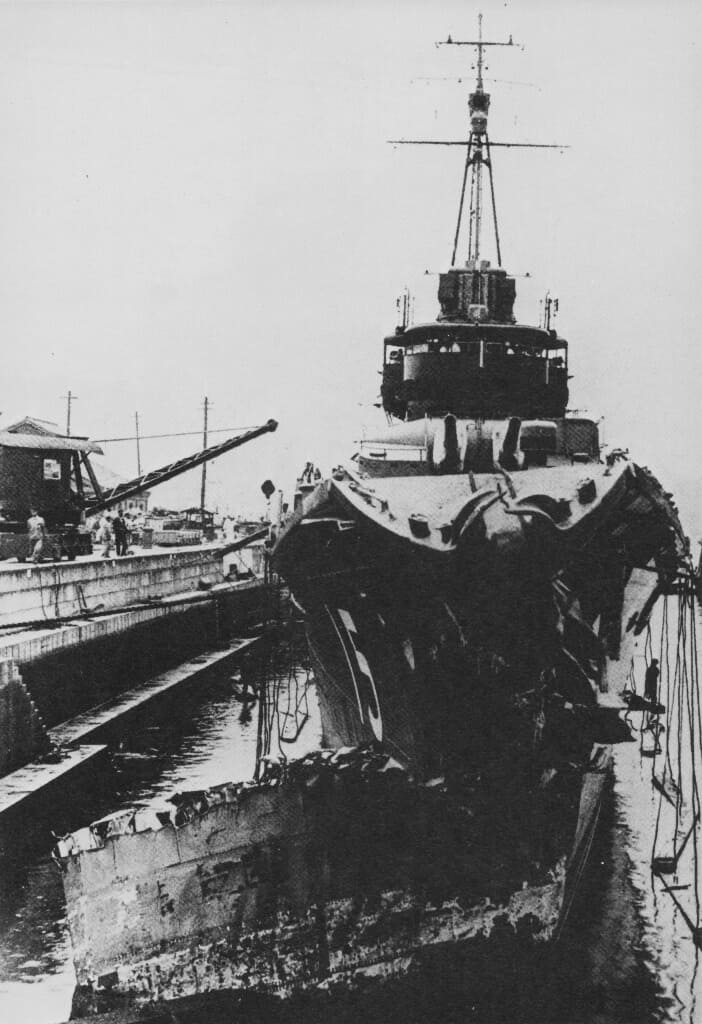
Kuroshio

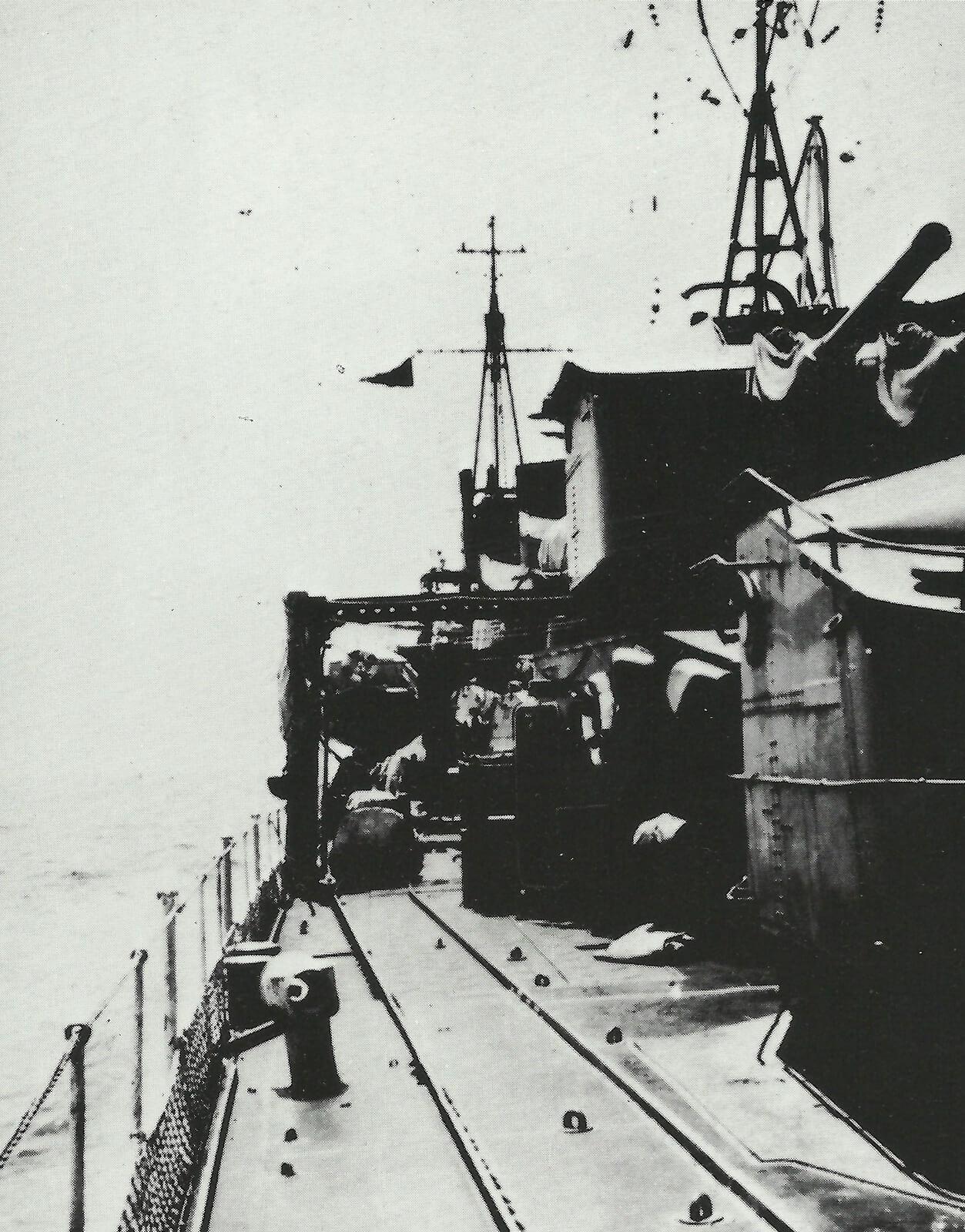
Oyashio

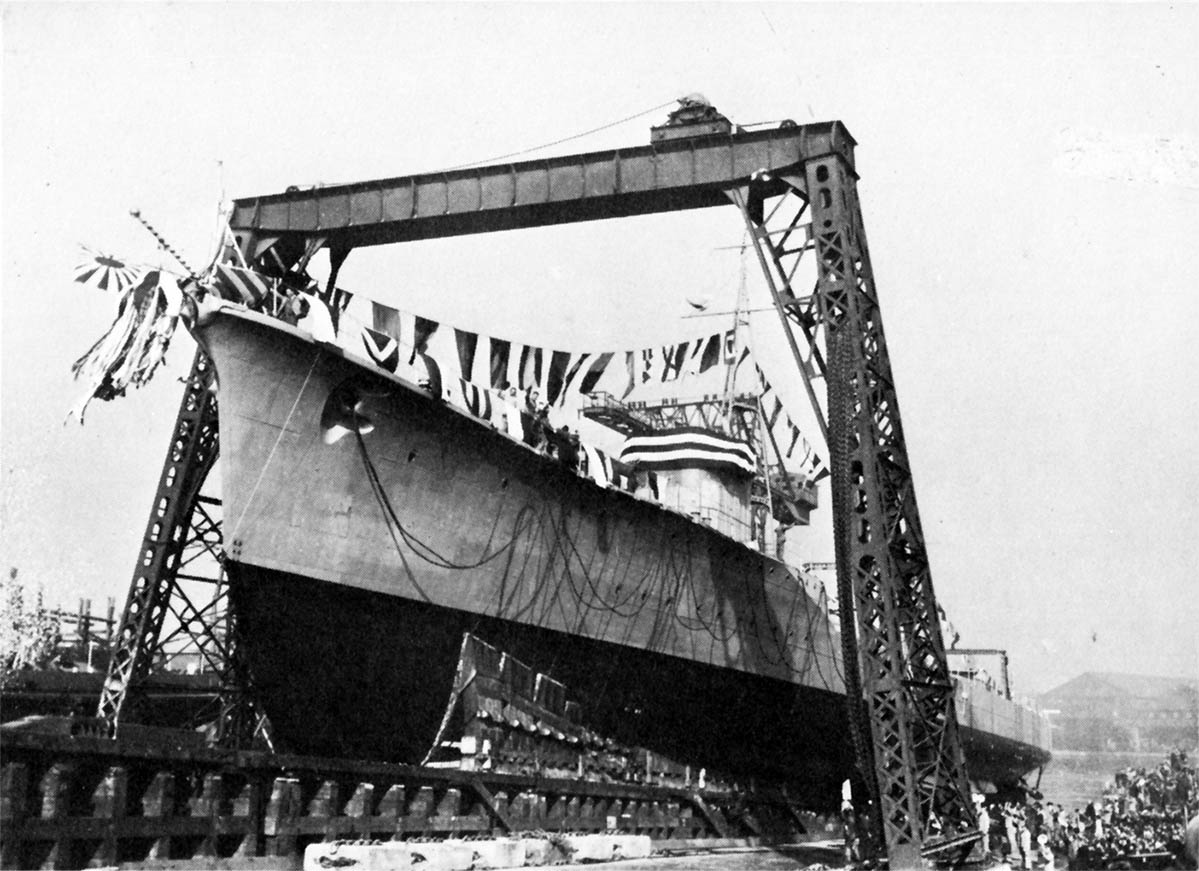
Natsushio

Hatsukaze (right)

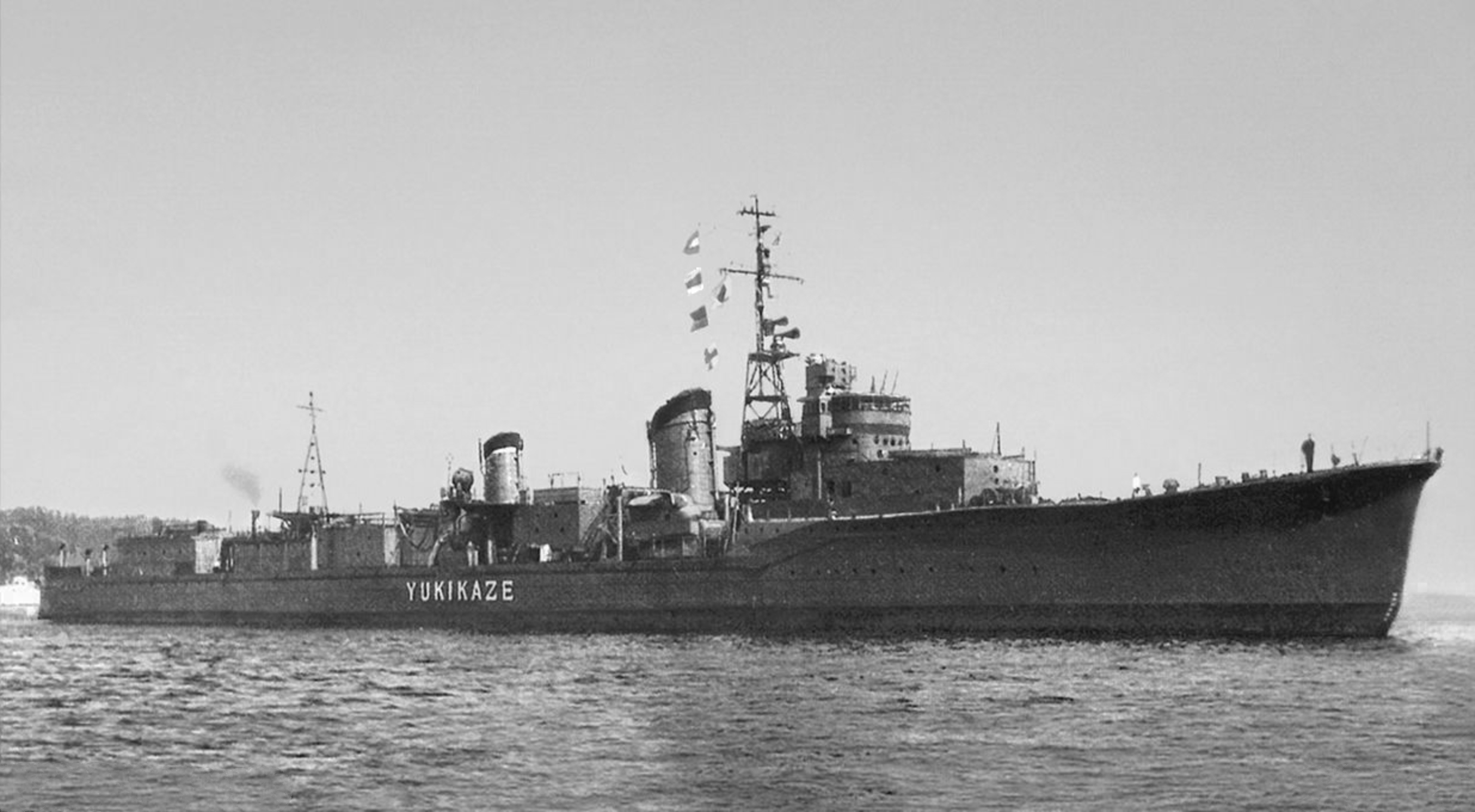
Yukikaze

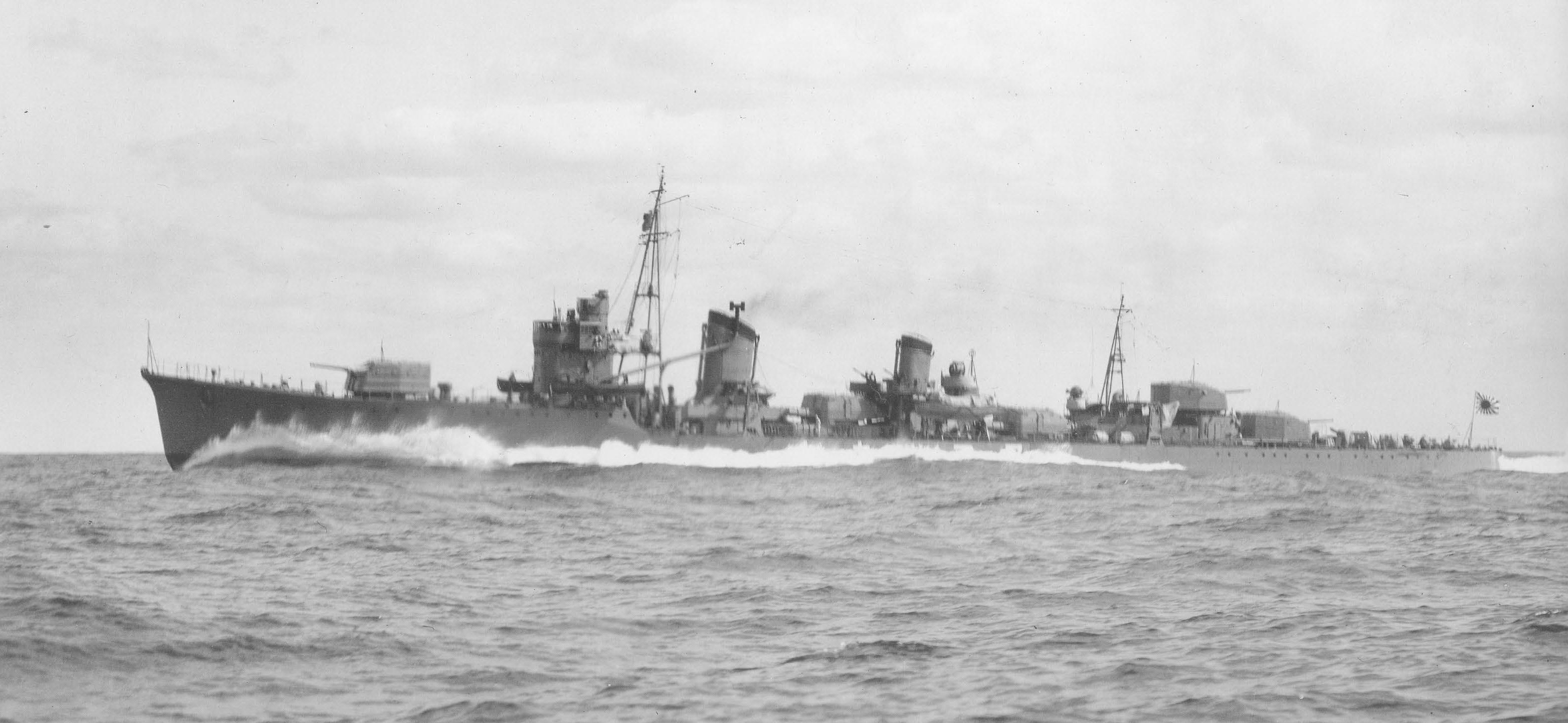
Amatsukaze

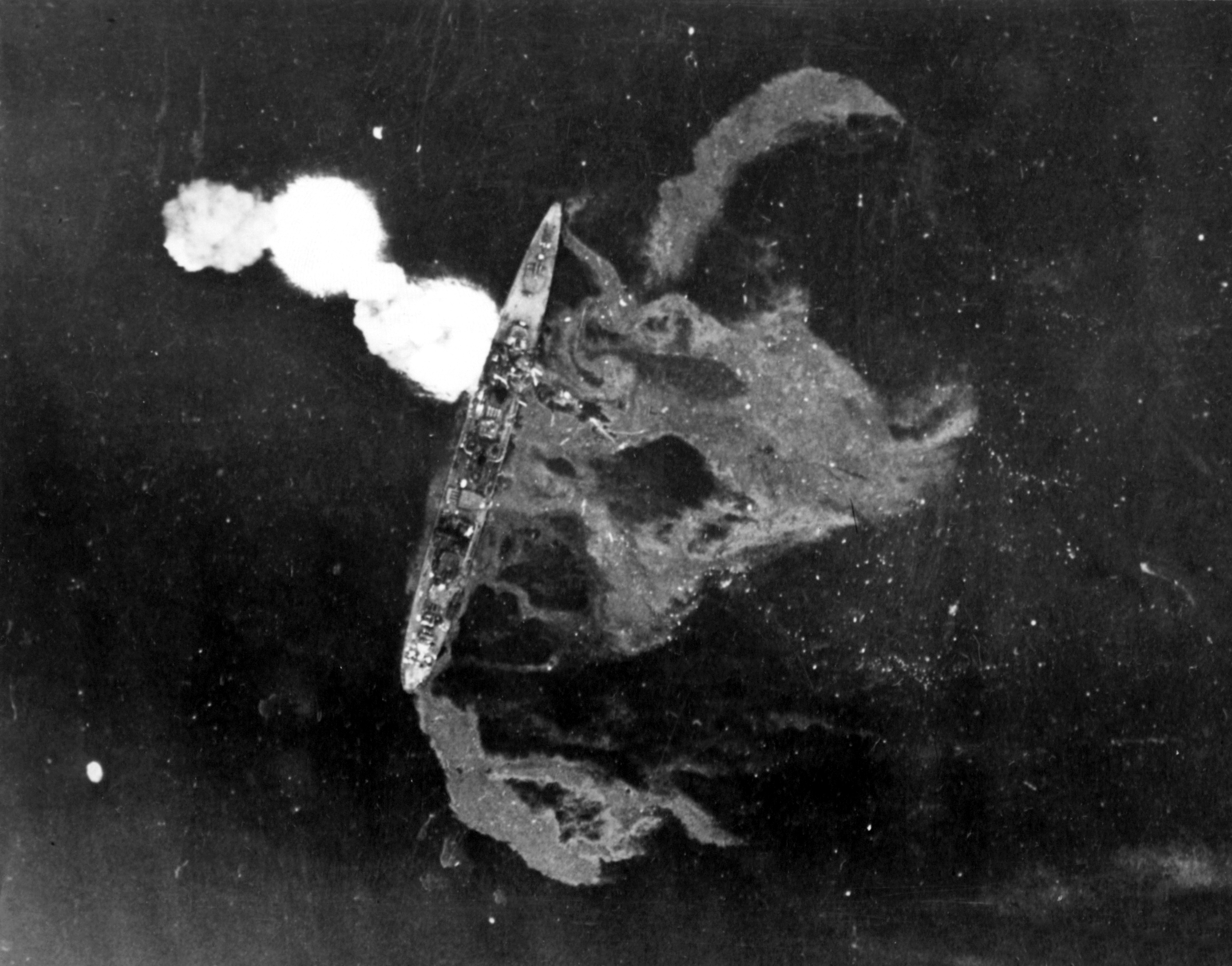
Tokitsukaze

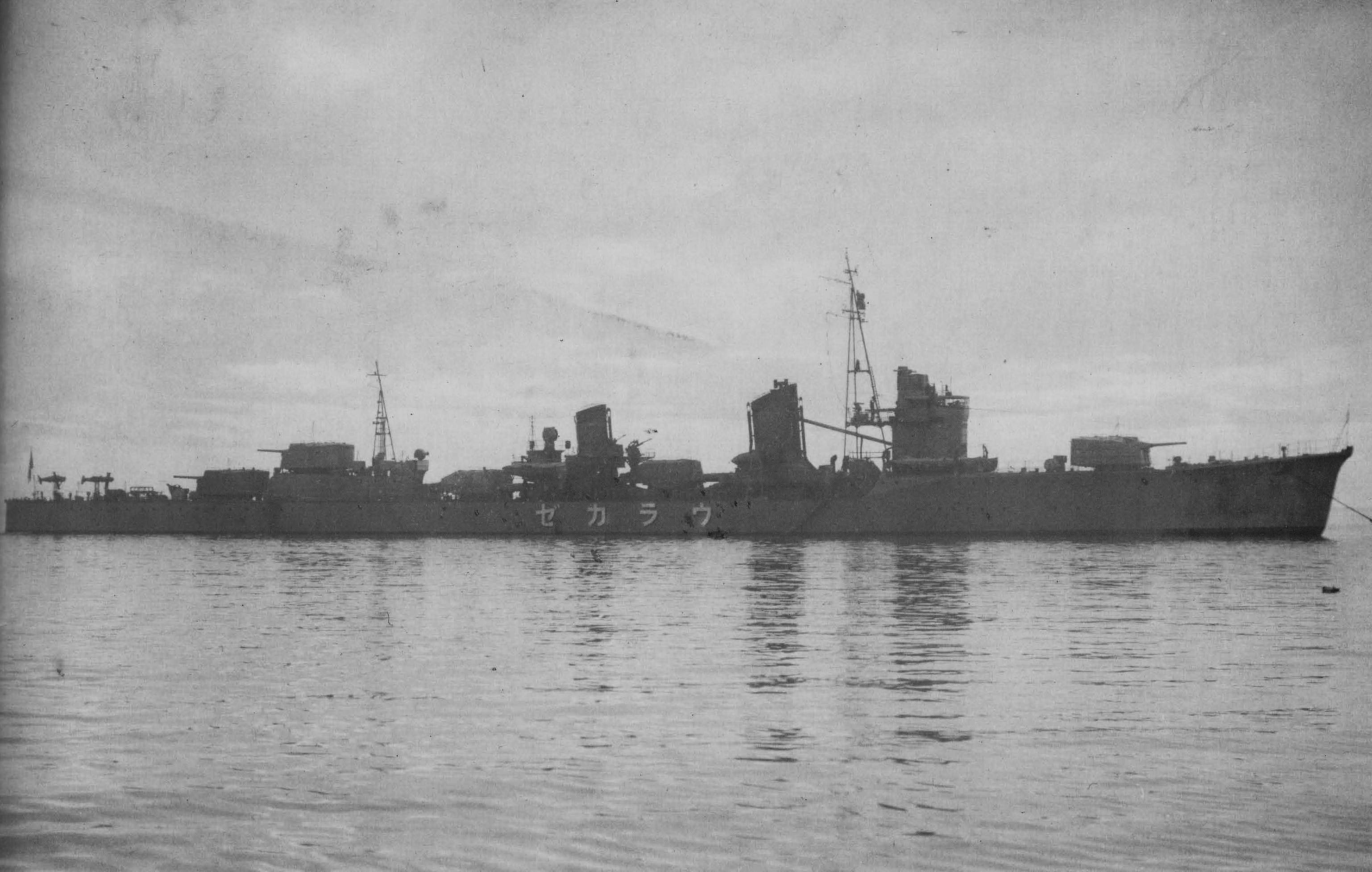
Urakaze

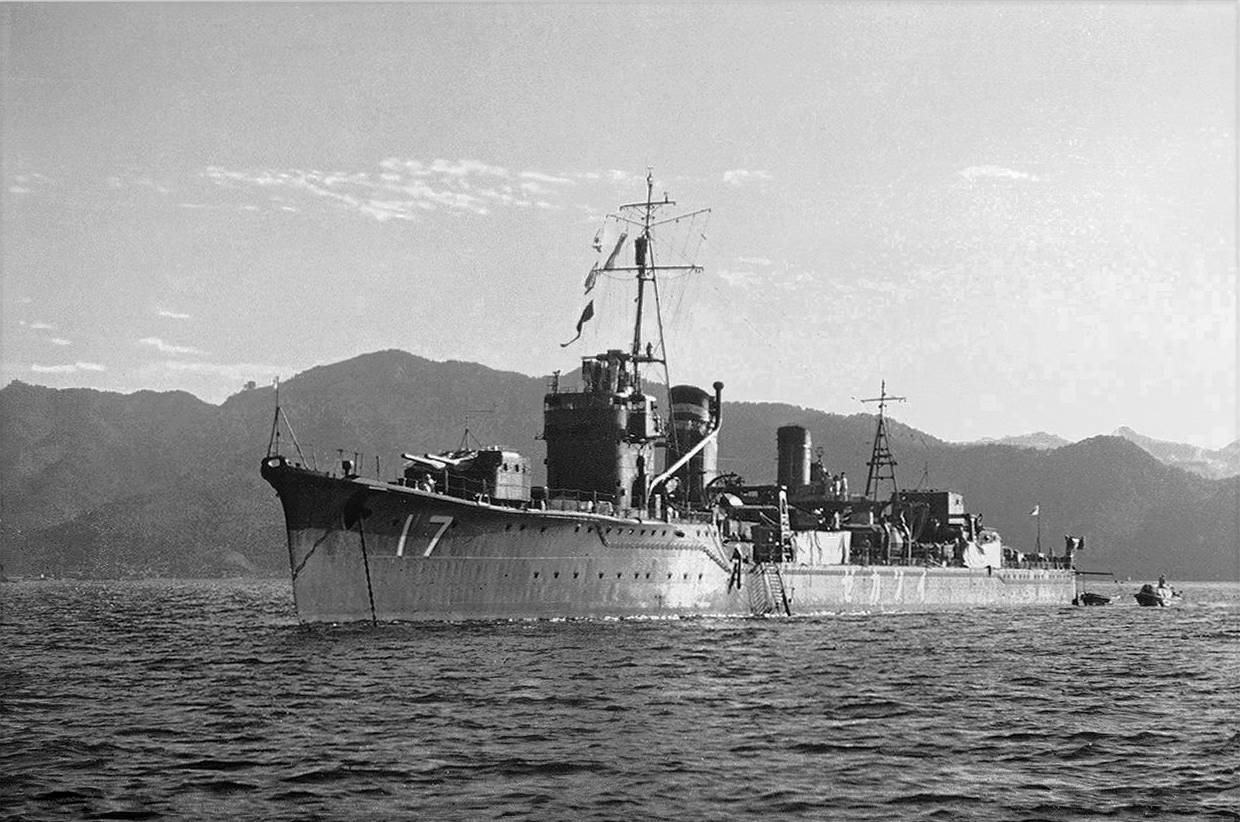
Isokaze

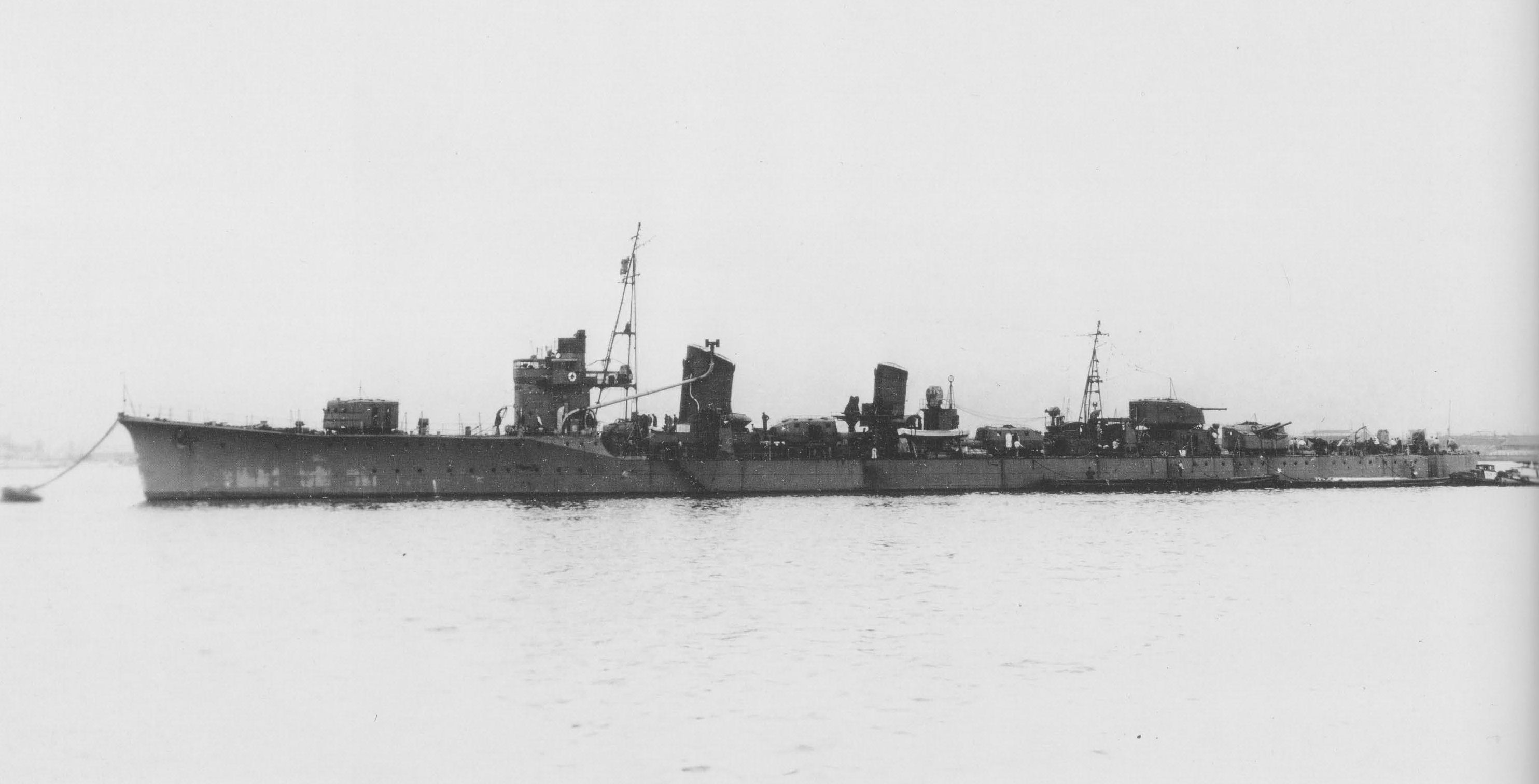
Tanikaze

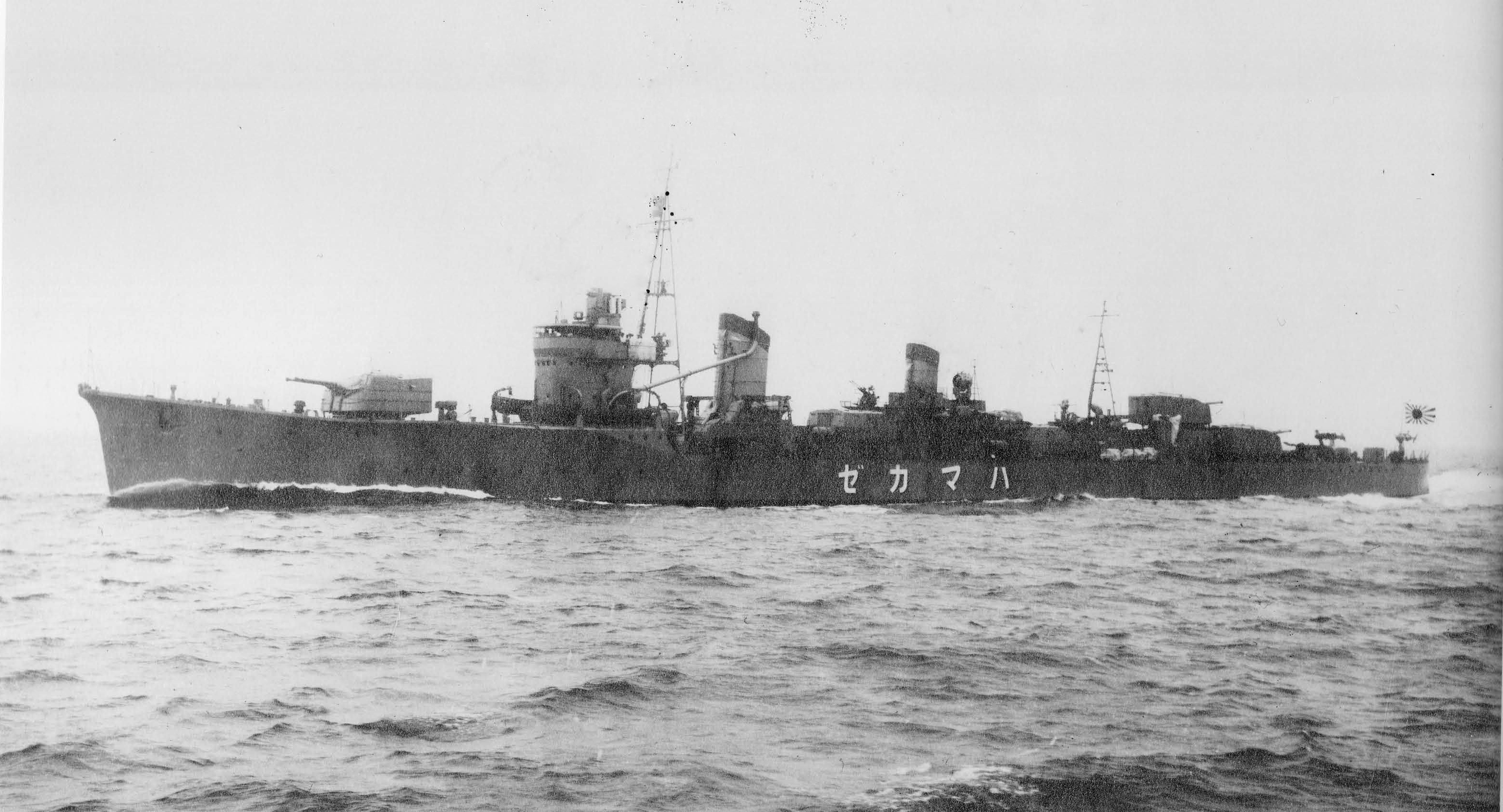
Hamakaze

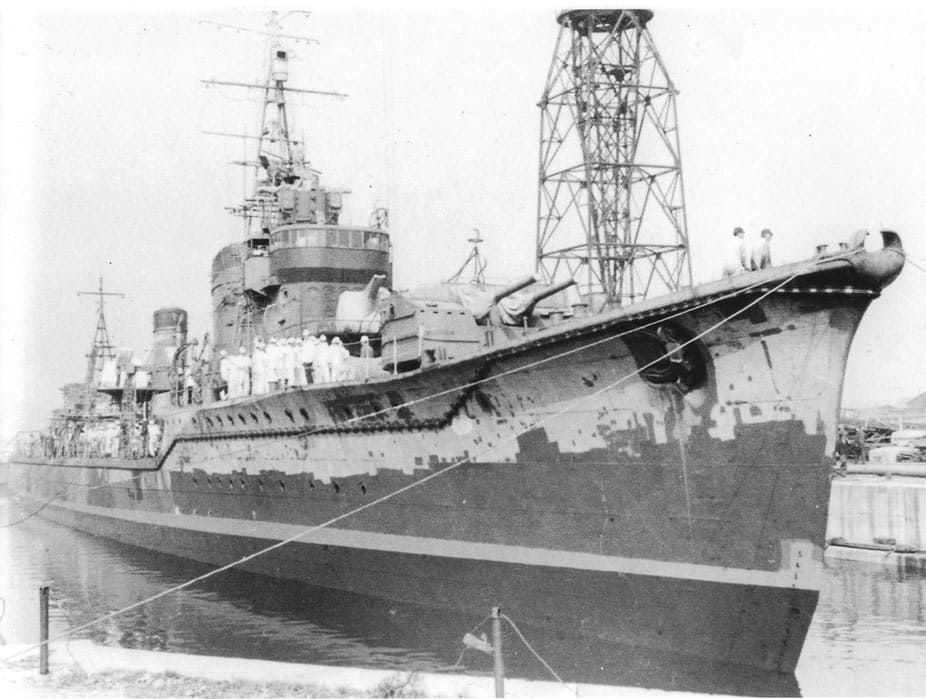
Nowaki

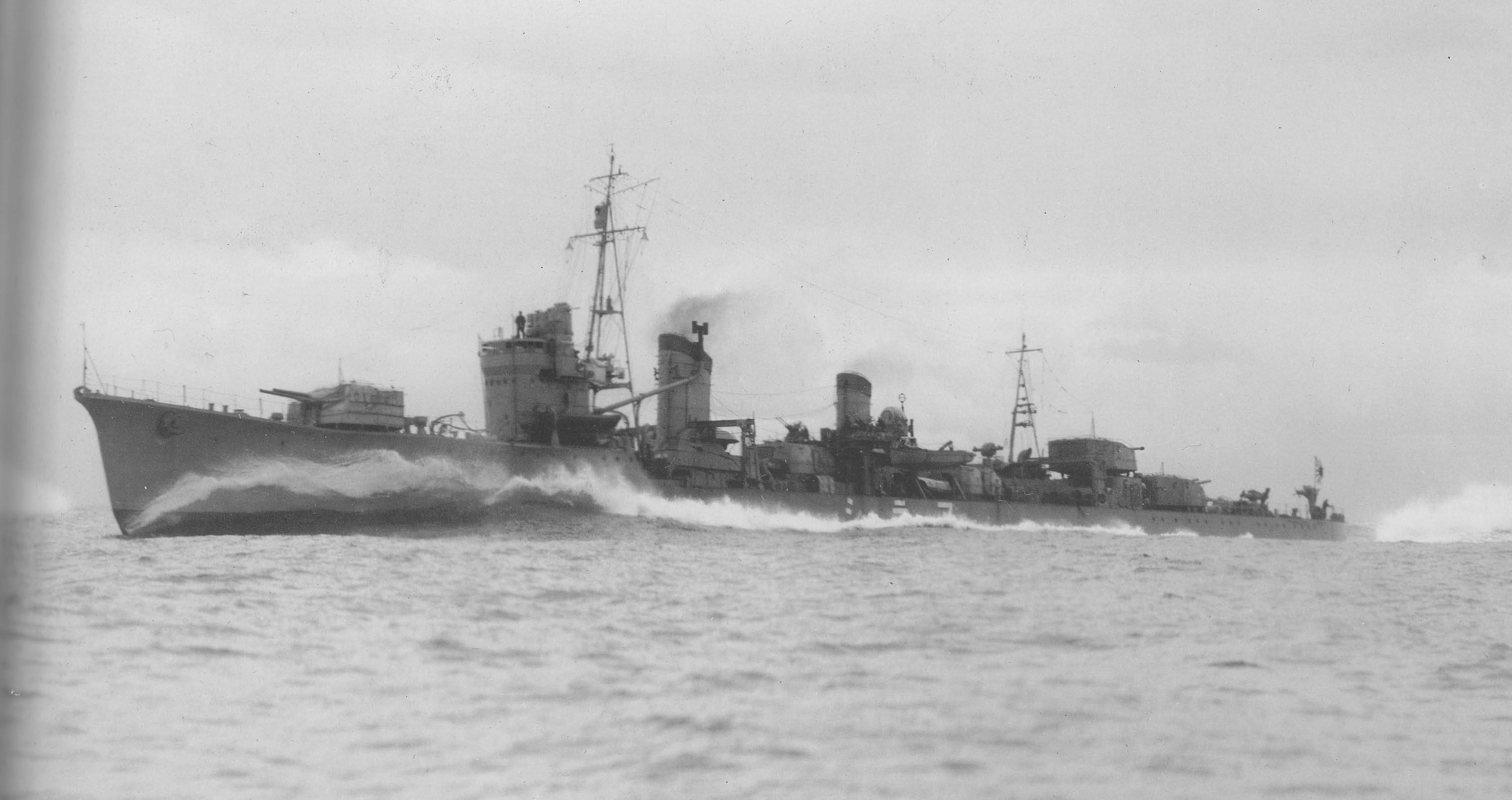
Arashi

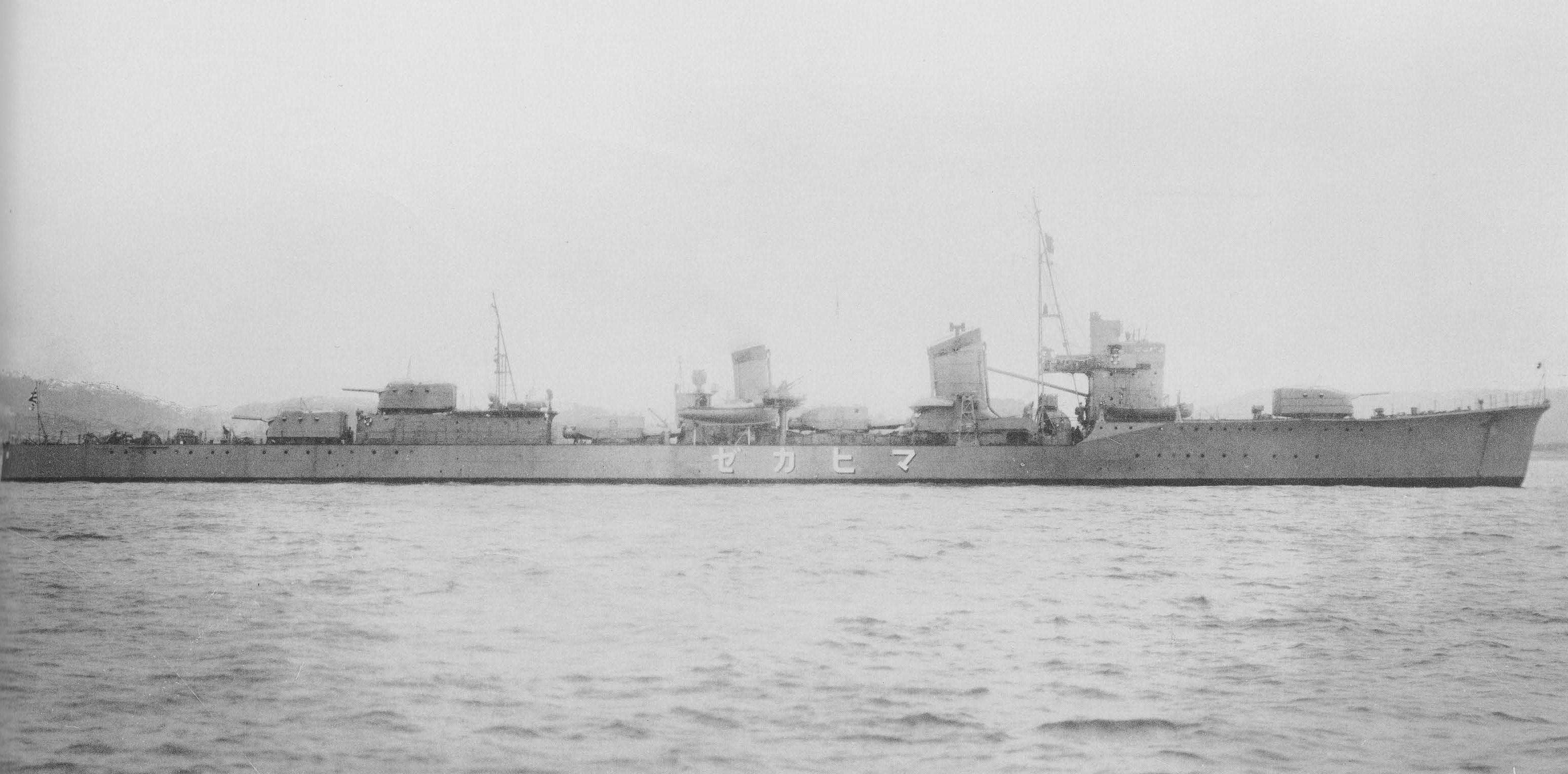
Maikaze

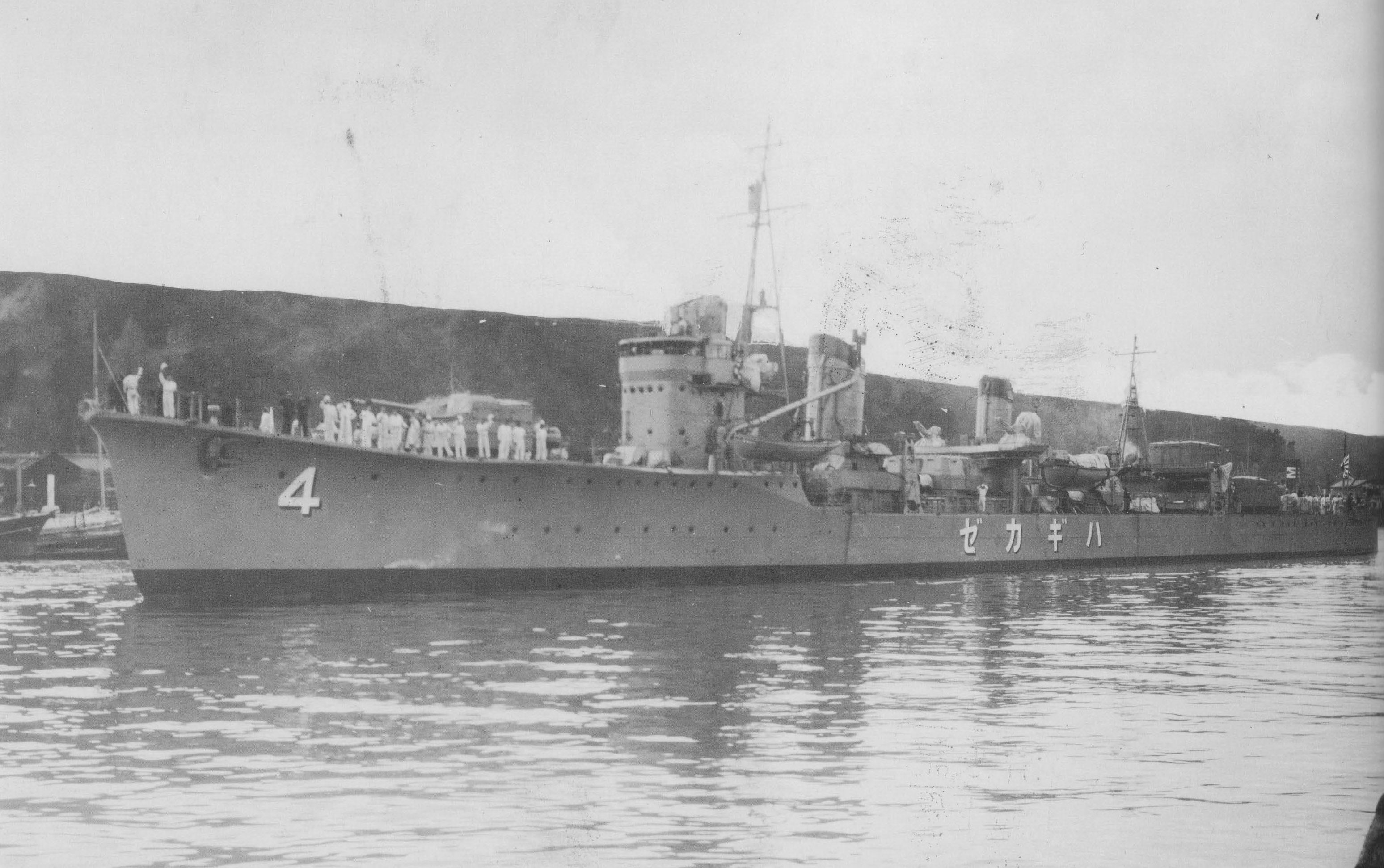
Hagikaze

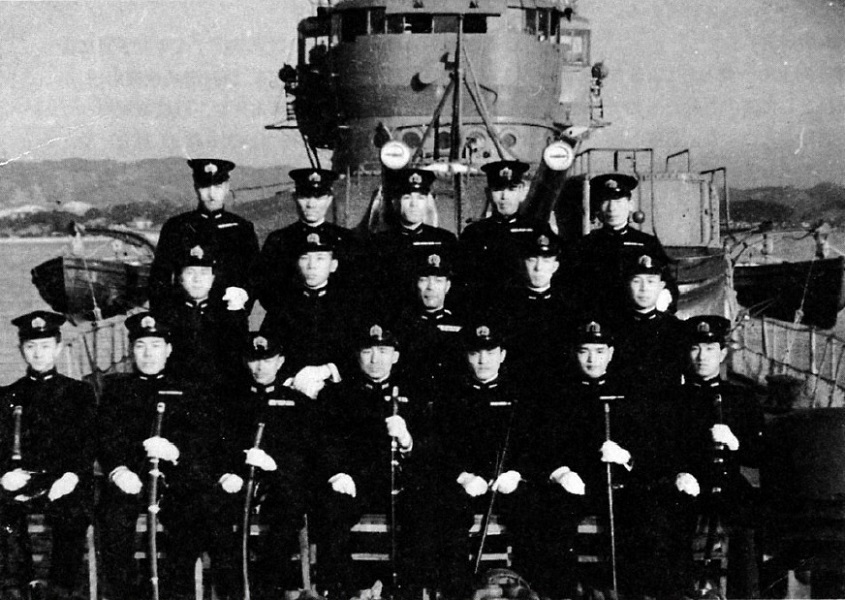
Akigumo

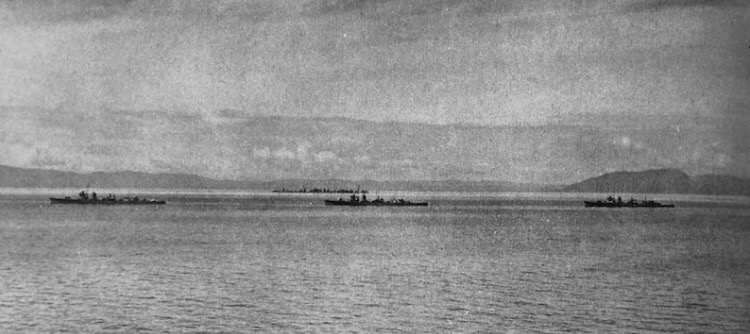
Hamakaze, Tanikaze, and Isokaze (L to R)

Urakaze, Hamakaze, and Yukikaze (R to L)

Not pictured: Hayashio
