= Japanese destroyer Hayashio =

Kagerō-class destroyer

History

Empire of Japan
- Name: Hayashio
- Builder: Uraga Dock Company
- Laid down: 30 June 1938
- Launched: 19 April 1939
- Completed: 31 August 1940
- Stricken: 24 December 1942
- Fate: Sunk in action, 24 November 1942

General characteristics
- Class & type: Kagerō-class destroyer
- Displacement: 2,033 long tons (2,066 t) standard
- Length: 118.5 m (388 ft 9 in)
- Beam: 10.8 m (35 ft 5 in)
- Draft: 3.8 m (12 ft 6 in)
- Propulsion: 3 × Kampon water tube boilers; 2 × Kanpon impulse turbines; 2 × shafts, 52,000 shp (39 MW)
- Speed: 35.5 knots (40.9 mph; 65.7 km/h)
- Range: 5,000 NM at 18 knots (21 mph; 33 km/h)
- Complement: 239
- Armament: (1939); 6 × 12.7 cm/50 Type 3 DP guns; 2 × Type 96 25 mm AA guns; 8 × 610 mm (24 in) torpedo tubes; 18 depth charges; 2 × paravanes; (1943); 6 × 12.7 cm/50 Type 3 DP guns; 8 × Type 96 25 mm AA guns; 8 × 610 mm (24 in) torpedo tubes; 18 depth charges

Hayashio (早潮, lit. "Swift Tide") was the fifth vessel to be commissioned in the 19-vessel Kagerō-class destroyers built for the Imperial Japanese Navy in the late-1930s under the Circle Three Supplementary Naval Expansion Program (Maru San Keikaku).

== Background ==
The Kagerō-class destroyers were outwardly almost identical to the preceding light cruiser-sized Asashio class, with improvements made by Japanese naval architects to improve stability and to take advantage of Japan's lead in torpedo technology. They were designed to accompany the Japanese main striking force and in both day and night attacks against the United States Navy as it advanced across the Pacific Ocean, according to Japanese naval strategic projections. Despite being one of the most powerful classes of destroyers in the world at the time of their completion, only one survived the Pacific War.

Hayashio, built at the Uraga Dock Company, was laid down on 30 June 1938, launched on 19 April 1939 and commissioned on 31 August 1940.

== Operational history ==
At the time of the attack on Pearl Harbor, Hayashio, was assigned to Destroyer Division 15 (Desdiv 15), and a member of Destroyer Squadron 2 (Desron 2) of the IJN 2nd Fleet, and had deployed from Palau, as part of the escort for the aircraft carrier Ryūjō in the invasion of the southern Philippines and minelayer Yaeyama.

In early 1942, Hayashio participated in the invasion of the Netherlands East Indies, escorting the invasion forces for Menado, Kendari and Ambon in January, and the invasion forces for Makassar, Timor and Java in February. At the end of March, she returned with Kaga from Staring-baai in Sulawesi to Sasebo.

At the end of April, Hayashio deployed from Kure to assist in the occupation of the Cagayan Islands near Palawan in early May, and then returned with the damaged carrier Shōkaku from Manila to Kure on 17 May. In early June, Hayashio deployed from Saipan as part of the troopship escort for the Battle of Midway.

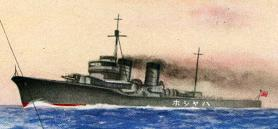
Hayashio in artwork

In mid-June, Hayashio was assigned as escort for cruisers in projected further Indian Ocean raids, but the operation was cancelled by the time she reached Mergui in Burma, and she was reassigned as escort for the cruisers Kumano and Suzuya to Balikpapan and the Solomon Islands. During the Battle of the Eastern Solomons of 24 August she was part of Admiral Kondō's Advance Force, but was not in combat. During September, Hayashio was used for patrols between Truk and Guadalcanal, and in October began operations as a "Tokyo Express" high speed troop transport to Guadalcanal. These operations continued to early-February 1943. During the Battle of the Santa Cruz Islands on 26 October, she was assigned to the escort if the aircraft carrier Jun'yō, returning after the battle with cruisers Maya and Suzuya to Shortland Island. During the Naval Battle of Guadalcanal on 13–15 November, Hayashio served as flagship of the troop convoy escorts. After the battle, she returned with Maya, Suzuya and Tenryū to Kavieng.

On 24 November 1942, while on a transport run to Lae, Hayashio was attacked by USAAF bombers (one of which, a B-17F with c/n 41-24521, claimed a direct hit to her forward turret's port side) and caught fire. Attempts to quench the fires stopped after the magazine exploded, and Cdr Kiyoshi Kaneda gave the order to abandon ship. After removing the survivors, she was scuttled by a torpedo launched by the destroyer Shiratsuyu, in Guna Bay, Huon Gulf (07°0′S 147°30′E). Hayashio was removed from the navy list on 24 December 1942.

== See also ==
- List of ships of the Imperial Japanese Navy

== Books ==
- Brown, David (1990). Warship Losses of World War Two. Naval Institute Press. ISBN 1-55750-914-X.
- D'Albas, Andrieu (1965). Death of a Navy: Japanese Naval Action in World War II. Devin-Adair Pub. ISBN 0-8159-5302-X.
- Evans, David (1979). Kaigun: Strategy, Tactics, and Technology in the Imperial Japanese Navy, 1887–1941. US Naval Institute Press. ISBN 0-87021-192-7.
- Roger Chesneau, ed. (1980). Conway's All the World's Fighting Ships 1922–1946. Grenwitch: Conway Maritime Press. ISBN 0-85177-146-7.
- Howarth, Stephen (1983). The Fighting Ships of the Rising Sun: The Drama of the Imperial Japanese Navy, 1895–1945. Atheneum. ISBN 0-689-11402-8.
- Jentsura, Hansgeorg (1976). Warships of the Imperial Japanese Navy, 1869–1945. US Naval Institute Press. ISBN 0-87021-893-X.
- Watts, A.J. (1966). Japanese warships of World War II. Ian Allan. ISBN 0711002150.
- Whitley, M. J. (1988). Destroyers of World War 2. Cassell Publishing. ISBN 1-85409-521-8.
