= Japanese destroyer Natsushio =

Kagerō-class destroyer

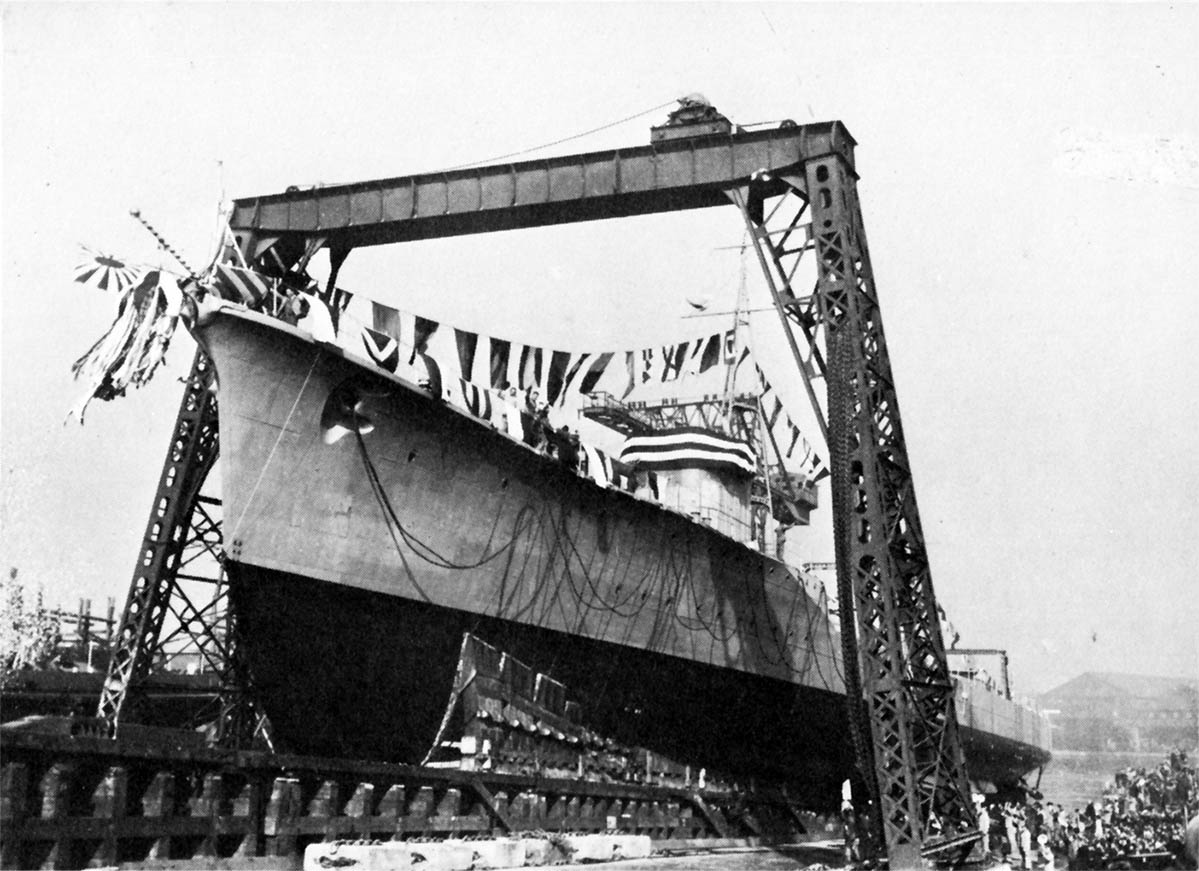
- Launching of Natsushio, 23 February 1939

History

Empire of Japan
- Name: Natsushio
- Builder: Fujinagata Shipyards, Osaka
- Laid down: 9 December 1937
- Launched: 23 February 1939
- Completed: 31 August 1940
- Stricken: 28 February 1942
- Fate: Torpedoed and sunk, 9 February 1942

General characteristics
- Class & type: Kagerō-class destroyer
- Displacement: 2,033 long tons (2,066 t) standard
- Length: 118.5 m (388 ft 9 in)
- Beam: 10.8 m (35 ft 5 in)
- Draft: 3.8 m (12 ft 6 in)
- Propulsion: 3 × Kampon water tube boilers; 2 × Kanpon impulse turbines; 2 × shafts, 52,000 shp (39 MW)
- Speed: 35.5 knots (40.9 mph; 65.7 km/h)
- Range: 5,000 NM at 18 knots (21 mph; 33 km/h)
- Complement: 239
- Armament: 6 × 12.7 cm/50 Type 3 DP guns; 2 × Type 96 25 mm AA guns; 8 × 610 mm (24 in) torpedo tubes; 18 depth charges; 2 × paravanes

Natsushio (夏潮, lit. "Summer Tide") was the sixth vessel to be commissioned in the 19-vessel Kagerō-class destroyers built for the Imperial Japanese Navy in the late-1930s under the Circle Three Supplementary Naval Expansion Program (Maru San Keikaku).

== Background ==
The Kagerō-class destroyers were outwardly almost identical to the preceding light cruiser-sized Asashio class, with improvements made by Japanese naval architects to improve stability and to take advantage of Japan's lead in torpedo technology. They were designed to accompany the Japanese main striking force and in both day and night attacks against the United States Navy as it advanced across the Pacific Ocean, according to Japanese naval strategic projections. Despite being one of the most powerful classes of destroyers in the world at the time of their completion, only one survived the Pacific War.

Natsushio, built at the Fujinagata Shipyards, was laid down on 9 December 1937, launched on 23 February 1939 and commissioned on 31 August 1940.

== Operational history ==
At 1800 hours on 23 June 1941, Natsushio collided with the destroyers Kuroshio and Minegumo in Bungo Channel.

At the time of the attack on Pearl Harbor, Natsushio, was assigned to Destroyer Division 15 (Desdiv 15), and a member of Destroyer Squadron 2 (Desron 2) of the IJN 2nd Fleet, and had deployed from Palau, as part of the escort for the aircraft carrier Ryūjō in the invasion of the southern Philippines and minelayer Yaeyama.

In early 1942, Natsushio participated in the invasion of the Netherlands East Indies, escorting the invasion forces for Menado, Kendari and Ambon in January. During the invasion of Makassar on 8–9 February, Natsushio was torpedoed by the United States Navy submarine USS S-37 and sank approximately 22 miles (35 km) south of Makassar at coordinates (05°10′S 119°24′E). Ten crewmen were killed in the attack, and the survivors were rescued by her sister ship Kuroshio. Natsushio was removed from the navy list on 28 February 1942. She was the first Japanese destroyer to fall victim to U.S. submarines during the war, the first of her class to be sunk and the only Kagero-class destroyer to not partake in the Battle of Midway.

== See also ==
- List of ships of the Imperial Japanese Navy

== Books ==
- Brown, David (1990). Warship Losses of World War Two. Naval Institute Press. ISBN 1-55750-914-X.
- D'Albas, Andrieu (1965). Death of a Navy: Japanese Naval Action in World War II. Devin-Adair Pub. ISBN 0-8159-5302-X.
- Evans, David (1979). Kaigun: Strategy, Tactics, and Technology in the Imperial Japanese Navy, 1887–1941. US Naval Institute Press. ISBN 0-87021-192-7.
- Roger Chesneau, ed. (1980). Conway's All the World's Fighting Ships 1922–1946. Grenwitch: Conway Maritime Press. ISBN 0-85177-146-7.
- Howarth, Stephen (1983). The Fighting Ships of the Rising Sun: The Drama of the Imperial Japanese Navy, 1895–1945. Atheneum. ISBN 0-689-11402-8.
- Jentsura, Hansgeorg (1976). Warships of the Imperial Japanese Navy, 1869–1945. US Naval Institute Press. ISBN 0-87021-893-X.
- Watts, A.J. (1966). Japanese warships of World War II. Ian Allan. ISBN 0711002150.
- Whitley, M. J. (1988). Destroyers of World War 2. Cassell Publishing. ISBN 1-85409-521-8.
