= USS S-37 =

Submarine of the United States

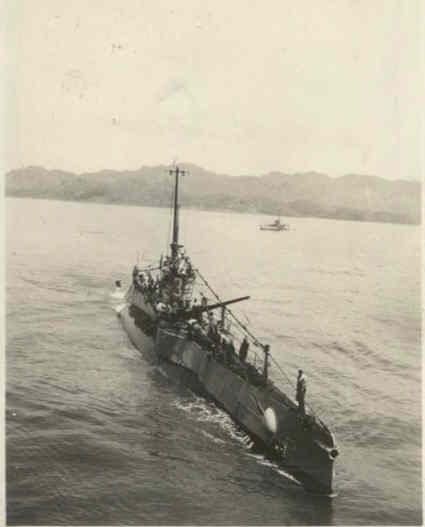
- USS S-37

History

United States
- Name: USS S-37
- Builder: Union Iron Works, San Francisco, California
- Laid down: 12 December 1918
- Launched: 20 June 1919
- Sponsored by: Miss Mildred Bulger
- Commissioned: 16 July 1923
- Decommissioned: 6 February 1945
- Fate: Broke tow and sank 20 February 1945
- Stricken: 23 February 1945

General characteristics
- Class & type: S-class submarine
- Displacement: 854 long tons (868 t) surfaced; 1,062 long tons (1,079 t) submerged
- Length: 211 ft (64 m) w/l; 219 ft 3 in (66.83 m) o/a
- Beam: 20 ft 9 in (6.32 m)
- Draft: 16 ft (4.9 m)
- Propulsion: NLSE diesels, 1,200 hp (890 kW); General Electric motors, 1,500 hp (1,100 kW); 120 cell Exide battery; 2 shafts
- Speed: 14.5 knots (16.7 mph; 26.9 km/h) surfaced; 11 kn (13 mph; 20 km/h) submerged
- Range: 168 tons oil fuel
- Complement: 42 officers and men
- Armament: 1 × 4 in (100 mm)/50 caliber deck gun; 4 × 21-inch (533 mm) forward torpedo tubes; 12 torpedoes

Service record
- Part of: United States Asiatic Fleet; United States Pacific Fleet
- Victories: Natsushio
- Awards: 5 battle stars

USS S-37 (SS-142) was an S-class submarine of the United States Navy. Her keel was laid down on 12 December 1918, launched on 20 June 1919, and commissioned on 16 July 1923.

== Construction and commissioning ==
S-37's keel was laid down on 12 December 1918 by the Union Iron Works in San Francisco, California. She was launched on 20 June 1919, sponsored by Miss Mildred Bulger, and commissioned on 16 July 1923.

== Operational service ==
=== 1923 ===
After fitting out at Mare Island, S-37 departed San Francisco Bay at the end of July 1923 and joined Submarine Division (SubDiv) 17 at San Pedro, California, on 1 August 1923. During August, September, and into October 1923, she conducted exercises and tests off the Southern California coast.

On the afternoon of 10 October 1923, while recharging her batteries in the harbor at San Pedro, S-37 was rocked by an explosion in the after battery compartment. Two men were killed as dense black smoke and gas fumes filled the flame- and arc-lit room. Extensive material damage added to the difficulty of rescue operations, but three men were extracted from the compartment, one of whom died of his injuries before medical help arrived. Two of the rescuers were seriously injured.

Once it was determined no one remained alive in the compartment, the compartment was sealed to cut off the supply of oxygen to the fire. However, by 0500 on 11 October 1923, so much pressure had increased in the compartment it forced the main hatch open. The compartment was re-sealed for another five hours, but when it was opened at 1030, the fire reflashed. The crew shut the hatch again for another hour. At 1130, the compartment was successfully ventilated and cooled enough to allow the crew to enter safely. Temporary repairs were completed on 25 October 1923, and S-37 headed to Mare Island, California, for permanent repairs. On 19 December 1923, she returned to duty at San Pedro.

=== 1924–1941 ===
In 1924, S-37 moved south and, with her division, participated in Fleet Problems II, Fleet Problem III, and IV, which involved problems of fleet movements, conducted en route to the Gulf of Panama; Caribbean defenses and transit facilities of the Panama Canal; and movement from a main base to an advanced base, conducted in the Caribbean Sea. After completing Fleet Problem IV, her division remained in the Caribbean until early April 1924, when it again passed through the Panama Canal to return to the Pacific Ocean. Toward the end of April 1924, she returned to San Pedro, and, on 28 April 1924 she continued to Mare Island. There the submarines of her division, having been transferred to the United States Asiatic Fleet, prepared to cross the Pacific.

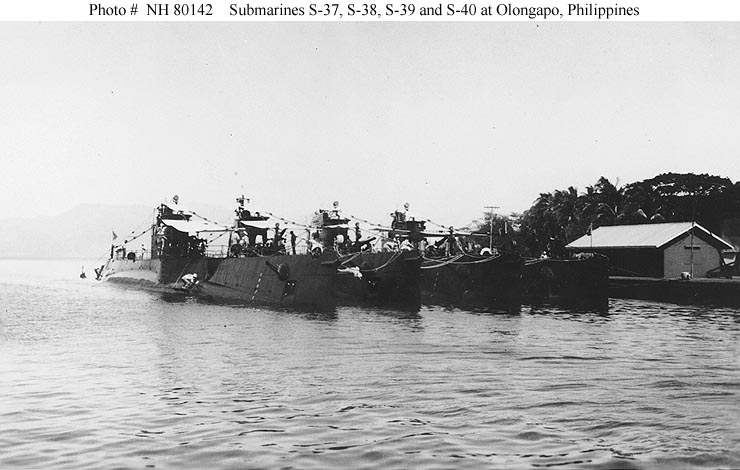

On 17 September 1924, SubDiv 17, accompanied by the submarine tender USS Canopus (AS-9), departed San Francisco. On 26 September 1924, the ships arrived at Pearl Harbor, Hawaii, and on 4 November 1924 they reached Manila Bay on the coast of Luzon in the Philippines. They operated from Cavite, Luzon, for 16 years. During most of that time, they worked as a division, spending the fall and winter months in the Philippines and deploying to the China coast for spring and summer exercises. During the late 1930s, however, hostilities increased in East Asia with the outbreak of the Second Sino-Japanese War in July 1937, and the Asiatic Fleet's S-boat schedule was altered to include more individual exercises and cruises. The submarines ranged throughout the Philippines and Netherlands East Indies, and they made shorter deployments to the China coast. In 1940, the China deployments ended, and the submarines intensified their exercises and patrols in the Philippines and participated in joint United States Army-U.S. Navy war games. In 1941, S-37 remained in the Philippines, operating in the Luzon area into the spring, in the Visayan Islands and Sulu Archipelago into the summer, and back in the Luzon area during the fall.

=== World War II ===
==== 1941 ====
On 8 December 1941 – which across the International Date Line in Hawaii was 7 December 1941, the day the Japanese attack on Pearl Harbor brought the United States into World War II – S-37 was in Manila Bay. With receipt of the news of the Japanese attack, S-37, commanded by James C. Dempsey, prepared for her first war patrol. On the night of 9 December 1941, she cleared the Corregidor outer minefield, moved into the Verde Island Passage, and took station at Puerta Galera, Mindoro, where she remained on lookout duty until 17 December 1941. She then returned to Manila, replenished and refueled, and, on 19 December, headed back toward the Mindoro coast. On 20 December, she assumed patrol duties in Calavite Passage. On 21 December 1941, she shifted to the Verde Island Passage. On 27 December 1941, she reconnoitered Batangas Bay to investigate the detonation of fuel oil tanks and found only Filipino and American forces destroying the fuel oil supplies before they could be captured by the Japanese. On 28 December, while the noise of the exploding tanks continued, S-37 investigated reports of Japanese landings in Balayan Bay, then proceeded toward Looc Bay to verify or disprove a similar rumor. Finding both bays empty, she began to make her way south. On 30 December 1941, she was off Panay.

==== January 1942 ====
On 1 January 1942, S-37 suffered a fire in the starboard main motor panel. Repairs were made that night. On 2 and 3 January she patrolled off the entrance to Basilan Strait. There, she sighted a Japanese submarine, but was unable to close the range. On 4 January, she took up patrol duty off Japanese-held Jolo Island. On 5 January, she developed leaks in the air supply piping to the starboard main motor panel. Makeshift repairs decreased the air leaks, and S-37 remained in the Sulu district on 6 January. On 7 January, she continued south, toward Port Darwin. On 8 January, new orders arrived, and she set a course for Soerabaja, the Dutch naval base on the northeast coast of Java.

On 11 January 1942, Japanese forces moved on territory of the Netherlands East Indies, landing at Tarakan on Borneo and at Manado on Celebes. S-37, then off Stroomenkaap at the western end of Celebes's northern peninsula, was ordered to make for the Borneo coast. She arrived on 12 January and, for the next three days, remained in the Tarakan area, searching for Japanese transports and cargo ships, while at the same time eluding Imperial Japanese Navy destroyers. On 15 January 1942, she was ordered to leave the area, and on 23 January, unable to transmit identification messages, she approached Madoera Strait and surfaced for recognition by Dutch patrol vessels. At 2118, she arrived in Soerabaja Roads on the coast of Java. By the end of January 1942, Japanese forces on Borneo had moved south into Balikpapan, while those forces located in the Celebes moved into Kendari.

==== February 1942 ====
On 2 February 1942, S-37 departed Soerabaja and headed back to Makassar Strait. By 5 February, she was off Cape William. The next day, she shifted southward to patrol the southern approaches to Makassar City, and, on the evening of 8 February 1942, she sighted a destroyer, which was thought to be an advance guard unit for Japanese forces en route to that city.

At 1800, the destroyer, which S-37 allowed to pass unmolested, disappeared to the northwest. At 1813, S-37 sighted the masts and upper works of three Japanese destroyers in column at a distance 5 nautical miles (9250 m), estimated speed 15 knots (28 km/h; 17 mph). A half-hour's wait brought no transports or cargo ships into view, and S-37 went after the destroyer formation. Moving on the surface, she closed the four destroyers in column, distance 8,000 yards (7,300 m). All torpedoes were readied and, at 1946, she commenced her approach. A minute later, she sighted another, closer formation of four destroyers, distance 4,000 yards (3,700 m), plus the dim outlines of three large ships resembling transports, distance 3 nautical miles (5500 m), on a northerly course. It would turn out that S-37 had found fifteen transports in convoy.

At 1951, S-37 changed course to go after the transports. By 2010, however, the destroyers had increased speed to maintain cover for the transports as the formation turned and crossed ahead of the submarine at 4,000 yards (3,700 m). By 2030, S-37, unable to gain an unimpaired shot at the transports, shifted to attack the destroyers. Between 2036 and 2040, she closed to point-blank range, 800 yards (730 m), and launched one torpedo at each destroyer. Thirty seconds after firing the third torpedo, she observed a hit between the stacks of the third and, as black smoke rose, it buckled in the middle and formed a vee approximately 20 ft (6.1 m) above the bow and stern. Natsushio (2,000 tons) was doomed. She was, however, the only ship lost from this force, and the only confirmed ship S-37 sank.

The fourth destroyer sighted S-37 as she fired her fourth torpedo and turned to starboard. At 2041, S-37 dived and rigged for depth-charging. By 2043, the three remaining destroyers were overhead, their sonars pinging. S-37 ran silent. Between 2050 and 2215, the searching destroyers dropped depth charges at 10- to 15-minute intervals. S-37 reached 267 feet (81 m) as she evaded. By 2230, the destroyers had moved out of the area. S-37 reloaded and resumed the hunt.

S-37 remained in the area for another eight days, during which she sighted several Japanese ships. Her lack of speed precluded several attacks and, on 11 February 1942, faulty mechanisms in her old Mark 10 torpedoes caused them to sink before reaching their target. On 17 February, she passed the Paternoster Islands, and on 18 February she arrived off Lombok Strait. On 19 February, she patrolled in Lombok and Badoeng Straits, and on the morning of 20 February she received orders to return to Soerabaja. At 0500, she submerged and began making her way along the Bali coast. At 0615, she sighted three Japanese destroyers through her periscope on a northerly course, 3 nautical miles (5500 m)off. Astern of S-37, an obvious oil slick – the result of her going aground in the Lombok Strait – extended some 2,000 yards (2,000 m) in a glassy sea, but she remained undetected. Temporary repairs were soon reducing the oil slick. At 0700, when S-37 sighted another destroyer patrol, the slick remained obvious but unnoticed. By 0830, S-37 was avoiding sudden changes in depth which would aggravate the leak. The slick was minimized, but at 0915 a destroyer was heard on the starboard beam. Depth charges were dropped, and their explosions were followed by the detonation of aerial bombs. S-37 went to 150 feet (46 metres).

The depth charging and bombing continued until 1200, when S-37′s crew heard heavy anti-aircraft fire. The destroyer was distracted, but at 1245 she apparently resumed her search for S-37. After dropping three more depth charges, the destroyer continued to ping until after 1400. At 1415, S-37 went to periscope depth. The destroyer was 3,000 yards (2,700 m) off, but the seas had become choppy. No oil slick was visible.

S-37 cleared Lombok Strait at 1500 and, 25 hours later, moored at the Soerabaja Navy Yard. Repairs began immediately, but the Japanese were moving on Java. So, too, was the sub command situation; S-37 lost her skipper to USS Spearfish, replaced by James R. Reynolds, and on 26 February, S-37 was ordered out. Equipment and parts in the navy yard shops were recalled, stores from the limited supplies at the base were taken on and, after the return of two air compressor coolers, she got underway on the port main engine, as the ship's force completed reassembly of the starboard. Electrical steering failures, breakdowns in the coolers, and a change of orders delayed her departure; but, on the afternoon of 27 February, she moved out and headed north to patrol between Bawean Island and the western channel into Soerabaja Roads.

That night, the Battle of the Java Sea raged over the horizon, and, early on the morning of 28 February, the S-boat closed a Japanese formation of two cruisers and three destroyers retiring victoriously from the scene. A fight for depth control, however, precluded an attack. At mid-day, she sighted a 50-foot (15-metre) open boat from Dutch light cruiser De Ruyter, carrying sixty Allied survivors; although unable to accommodate all of them, she approached to take on casualties. Finding none, S-37 took on the two American sailors among them, transferred provisions, dispatched enciphered messages on the boat's location to ABDA headquarters, and resumed her patrol. That afternoon, she again attempted to attack an enemy formation, but was sighted and underwent a combined depth charging and aerial bombing.

==== March 1942 ====
For the next week, S-37 remained in the area. Depth charge and aerial attacks were frequent, each one aggravating the condition of worn parts and equipment and resulting in mechanical and electrical failures and in leaks through disintegrating manhole and hatch gaskets. On 6 March 1942, she headed for Western Australia. Her major leak, through the engine room hatch, had been slowed to 1 US gallon (3.8 L; 0.83 imp gal) every 20 minutes. S-37 left a misleading oil slick toward Lombok Strait, then moved farther east before turning south. By 11 March 1942, she was clear of the East Indies, and on 19 March she arrived at Fremantle, Australia.

==== April–June 1942 ====
In April 1942, S-37 continued on to Brisbane, Australia, where she joined Task Force 42 and, after a desperately needed six-week overhaul, departed for her fifth war patrol. Clearing Moreton Bay on 22 June 1942, she was in the Bismarck Islands by the end of June 1942, and, after patrolling in St. George Channel, she moved toward New Hanover. On 7 July 1942, she shifted back to the New Britain coast to patrol in the Lambert Point area. There, on the afternoon of 8 July 1942, she sighted a Japanese merchant ship escorted by a submarine chaser. Closing, she fired three torpedoes at 1405. Three explosions followed, sinking the 2,776-gross register ton Tenzan Maru. S-37 went to 110 feet (34 m) and ran silent on a northerly course as the submarine chaser dropped depth charges where the S-37 had been.

==== July–November 1942 ====
On 9 July 1942, S-37 patrolled between Dyaul and New Hanover. On 10 July, she moved into the New Hanover-Massau traffic lanes, and on 11 July she closed the New Ireland coast and continued south. For the next two days, she operated in the Rabaul area, then headed for Cape St. George and Australia. From 14 July, when a fire in the starboard main motor was quickly extinguished, she was plagued by mechanical and electrical failures. On 20 July, she sighted Cape Moreton Light, and on 21 July she moored alongside the submarine tender USS Griffin (AS-13) in Brisbane harbor.

Between 17 August and 13 September 1942, S-37 conducted her sixth war patrol, a defensive patrol in the Savo Island area in the Solomon Islands in support of U.S. forces fighting in the Guadalcanal campaign. On 2 September, she scored her only hit of the patrol when she damaged the last destroyer in a column of four which was steaming to the north of Savo. On 6 September, she moved into the Russell Islands, from which she departed the Solomon Islands and headed back to Brisbane. On 19 October 1942, she cleared Brisbane's harbor for the last time, and on 23 October 1942 she arrived at Nouméa, New Caledonia. After refueling, she served on a picket line station in defense of Nouméa. On 5 November 1942, after a fire in her port main motor added to problems of tank trouble, fuel shortage, and mechanical failures, she headed for Pearl Harbor.

==== 1943–1945 ====
From Pearl Harbor, S-37 continued on to San Diego, California, where she underwent an extensive overhaul during the winter of 1943. She remained at San Diego for the remainder of her career, employed as an antisubmarine warfare training ship through 1944.

=== Decommissioning and disposal ===
Decommissioned on 6 February 1945, S-37 was stripped, and her hulk was supposed to be expended as an aerial bombing target off San Diego, but she broke her tow cable and sank on 20 February 1945, coming to rest at a depth of some 50 to 60 feet (15 to 18 m). Her name was stricken from the Naval Vessel Register on 23 February 1945. Salvagers unsuccessfully tried to retrieve the wreck of S-37 for its scrap value, but lost her again off Imperial Beach, California, in 20 to 30 feet (6.1 to 9.1 m) of water at 32°36.2541′N 117°08.2334′W, where she remains to this day.

== Awards ==
- Yangtze Service Medal
- China Service Medal
- American Defense Service Medal
- American Campaign Medal
- Asiatic-Pacific Campaign Medal with five battle stars
- World War II Victory Medal
- Philippine Presidential Unit Citation
- Philippine Defense Medal with star
