= 4th Naval Armaments Supplement Programme =

Final of four Imperial Japanese Naval Expansion plans

The 4th Naval Armaments Supplement Program (第四次海軍軍備充実計画, Dai-Yo-Ji Kaigun Gunbi Jūjitsu Keikaku), otherwise known as the "Circle 4 Plan" (マル4計画, Maru 4 Keikaku), was the last armaments expansion plan of the Imperial Japanese Navy between 1930 and the start of World War II.

== Background ==
In 1939, the IJN started a new naval armaments expansion plan. It extended to 80 warships and 75 Naval Air Groups by 1.6 billion JPY.

== Table of vessels ==
Category	Class	Vessel number(s)	Completed	Converted	Cancelled
Training cruiser	Katori	#101	Kashii (#101)		
Minelayer	Hatsutaka	#102	Wakataka (#102)		
Combat support ship	Sunosaki	#103	Sunosaki (#103)		
Destroyer Type-B	Akizuki	#104–109	Akizuki (#104), Teruzuki (#105), Suzutsuki (#106), Hatsuzuki (#107), Niizuki (#108), Wakatsuki (#109)		
Battleship	Yamato	#110–111		#110 was converted to aircraft carrier	#111
Aircraft carrier	Shinano	#110–111	Shinano (#110)		
Destroyer Type-A	Kagerō	#112–114	Arashi (#112), Hagikaze (#113), Maikaze (#114), Akigumo (#115)	#115 was converted from the Yūgumo class	
Destroyer Type-A	Yūgumo	#115–129	Yūgumo (#116), Makigumo (#117), Kazagumo (#118), Naganami (#119), Makinami (#120), Takanami (#121), Ōnami (#122), Kiyonami (#123), Tamanami (#124), Suzunami (#126), Fujinami (#127)	#115 was converted to the Kagerō class #125 was converted to the Shimakaze class #128 and #129 were dummy of naval budget of the Yamato-class battleships	
Destroyer Type-C	Shimakaze		Shimakaze (#125)		
Aircraft carrier	Taihō	#130	Taihō (#130)		
Seaplane tender	Akitsushima	#131	Akitsushima (#131)		
Light cruiser Type-B	Agano	#132–135	Agano (#132), Noshiro (#133), Yahagi (#134), Sakawa (#135)		
Light cruiser Type-C	Ōyodo	#136–137	Ōyodo (#136)		#137
Cruiser submarine Type-A	I-9	#138	I-11 (#138)		
Cruiser submarine Type-B	I-15	#139–153	I-26 (#139) to I-39 (#152)	#153 was dummy of naval budget of the Yamato-class battleships	
Large sized submarine	I-176	#154–163	I-176 (#154) to I-185 (#163)		
Minesweeper	No.19	#164–169	No.19 (#164) to No.24 (#169)		
Minelayer	Sokuten	#170–179	Hirashima (#170), Hōko (#171), Ishizaki (#172), Takashima (#173), Saishū (#174), Niizaki (#175), Yurijima (#176), Nuwajima (#177), Maeshima (#178)		#179
Subchaser	No.13	#180–183	No.13 (#180) to No.16 (#183)		
Cable layer	Hashima		Hashima, Tsurushima, Ōdate, Tateishi		
Food supply ship	No.4006		No.4006 (later renamed Kinesaki)		
Food supply ship	No.4007		No.4007 (later renamed Nosaki)		

== See also ==
- 1st Naval Armaments Supplement Programme (Maru 1 Keikaku, 1931)
- 2nd Naval Armaments Supplement Programme (Maru 2 Keikaku, 1934)
- 3rd Naval Armaments Supplement Programme (Maru 3 Keikaku, 1937)
- Temporal Naval Armaments Supplement Programme (Maru Rin Keikaku, 1940)
- Rapidly Naval Armaments Supplement Programme (Maru Kyū Keikaku, 1941)
- Additional Naval Armaments Supplement Programme (Maru Tui Keikaku, 1941)
- 5th Naval Armaments Supplement Programme (Maru 5 Keikaku, 1941)
- 6th Naval Armaments Supplement Programme (Maru 6 Keikaku, 1942)
- Modified 5th Naval Armaments Supplement Programme (Kai-Maru 5 Keikaku, 1942)
- Wartime Naval Armaments Supplement Programme (Maru Sen Keikaku, 1944)
- マル4計画 (ja)
