= Japanese destroyer Hayanami =

Yūgumo-class destroyer

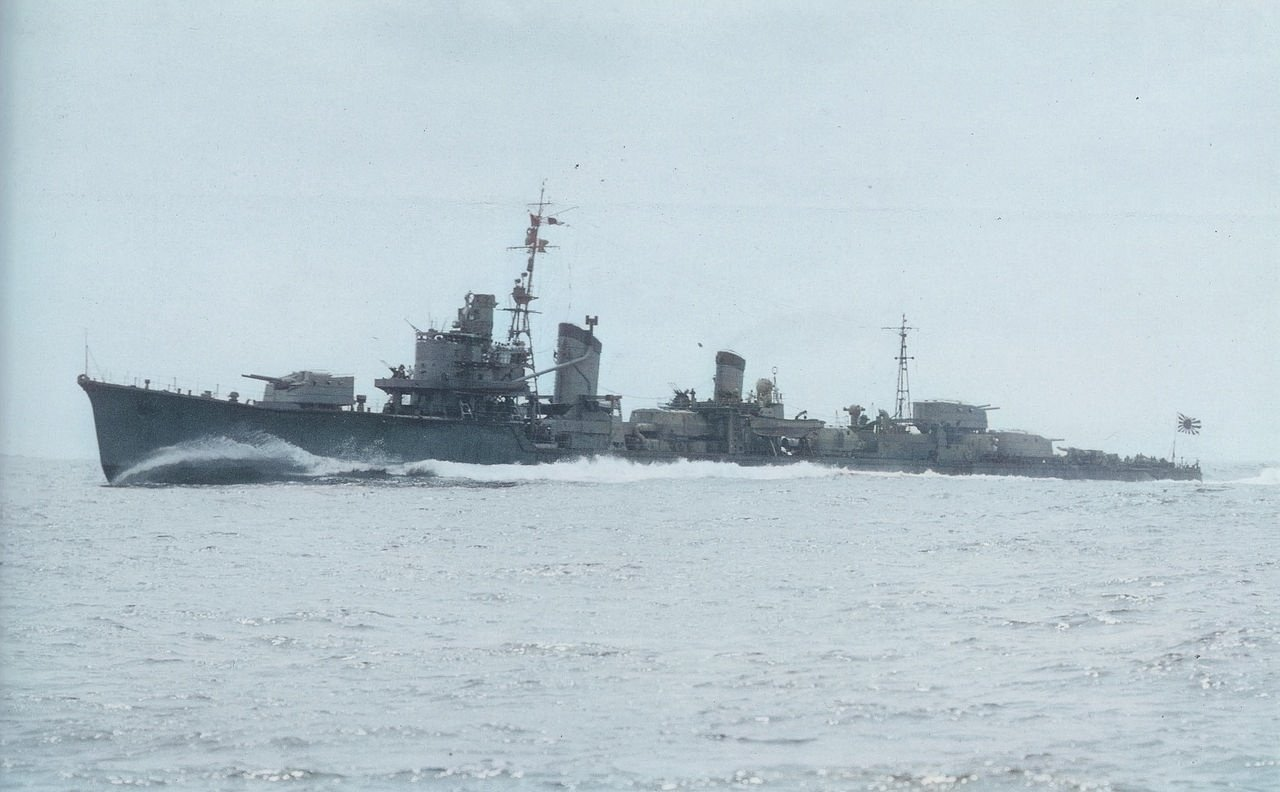
- Hayanami underway on 24 July 1943

History

Empire of Japan
- Name: Hayanami
- Builder: Maizuru Naval Arsenal
- Laid down: 15 January 1942
- Launched: 19 December 1942
- Completed: 31 July 1943
- Stricken: 10 August 1944
- Fate: Torpedoed and sunk on 7 June 1944

General characteristics
- Class & type: Yūgumo-class destroyer
- Displacement: 2,520 long tons (2,560 t)
- Length: 119.15 m (390 ft 11 in)
- Beam: 10.8 m (35 ft 5 in)
- Draught: 3.75 m (12 ft 4 in)
- Speed: 35 knots (65 km/h; 40 mph)
- Complement: 228
- Armament: 6 × 127 mm (5.0 in)/50 caliber DP guns; up to 28 × Type 96 25 mm (0.98 in) AA guns; up to 4 × 13.2 mm (0.52 in) AA guns; 8 × 610 mm (24 in) torpedo tubes for Type 93 torpedoes; 36 depth charges

Hayanami (早波; "Early Waves") was a Yūgumo-class destroyer of the Imperial Japanese Navy.

== Design and description ==
The Yūgumo class was a repeat of the preceding Kagerō class with minor improvements that increased their anti-aircraft capabilities. Their crew numbered 228 officers and enlisted men. The ships measured 119.17 meters (391 ft 0 in) overall, with a beam of 10.8 meters (35 ft 5 in) and a draft of 3.76 meters (12 ft 4 in). They displaced 2,110 metric tons (2,080 long tons) at standard load and 2,560 metric tons (2,520 long tons) at deep load. The ships had two Kampon geared steam turbines, each driving one propeller shaft, using steam provided by three Kampon water-tube boilers. The turbines were rated at a total of 52,000 shaft horsepower (39,000 kW) for a designed speed of 35 knots (65 km/h; 40 mph).

The main armament of the Yūgumo class consisted of six Type 3 127-millimeter (5.0 in) guns in three twin-gun turrets, one superfiring pair aft and one turret forward of the superstructure. The guns were able to elevate up to 75° to increase their ability against aircraft, but their slow rate of fire, slow traversing speed, and the lack of any sort of high-angle fire-control system meant that they were virtually useless as anti-aircraft guns. They were built with four Type 96 25-millimeter (1.0 in) anti-aircraft guns in two twin-gun mounts, but more of these guns were added over the course of the war. The ships were also armed with eight 610-millimeter (24.0 in) torpedo tubes in a two quadruple traversing mounts; one reload was carried for each tube. Their anti-submarine weapons comprised two depth charge throwers for which 36 depth charges were carried.

== Construction and career ==
Hayanami was laid down on 15 January 1942, launched later on 19 December, and commissioned on 31 July 1943, taking part in a series of training missions over the next month. On 20 August, Hayanami was appointed as Captain Nakahara Giichiro's flagship of destroyer division 32 (Hayanami, Fujinami, Suzunami, Tamanami).

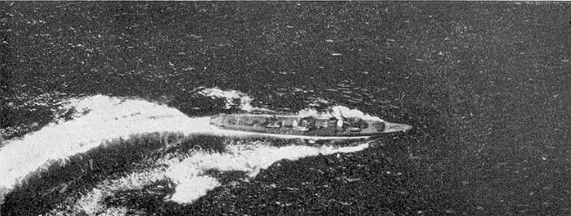
Hayanami under air attacks during the bombing of Rabaul, 5 November 1943

From 15–20 October 1943, Hayanami led destroyer division 32 on troop transport runs from Saeki to Truk. The destroyer was used on troop transport runs from Truk to Ponape on 22-24 and 26–28 October. From 3-5 November, Hayanami escorted Admiral Kurita's cruiser force to Rabaul, and immediately upon arriving, American carrier aircraft attacked the anchorage in a series of raids known as the bombing of Rabaul; Hayanami maneuvered through the port without damage, although Suzunami was sunk. After a troop transport run, Hayanami escorted the damaged cruisers Maya and Noshiro to Truk, and while underway assisted the damaged cruiser Agano as well. With the start of December, the Hamanami was incorporated into destroyer division 32, which then escorted the fleet off the Marshall islands, before escorting tanker convoys to Surabaya and Balikpapan.

With the start of 1944, Hayanami evacuated the sinking cargo ship Akebono Maru, then escorting three oil tankers to Truk, three of which were sunk by American submarines while underway. Hayanami then spent the next three months on escorting duty between Palau and Saipan, before on 15 April Captain Orita Tsuneo replaced Nakahara in command of destroyer division 32, but his time was short lived. From 12-15 May, Hayanami escorted the fleet from Lingga to Tawi-Tawi, before departing on patrol duty on 7 June. However, while underway Japanese aircraft spotted the submarine USS Harder, which had just a day earlier sank the destroyer Minazuki. Hayanami closed the range in an attempt to unleash a barrage of depth charges, but the tables were turned as Harder unloaded three torpedoes at close range, two of which made their mark as Hayanami blew apart and sank a minute later; 208 men were killed including Captain Tsuneo while 45 men were rescued by the destroyer Urakaze.
