= Suzunami =

Suzunami may refer to:

- Japanese destroyer Suzunami (1943), a Yūgumo-class destroyer of the Imperial Japanese Navy
- JS Suzunami (DD-114), a Takanami-class destroyer of the JMSDF
