= Japanese destroyer Hayashimo =

Yūgumo-class destroyer

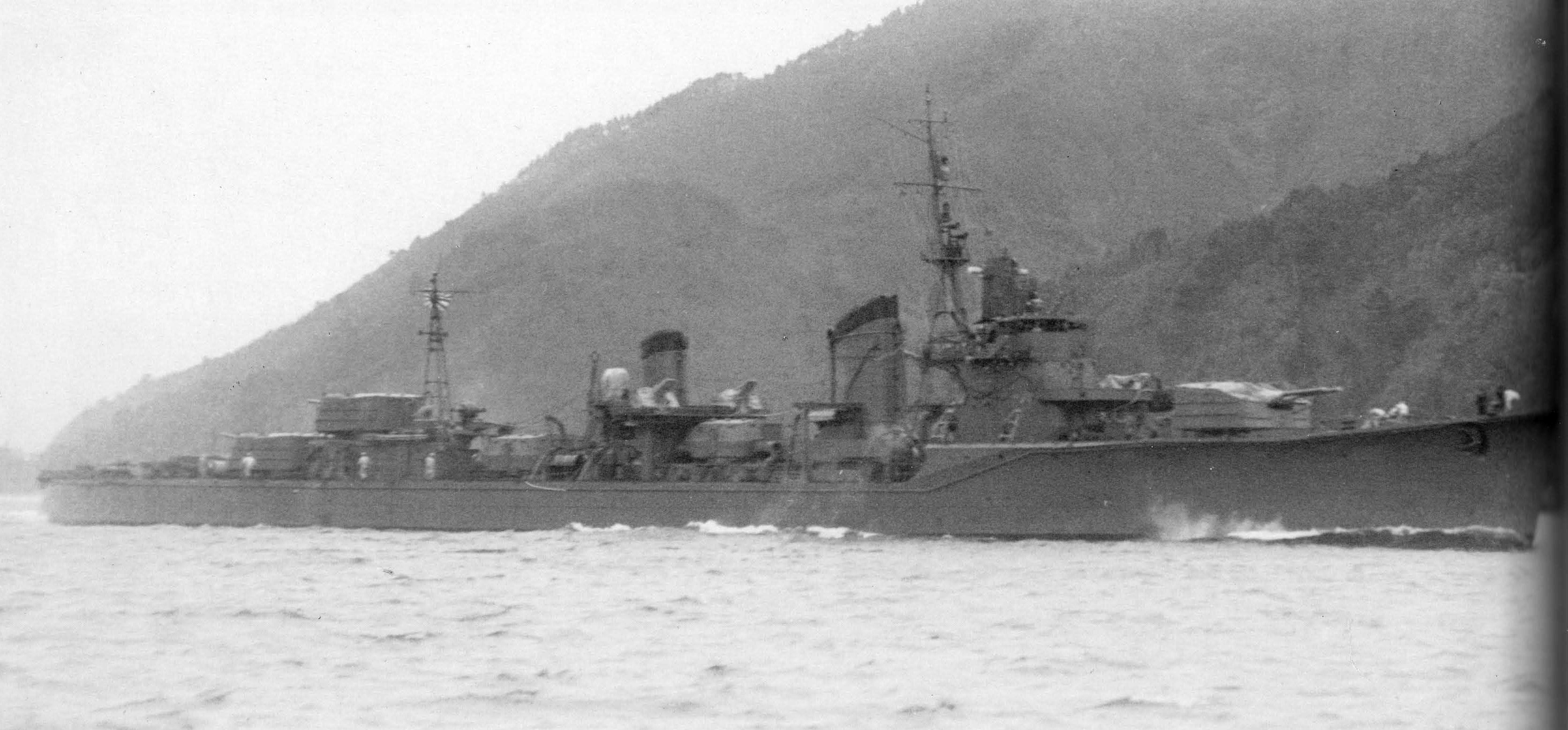
- Hayashimo on sea trials on 2 February 1944

History

Empire of Japan
- Name: Hayashimo
- Builder: Maizuru Naval Arsenal
- Laid down: 20 January 1943
- Launched: 20 October 1943
- Completed: 20 February 1944
- Stricken: 10 January 1945
- Fate: Sunk in action, 26 October 1944

General characteristics
- Class & type: Yūgumo-class destroyer
- Displacement: 2,520 long tons (2,560 t)
- Length: 119.15 m (390 ft 11 in)
- Beam: 10.8 m (35 ft 5 in)
- Draught: 3.75 m (12 ft 4 in)
- Speed: 35 knots (40 mph; 65 km/h)
- Complement: 228
- Armament: 6 × 127 mm (5.0 in)/50 caliber DP guns; up to 28 × Type 96 25 mm (0.98 in) AA guns; up to 4 × 13.2 mm (0.52 in) AA guns; 8 × 610 mm (24 in) torpedo tubes for Type 93 torpedoes; 36 depth charges

Hayashimo (早霜; "Early Frost") was a Yūgumo-class destroyer of the Imperial Japanese Navy.

== Design and description ==
The Yūgumo class was a repeat of the preceding Kagerō class with minor improvements that increased their anti-aircraft capabilities. Their crew numbered 228 officers and enlisted men. The ships measured 119.17 meters (391 ft 0 in) overall, with a beam of 10.8 meters (35 ft 5 in) and a draft of 3.76 meters (12 ft 4 in). They displaced 2,110 metric tons (2,080 long tons) at standard load and 2,560 metric tons (2,520 long tons) at deep load. The ships had two Kampon geared steam turbines, each driving one propeller shaft, using steam provided by three Kampon water-tube boilers. The turbines were rated at a total of 52,000 shaft horsepower (39,000 kW) for a designed speed of 35 knots (65 km/h; 40 mph).

The main armament of the Yūgumo class consisted of six Type 3 127-millimeter (5.0 in) guns in three twin-gun turrets, one superfiring pair aft and one turret forward of the superstructure. The guns were able to elevate up to 75° to increase their ability against aircraft, but their slow rate of fire, slow traversing speed, and the lack of any sort of high-angle fire-control system meant that they were virtually useless as anti-aircraft guns. They were built with four Type 96 25 mm (0.98 in) anti-aircraft guns in two twin-gun mounts, but more of these guns were added over the course of the war. The ships were also armed with eight 610-millimeter (24.0 in) torpedo tubes in a two quadruple traversing mounts; one reload was carried for each tube. Their anti-submarine weapons comprised two depth charge throwers for which 36 depth charges were carried.

== Construction and career ==
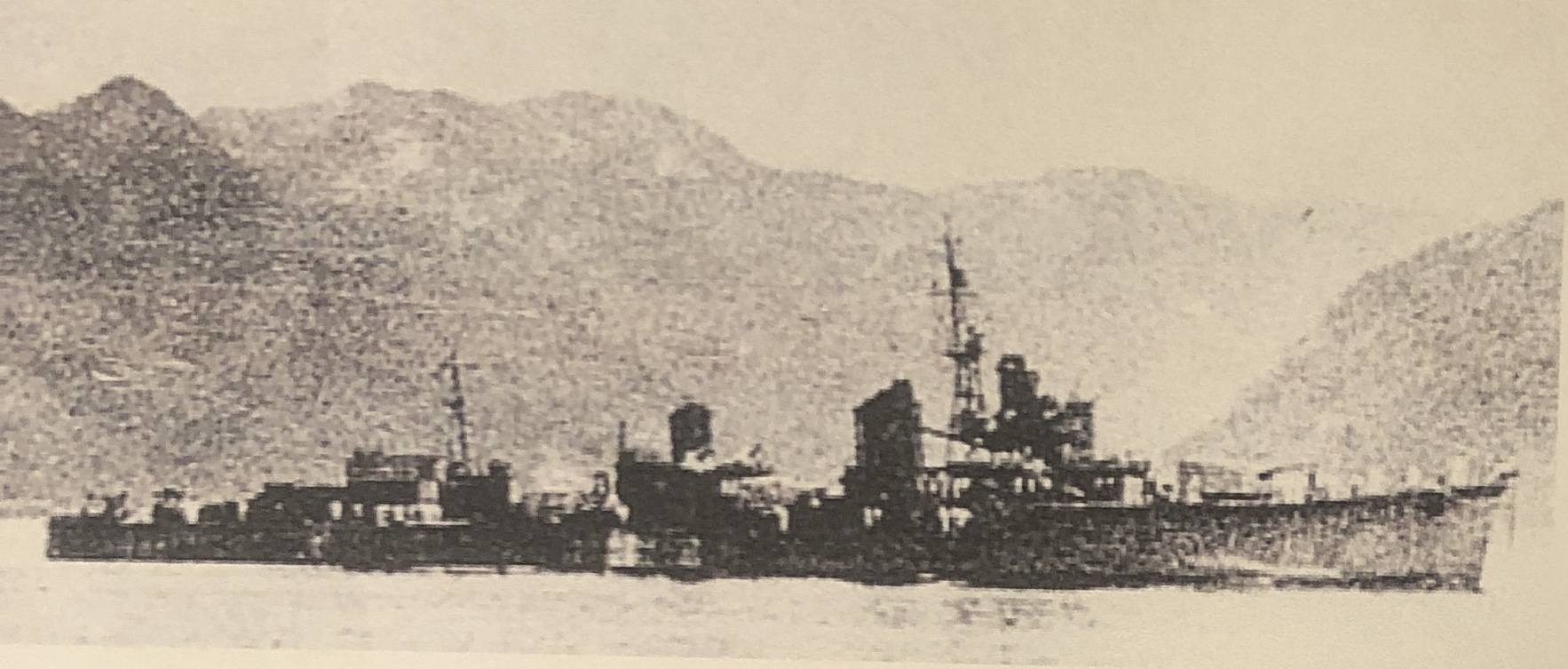
Hayashimo at anchor on 9 February 1944

Hayashimo was laid down on 20 January 1943, launched later that October, and commissioned into the Imperial Japanese navy on 20 February 1944. She was not assigned to a division and instead spent the first few months of her career escorting various aircraft carriers to occupied ports. In May, Hayashimo escorted the fleet to Tawi-Tawi during the lead up to Operation A-Go, which commenced from 19-20 June. In what became known as the battle of the Philippine Sea, Hayashimo saw service as an anti-aircraft escort, and personally witnessed the sinking of the aircraft carrier Hiyō to USS Belleau Wood torpedo bombers. The Japanese lost three aircraft carriers, two oil tankers, and some 400 aircraft and only damaged one American battleship in turn, ending the battle in a devastating American victory.

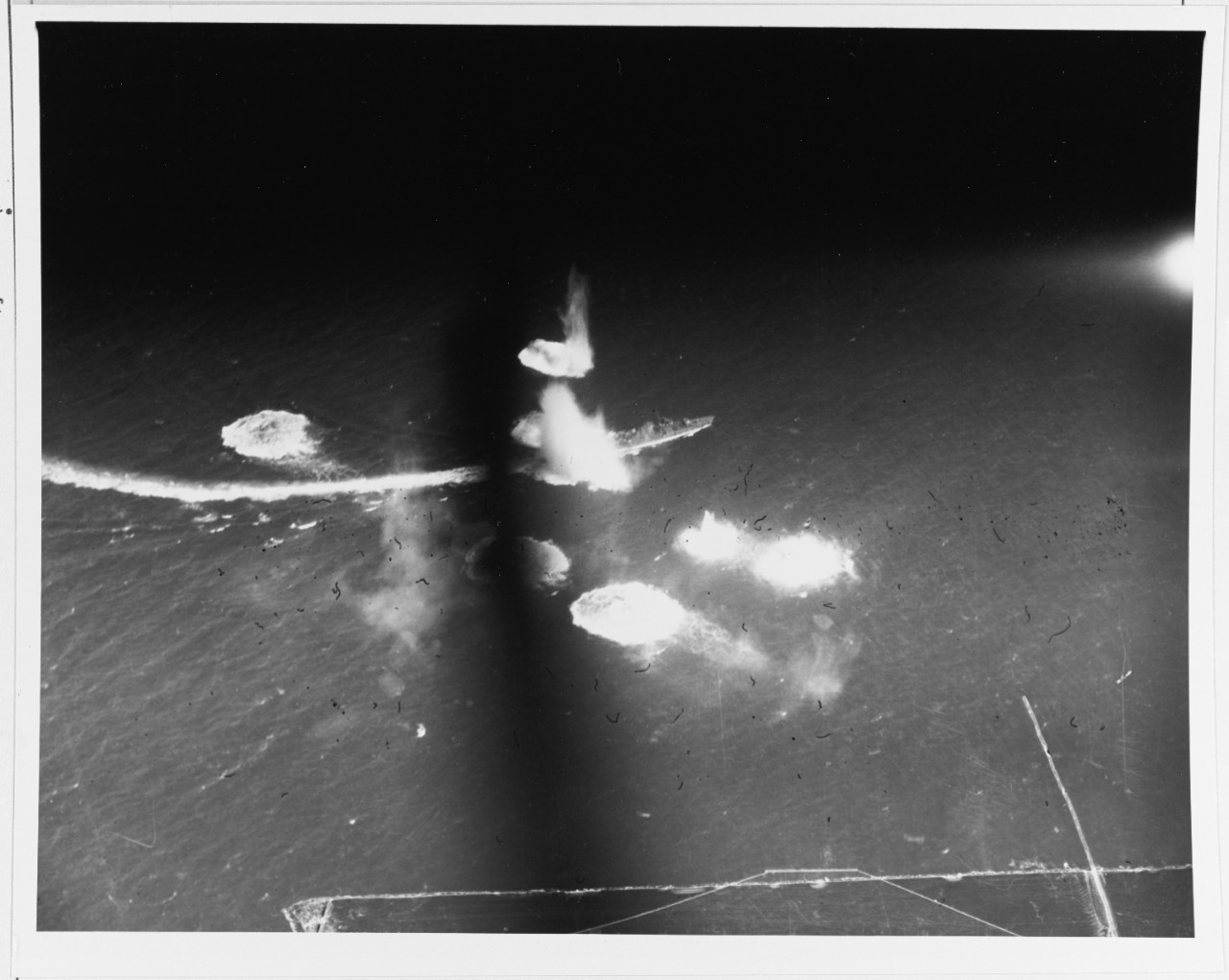
Hayashimo under attack by USS Cowpens aircraft, 26 October 1944

Shortly after the battle, Hayashimo was personally attacked by two US aircraft, but repelled them with gunfire before returning to Okinawa. With the start of July, Hayashimo took part on a troop transport mission to Singapore. On 15 August, Hayashimo was finally transferred to the newly reformed destroyer division 2 (Hayashimo, Akishimo, Kiyoshimo) as flagship of Captain Shiraishi Nagayoshi. They spent the next two months operating off Singapore.

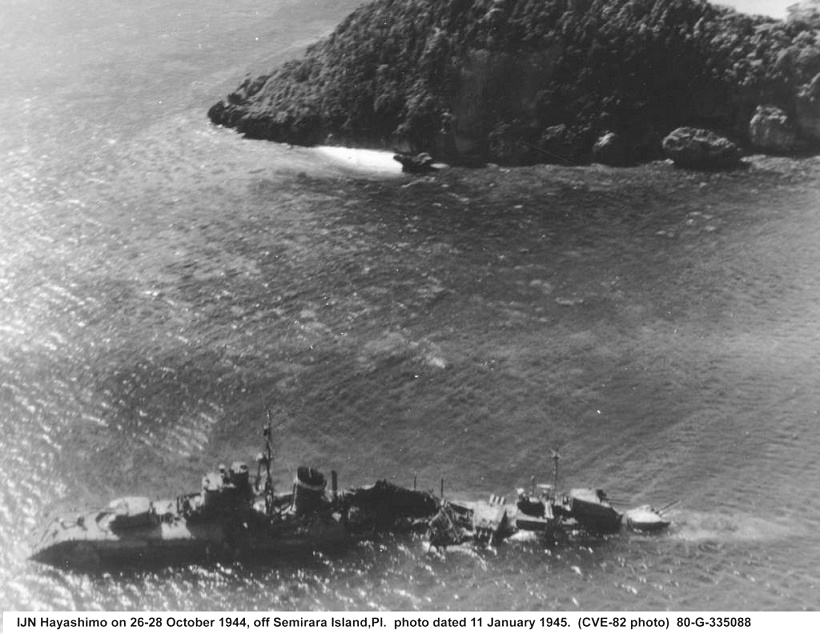
Hayashimo's grounded wreck on 11 January 1945

In October, Hayashimo led desdiv 2 to a stop in Manila before arriving at Brunei on the 20th in preporation for Operation Sho-Go. The Japanese fleet departed 2 days later in an attempt to intercept and destroy allied troop convoys. On the 23rd, US submarines sank two Japanese heavy cruisers and crippled a third in what became the opening states of the battle of Leyte Gulf - Hayashimo attacked the submarine USS Dace but failed to damage her - and the next day US carrier aircraft attacked. Hayashimo was undamaged before continuing onto the fight against the escort carriers and destroyers of Taffy 3. Hayashimo fired multiple salvos against the escort carriers but failed to land a hit. However, bomb near misses contaminated her fuel supply and destroyed her gyro compass and communications. The next day, the damaged Hayashimo was limping at 12 knots, escorted by Akishimo, when additional American aircraft gouged the destroyer with a torpedo hit that jackknifed her bow, causing her to run aground. The destroyer Okinami loaded Hayashimo with 12 tons of fuel, but this did not help. The next day, the destroyers Fujinami and Shiranui were detached to assist the grounded Hayashimo, but they too were sunk by carrier aircraft with the loss of all hands. Near miss damage flooded Hayashimo's steering room and destroyed her rudder. With that, Captain Nagayoshi and the other 200 survivors finally evacuated Hayashimo and left her to her fate 40 miles (64 km) southeast of Mindoro (12°4′5.3″N 121°22′8.8″E). Attacks by land based aircraft and the destroyer USS Walke throughout December further mauled the fatally wounded Hayashimo, causing her to settle a meter deeper into the sand. After the war. her shallow wreck was inspected by the US navy.
