= Japanese destroyer Kiyoshimo =

Yūgumo-class destroyer

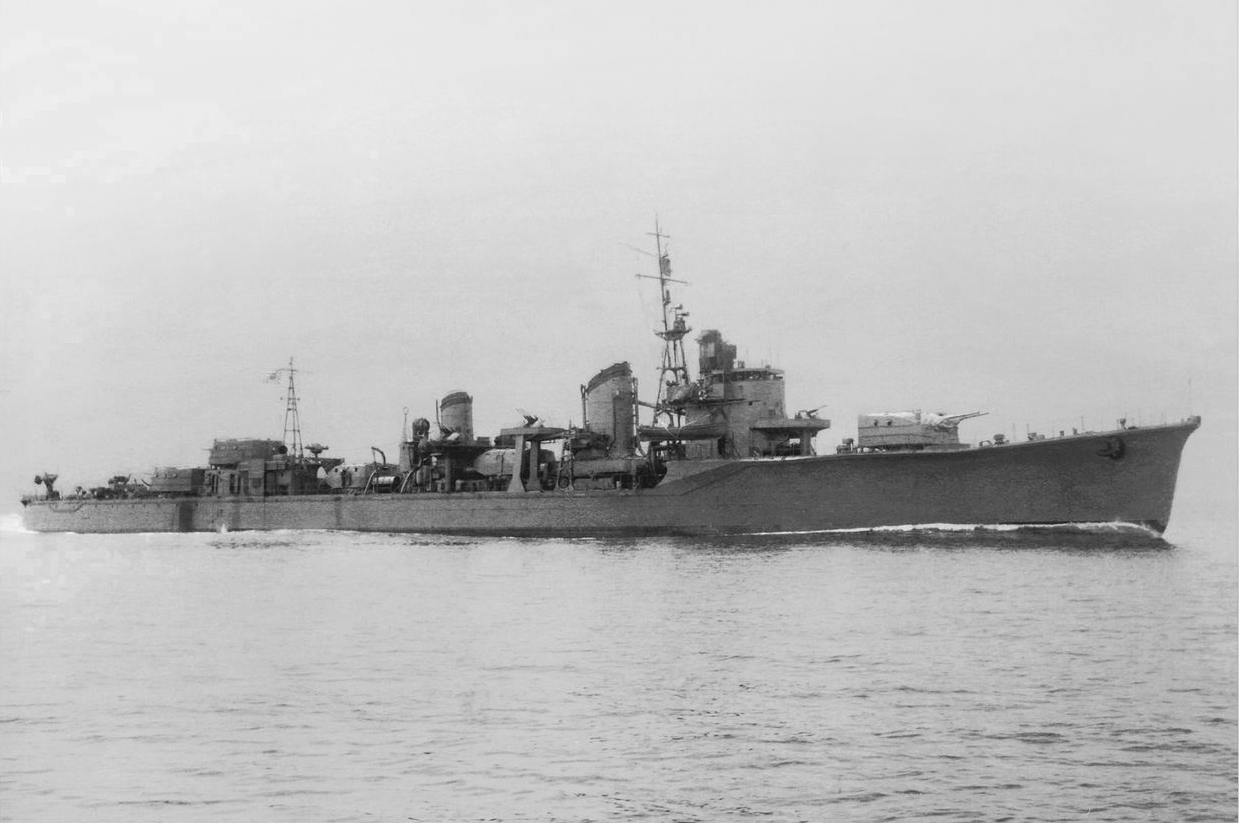
- Kiyoshimo off Uraga on 15 May 1944.

History

Empire of Japan
- Name: Kiyoshimo
- Builder: Uraga Dock Company
- Launched: 29 February 1944
- Completed: 16 May 1944
- Stricken: 10 February 1945
- Fate: Sunk in action, 26 December 1944

General characteristics
- Class & type: Yūgumo-class destroyer
- Displacement: 2,520 long tons (2,560 t)
- Length: 119.15 m (390 ft 11 in)
- Beam: 10.8 m (35 ft 5 in)
- Draught: 3.75 m (12 ft 4 in)
- Speed: 35 knots (40 mph; 65 km/h)
- Complement: 228
- Armament: 6 × 127 mm (5.0 in)/50 caliber DP guns; up to 28 × Type 96 25 mm (0.98 in) AA guns; up to 4 × 13.2 mm (0.52 in) AA guns; 8 × 610 mm (24 in) torpedo tubes for Type 93 torpedoes; 36 depth charges

Kiyoshimo (清霜; "Clear Frost") was a Yūgumo-class destroyer of the Imperial Japanese Navy.

== Design and description ==
The Yūgumo class was a repeat of the preceding Kagerō class with minor improvements that increased their anti-aircraft capabilities. Their crew numbered 228 officers and enlisted men. The ships measured 119.17 meters (391 ft 0 in) overall, with a beam of 10.8 meters (35 ft 5 in) and a draft of 3.76 meters (12 ft 4 in). They displaced 2,110 metric tons (2,080 long tons) at standard load and 2,560 metric tons (2,520 long tons) at deep load. The ships had two Kampon geared steam turbines, each driving one propeller shaft, using steam provided by three Kampon water-tube boilers. The turbines were rated at a total of 52,000 shaft horsepower (39,000 kW) for a designed speed of 35 knots (65 km/h; 40 mph).

The main armament of the Yūgumo class consisted of six Type 3 127-millimeter (5.0 in) guns in three twin-gun turrets, one superfiring pair aft and one turret forward of the superstructure. The guns were able to elevate up to 75° to increase their ability against aircraft, but their slow rate of fire, slow traversing speed, and the lack of any sort of high-angle fire-control system meant that they were virtually useless as anti-aircraft guns. They were built with four Type 96 25-millimeter (1.0 in) anti-aircraft guns in two twin-gun mounts, but more of these guns were added over the course of the war. The ships were also armed with eight 610-millimeter (24.0 in) torpedo tubes in a two quadruple traversing mounts; one reload was carried for each tube. Their anti-submarine weapons comprised two depth charge throwers for which 36 depth charges were carried.

== Construction and career ==
Kiyoshimo was the last destroyer of the Yūgumo class completed, commissioned off Uraga on 16 May 1944. Kiyoshimo promptly took part in a series of training exercises which lasted until August, where she was assigned to the 2nd destroyer division alongside Hayashimo and Akishimo. Lieutenant Commander Kajimoto Shizuka received command of the ship.

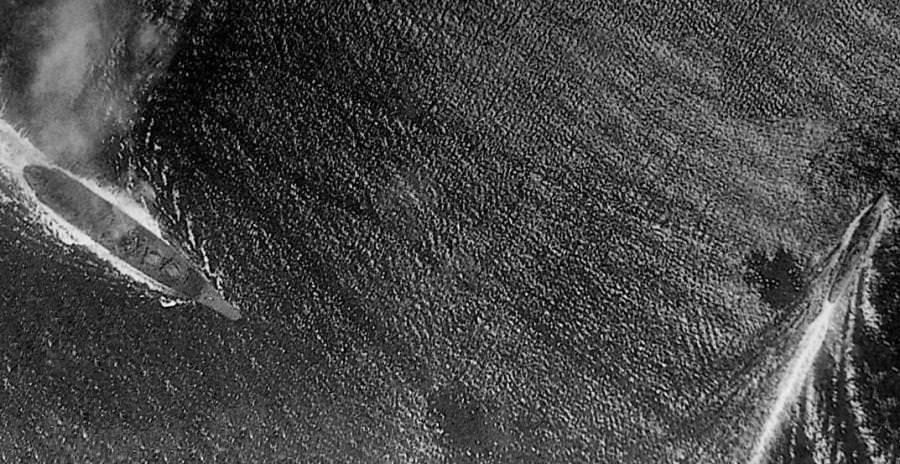
Kiyoshimo to the right and Musashi to the left during the battle of Leyte Gulf, 24 October 1944

From 18-20 October, Kiyoshimo escorted Admiral Takao Kurita's fleet to Brunei in preparation for the battle of Leyte Gulf. Departing on the 22nd, Kiyoshimo survived the submarine attacks the next morning which sank two heavy cruisers and crippled a third, before being undertaken by air attacks in the Sibuyan Sea the next day. Kiyoshimo operated alongside the battleship Musashi, and was photographed in the background several times by US carrier aircraft attacking Musashi, which over nine hours sank to at least 17 bomb and 19-20 torpedo hits. Kiyoshimo was not unscathed, taking one direct bomb hit and several near misses which cut her speed to 21 knots and destroyed her radio equipment. The destroyer Hamakaze was also damaged in the attack, and together she and Kiyoshimo assisted Musashi's survivors and withdrew from the battle.

On the 27th, Kiyoshimo was patched up at the Cavite naval yard, before finally returning to Brunei. Kiyoshimo then transported Admiral Hayakawa to Manila, before escorting the crippled heavy cruiser Takao to Singapore, where upon arriving she was drydocked for more permanent repairs on 8 November.

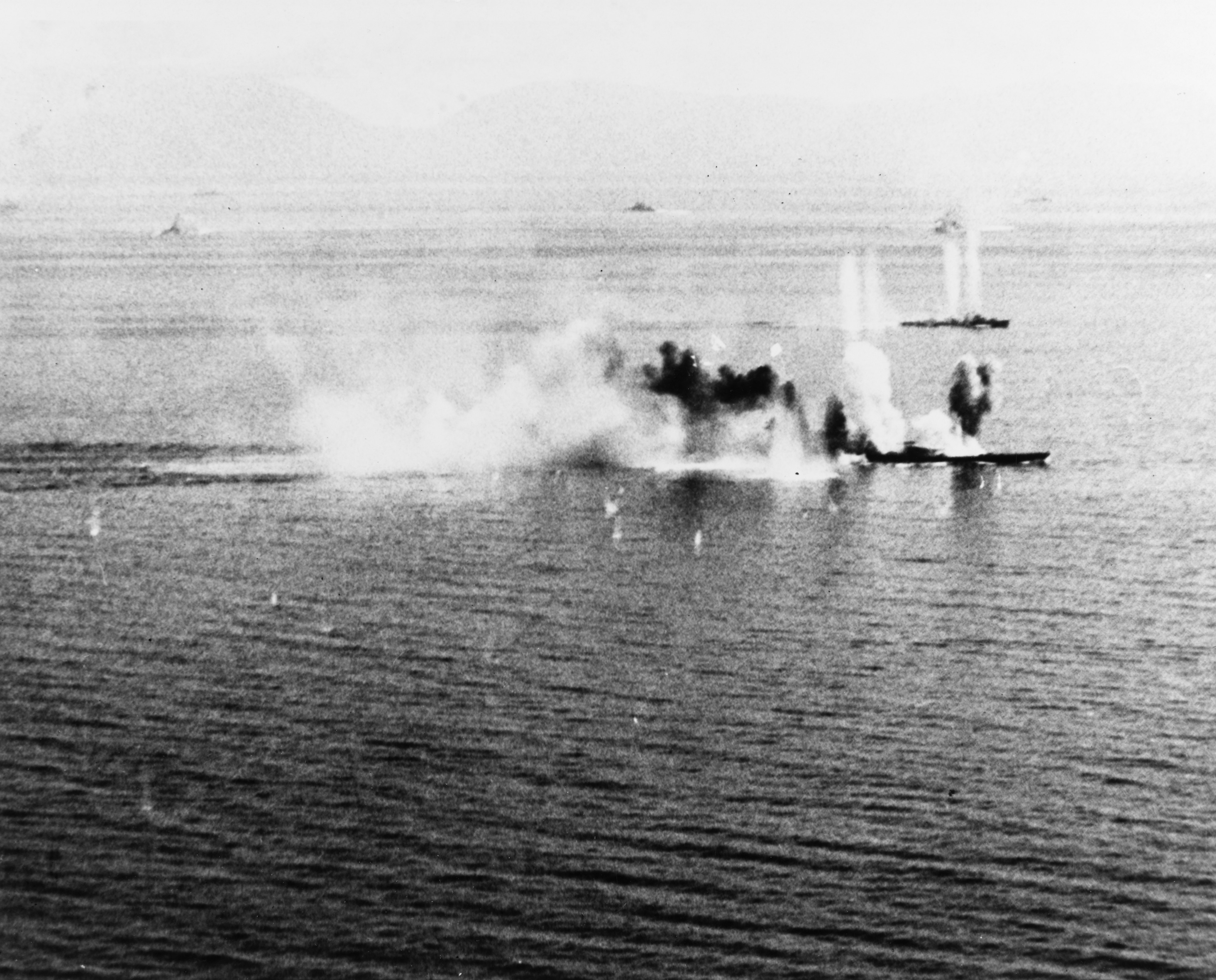
A famous photo of Musashi down by the bow during her final battle. Kiyoshimo is the nearest destroyer behind Musashi

On 26 December 1944, then with the San Jose bombardment force, Kiyoshimo was crippled by two direct bomb hits in attacks by U.S. Army bombers during the approach to Mindoro, Philippines. The ship was then finished off by a torpedo from U.S. PT-223, 145 miles (233 km) south of Manila (12°20′N 121°0′E); 82 were killed and 74 injured. The destroyer Asashimo rescued 169 survivors, including ComDesDiv 2, Captain Shiraishi Nagayoshi, and Lieutenant Commander Kajimoto; U.S. PT boats rescued five others.
