= Japanese destroyer Hamanami =

Yūgumo-class destroyer

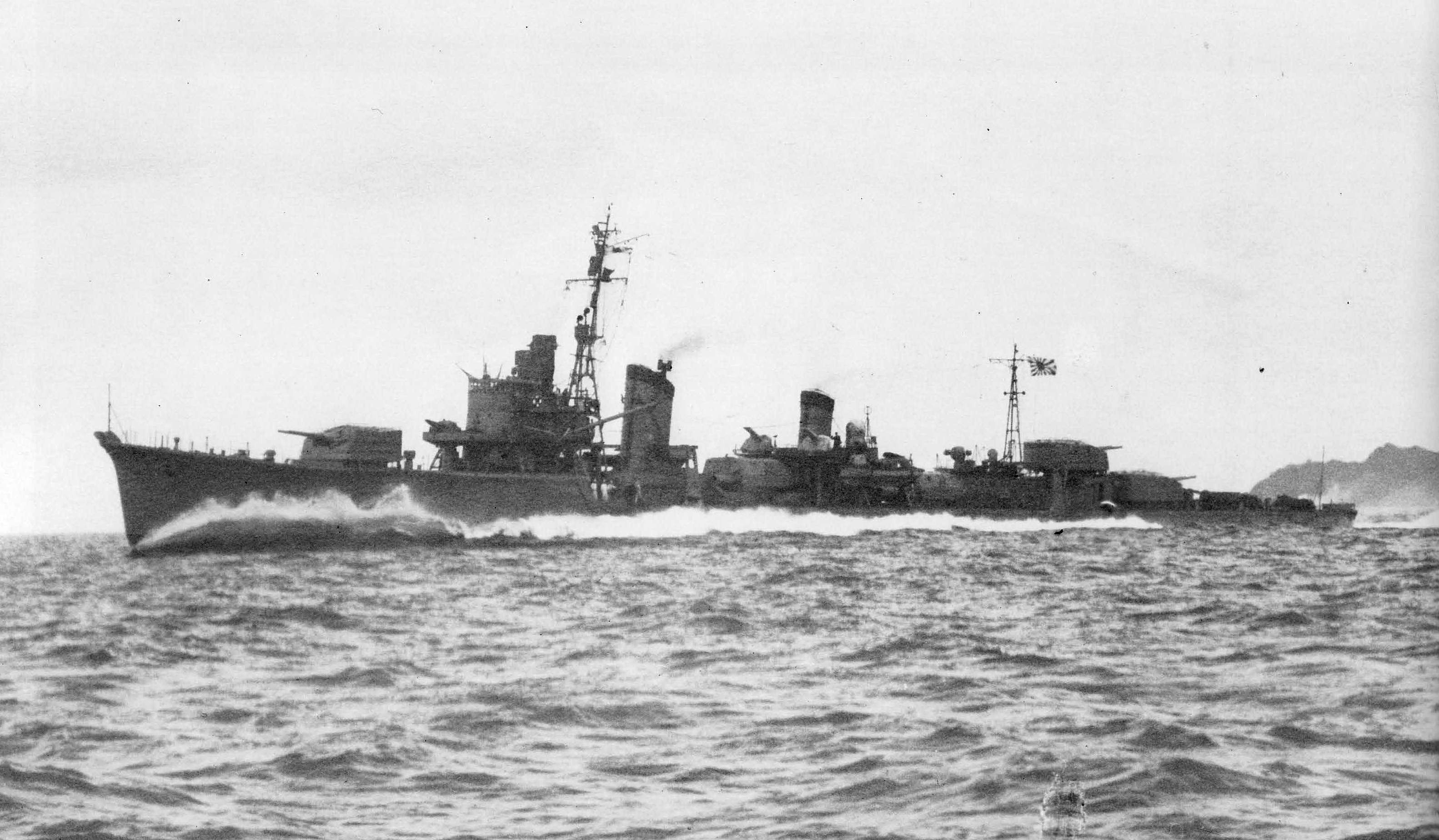
- Hamanami underway on 10 October 1943

History

Empire of Japan
- Name: Hamanami
- Builder: Maizuru Naval Arsenal
- Launched: 18 April 1943
- Completed: 15 October 1943
- Stricken: 10 January 1945
- Fate: Sunk in action, 11 November 1944

General characteristics
- Class & type: Yūgumo-class destroyer
- Displacement: 2,520 long tons (2,560 t)
- Length: 119.15 m (390 ft 11 in)
- Beam: 10.8 m (35 ft 5 in)
- Draught: 3.75 m (12 ft 4 in)
- Speed: 35 knots (40 mph; 65 km/h)
- Complement: 228
- Armament: 6 × 127 mm (5.0 in)/50 caliber DP guns; up to 28 × Type 96 25 mm (0.98 in) AA guns; up to 4 × 13.2 mm (0.52 in) AA guns; 8 × 610 mm (24 in) torpedo tubes for Type 93 torpedoes; 36 depth charges

Hamanami (浜波; "Beach Waves") was a Yūgumo-class destroyer of the Imperial Japanese Navy.

== Design and description ==
The Yūgumo class was a repeat of the preceding Kagerō class with minor improvements that increased their anti-aircraft capabilities. Their crew numbered 228 officers and enlisted men. The ships measured 119.17 meters (391 ft 0 in) overall, with a beam of 10.8 meters (35 ft 5 in) and a draft of 3.76 meters (12 ft 4 in). They displaced 2,110 metric tons (2,080 long tons) at standard load and 2,560 metric tons (2,520 long tons) at deep load. The ships had two Kampon geared steam turbines, each driving one propeller shaft, using steam provided by three Kampon water-tube boilers. The turbines were rated at a total of 52,000 shaft horsepower (39,000 kW) for a designed speed of 35 knots (65 km/h; 40 mph).

The main armament of the Yūgumo class consisted of six Type 3 127-millimeter (5.0 in) guns in three twin-gun turrets, one superfiring pair aft and one turret forward of the superstructure. The guns were able to elevate up to 75° to increase their ability against aircraft, but their slow rate of fire, slow traversing speed, and the lack of any sort of high-angle fire-control system meant that they were virtually useless as anti-aircraft guns. They were built with four Type 96 25-millimeter (1.0 in) anti-aircraft guns in two twin-gun mounts, but more of these guns were added over the course of the war. The ships were also armed with eight 610-millimeter (24.0 in) torpedo tubes in a two quadruple traversing mounts; one reload was carried for each tube. Their anti-submarine weapons comprised two depth charge throwers for which 36 depth charges were carried.

== Construction and career ==
Hamanami participated in the battles of the Philippine Sea, Leyte Gulf and Samar. She was assigned to 1st Diversion Task Force. On 26 October the destroyer assisted in the sinking of the cruiser Noshiro.

On 11 November 1944, Hamanami was escorting troop convoy TA No. 3 from Manila, Philippines to Ormoc. She was sunk by aircraft of Task Force 38 in Ormoc Bay, west of Leyte (10°50′N 124°35′E), with 63 killed and 42 injured. The destroyer Asashimo rescued 167 survivors, including ComDesDiv 32 (Captain Oshima Ichitaro) and Commander Motokura. Three transports and their escorts, Shimakaze, Wakatsuki and Naganami, all went down with Hamanami.

== Wreck ==
On 20 January 2018, Hamanami was located by the research ship RV Petrel at a depth of 325 meters (1,066 ft) in Ormoc Bay. She was positively identified as a Yūgumo-class destroyer with her configuration of 127 mm guns and torpedo launchers. From the action reports by the US planes that sank her, Hamanami's bow was blown off before sinking. At the bottom, her whole bow section was missing.
