= Japanese destroyer Yūgumo (1941) =

Yūgumo-class destroyer

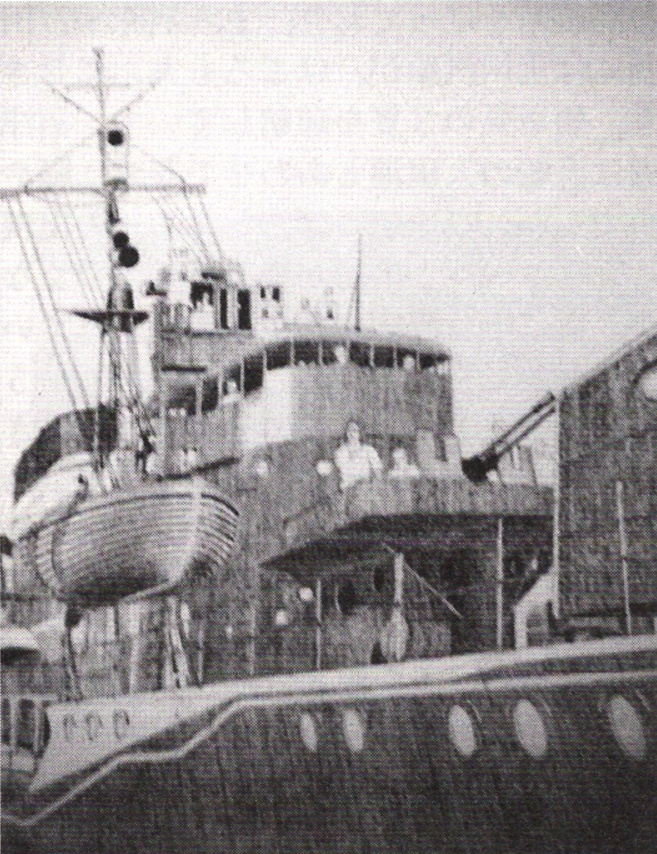
- Yūgumo docked in Yokosuka, August 1943

History

Empire of Japan
- Name: Yūgumo
- Builder: Maizuru Naval Arsenal
- Laid down: 12 June 1940
- Launched: 16 March 1941
- Completed: 5 December 1941
- Commissioned: 5 December 1941, 10th Destroyer Division
- Stricken: 1 December 1943
- Fate: Sunk 6 October 1943

General characteristics
- Class & type: Yūgumo-class destroyer
- Displacement: 2,077 long tons (2,110 t) standard; 2,520 long tons (2,560 t) battle condition
- Length: 119.15 m (390 ft 11 in)
- Beam: 10.8 m (35 ft 5 in)
- Draught: 3.75 m (12 ft 4 in)
- Speed: 35.5 knots (40.9 mph; 65.7 km/h)
- Complement: 225 (1941)
- Armament: 6 × 127 mm (5.0 in)/50 caliber DP guns; 4 × Type 96 25 mm (0.98 in) AA guns; 2 × 4 Type 92 (IV) 610 mm (24 in) torpedo tubes; 16 × Type 93 torpedoes; 18 depth charges

Yūgumo (夕雲; "Evening Clouds") was the lead ship of her class of destroyer built for the Imperial Japanese Navy during World War II.

== Design and description ==
The Yūgumo class was a repeat of the preceding Kagerō class with minor improvements that increased their anti-aircraft capabilities. Their crew numbered 228 officers and enlisted men. The ships measured 119.17 meters (391 ft 0 in) overall, with a beam of 10.8 meters (35 ft 5 in) and a draft of 3.76 meters (12 ft 4 in). They displaced 2,110 metric tons (2,080 long tons) at standard load and 2,560 metric tons (2,520 long tons) at deep load. The ships had two Kampon geared steam turbines, each driving one propeller shaft, using steam provided by three Kampon water-tube boilers. The turbines were rated at a total of 52,000 shaft horsepower (39,000 kW) for a designed speed of 35 knots (65 km/h; 40 mph).

The main armament of the Yūgumo class consisted of six Type 3 127-millimeter (5 in) guns in three twin-gun turrets, one superfiring pair aft and one turret forward of the superstructure. The guns were able to elevate up to 75° to increase their ability against aircraft, but their slow rate of fire, slow traversing speed, and the lack of any sort of high-angle fire-control system meant that they were virtually useless as anti-aircraft guns. They were built with four Type 96 25-millimeter (1 in) anti-aircraft guns in two twin-gun mounts, but more of these guns were added over the course of the war. The ships were also armed with eight 610-millimeter (24 in) torpedo tubes in a two quadruple traversing mounts; one reload was carried for each tube. Their anti-submarine weapons comprised two depth charge throwers for which 36 depth charges were carried.

== Construction and career ==
Yūgumo participated in the battles of Midway, the Eastern Solomons, and the Santa Cruz Islands. The destroyer made troop transport runs to Guadalcanal on 7 and 10 November 1942. She then made troop transport runs to Buna, Papua New Guinea on 17 and 22 November. The ship then performed troop evacuation runs to Guadalcanal on 1 and 4 February 1943. Three days later, Yūgumo took part in a troop evacuation run to the Russell Islands. The destroyer made troop transport runs to Kolombangara on 1 and 5 April.

On 29 July, Yūgumo evacuated 479 soldiers from Kiska. She performed a troop evacuation run to Kolombangara on 2 October 1943. On the night of 6–7 October 1943, Yūgumo was on a troop evacuation run to Vella Lavella. In the Battle of Vella Lavella, she charged U.S. destroyers, irreparably damaging USS Chevalier with a torpedo. She was sunk in turn by gunfire and at least one torpedo from Chevalier and USS Selfridge, 15 nautical miles (28 km; 17 mi) northwest of Vella Lavella (07°33′S 156°14′E), with 138 killed. U.S. PT boats rescued 78 survivors and another 25 reached friendly lines in an abandoned U.S. lifeboat, but Commander Osako was killed in action.
