= Japanese destroyer Kiyonami =

Yūgumo-class destroyer

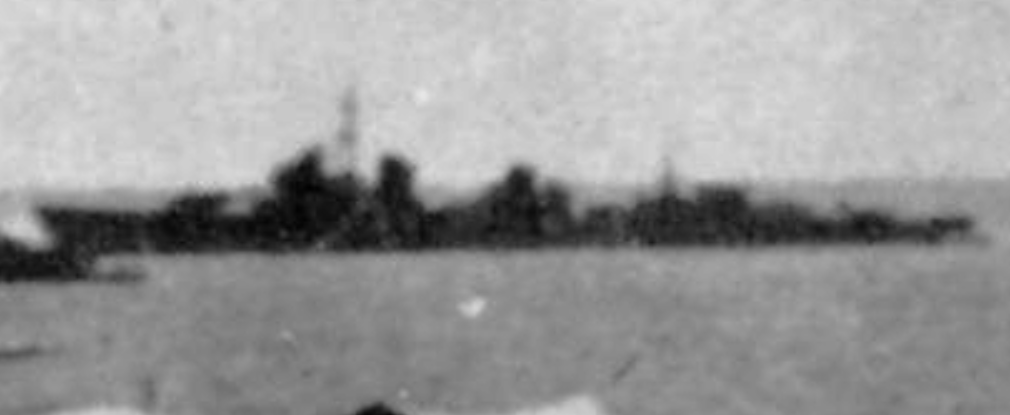
- Kiyonami anchored off Rabaul, July 1943

History

Empire of Japan
- Name: Kiyonami
- Ordered: 1939
- Builder: Uraga Dock Company
- Laid down: 5 October 1941
- Launched: 17 August 1942
- Completed: 25 January 1943
- Stricken: 15 October 1943
- Fate: Sunk in action, 20 July 1943

General characteristics
- Class & type: Yūgumo-class destroyer
- Displacement: 2,520 long tons (2,560 t)
- Length: 119.15 m (390 ft 11 in)
- Beam: 10.8 m (35 ft 5 in)
- Draught: 3.75 m (12 ft 4 in)
- Speed: 35 knots (40 mph; 65 km/h)
- Complement: 228
- Armament: 6 × 127 mm (5.0 in)/50 caliber DP guns; up to 28 × Type 96 25 mm (0.98 in) AA guns; up to 4 × 13.2 mm (0.52 in) AA guns; 8 × 610 mm (24 in) torpedo tubes for Type 93 torpedoes; 36 depth charges

Service record
- Operations: Battle of Kolombangara
- Victories: USS Gwin (1941)

Kiyonami (清波; "Clear Wave") was a Yūgumo-class destroyer of the Imperial Japanese Navy. She saw numerous escorting duties during WWII, and notably played a major role at the battle of Kolombangara, where she helped to sink the American destroyer USS Gwin and cripple the light cruisers USS Honolulu and USS Saint Louis. However, on 20 July 1943, Kiyonami was sunk by land based allied aircraft with the loss of all but one sailor.

== Design and description ==
The Yūgumo class was a repeat of the preceding Kagerō class with minor improvements that increased their anti-aircraft capabilities. Their crew numbered 228 officers and enlisted men. The ships measured 119.17 meters (391 ft 0 in) overall, with a beam of 10.8 meters (35 ft 5 in) and a draft of 3.76 meters (12 ft 4 in). They displaced 2,110 metric tons (2,080 long tons) at standard load and 2,560 metric tons (2,520 long tons) at deep load. The ships had two Kampon geared steam turbines, each driving one propeller shaft, using steam provided by three Kampon water-tube boilers. The turbines were rated at a total of 52,000 shaft horsepower (39,000 kW) for a designed speed of 35 knots (65 km/h; 40 mph).

The main armament of the Yūgumo class consisted of six Type 3 127-millimeter (5.0 in) guns in three twin-gun turrets, one superfiring pair aft and one turret forward of the superstructure. The guns were able to elevate up to 75° to increase their ability against aircraft, but their slow rate of fire, slow traversing speed, and the lack of any sort of high-angle fire-control system meant that they were virtually useless as anti-aircraft guns. They were built with four Type 96 25-millimeter (1.0 in) anti-aircraft guns in two twin-gun mounts, but more of these guns were added over the course of the war. The ships were also armed with eight 610-millimeter (24.0 in) torpedo tubes in a two quadruple traversing mounts; one reload was carried for each tube. Their anti-submarine weapons comprised two depth charge throwers for which 36 depth charges were carried.

== Construction and career ==
Kiyonami was completed on 25 January 1943, and was assigned to the 31st destroyer division (alongside Naganami and Makinami), and saw her first active service escorting the axillary cruisers Bangkok Maru and Saigon Maru from Yokosuka to various occupied territories throughout March, then saw out the next few months of her career partaking in convoy escorting duties.

=== Battle of Kolombangara ===
Diagram of a Yūgumo class destroyer like Kiyonami

On the 9th of July, Kiyonami departed as part of a protection force for a Japanese troop transport run consisting of a destroyer flotilla made up by herself and the destroyers Yukikaze, Hamakaze, and Yūgure, led by the light cruiser Jintsū and the elderly destroyer Mikazuki. While still underway on the 12th, the force was intercepted by a group of three allied light cruisers, USS Honolulu, USS Saint Louis, and HMZNS Leander, supported by ten destroyers. During the opening stages of the battle of Kolombangara, Jintsū fired her searchlights, enabling the three allied cruisers to engage her. A hellfire of 6-inch (152 mm) shell hits mostly from Honolulu and Saint Louis blasted Jintsū into a floating wreck, enabling her to be finished off by the destroyer USS Taylor's torpedo battery.

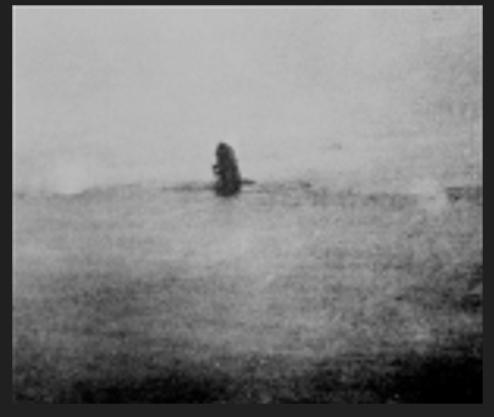
Kiyonami sinking by the stern after air attacks, 20 July 1943

However, Kiyonami and the other destroyers went undetected, and quickly swerved into firing formation to engage the enemy. Kiyonami, Yukikaze, Hamakaze, and Yūgure all fired their torpedo batteries, and several minutes later one of Yukikaze's torpedoes hit Leander, damaging her so badly she could not be repaired in time to take further part in WWII, and forcing her out of the engagement. Kiyonami and the others swerved away retreated from the battle scene to reload their torpedoes, which took around 10 minutes, and quickly sailed back to fight the enemy formation. When detected, every US ship targeted Yukikaze, which was straddled and near missed several times, but not directly hit by a single shell. In turn, Kiyonami fired her torpedoes again simultaneously with the other destroyers, and watched as multiple made their mark. Long lance torpedoes quickly found their targets, sinking the destroyer USS Gwin, twisting the bow of Saint Louis, and completely blasting off the bow of Honolulu, taking both cruisers out of action. Kiyonami then retreated from the battlefield without damage. While the battle was a costly victory with the loss of Jintsū, it was a victory none the less. Alongside all the allied ships sunk or damaged, all the destroyer transports completed their mission unattacked.

=== Sinking ===
On 20 July Kiyonami was on another troop transport run to Kolombangara. She was sunk by U.S. Army B-25s while rescuing the crew of the destroyer Yūgure, 42 miles (68 km) north-northwest of Kolombangara (07°13′S 156°45′E). About sixty men survived the sinking, but only one was rescued after several days, leaving only one survivor from Kiyonami's crew of 241 men, and no survivors from Yūgure's crew of 228.
