= Japanese destroyer Tamanami =

Yūgumo-class destroyer

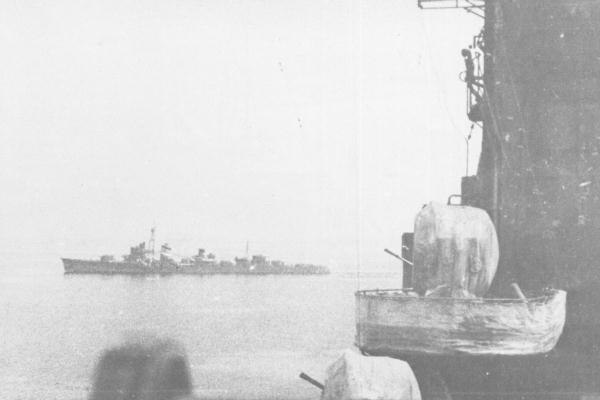
- Tamanami anchored off Hashirajima in the Spring of 1943, taken from the battleship Nagato

History

Empire of Japan
- Name: Tamanami
- Builder: Fujinagata Shipyards, Osaka
- Laid down: 16 March 1942
- Launched: 20 December 1942
- Completed: 30 April 1943
- Stricken: 10 September 1944
- Fate: Torpedoed and sunk, 7 July 1944

General characteristics
- Class & type: Yūgumo-class destroyer
- Displacement: 2,520 long tons (2,560 t)
- Length: 119.15 m (390 ft 11 in)
- Beam: 10.8 m (35 ft 5 in)
- Draft: 3.75 m (12 ft 4 in)
- Propulsion: Steam engine(s)
- Speed: 35.5 kn (65.7 km/h; 40.9 mph)
- Complement: 228
- Armament: 6 × 127 mm (5.0 in)/50 cal dual purpose guns; up to 28 × Type 96 25 mm (0.98 in) anti-aircraft guns; up to 4 × 13.2 mm (0.52 in) AA guns; 8 × 610 mm (24 in) torpedo tubes for Type 93 torpedoes; 36 × depth charges

Tamanami (玉波; "Jade Wave") was a Yūgumo-class destroyer of the Imperial Japanese Navy.

== Design and description ==
The Yūgumo class was a repeat of the preceding Kagerō class with minor improvements that increased their anti-aircraft capabilities. Their crew numbered 228 officers and enlisted men. The ships measured 119.17 meters (391 ft 0 in) overall, with a beam of 10.8 meters (35 ft 5 in) and a draft of 3.76 meters (12 ft 4 in). They displaced 2,110 metric tons (2,080 long tons) at standard load and 2,560 metric tons (2,520 long tons) at deep load. The ships had two Kampon geared steam turbines, each driving one propeller shaft, using steam provided by three Kampon water-tube boilers. The turbines were rated at a total of 52,000 shaft horsepower (39,000 kW) for a designed speed of 35 knots (65 km/h; 40 mph), though they managed 35.5 knots on trials.

The main armament of the Yūgumo class consisted of six Type 3 127-millimeter (5.0 in) guns in three twin-gun turrets, one superfiring pair aft and one turret forward of the superstructure. The guns were able to elevate up to 75° to increase their ability against aircraft, but their slow rate of fire, slow traversing speed, and the lack of any sort of high-angle fire-control system meant that they were virtually useless as anti-aircraft guns. They were built with four Type 96 25-millimeter (1.0 in) anti-aircraft guns in two twin-gun mounts, but more of these guns were added over the course of the war. The ships were also armed with eight 610-millimeter (24.0 in) torpedo tubes in a two quadruple traversing mounts; one reload was carried for each tube. Their anti-submarine weapons comprised two depth charge throwers for which 36 depth charges were carried.

== Career ==
Tamanami was commissioned at Osaka on 30 April 1943 in the middle of World War II for Japan, and was thus immediately relegated to destroyer division 11 for training duties, transiting between Kure and Hashirajima operating alongside the first fleet. These operations were kept up for several months, and it was on 8 June that Tamanami was anchored off Hashirajima when the battleship Mutsu suddenly and mysteriously erupted in a magazine explosion and sank in harbor, prompting the destroyer to assist the sinking Mutsu, but she didn't manage to rescue any survivors.

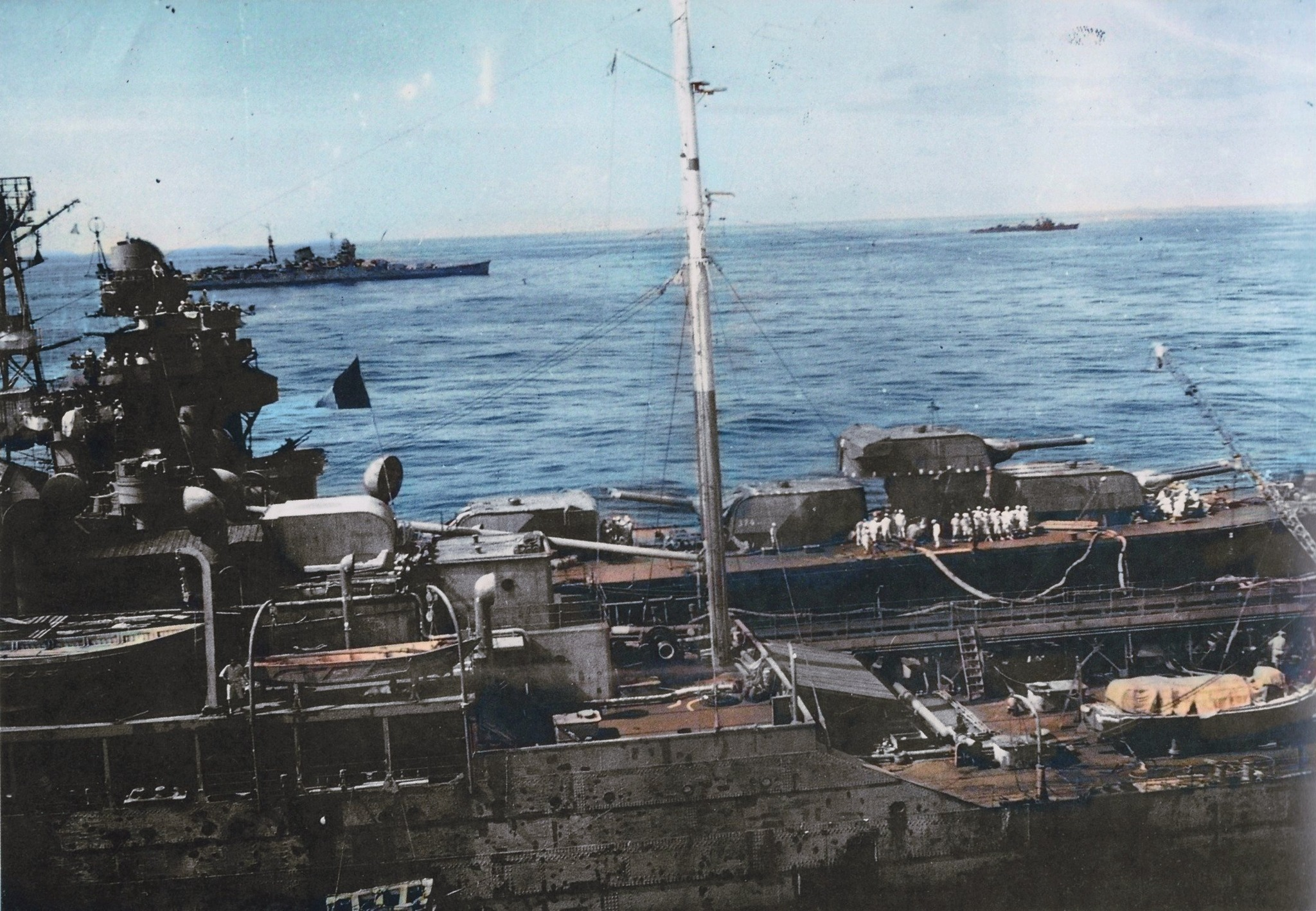
Japanese ships anchored off Tawi-Tawi shortly before the battle of the Philippine Sea, 17 June 1944. Tamanami is the destroyer to the right

On 23 June, Tamanami departed Hashirajima to rescue survivors from the sunken transport ship Sagara Maru, then on the 28th practiced towing the battleship Nagato, managing a speed of 12 knots. From 10–15 July, Tamanami escorted seaplane tenders from Yokosuka to Truk, then departed on a troop transport run to Nauru and back to Truk, then escorted a troop convoy to Palau and back. From 18–25 September, Tamanami escorted the combined fleet on a mission to counterattack US carrier raids, but this did not yield combat. From 14–19 October, she escorted the aircraft carrier Jun'yō to Truk, then spent November operating with heavy cruiser groups. More escorting duties rounded out 1943 before Tamanami returned to Kure.

With the start of 1944, Tamanami departed Kure on escorting duties, and returned to Yokosuka on 15 February escorting the battleship Musashi. From 22 March to 2 April, Tamanami escorted a troop convoy from Japan to Saipan, and on 20 April returned to Yokosuka. From 10–16 May, Tamanami escorted Musashi and several light carriers to Tawitawi, and from 19–20 June escorted Admiral Kurita's vanguard force at the battle of the Philippine Sea, where the force came under light air attacks from US aircraft carriers, but Tamanami was not damaged. Afterwards, from 23–29 June, the destroyer escorted the oil tanker Kokuyo Maru from Okinawa to Singapore.

On 7 July, Tamanami was engaged in escort duties, accompanying the transport vessel Kokuyo Maru on a voyage from Singapore to Manila. Unbeknownst to the Japanese convoy, the American submarine USS Mingo was conducting patrol operations in the vicinity. Upon sighting the enemy vessels, USS Mingo maneuvered into an intercept course. Tamanami detected the submarine and responded by deploying depth charges; however, the attack failed to inflict damage. In turn, Mingo launched a salvo of torpedoes at Tamanami, all of which were successfully evaded. Approximately one hour later, Mingo repositioned for a second attack and fired four additional torpedoes. Three of the torpedoes struck Tamanami, causing a series of catastrophic explosions. The destroyer sank rapidly. There were no survivors.
