= Yūgumo-class destroyer =

Class of destroyers, Japanese imperial Navy

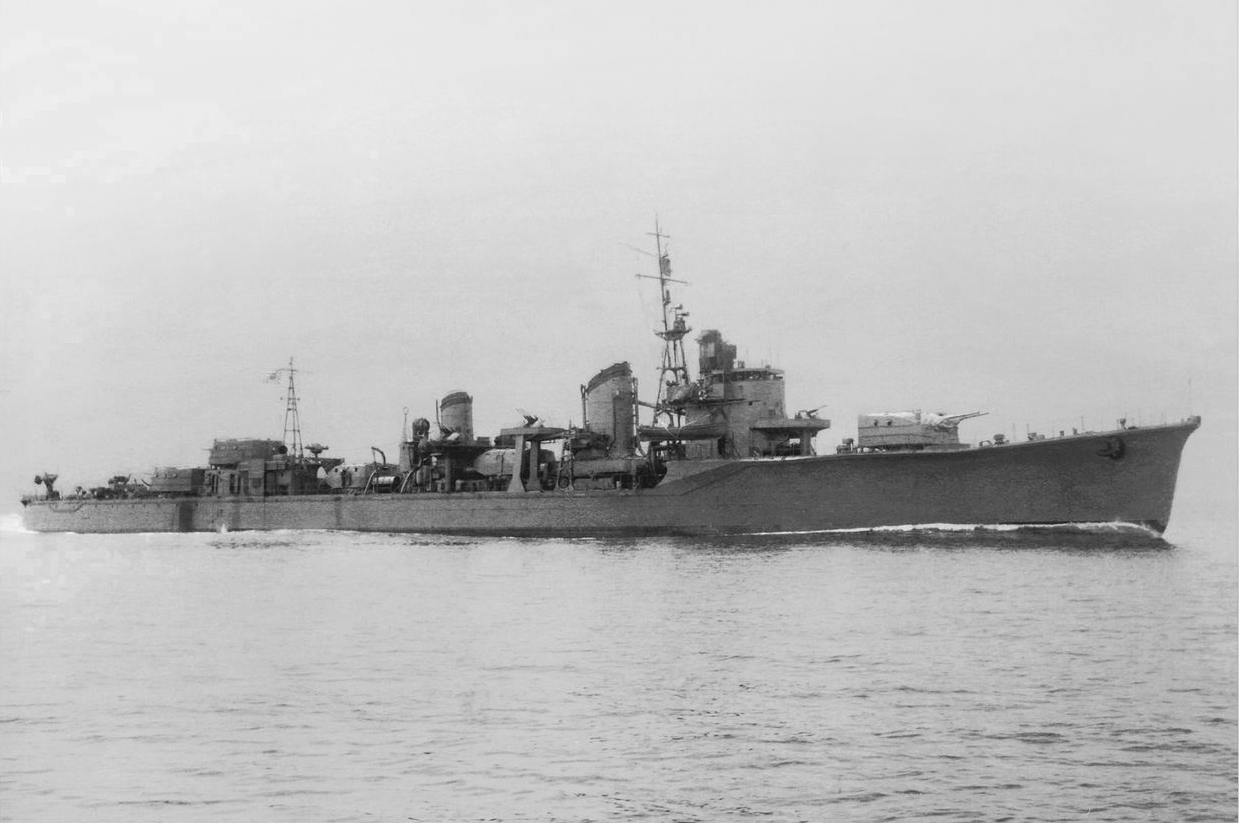
- Kiyoshimo off Uraga on 15 May 1944

Class overview
- Name: Yūgumo-class destroyer
- Builders: Fujinagata Shipyards (7); Maizuru Naval Arsenal (6); Uraga Dock Company (6)
- Operators: Imperial Japanese Navy
- Preceded by: Kagerō class
- Succeeded by: Akizuki class; Shimakaze
- Built: 1940–1944
- In commission: 1941–1945
- Planned: 14 (1939) + 16 (1941) + 8 (1942)
- Completed: 19
- Cancelled: 19
- Lost: 19

General characteristics
- Displacement: 2,077 tons standard, 2,520 tons battle condition
- Length: 119.03 m (390 ft 6 in) overall, 117.00 m (383 ft 10 in) waterline
- Beam: 10.80 m (35 ft 5 in)
- Draft: 3.76 m (12 ft 4 in)
- Propulsion: 3 × Kampon water tube boilers, 2 × Kampon impulse geared turbines, 52,000 shp (39 MW), 2 shafts
- Speed: 35.5 knots (40.9 mph; 65.7 km/h)
- Range: 5,000 nmi (9,300 km) at 18 kn (21 mph; 33 km/h)
- Complement: 225 (Yūgumo, 1941)
- Armament: (Yūgumo, December 1941); 6 × Type 3 127 mm 50 caliber naval guns (3×2); 4 × 25 mm Type 96 AA guns; 8 × Type 92 torpedo tubes (2×4); 16 × 610 mm Type 93 torpedoes; 18 × depth charges; (Asashimo, April 1945); 6 × Type 3 127 mm 50 caliber naval guns (3×2); over 20 × 25 mm Type 96 AA guns; 8 × Type 92 torpedo tubes (2×4); 16 × 610 mm Type 93 torpedoes; 36 × depth charges

The Yūgumo-class destroyers (夕雲型駆逐艦, Yūgumo-gata kuchikukan) were a group of 19 destroyers built for the Imperial Japanese Navy during World War II. The IJN called them Destroyer Type-A (甲型駆逐艦,, Kō-gata Kuchikukan) from their plan name. No ships of the class survived the war.

== Background ==
The Yūgumo class was a repeat of the preceding Kagerō class with minor improvements that increased their anti-aircraft capabilities. The first 11 ships of the class were ordered as part of the 1939 4th Naval Armaments Supplement Programme. Another 16 ships (the Hayanami sub-class) were ordered as ships #340 to #355 as part of the 1941 Rapid Naval Armaments Supplement Programme, but of these eight were canceled before being laid down. Another eight ships (the Kai-Yūgumo sub-class) were planned as ships #5041 to #5048 under the 1942 Modified 5th Naval Armaments Supplement Programme, but these were also canceled.

== Design and description ==
The Yūgumo class was 45 tons heavier and a few feet longer than the Kagerō class, distinguishable in silhouette primarily by the shape of the bridge. The Yūgumo class had a forward slope on the bridge, which was intended to reduce wind resistance and improve stability. Another difference was that the Yūgumo-class vessels were built by three different shipyards, and there were minor differences between individual ships, depending on the builder and when the ship was built.

The general specifications for the Yūgumo class was a 119.17-meter (391 ft 0 in) overall length, with a beam of 10.8 meters (35 ft 5 in) and a draft of 3.76 meters (12 ft 4 in). They displaced 2,110 metric tons (2,080 long tons) at standard load and 2,560 metric tons (2,520 long tons) at deep load. Their crew numbered 228 officers and enlisted men.

The ships had two Kampon geared steam turbines, each driving one propeller shaft, using steam provided by three Kampon water-tube boilers. The turbines were rated at a total of 52,000 shaft horsepower (39,000 kW) for a designed speed of 35 knots (65 km/h; 40 mph).

The main battery of the Yūgumo class consisted of six Type 3 127-millimeter (5.0 in) guns in three twin-gun turrets, one superfiring pair aft and one turret forward of the superstructure. The guns were in a new type of mount (known as the "D" mount) which was able to elevate up to 75° to increase their performance against aircraft; however, their slow rate of fire, slow traversing speed, and the lack of any sort of high-angle fire-control system meant that they were virtually useless as anti-aircraft guns. Despite this, the process of replacing the No. 2 gun turret with anti-aircraft guns was never carried out on any ship of this class. The ships were also armed with eight 610-millimeter (24.0 in) torpedo tubes in two quadruple traversing mounts; one reload was carried for each tube. Their anti-submarine weapons comprised two depth charge throwers for which 36 depth charges were carried.

As built, the Yūgumo class had four Type 96 25-millimeter (1.0 in) anti-aircraft guns in two twin-mounts forward of the aft smokestack. as with other destroyer classes, as the Pacific War progressed, anti-aircraft armaments were increased, averaging over 20 by the Battle of Leyte Gulf. From 1943, two triple-mounts replaced the dual mounts aft and one twin-mount Type 96 was added forward of the bridge and a Type 22 radar. Units surviving into 1944 had a second pair of 25mm triple-mounts added on a platform behind the forward smokestack since they retained their No. 2 gun turrets. Uniquely, the Naganami carried a M2 Browning 50 caliber machine gun captured from the wrecked American submarine USS Darter on 25 October 1944 as some sort of war prize. The six units surviving into late 1944 received up to twelve additional single-mount Type 96s and a Type 13 radar. Kiyoshimo also received a number of Type 93 13mm machine guns.

== Ships in class ==
Construction data
Ship	Kanji	Ship #	Shipyard	Laid down	Launched	Completed	Fate
Akigumo	秋雲	115					Built as part of the Kagerō class
Yūgumo	夕雲	116	Maizuru Naval Arsenal	12 June 1940	16 March 1941	5 December 1941	Sunk, Battle of Vella Lavella, 6 October 1943
Makigumo	巻雲	117	Fujinagata Shipyards	13 December 1940	5 November 1941	14 March 1942	Sunk after surface action, 1 February 1943
Kazagumo	風雲	118	Uraga Dock Company	23 December 1940	26 September 1941	28 March 1942	Torpedoed at Davao Gulf, 8 June 1944
Naganami	長波	119	Fujinagata Shipyards	5 April 1941	5 March 1942	30 June 1942	Air attack, Ormoc Bay, 11 November 1944
Makinami	巻波	120	Maizuru Naval Arsenal	11 April 1941	27 December 1941	8 August 1942	Sunk, Battle of Cape St. George, 25 November 1943
Takanami	高波	121	Uraga Dock Company	29 May 1941	16 March 1942	31 August 1942	Sunk, Battle of Tassafaronga, 30 November 1942
Ōnami	大波	122	Fujinagata Shipyards	15 November 1941	13 August 1942	29 December 1942	Sunk, Battle of Cape St. George, 25 November 1943
Kiyonami	清波	123	Uraga Dock Company	15 October 1941	17 August 1942	25 January 1943	Air attack, NNW of Kolombangara 20 July 1943
Tamanami	玉波	124	Fujinagata Shipyards	16 March 1942	26 December 1942	30 April 1943	Torpedoed, WSW of Manila, 7 July 1944
Suzunami	涼波	126	Uraga Dock Company	27 March 1942	26 December 1942	27 July 1943	Air attack, Rabaul, 11 November 1943
Fujinami	藤波	127	Fujinagata Shipyards	25 August 1942	20 April 1943	31 July 1943	Air attack N of Iloilo, 27 October 1944
—N/a	—N/a	128–129	—N/a	—N/a	—N/a	—N/a	Dummy budget covering Yamato-class battleships
Hayanami	早波	340	Maizuru Naval Arsenal	15 January 1942	19 December 1942	31 July 1943	Torpedoed near Tawi-Tawi, Philippines, 7 June 1944
Hamanami	濱波	341	Maizuru Naval Arsenal	28 April 1942	18 April 1943	15 October 1943	Air attack, Ormoc Bay, 11 November 1944
Okinami	沖波	342	Maizuru Naval Arsenal	5 August 1942	18 July 1943	10 December 1943	Air attack W of Manila, 13 November 1944
Kishinami	岸波	343	Uraga Dock Company	29 August 1942	19 August 1943	3 December 1943	Torpedoed W of Palawan Island, 4 December 1944
Asashimo	朝霜	344	Fujinagata Shipyards	21 January 1943	18 July 1943	27 November 1943	Air attack during Operation Ten-Go, 7 April 1945
Hayashimo	早霜	345	Maizuru Naval Arsenal	20 January 1943	20 October 1943	20 February 1944	Air attack off Semirara Island, 26 October 1944
Akishimo	秋霜	346	Fujinagata Shipyards	3 May 1943	5 December 1943	11 March 1944	Air attack, Manila, 13 November 1944
Kiyoshimo	清霜	347	Uraga Dock Company	16 March 1943	29 February 1944	15 May 1944	Torpedoed after air attack, 26 December 1944
Taekaze	妙風	348	—N/a	—N/a	—N/a	—N/a	Cancelled on 11 August 1943
Kiyokaze	清風	349	—N/a	—N/a	—N/a	—N/a	Cancelled on 11 August 1943
Murakaze	村風	350	—N/a	—N/a	—N/a	—N/a	Cancelled on 11 August 1943
Satokaze	里風	351	—N/a	—N/a	—N/a	—N/a	Cancelled on 11 August 1943
Yamagiri	山霧	352	—N/a	—N/a	—N/a	—N/a	Cancelled on 11 August 1943
Umigiri	海霧	353	—N/a	—N/a	—N/a	—N/a	Cancelled on 11 August 1943
Tanigiri	谷霧	354	—N/a	—N/a	—N/a	—N/a	Cancelled on 11 August 1943
Kawagiri	川霧	355	—N/a	—N/a	—N/a	—N/a	Cancelled on 11 August 1943
Yamasame	山雨	5041	—N/a	—N/a	—N/a	—N/a	Kai-Yūgumo class cancelled on 11 August 1943
Akisame	秋雨	5042	—N/a	—N/a	—N/a	—N/a	Kai-Yūgumo class cancelled on 11 August 1943
Natsusame	夏雨	5043	—N/a	—N/a	—N/a	—N/a	Kai-Yūgumo class cancelled on 11 August 1943
Hayasame	早雨	5044	—N/a	—N/a	—N/a	—N/a	Kai-Yūgumo class cancelled on 11 August 1943
Takashio	高潮	5045	—N/a	—N/a	—N/a	—N/a	Kai-Yūgumo class cancelled on 11 August 1943
Akishio	秋潮	5046	—N/a	—N/a	—N/a	—N/a	Kai-Yūgumo class cancelled on 11 August 1943
Harushio	春潮	5047	—N/a	—N/a	—N/a	—N/a	Kai-Yūgumo class cancelled on 11 August 1943
Wakashio	若潮	5048	—N/a	—N/a	—N/a	—N/a	Kai-Yūgumo class cancelled on 11 August 1943

== Service ==
Yūgumo was the only ship of her class completed before Japan's entry into WW2 on 5 December 1941, just two days before the attack on Pearl Harbor. She and the following ships of her class saw a variety of escorting duties before Yūgumo, Makigumo, and Kazagumo escorting carriers during the battle of Midway, where they assisted the sinking aircraft carrier Hiryū. In turn, Makigumo's crew committed a war crime when they, albeit very reluctantly, murdered the downed USS Enterprise pilots Frank W. O'Flaherty and Bruno Gaido. Off to the Guadalcanal campaign, more escorting missions ensued, but mixed with troop and supply transport missions, plus escorting carriers at the battles of the Eastern Solomons and Santa Cruz. In the latter battle, the class earned its first notable surface action when Makigumo assisted in finishing off the crippled aircraft carrier USS Hornet. After escorting transports during the naval battle of Guadalcanal, Naganami, Takanami, and Makinami all saw notable action at the battle of Tassafarona, Naganami serving as Admiral Tanaka's flagship. Takanami was sunk by American cruiser gunfire, accounting for the class's first loss, but not before unleashing a torpedo spread that crippled the heavy cruisers USS Minneapolis and USS New Orleans, blowing their bows clean off, while Makinami helped to sink the heavy cruiser USS Northampton.

With the start of 1943, several ships of the class took part in the evacuation of Guadalcanal. Makinami was crippled by air attacks and forced into several months of repair, while Makigumo was more fatally lured into a minefield by American PT Boats where she blew up and sank. The class saw more escorting and transport missions throughout the following months, until Kiyonami took part in the battle of Kolombangara, where she combined torpedoes with other destroyers to sink the destroyer USS Gwin and cripple the light cruisers USS Honolulu and USS Saint Louis. However, just a week later she was sunk by land based aircraft with just one survivor. On 7 October, Yūgumo herself was sunk at the battle of Vella Lavella by gunfire and torpedoes from the destroyers USS Chevalier, O'Bannon, and Selfridge, but not before firing a torpedo spread that hit and sank Chevalier (and indirectly damaged O'Bannon). In November, Suzunami was sunk by land-based aircraft in Rabaul, while Ōnami and Makinami were sunk by gunfire and torpedoes from the destroyers USS Charles Ausburne, Claxton, and Dyson at the battle of Cape Saint George.

1944 saw the completion of the last ship of the Yūgumo class, the Kiyoshimo, on 15 May 1944. In February, Asashimo depth charged and sank the submarine USS Trout, their last victory over an enemy warship. To return the favor, later that June Kazagumo was torpedoed and sunk by the submarine USS Hake, while Hayanami was sunk by the submarine USS Harder. Shortly afterwards, several Yūgumo class destroyers escorted aircraft carriers at the battle of the Philippine Sea, but in July Tamanami was sunk by the submarine USS Mingo. The remaining ships of the Yūgumo class took part in Admiral Kurita's center force at the battle of Leyte Gulf, where Naganami and Asashimo left the battle early to escort the crippled heavy cruiser Takao, while Kiyoshimo was forced to retire after being damaged by air attacks. Several ships were involved in the battle off Samar, but did little of note. In the final stages of the battle, Hayashimo and Fujinami were sunk by carrier aircraft, while Naganami inspected the wrecked submarine USS Darter, which had run aground, failing to scuttle the wreck while stealing a M2 Browning 50 caliber machine gun from the wreck as a war prize. In November, Okinami and Akishimo were sunk in harbor by land based aircraft, while Hamanami and Naganami were sunk by carrier aircraft at the battle of Ormoc Bay. Rounding out 1944 in December, Kishinami was torpedoed and sunk by the submarine USS Flasher, while Kiyoshimo was crippled by land based aircraft, then finished off by the torpedo boat PT-223.

Asashimo was the only Yūgumo class destroyer to survive into 1945. However, she met her end escorting the battleship Yamato during that ship's doomed final mission, departing Japan on the 6th of April. However, the next day Asashimo developed engine trouble and began to fall out of formation. When early 400 carrier aircraft attacked, a division of torpedo bombers from the light carrier USS San Jacinto pounced on the vulnerable Asashimo and sank the destroyer with all hands, bringing an end to the Yūgumo class destroyers.

== Gallery ==
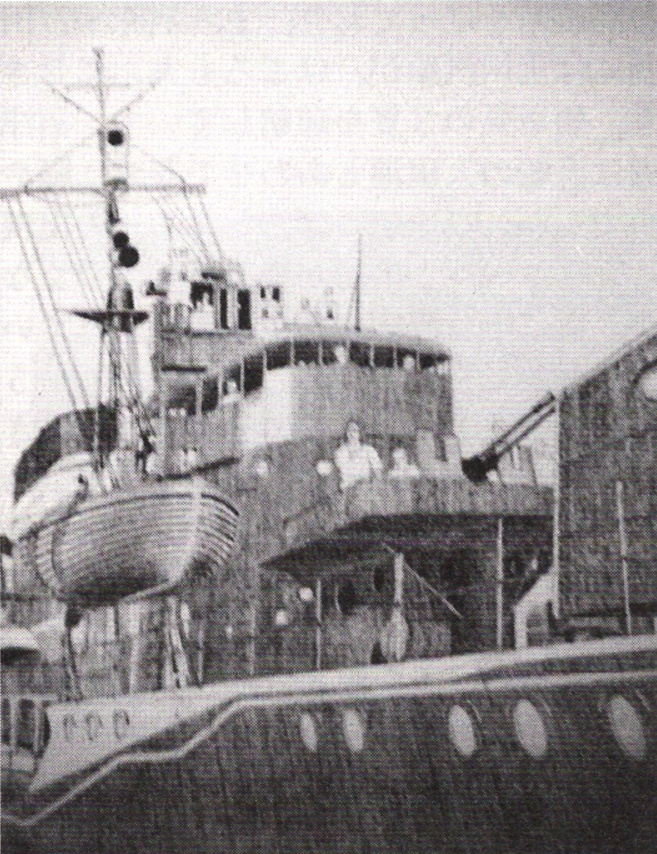
Yūgumo

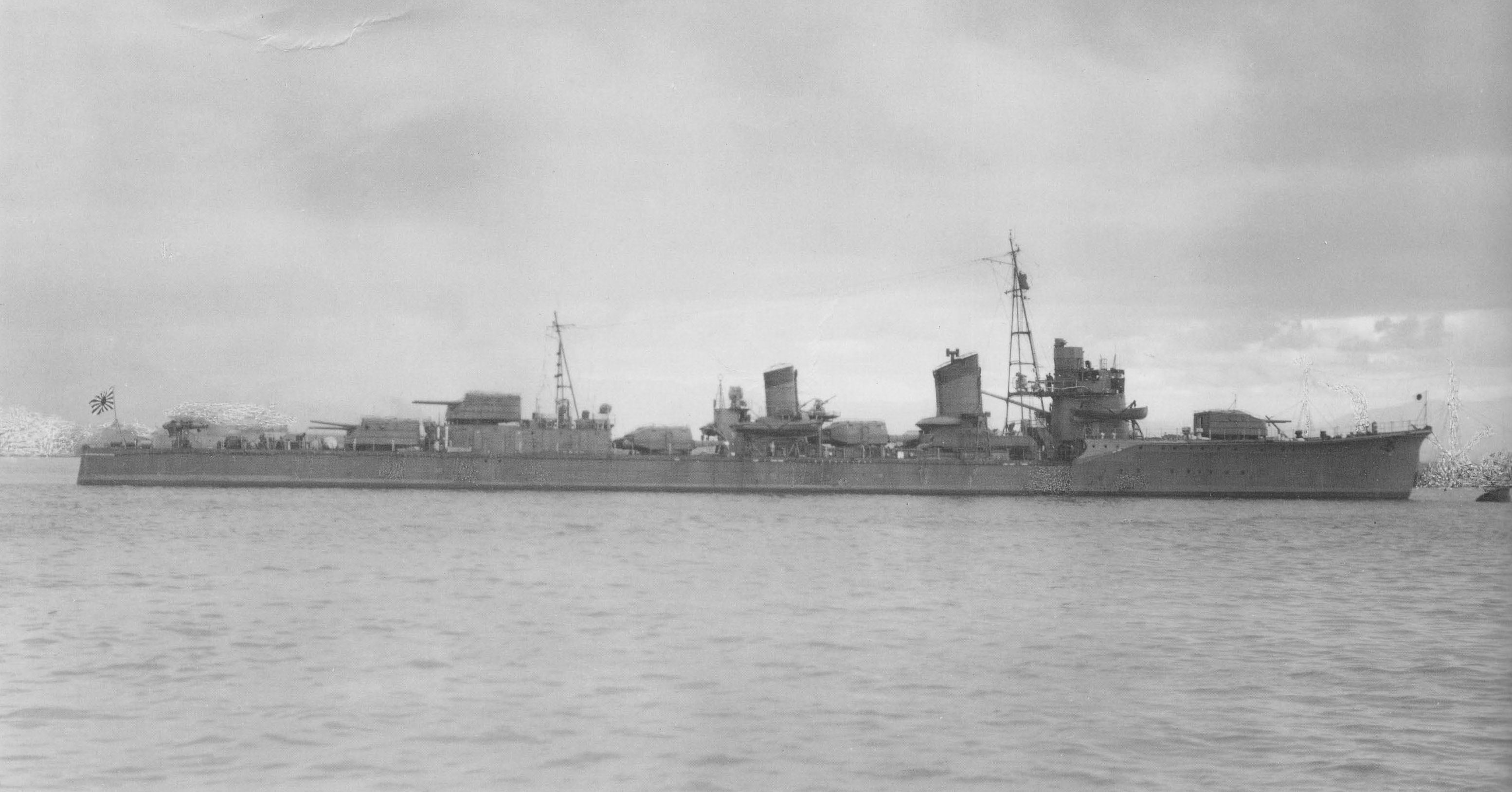
Makigumo

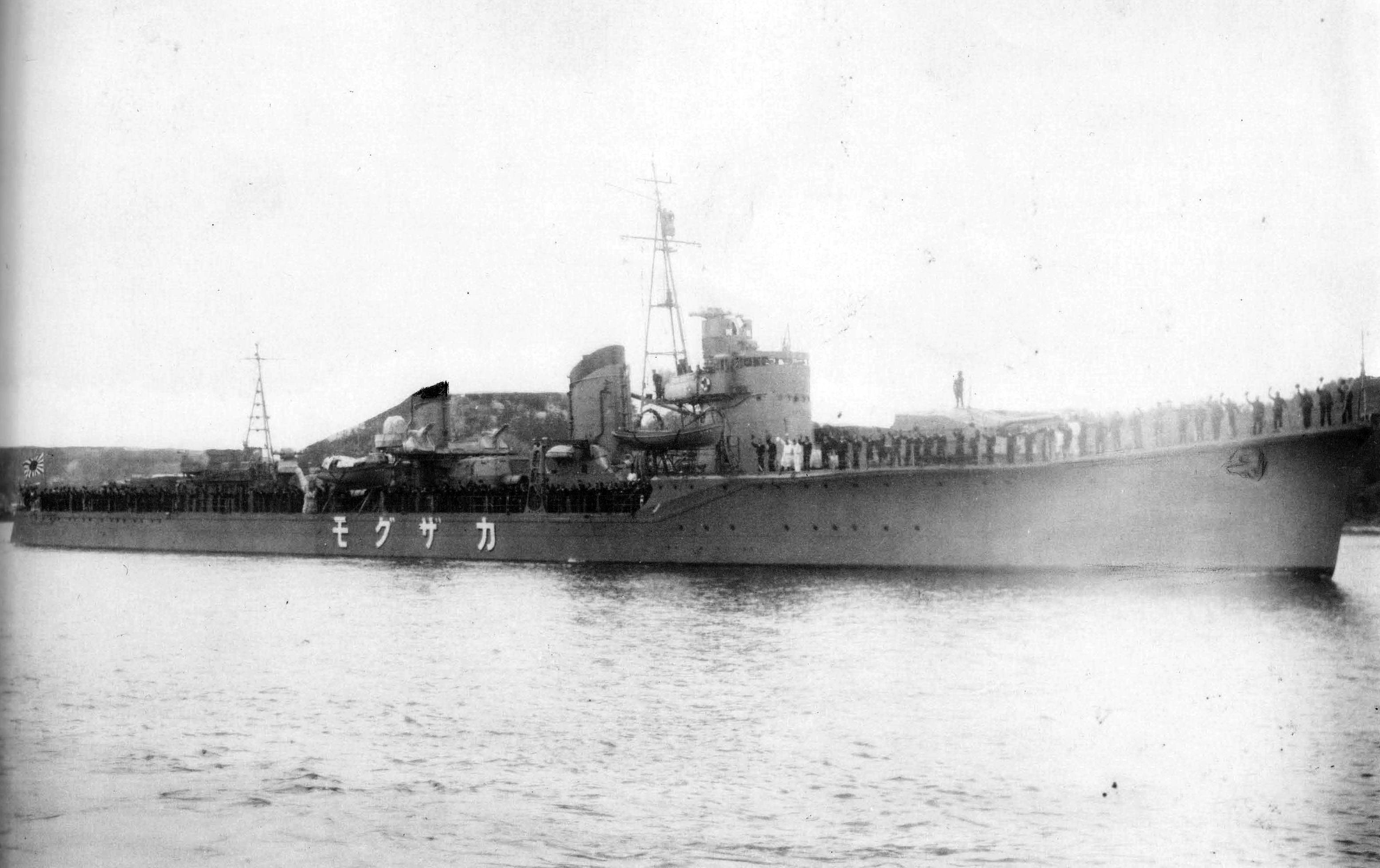
Kazagumo

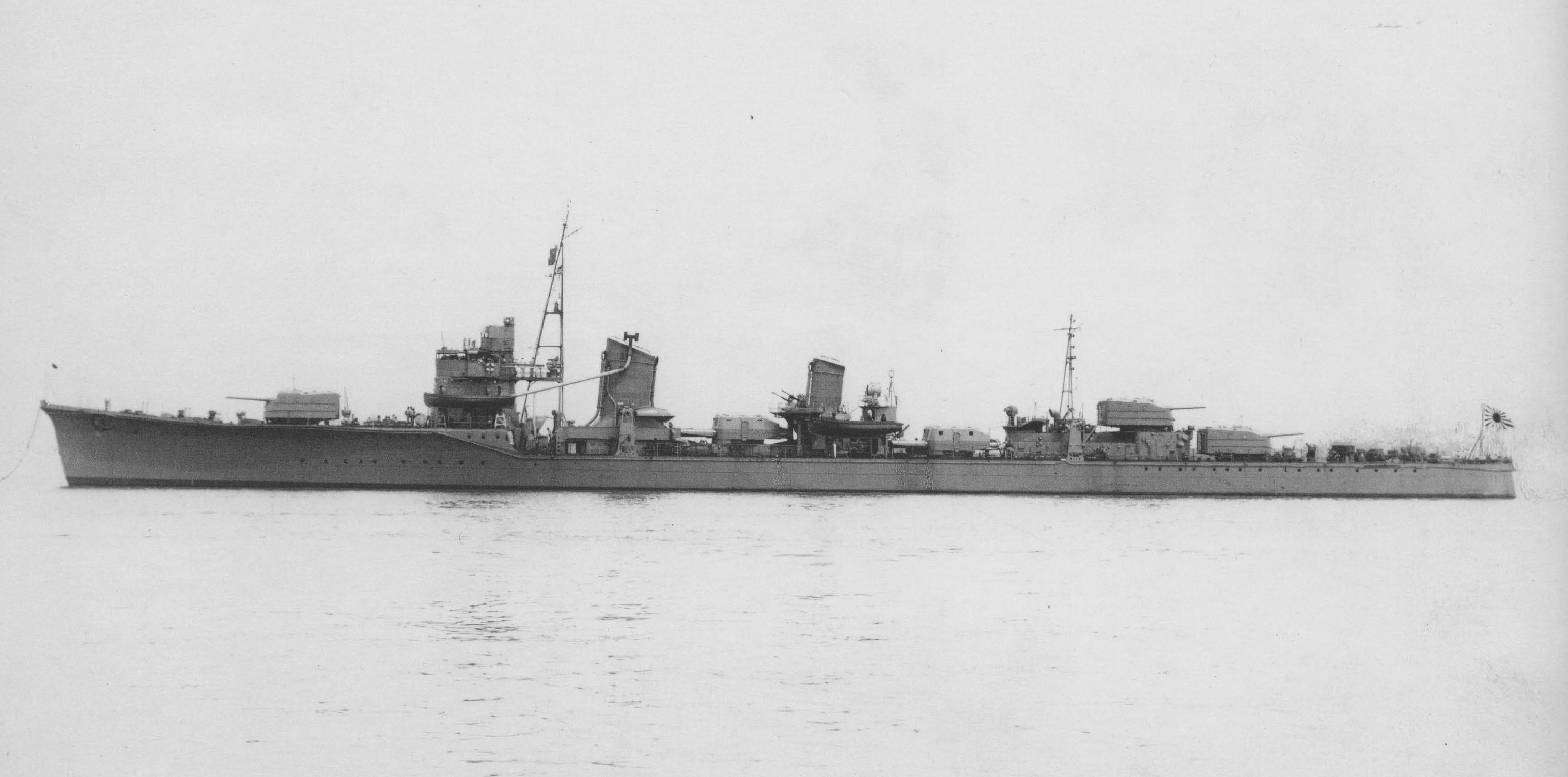
Naganami

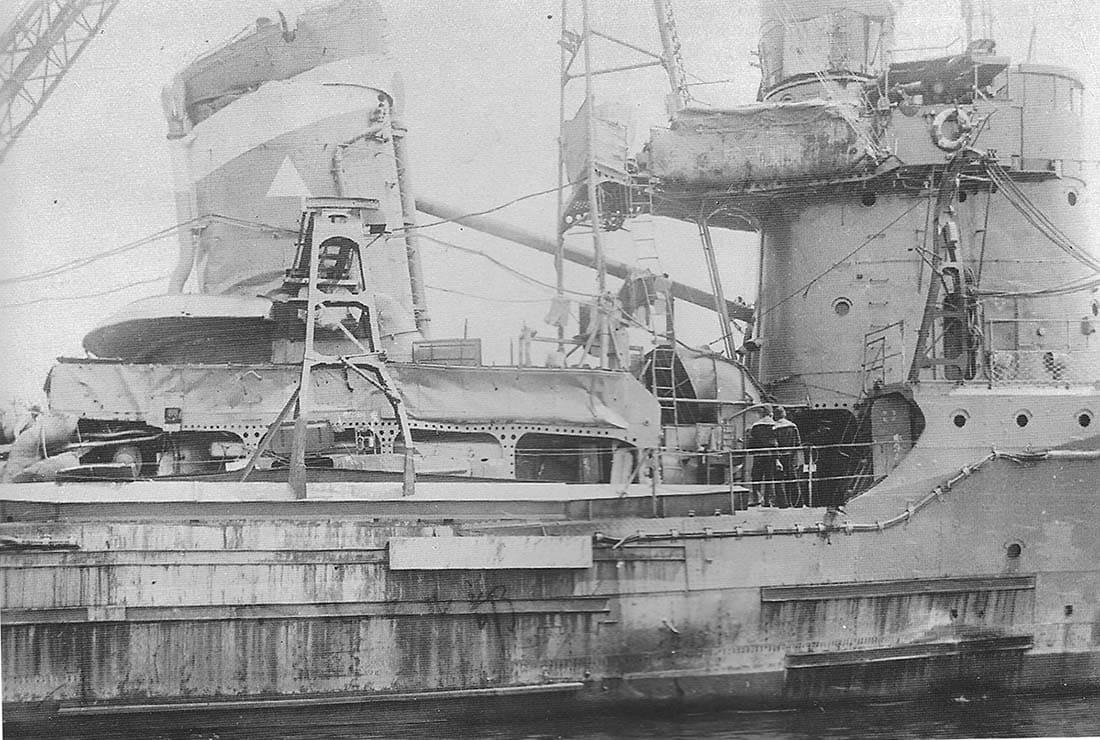
Makinami

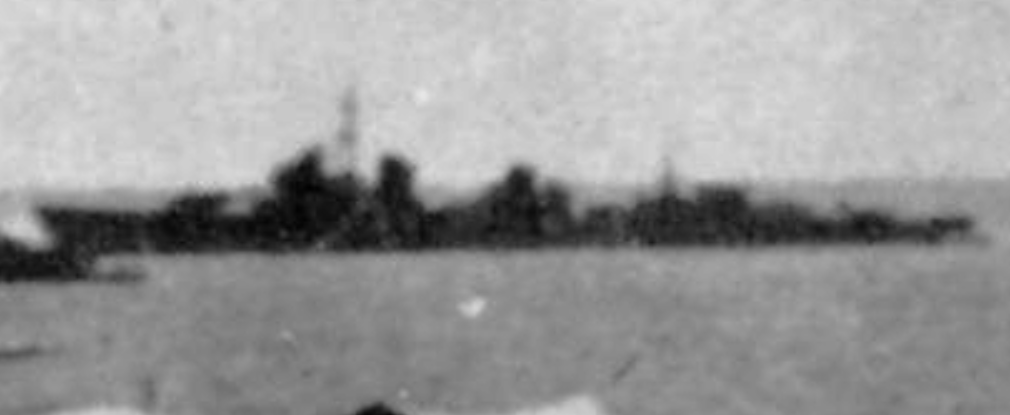
Kiyonami

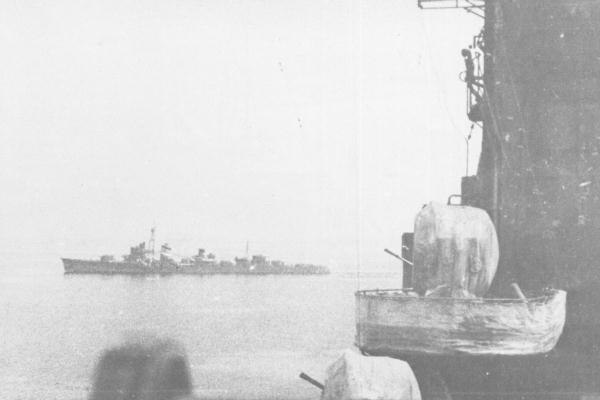
Tamanami

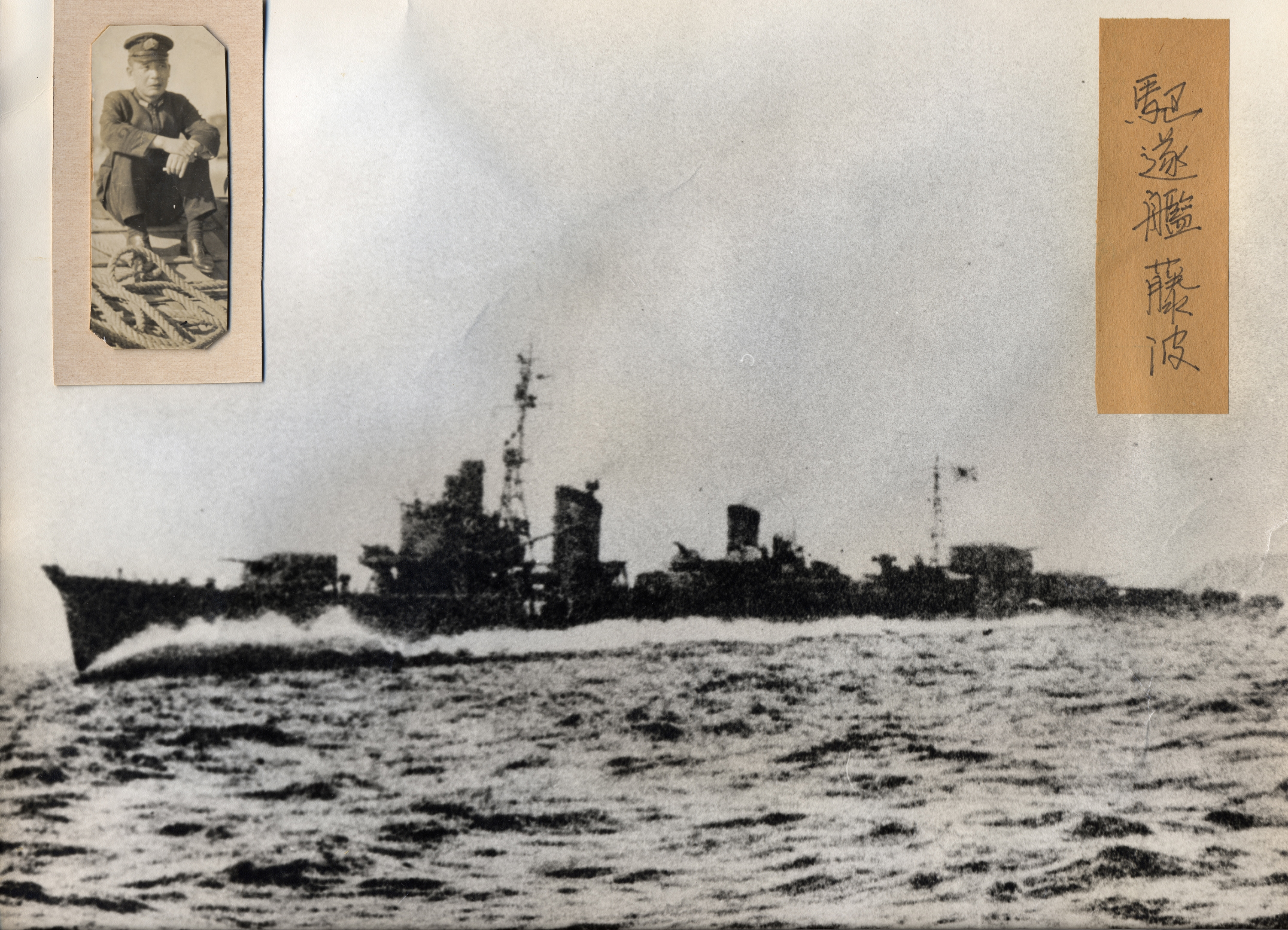
Fujinami

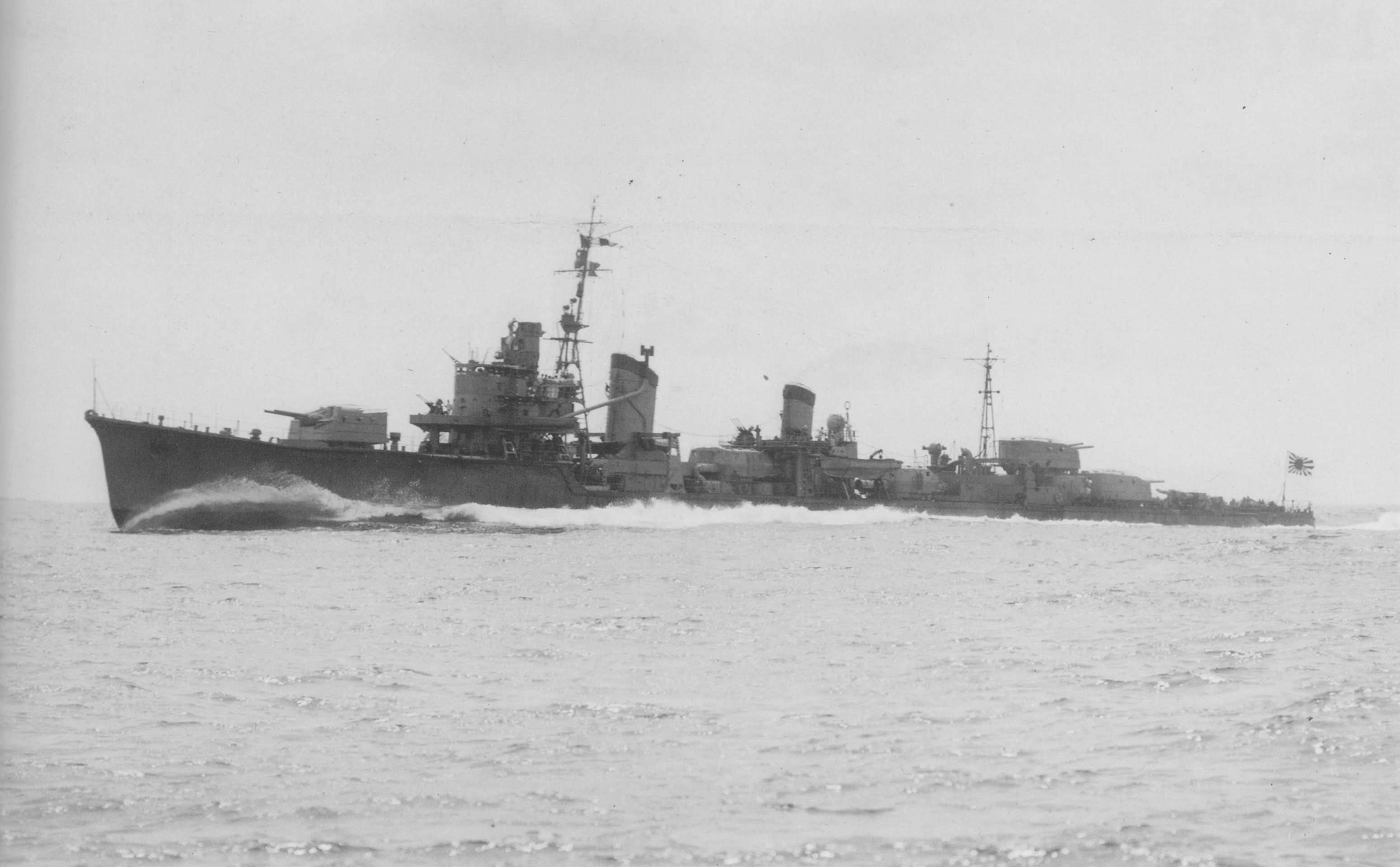
Hayanami

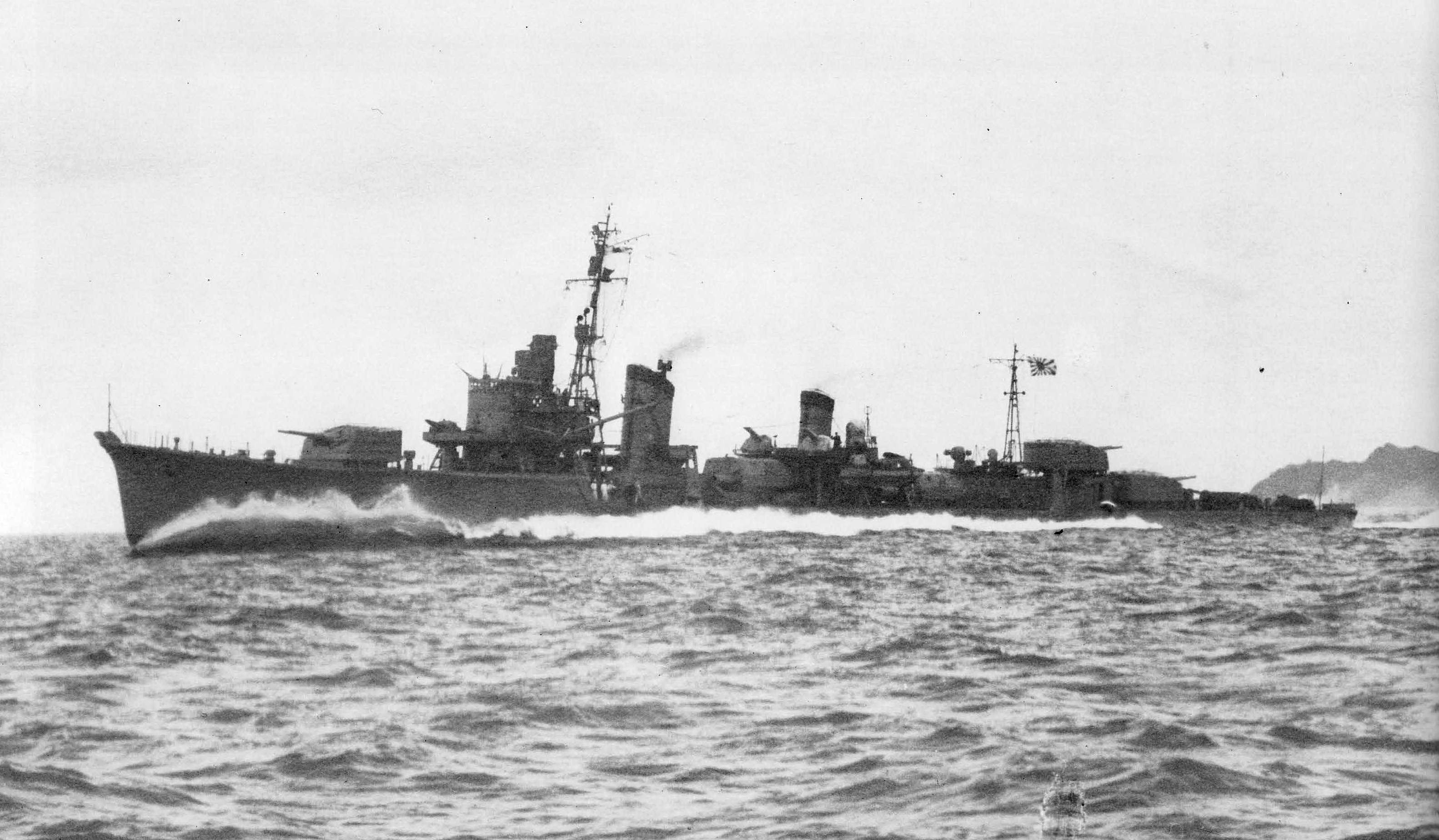
Hamanami

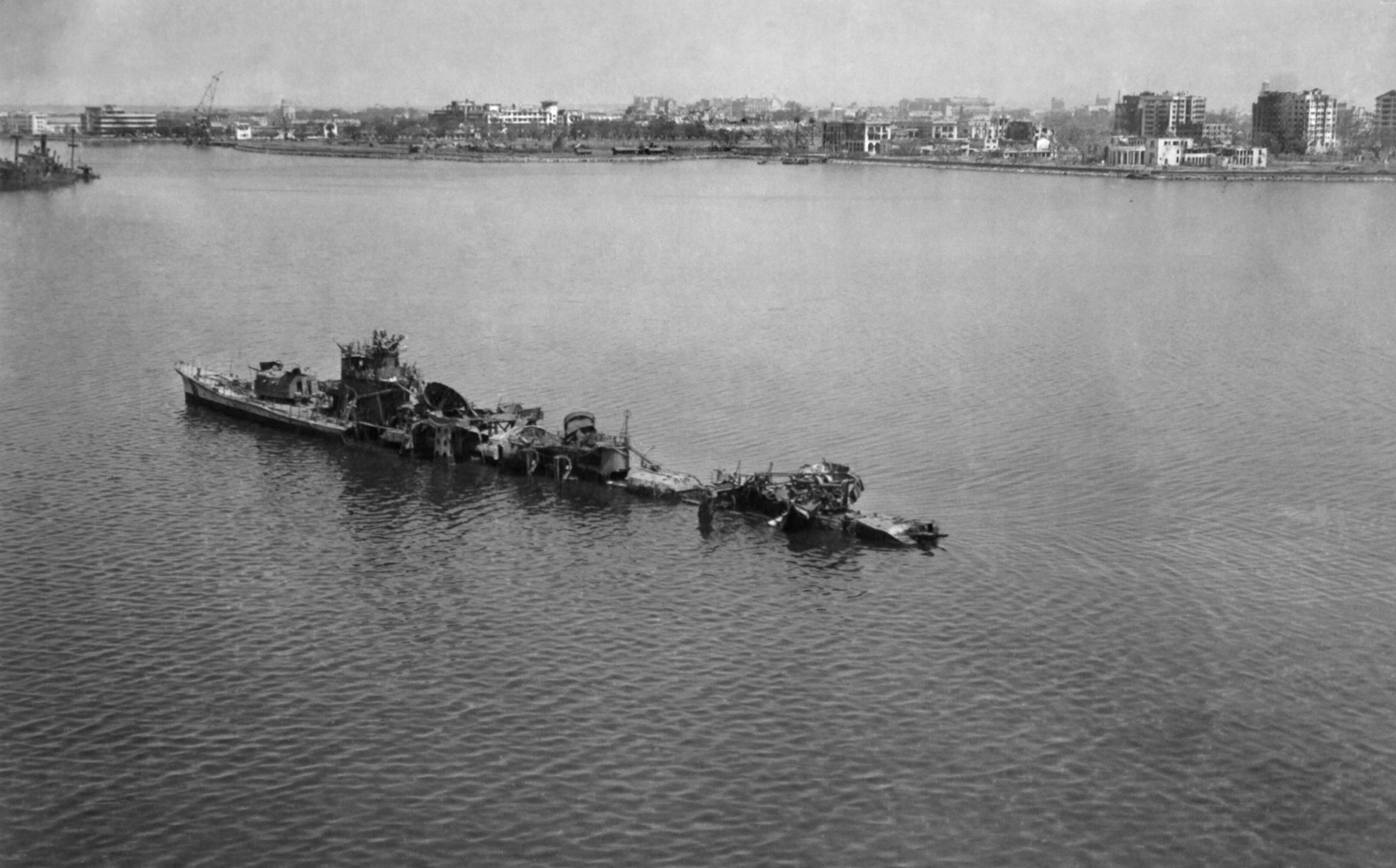
Okinami

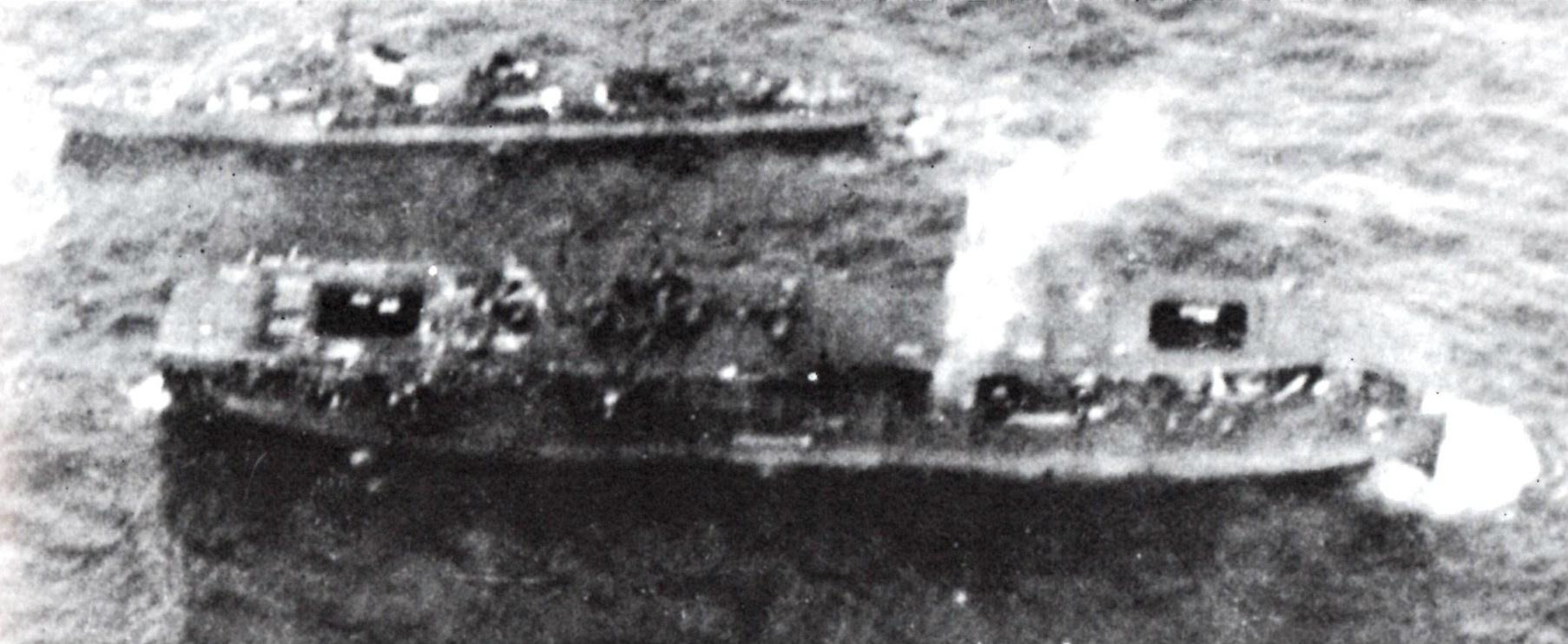
Kishinami

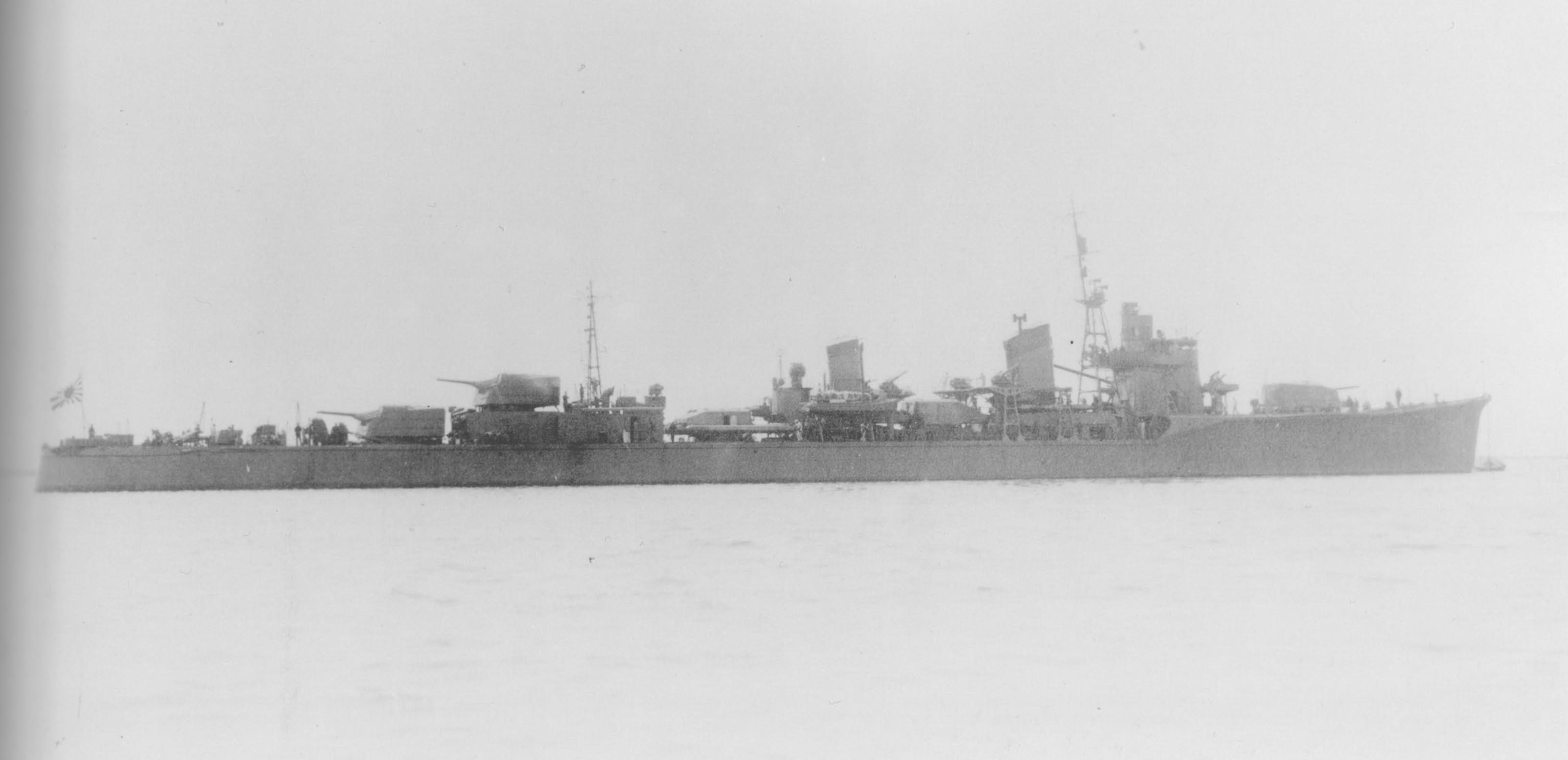
Asashimo

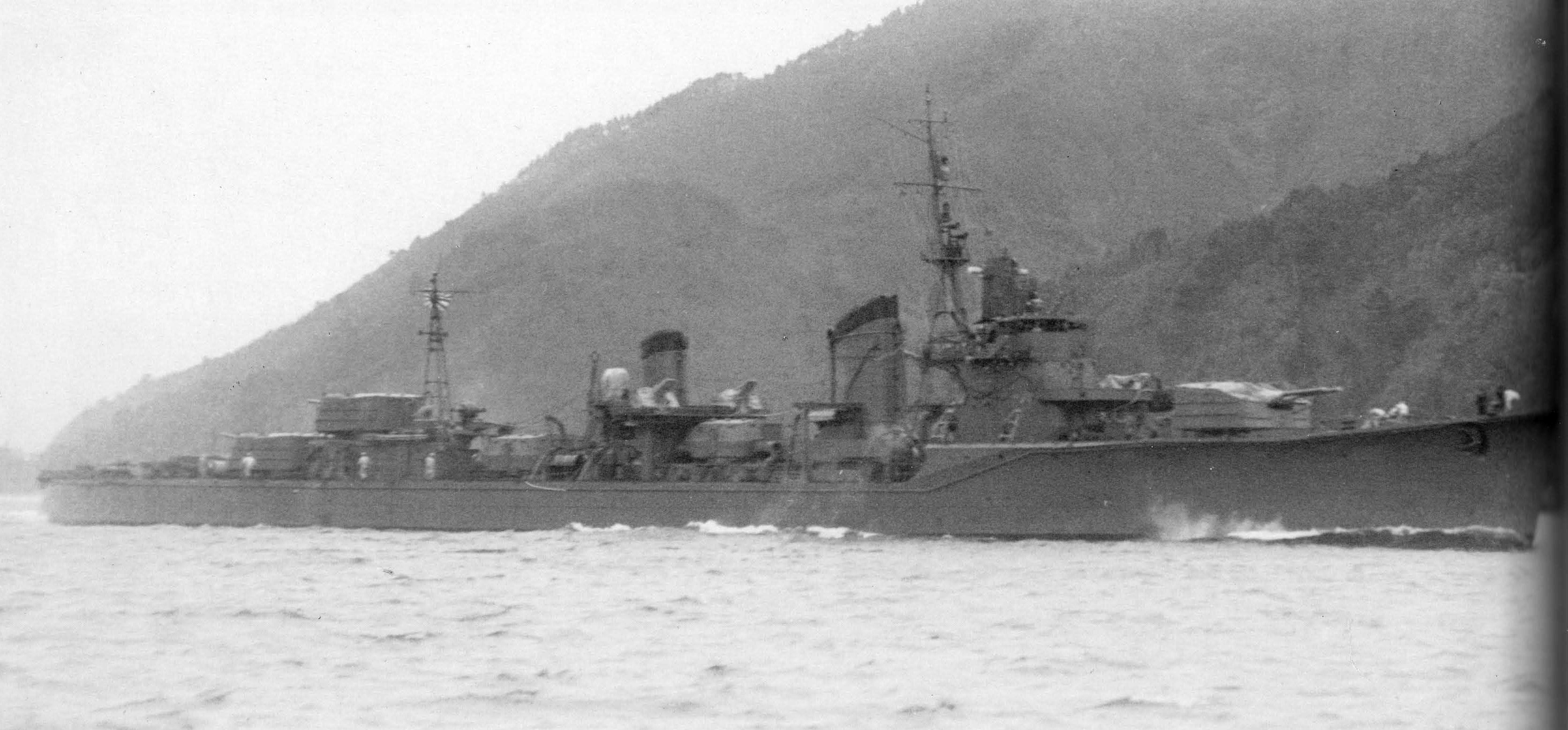
Hayashimo

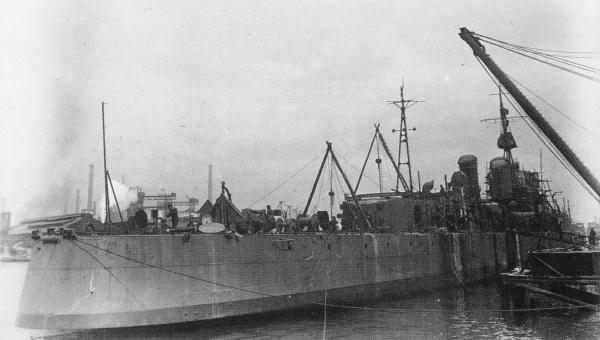
Akishimo

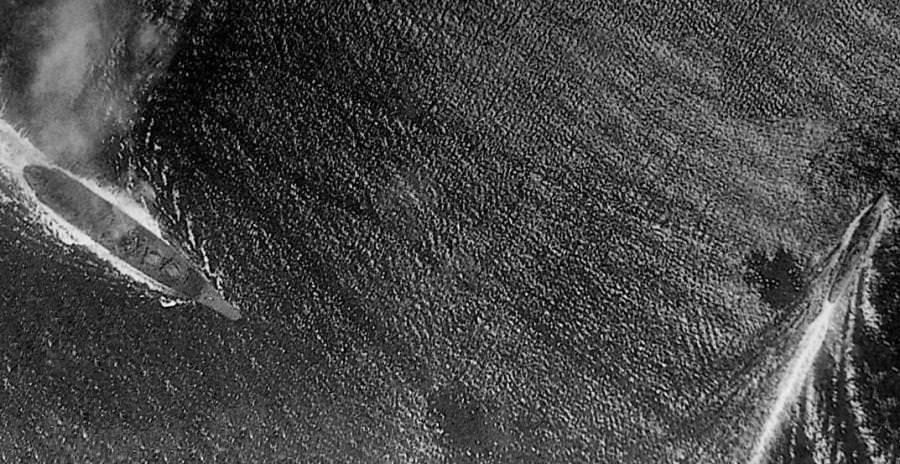
Kiyoshimo and Musashi
