= Japanese destroyer Fujinami =

Yūgumo-class destroyer

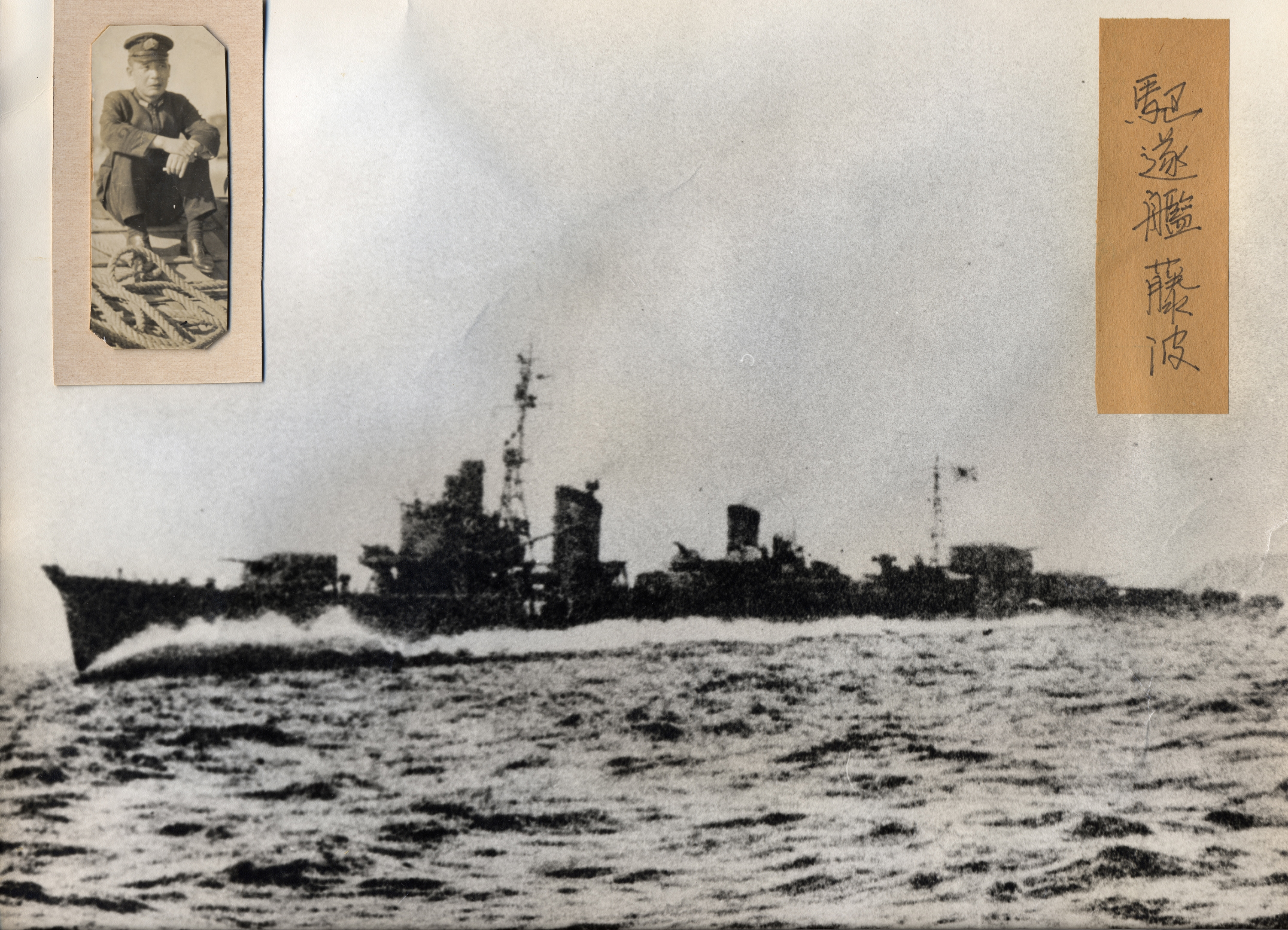
- Fujinami with a portrait of Captain Tatsuji Matsuzaki

History

Empire of Japan
- Name: Fujinami
- Builder: Fujinagata Shipyards, Osaka
- Laid down: 25 August 1942
- Launched: 20 April 1943
- Completed: 31 July 1943
- Stricken: 10 December 1944
- Fate: Sunk in action, 27 October 1944

General characteristics
- Class & type: Yūgumo-class destroyer
- Displacement: 2,520 long tons (2,560 t)
- Length: 119.15 m (390 ft 11 in)
- Beam: 10.8 m (35 ft 5 in)
- Draught: 3.75 m (12 ft 4 in)
- Speed: 35 knots (40 mph; 65 km/h)
- Complement: 228
- Armament: 6 × 127 mm (5.0 in)/50 caliber DP guns; up to 28 × Type 96 25 mm (0.98 in) AA guns; up to 4 × 13.2 mm (0.52 in) AA guns; 8 × 610 mm (24 in) torpedo tubes for Type 93 torpedoes; 36 depth charges

Fujinami (藤波) was a Yūgumo-class destroyer of the Imperial Japanese Navy. Her name means "Purple Wave" or "Waves of Wisterias".

== Service ==
She was damaged by a dud aerial torpedo during an air raid at Rabaul on 5 November 1943, with one dead and nine wounded. The ship participated in the Battle of Philippine Sea.

In the Battle of Leyte Gulf, Fujinami escorted the 1st Diversion Attack Force, commanded by Admiral Kurita Takeo. She sustained minor damage from the air attacks on 24–25 October due to near-misses and strafing.

In the Battle off Samar on 25 October Fujinami was detached to assist Chōkai, then she removed survivors and scuttled the cruiser with a torpedo. Some US survivors of the escort carrier Gambier Bay have stated that the commanding officer Cmdr. Tatsuji Matsuzaki restrained his men from firing on them as they floated by Fujinami and was allegedly seen to salute the American sailors.

On 27 October, while steaming to assist the destroyer Hayashimo, Fujinami was sunk by aircraft from the aircraft carrier USS Essex, 80 miles (130 km) north of Iloilo (12°0′N 122°30′E). She was lost with all hands, including the Chōkai survivors. The commanding officer was Cmdr. Tatsuji Matsuzaki from 31 July 1943 – 27 October 1944 (KIA).

== Bibliography ==
- Sturton, Ian (1980). "Japan". In Chesneau, Roger (ed.). Conway's All the World's Fighting Ships 1922–1946. Greenwich, UK: Conway Maritime Press. pp. 167–217. ISBN 0-85177-146-7.
- Whitley, M. J. (2000). Destroyers of World War Two: An International Encyclopedia. London: Cassell & Co. ISBN 1-85409-521-8.
