= Japanese destroyer Akishimo =

Destroyer of the Imperial Japanese Navy

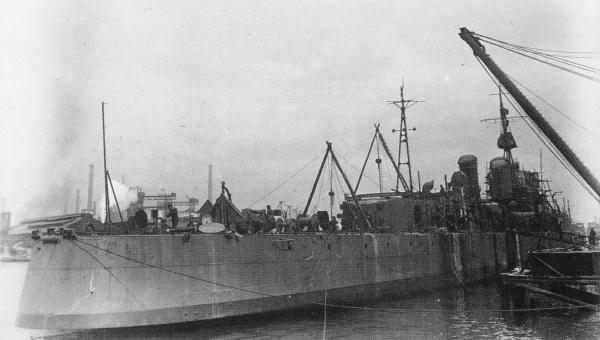
- Akishimo under construction at Fujinagata Shipyard, Osaka, February 1944.

History

Empire of Japan
- Name: Akishimo
- Builder: Fujinagata Shipyards, Osaka
- Laid down: 3 May 1943
- Launched: 5 December 1943
- Completed: 11 March 1944
- Stricken: 10 January 1945
- Fate: Sunk in action, 14 November 1944

General characteristics
- Class & type: Yūgumo-class destroyer
- Displacement: 2,520 long tons (2,560 t)
- Length: 119.15 m (390 ft 11 in)
- Beam: 10.8 m (35 ft 5 in)
- Draft: 3.75 m (12 ft 4 in)
- Speed: 35 kn (65 km/h; 40 mph)
- Complement: 228
- Armament: 6 × 127 mm (5.0 in)/50 cal dual-purpose guns, up to 28 × Type 96 25 mm (0.98 in) anti-aircraft cannons, up to 4 × 13.2 mm (0.52 in) AA machine guns, 8 × 610 mm (24 in) torpedo tubes, 36 depth charges

Akishimo (秋霜; "Autumn Frost") was a Yūgumo-class destroyer of the Imperial Japanese Navy.

== Design and description ==
The Yūgumo class was a repeat of the preceding Kagerō class with minor improvements that increased their anti-aircraft capabilities. Their crew numbered 228 officers and enlisted men. The ships measured 119.17 meters (391 ft 0 in) overall, with a beam of 10.8 meters (35 ft 5 in) and a draft of 3.76 meters (12 ft 4 in). They displaced 2,110 metric tons (2,080 long tons) at standard load and 2,560 metric tons (2,520 long tons) at deep load. The ships had two Kampon geared steam turbines, each driving one propeller shaft, using steam provided by three Kampon water-tube boilers. The turbines were rated at a total of 52,000 shaft horsepower (39,000 kW) for a designed speed of 35 knots (65 km/h; 40 mph).

The main armament of the Yūgumo class consisted of six Type 3 127-millimeter (5.0 in) guns in three twin-gun turrets, one superfiring pair aft and one turret forward of the superstructure. The guns were able to elevate up to 75° to increase their ability against aircraft, but their slow rate of fire, slow traversing speed, and the lack of any sort of high-angle fire-control system meant that they were virtually useless as anti-aircraft guns. They were built with four Type 96 25-millimeter (1.0 in) anti-aircraft guns in two twin-gun mounts, but more of these guns were added over the course of the war. The ships were also armed with eight 610-millimeter (24.0 in) torpedo tubes in a two quadruple traversing mounts; one reload was carried for each tube. Their anti-submarine weapons comprised two depth charge throwers for which 36 depth charges were carried.

== Construction and career ==
She was at the Battle of Leyte Gulf of 23–26 October 1944, assigned to the 1st Diversion Attack Force. On 23 October, she rescued 769 survivors of the cruiser Maya. On 24 October, she assisted the torpedoed cruiser Myōkō. The next day she suffered minor damage in a collision with the destroyer Shimakaze. On 26 October she rescued 328 survivors from the cruiser Noshiro.

On 10 November 1944, Akishimo was escorting troop convoy TA No. 4 from Manila to Ormoc, Philippines. She suffered heavy damage in an air attack by U.S. Army B-25 Mitchells during the withdrawal; the ship took a direct bomb hit and lost her bow with 20 killed and 35 injured. The destroyer returned to Manila at 16 kn (30 km/h; 18 mph), then to Cavite Navy Yard on 11 November for repairs.

On 13 November, a U.S. air raid on Manila struck Akishimo, then alongside the destroyer Akebono at Cavite pier (14°35′N 120°55′E). Direct bomb hits set both ships ablaze. The following day a large explosion on Akishimo further damaged both ships; Akishimo rolled over onto her starboard side. There were 170 survivors, 15 crewmen killed and 25 wounded.

== Sources ==
- Campbell, John (1985). Naval Weapons of World War II. Annapolis, Maryland: Naval Institute Press. ISBN 0-87021-459-4.
- Jentschura, Hansgeorg; Jung, Dieter & Mickel, Peter (1977). Warships of the Imperial Japanese Navy, 1869–1945. Annapolis, Maryland: United States Naval Institute. ISBN 0-87021-893-X.
- Sturton, Ian (1980). "Japan". In Chesneau, Roger (ed.). Conway's All the World's Fighting Ships 1922–1946. Greenwich, UK: Conway Maritime Press. pp. 167–217. ISBN 0-85177-146-7.
- Whitley, M. J. (2000). Destroyers of World War Two: An International Encyclopedia. London: Cassell & Co. ISBN 1-85409-521-8.
