= 8th Fleet (Imperial Japanese Navy) =

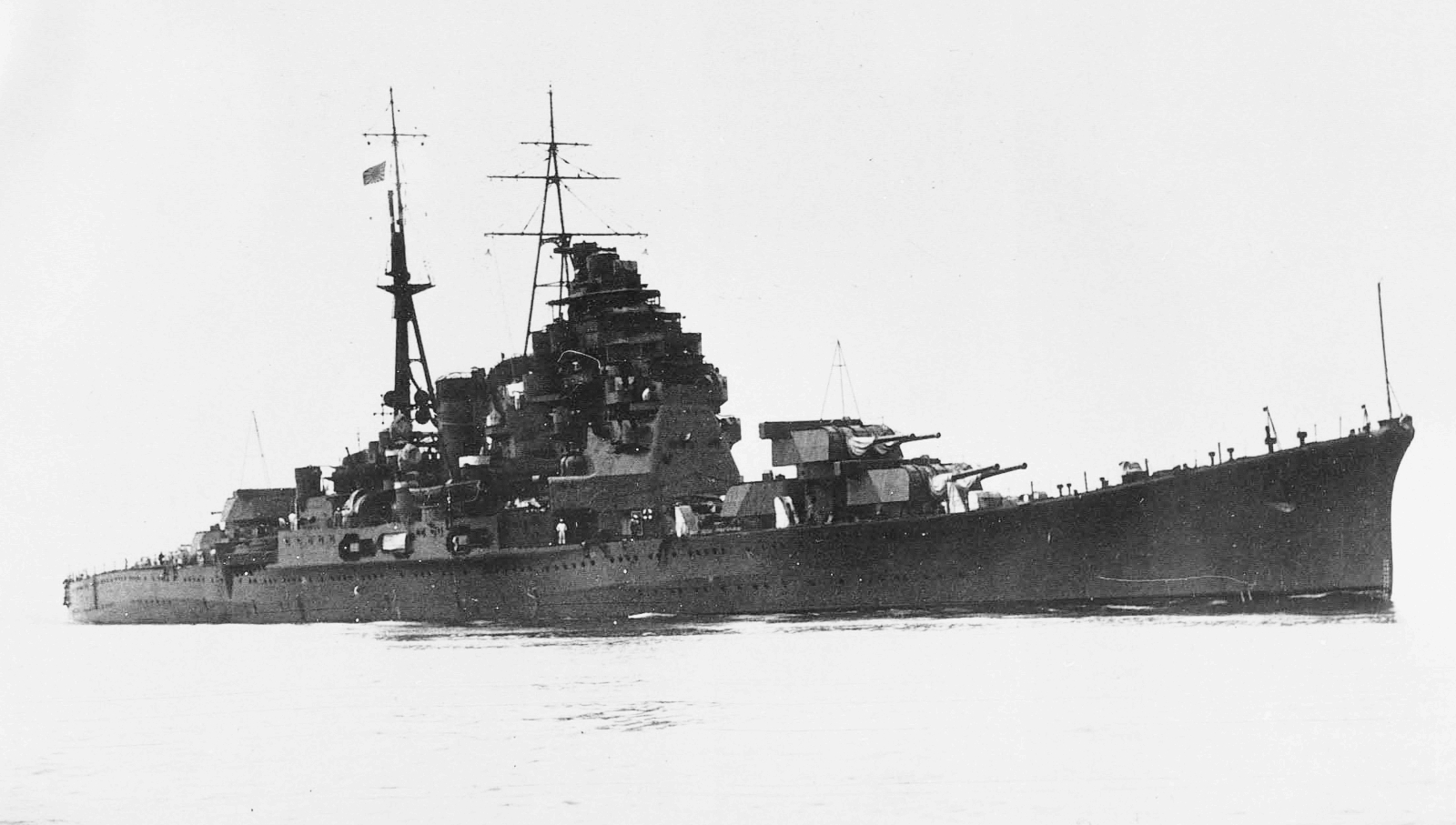
- Japanese heavy cruiser Chōkai, flagship of the 8th Fleet in 1942.
- Active: 14 July 1942
- Country: Empire of Japan
- Branch: (Empire of Japan) Imperial Japanese Navy
- Type: Naval fleet
- Garrison/HQ: Rabaul
- Engagements: Solomon Islands Campaign; New Guinea Campaign; Battle of Savo Island; Battle of Cape Esperance; Naval Battle of Guadalcanal; Battle of Tassafaronga; Operation KE; Battle of the Bismarck Sea

Commanders
- Notable commanders: Gunichi Mikawa

The 8th Fleet (第八艦隊, Dai-hachi Kantai) was a fleet of the Imperial Japanese Navy (IJN) established during World War II.

== History ==
The 8th Fleet was established on 14 July 1942 and was given the operational title of Outer South Seas Force, which reflected its mission of guarding conquests in the South Pacific. In this respect, it essentially replaced the 4th Fleet, which was then given the operational title of Inner South Seas Force, and was primarily tasked with defending the Mandates. Vice Admiral Gunichi Mikawa was appointed as the first commander of the 8th Fleet.

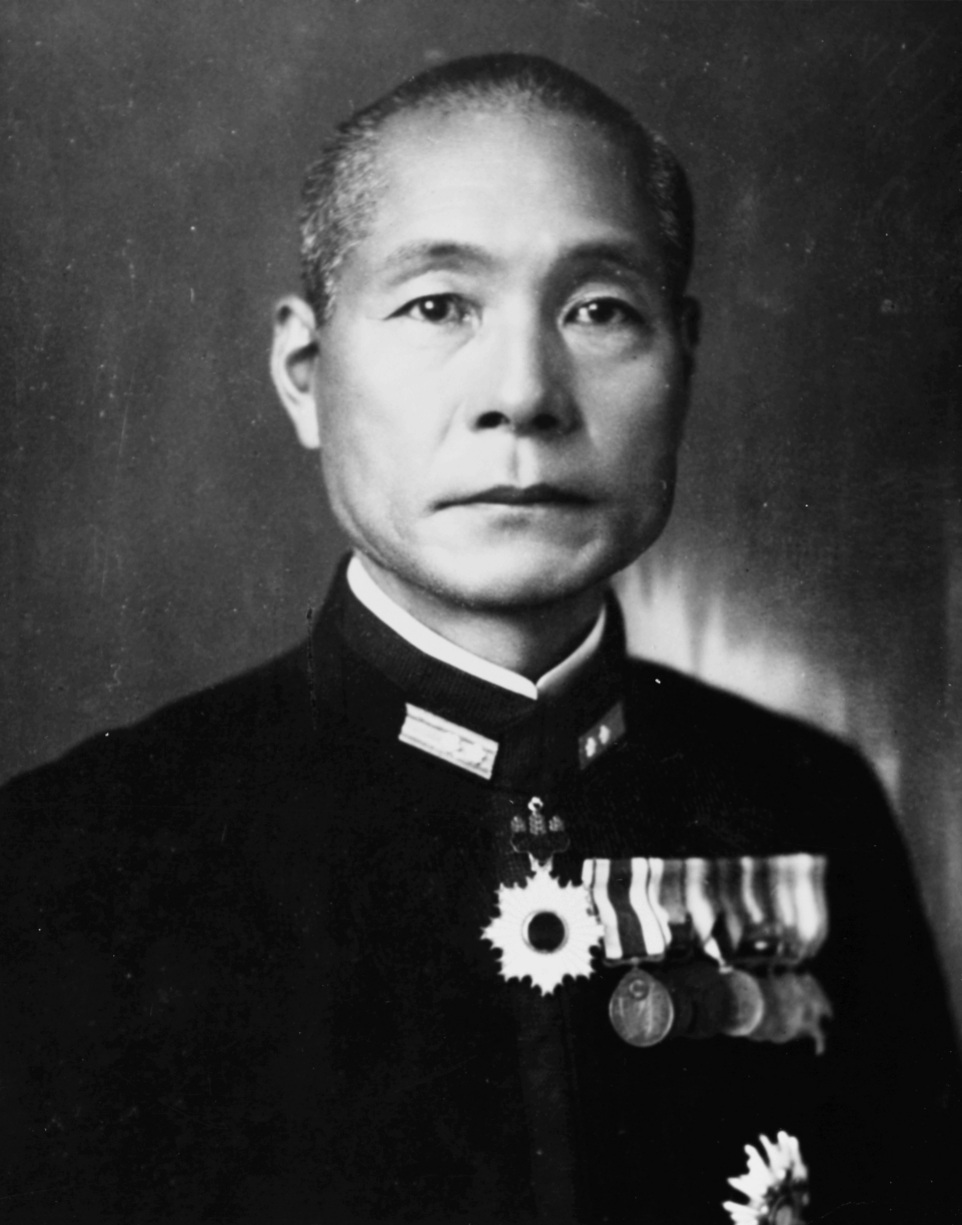
Vice Admiral Gunichi Mikawa was the first commander of the 8th Fleet and led it throughout the Guadalcanal Campaign.

Initially, the 8th Fleet included the Takao-class heavy cruiser Chōkai as its flagship, Cruiser Division 6 (CruDiv6) under Rear Admiral Aritomo Gotō with the entire Furutaka and Aoba classes of four older and somewhat smaller heavy cruisers (Aoba, Kinugasa, Kako and Furutaka), Cruiser Division 18 (CruDiv18) under Rear Admiral Mitsuharu Matsuyama with three old light cruisers (Tenryū, Tatsuta and Yūbari), eight old destroyers, and Submarine Squadron 7 (SubDiv7) with five submarines. In addition, the minelayer Tsugaru, the seaplane tender Kiyokawa Maru, and the 2nd Air Group were initially assigned to the 8th Fleet, where the latter was soon transferred to the 25th Air Flotilla of 11th Air Fleet in August 1942.

On 25 July, Vice Admiral Mikawa led the fleet to Truk in Caroline Islands. From there he then moved to Rabaul on New Britain and arrived on 30 July, where he established his headquarters. He detached CruDiv6 under Rear Admiral Gotō to Kavieng on New Ireland, in order to move them out of the range of Allied aircraft. When the news of Allied landings on Guadalcanal and Tulagi reached the 8th Fleet headquarters on August 7, Mikawa promptly decided to make a night-time counter-attack with his available surface naval forces, despite the presence of American carriers. He ordered CruDiv6 to leave Kavieng to meet his flagship Chōkai. Initially, Mikawa did not want to take the two available old light cruisers from CruDiv18 (Tenryū and Yūbari), since he deemed them as a liability due to their age and lack of crew training. Nevertheless, a stubborn staff officer of CruDiv18 managed to convince Mikawa to take them along. Only one destroyer (Yūnagi) was available at the time to escort the striking force. After assembling the warships, Mikawa sailed toward Guadalcanal. Furthermore, He sent four submarines of SubDiv7 ahead of his surface striking force.

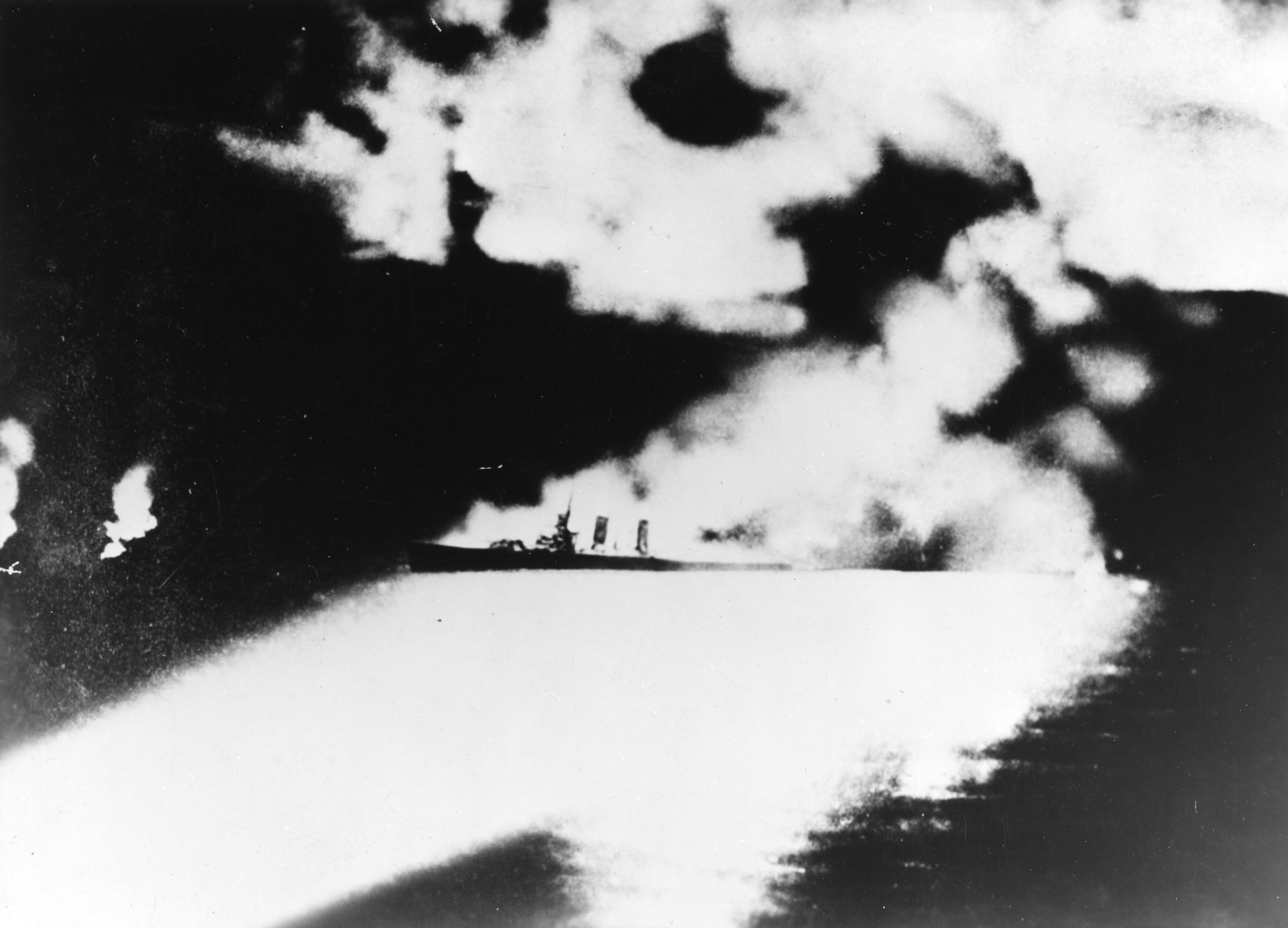
8th Fleet warships led by Vice Admiral Mikawa dealt a major defeat to Allied naval forces at the Battle of Savo Island on 9 August 1942 by sinking four heavy cruisers.

In the ensuing Battle of Savo Island in the early morning of 9 August, Admiral Mikawa's 8th Fleet defeated a numerically superior Allied Task Force 62.2, composed primarily of United States Navy vessels, but with a substantial Royal Australian Navy component, all under the command of British Rear Admiral Victor Crutchley. The striking force of the 8th Fleet sank four Allied heavy cruisers and additionally damaged one more heavy cruiser and two destroyers, in exchange for a relativity minor damage to two heavy cruisers and one destroyer. Nevertheless, they failed to follow through and destroy the lightly protected American transports that were in the process of landing critical supplies for the Allied troops on the ground. While CruDiv6 was returning to Kavieng on 10 August, heavy cruiser Kako was torpedoed and sunk by US submarine S-44.

During the Guadalcanal Campaign, the 8th Fleet was responsible for bringing reinforcements and supplies to the island. For this purpose Reinforcement Unit was formed, which was centered around Destroyer Squadron 2 led by Rear Admiral Raizō Tanaka. On 31 August, Tanaka was temporarily replaced in this role by Rear Admiral Shintarō Hashimoto and his Destroyer Squadron 3. On 28 August 1942, the 8th Fleet also created the R-Area Air Force, which exclusively operated seaplanes in order to compensate for the lack of land bases in the Solomon Islands area. The unit's primary mission was to protect resupply convoys headed for Guadalcanal and to conduct aerial reconnaissance.

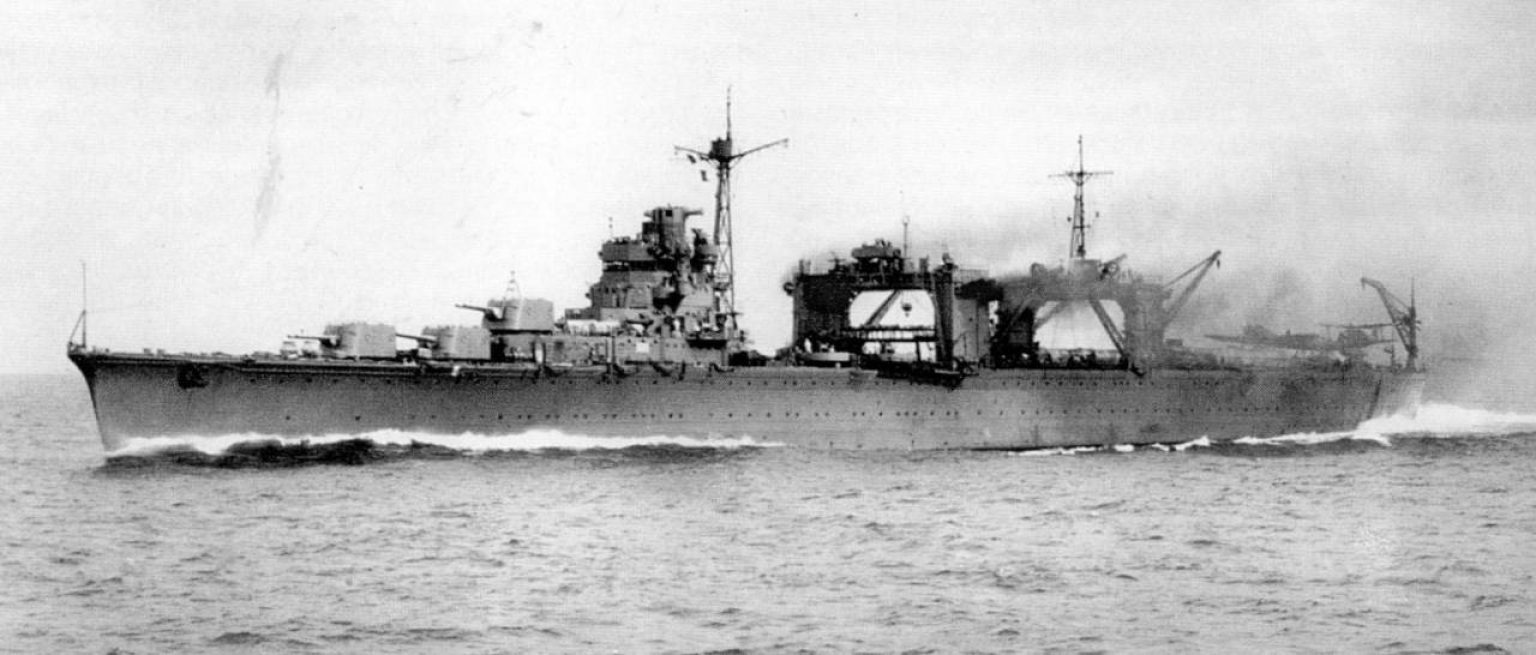
Seaplane tender Nisshin was used by the 8th Fleet's Reinforcement Unit as a high-speed transport to resupply Guadalcanal in October 1942.

Since regular resupply runs by destroyers only could not deliver heavy equipment (such as artillery) to the Imperial Japanese Army (IJA) on Guadalcanal, the 8th Fleet's Reinforcement Unit started using seaplane tenders Chitose and Nisshin as high-speed transports. To cover the unloading of supplies by the convoy on 11 October, the 8th Fleet assigned CruDiv6 with heavy cruisers Aoba, Kinugasa and Furutaka and two destroyers under Rear Admiral Gotō to bombard the Allied position on Guadalcanal. On the night of 11/12 October they were ambushed by two heavy cruisers, two light cruisers and five destroyers under Rear Admiral Norman Scott, which resulted in the Battle of Cape Esperance. The battle accounted for the loss of Furutaka and one Japanese destroyer, in exchange for the loss of one US destroyer. Furthermore, Rear Admiral Gotō was also mortally wounded in the battle. Nevertheless, the convoy managed to successfully unload the supplies and equipment on Guadalcanal. Two of its destroyers, while retreating from Guadalcanal, were sunk by air attacks the following day. Another major resupply run was conducted on the night of 14/15 October by Nisshin, while Vice Admiral Mikawa with Chōkai and Kinugasa shelled Allied position on Guadalcanal to cover the cargo unloading process.

The 8th Fleet was also involved in the Naval Battle of Guadalcanal, where Vice Admiral Mikawa led a naval force that consisted of heavy cruisers Chōkai, Kinugasa, Maya, Suzuya, light cruisers Isuzu and Tenryū, and four destroyers. In the early morning of November 14, Maya and Suzuya were detached under Rear Admiral Shōji Nishimura to conduct a bombardment of the Allied position on Guadalcanal, before rendezvousing with Mikawa and the rest of the force after sunrise south of New Georgia. After that, they were repeatedly attacked by Allied aircraft throughout the morning, which sank Kinugasa and damaged Chōkai, Maya and Isuzu.

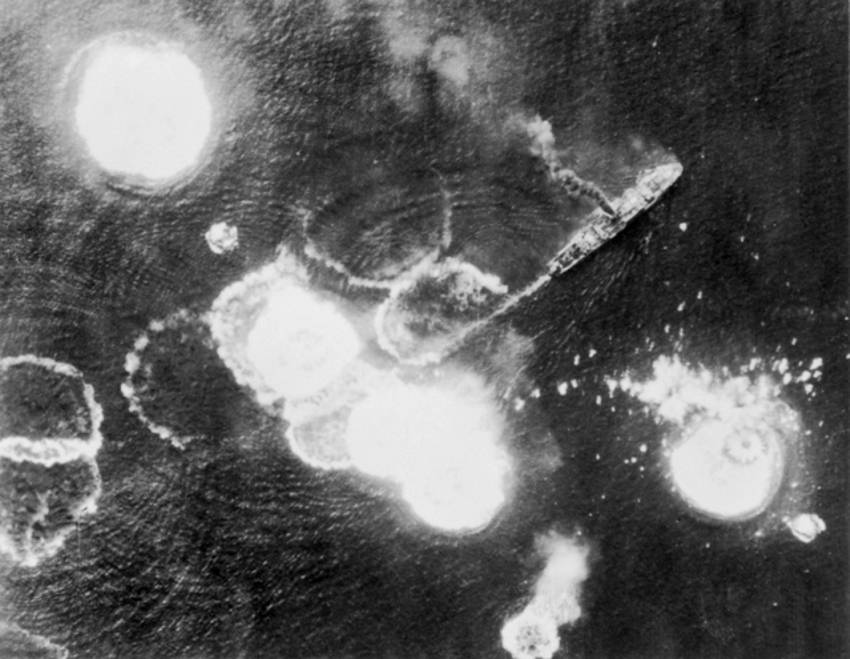
The 8th Fleet suffered a major blow from Allied air power at the Battle of the Bismarck Sea in March 1943.

On 24 December 1942 the 8th Fleet came under the operational authority of the Southeast Area Fleet. The 8th Fleet subsequently played a major role in Operation KE, the successful withdrawal of army forces from Guadalcanal during the first week of February 1943. Between 2–4 March eight destroyers from 8th Fleet under Rear Admiral Masatomi Kimura escorted a major reinforcement convoy from Rabaul to Lae on New Guinea. In the ensuing Battle of the Bismarck Sea the Japanese suffered a major defeat when Allied aircraft sank four destroyers and all eight transports. Shortly after this debacle, Vice Admiral Mikawa was relieved of the 8th Fleet command and replaced by Vice Admiral Tomoshige Samejima.

Later in the war, the 8th Fleet headquarters staff was isolated on Bougainville Island with remnants of Imperial Japanese Army forces.

== Commanders of the 8th Fleet ==
Commander in chief

	Rank	Name	Date
1	Vice Admiral	Gunichi Mikawa	14 Jul 1942 – 1 Apr 1943
2	Vice Admiral	Baron Tomoshige Samejima	1 Apr 1943 – 3 Sep 1945

Chief of staff

	Rank	Name	Date
1	Vice Admiral	Shinzo Onishi	14 Jul 1942 – 1 Apr 1943
2	Rear Admiral	Teijiro Yamazumi	1 Apr 1943 – 3 Sep 1945
