= Japanese cruiser Aoba =

Aoba-class cruiser

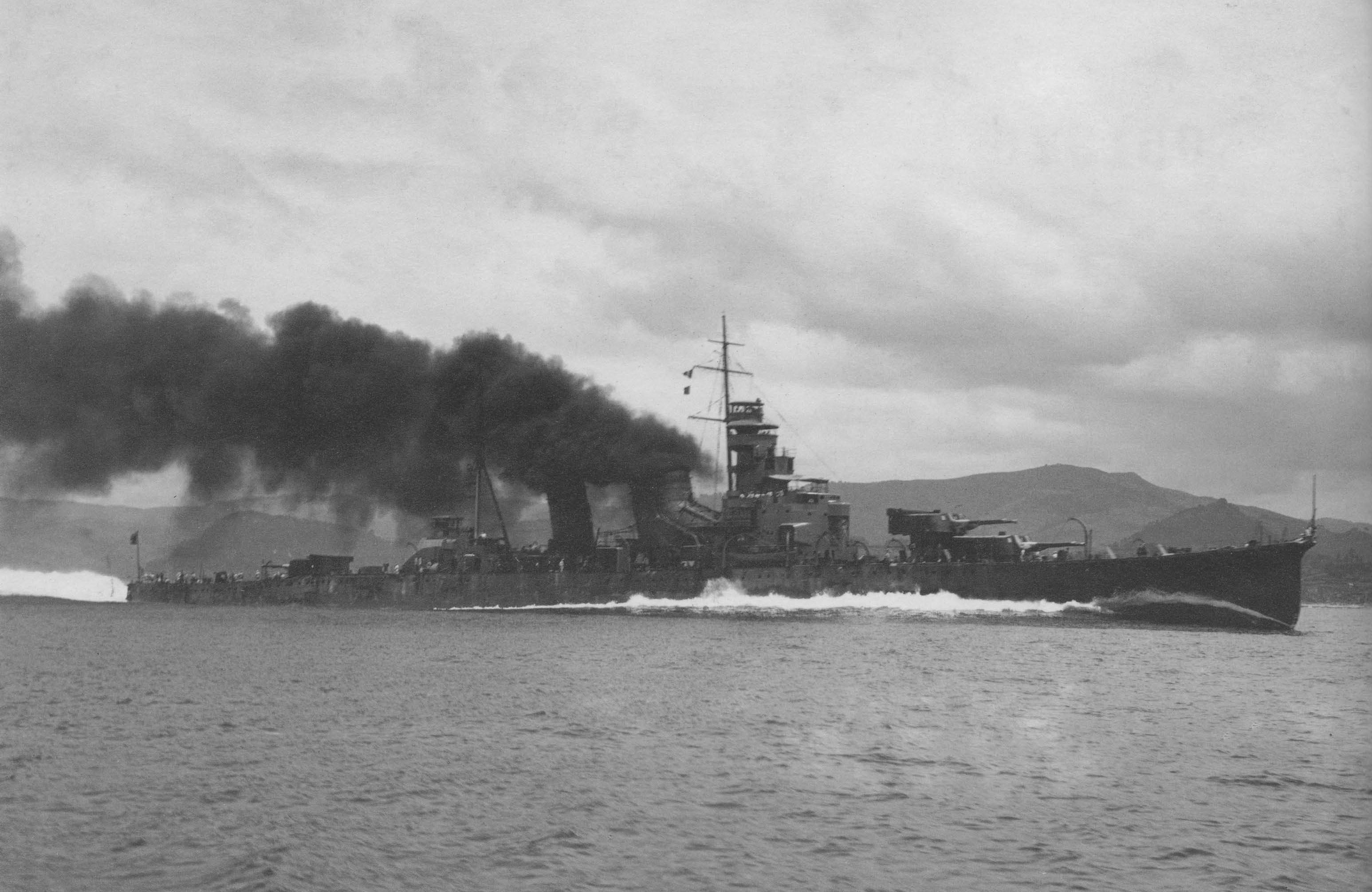
- Japanese heavy cruiser Aoba

History

Empire of Japan
- Name: Aoba
- Namesake: Mount Aoba
- Ordered: 1923 Fiscal Year
- Builder: Mitsubishi
- Laid down: 23 January 1924
- Launched: 25 September 1926
- Commissioned: 20 September 1927
- Out of service: 1945
- Stricken: 20 November 1945
- Fate: Sunk 24 July 1945 by US aircraft, raised and scrapped in 1946–47

General characteristics
- Class & type: Aoba-class cruiser
- Displacement: 8,300 tons (standard); 9,000 (final)
- Length: 185.17 m (607 ft 6 in)
- Beam: 15.83 m (51 ft 11 in) (initial); 17.56 m (57 ft 7 in) (final)
- Draught: 5.71 m (18 ft 9 in) (initial); 5.66 m (18 ft 7 in) (final)
- Propulsion: 4-shaft Brown Curtis geared turbines; 12 Kampon boilers; 102,000 shp (76,000 kW)
- Speed: 33.43–36 kn (61.91–66.67 km/h)
- Range: 7,000 nmi (13,000 km) at 14 kn (26 km/h) (initial); 8,223 nmi (15,229 km) at 14 knots (final)
- Complement: 643 (initial) – 657 (final)
- Armament: (initial); 6 × 20 cm (7.9 in)/50-cal Mark I guns (3×2), 4 × 12 cm (4.7 in)/45 (4x1), 12 × 610 mm (24 in) torpedo tubes (6x2); (final); 6 × 8 in (203 mm)/50-cal Mark II guns (3×2), 4 × 120 mm (4.7 in)/45-cal (4x1), 8 × 610 mm (24 in) torpedo tubes (2x4); 50 × Type 96 25 mm (0.98 in) AA guns
- Armor: 76 mm (belt); 36 mm (deck)
- Aircraft carried: 1 × floatplane (initial); 2 × floatplane, 1 catapult (final)

Aoba (Japanese: 青葉; named after Mount Aoba) was the lead ship in the two-vessel Aoba class of heavy cruisers in the Imperial Japanese Navy. Launched in 1926 and heavily modernized in 1938–40, Aoba initially served as a patrol craft, largely along the China coast, and saw extensive service during World War II. Repeatedly heavily damaged and repaired, she was finally crippled by bombing and settled on the bottom of shallow Kure harbor in April 1945; two raids in late July reduced her to an unsalvageable hulk. During the attack on 24 July 1945, future Vice Admiral Dick H. Guinn dropped the 2,000 lb (910 kg) bomb which contributed to her sinking. She was formally removed from the Navy List on 20 November 1945, and her wreck scrapped in 1946–47.

== Background and design ==
Following the Japanese ship-naming conventions, the ship was named after Mount Aoba, a volcano located behind Maizuru, Kyoto.

Aoba and her sister ship Kinugasa were originally planned as the third and fourth vessels in the Furutaka class of heavy cruisers. However, design issues with the Furutaka class resulted in modifications to include double turrets and an aircraft catapult. These modifications added yet more weight to an already top-heavy design, causing stability problems. Nevertheless, Aoba played an important role in World War II.

She displaced 8,300 tons (standard, 9,000 final), was 185.17 metres (607 ft 6 in) long, and carried a main battery of six 20 cm/50 3rd Year Type naval guns in three twin turrets, two forward and one aft.

== Service career ==
=== Early career ===
Aoba was completed at Mitsubishi shipyards at Nagasaki on 20 September 1927 and was assigned to CruDiv5 until 1933 and thereafter to CruDiv6 and CruDiv7, serving as flagship during much of her career. She was frequently dispatched to patrol the China coast in the late 1920s and the 1930s.

Aoba was extensively modernized at Sasebo Navy Yard from 1938 to 1940, receiving new torpedo tubes, enhanced anti-aircraft guns, improved fire controls and better aircraft facilities. Her bridge was rebuilt and bulges added to her hull in an attempt to compensate for the additional weight and improve stability. After re-commissioning in October 1940, Aoba returned to CruDiv6.

=== Early stages of the Pacific War ===
In 1941, Aoba was flagship of Rear Admiral Aritomo Goto as part of the First Fleet under overall command of Vice Admiral Takasu Shiro. CruDiv 6 consisted of Aoba, Kinugasa, Furutaka and Kako. At the time of the attack on Pearl Harbor, CruDiv6 was engaged in the invasion of Guam, following which she participated in the second invasion of Wake Island.

=== Battle of Coral Sea ===
At the Battle of the Coral Sea, CruDiv 6 departed Shortland and effected a rendezvous at sea with light aircraft carrier Shōhō. At 1100 on 7 May 1942 north of Taguli Island, Shōhō was attacked and sunk by 93 SBD Dauntless dive bombers and TBD Devastator torpedo bombers from the aircraft carriers USS Yorktown and Lexington.

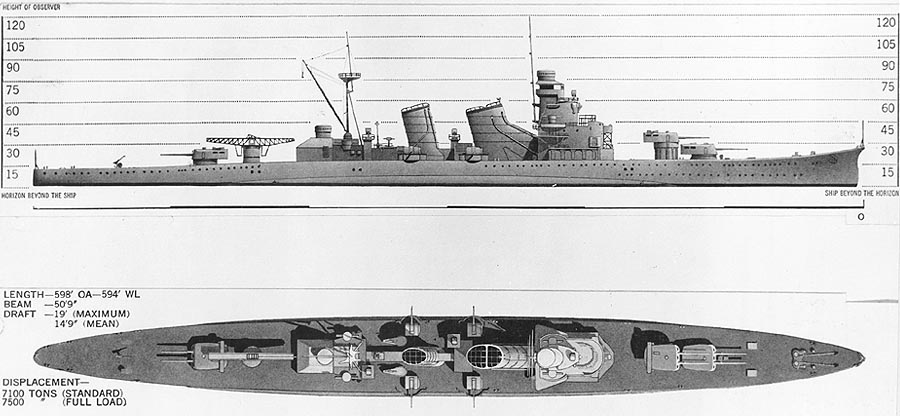
World War II recognition drawings of Aoba

The following day, 8 May 1942, 46 SBDs, 21 TBDs and 15 Grumman F4F Wildcats from Yorktown and Lexington damaged the aircraft carrier Shōkaku severely above the waterline and forced her retirement. Furutaka and Kinugasa, undamaged in the battle, escorted Shōkaku back to Truk. Kako and Aoba continued to cover the withdrawing Port Moresby invasion convoy.

After refueling at Shortland on 9 May, Aoba returned to Kure Naval Arsenal on 22 May 1942 for repairs, and returned to Truk on 23 June 1942, and from Truk to Rekata Bay, Santa Isabel Island, where she was assigned patrols through July.

In a major reorganization of the Japanese navy on 14 July 1942, Aoba was assigned to the newly created Eighth Fleet under Vice Admiral Mikawa Gunichi and was assigned to patrols around the Solomon Islands, New Britain, and New Ireland.

=== The Battle of Savo Island ===
On 7 August 1942, an Aichi E13A1 "Jake" from Aoba spotted "one battleship, one auxiliary carrier, four cruisers, seven destroyers, and fifteen transports" off Lunga Point near Tulagi.

In the Battle of Savo Island on August 9, 1942, CruDiv 6, Chōkai, light cruisers Tenryū and Yūbari and destroyer Yūnagi engaged the Allied force in a night gun and torpedo action. At about 2300, Chōkai, Furutaka, and Kako, all launched their reconnaissance floatplanes. The circling floatplanes dropped flares illuminating the targets and all the Japanese ships opened fire. The cruisers USS Astoria, Quincy, Vincennes and HMAS Canberra were sunk. The cruiser USS Chicago was damaged as were the destroyers Ralph Talbot and Patterson. On the Japanese side, Chōkai was hit three times, Kinugasa twice, and Aoba once; Furutaka was not damaged. As CruDiv6 retired towards Kavieng, Kako was sunk by the submarine USS S-44, but Aoba escaped without further damage. Through the rest of August and September, Aoba and CruDiv6 provided cover to the "Tokyo Express" reinforcement convoys to Guadalcanal.

=== Battle of Cape Esperance ===
At the Battle of Cape Esperance on 11 October 1942, CruDiv 6's cruisers (Aoba, Furutaka, and Kinugasa), and destroyers (Fubuki and Hatsuyuki) departed Shortland to provide cover for a troop reinforcement convoy by shelling Henderson Field on Guadalcanal. Two American OS2U Kingfisher reconnaissance aircraft spotted the fleet coming down the "Slot" at 30 knots (56 km/h).

So alerted, the radar-equipped American cruisers USS San Francisco, Boise, Salt Lake City, and Helena and five destroyers steamed around the end of Guadalcanal to block the entrance to Savo Sound.

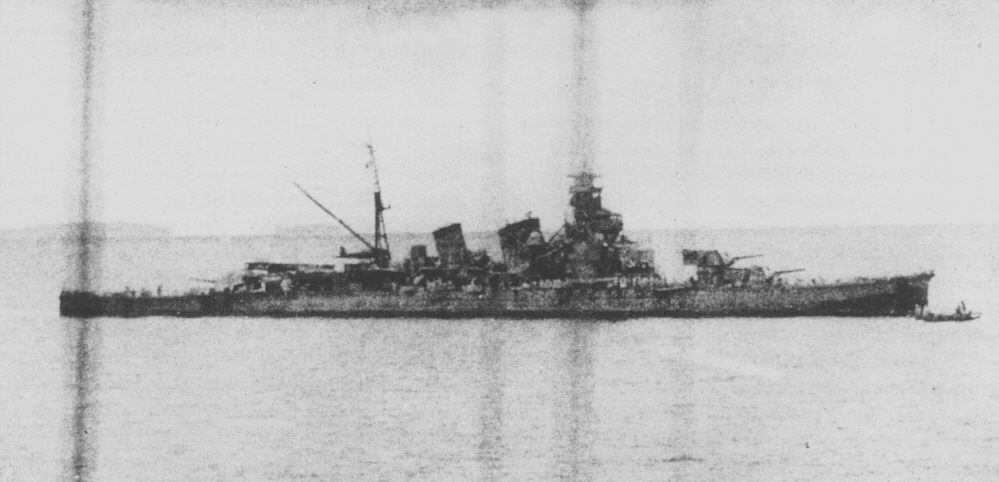
Aoba, photographed off Buin, Bougainville after the Battle of Cape Esperance

At 2235, Helena's radar spotted the Japanese fleet, and the Americans successfully crossed the Japanese "T". Both fleets opened fire, but Admiral Goto, thinking that he was under friendly-fire, ordered a 180-degree turn that exposed each of his ships to the American broadsides. Furutaka was sunk. Aoba was hit by up to forty 6-inch (152 mm) and 8-inch (203 mm) shells. The bridge was wrecked, the No. 2 turret was knocked out and the No. 3 turret destroyed. Other hits put four of the Aoba’s boilers off line. Admiral Goto was mortally wounded and 80 other crewmen were killed. After temporary repairs at Shortland, Aoba limped back to Truk on 15 October, where Admiral Isoroku Yamamoto personally inspected the damage and ordered the ship back to Japan.

=== Later service ===
Aoba returned to Kure on 22 October. During repairs, the wrecked No. 3 turret was covered over with steel plates, and a Type 96 triple-mount 25-mm AA gun installed in its place. Aoba was sent back to Truk on 24 February 1943.

On 3 April, while moored at Kavieng, New Ireland, Aoba was bombed by Boeing B-17 Flying Fortresses of the Fifth Air Force's 43rd Bombardment Group. A direct hit on Aoba caused two Type 93 Long Lance torpedoes to explode and set the ship on fire while the B-17s strafed the decks with machine guns. Aoba had to be beached to avoid sinking.

After being towed back to Truk, and again to Kure on 1 August, Aoba was again repaired and re-fitted. The 200 mm (8 in) gun was restored to the No. 3 turret and a Type 21 air-search radar and two Type 96 twin-mount 25-mm AA guns were installed. However, irreparable engine damage reduced Aoba's maximum speed to 25 knots (46 km/h).

Aoba was reassigned to the First Southern Expeditionary Fleet and arrived at Singapore on 24 December 1943. The ship remained based out of Singapore to the end of February 1944, escorting supply convoys to Burma, the Andaman Islands and along the Malaya coast. On 25 February, the vessel was assigned to CruDiv16, with which Aoba participated in the Indian Ocean raid during March 1944. Through April, May and June, Aoba resumed its escort duties through the Dutch East Indies and New Guinea. During a refit at Singapore in July, Aoba gained four triple-mount and 15 single-mount Type 96 25-mm AA guns and a Type 22 surface-search radar.

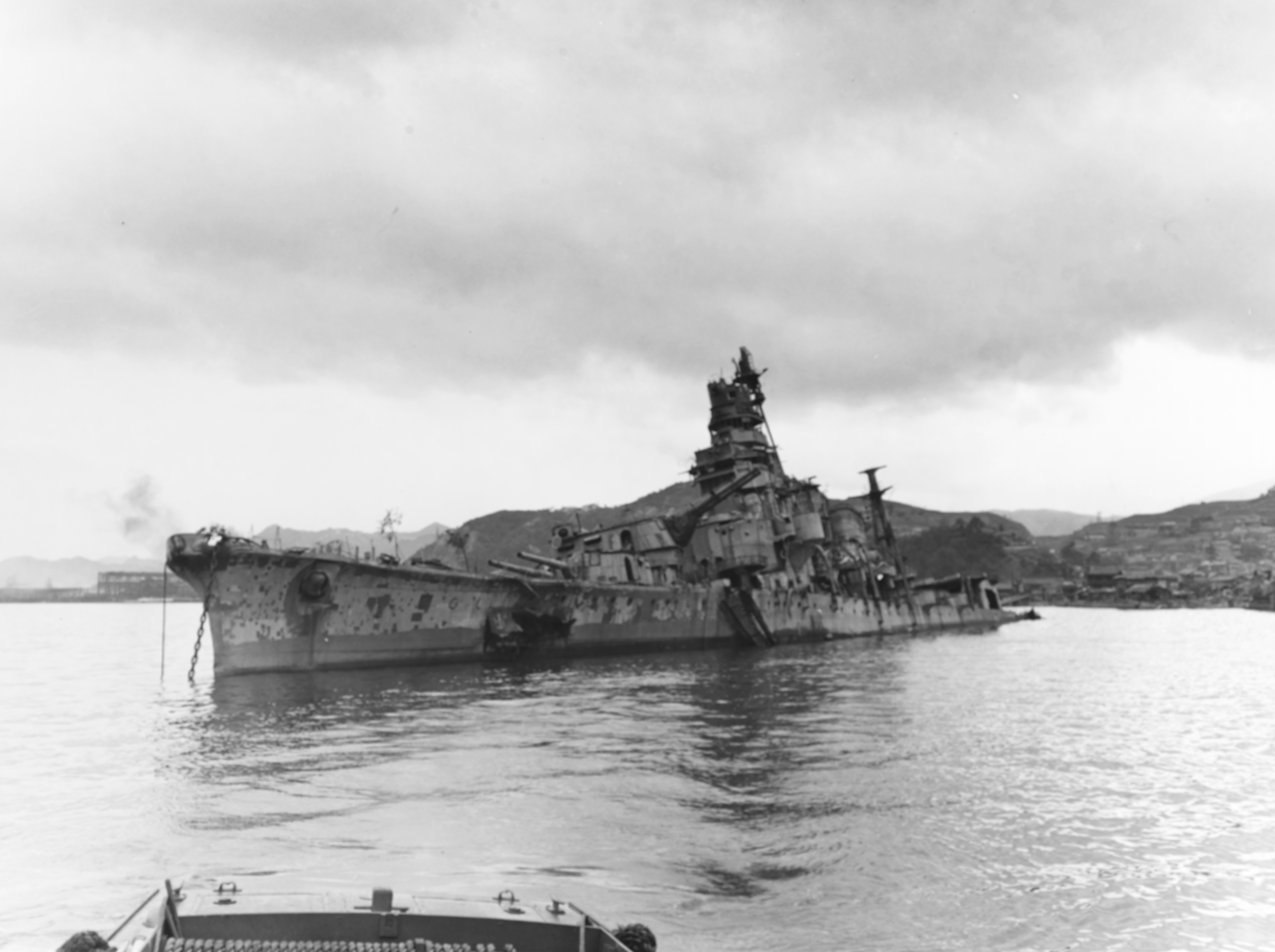
Aoba settled on the bottom of shallow Kure harbor at end of World War II

On 11 October, Aoba accidentally collided with the cruiser Kinu, but the damage was minor. However, on 23 October 1944, Aoba was attacked by the submarine USS Bream. One of six torpedoes hit Aoba in the No. 2 engine room. Aoba limped into Cavite Navy Yard near Manila, but while under emergency repairs the following day and on 29 October the ship was bombed by carrier-based planes from Task Force 38. Repairs still incomplete, Aoba was assigned to a convoy returning to Japan. The convoy was attacked on 6 November off Luzon by the submarines USS Guitarro, Bream, Raton and Ray. Altogether the submarines fired 23 torpedoes, two of which hit the cruiser Kumano, but Aoba escaped without further damage. On arrival at Kure on 12 December, Aoba was examined but declared irreparable and re-rated as a reserve ship.

During a US air raid on Kure harbor on 24 April 1945, Aoba was further damaged by bombing, and settled on the shallow bottom of the harbor. Rather than repair the crippled vessel, four additional twin 25-mm AA guns were fitted around the mainmast, bringing the total number of 25-mm guns to 50 barrels (5x3, 10x2, 15x1). Aoba was re-rated as a floating anti-aircraft battery. On 24 July 1945, about 30 planes from Task Force 38 attacked Kure, and bombed Aoba again. At 2200 hours, Aoba settled to the bottom in 25 feet (7.6 m) of water at 34°14′N 132°30′E. On 28 July 1945, the hulk was again attacked by ten of Task Force 38's carrier aircraft. Four more direct bomb hits set it on fire. The fire attracted 7th Air Force B-24 Liberator bombers, which hit it again with four more 500 pounds (230 kg) bombs, breaking off the stern.

Aoba was formally removed from the Navy List on 20 November 1945. Her wreck was scrapped in 1946–47.

== Sources ==
- Brown, David (1990). Warship Losses of World War Two. Naval Institute Press. ISBN 1-55750-914-X.
- Dull, Paul S. (1978). A Battle History of the Imperial Japanese Navy, 1941–1945. Naval Institute Press. ISBN 0-87021-097-1.
- Jentschura, Hansgeorg; Jung, Dieter & Mickel, Peter (1977). Warships of the Imperial Japanese Navy, 1869–1945. Annapolis, Maryland: United States Naval Institute. ISBN 978-0-87021-893-4.
- Lacroix, Eric & Wells II, Linton (1997). Japanese Cruisers of the Pacific War. Annapolis, Maryland: Naval Institute Press. ISBN 0-87021-311-3.
- Whitley, M. J. (1995). Cruisers of World War Two: An International Encyclopedia. Annapolis, Maryland: Naval Institute Press. ISBN 1-55750-141-6.
