= Japanese cruiser Kinugasa =

Aoba-class cruiser

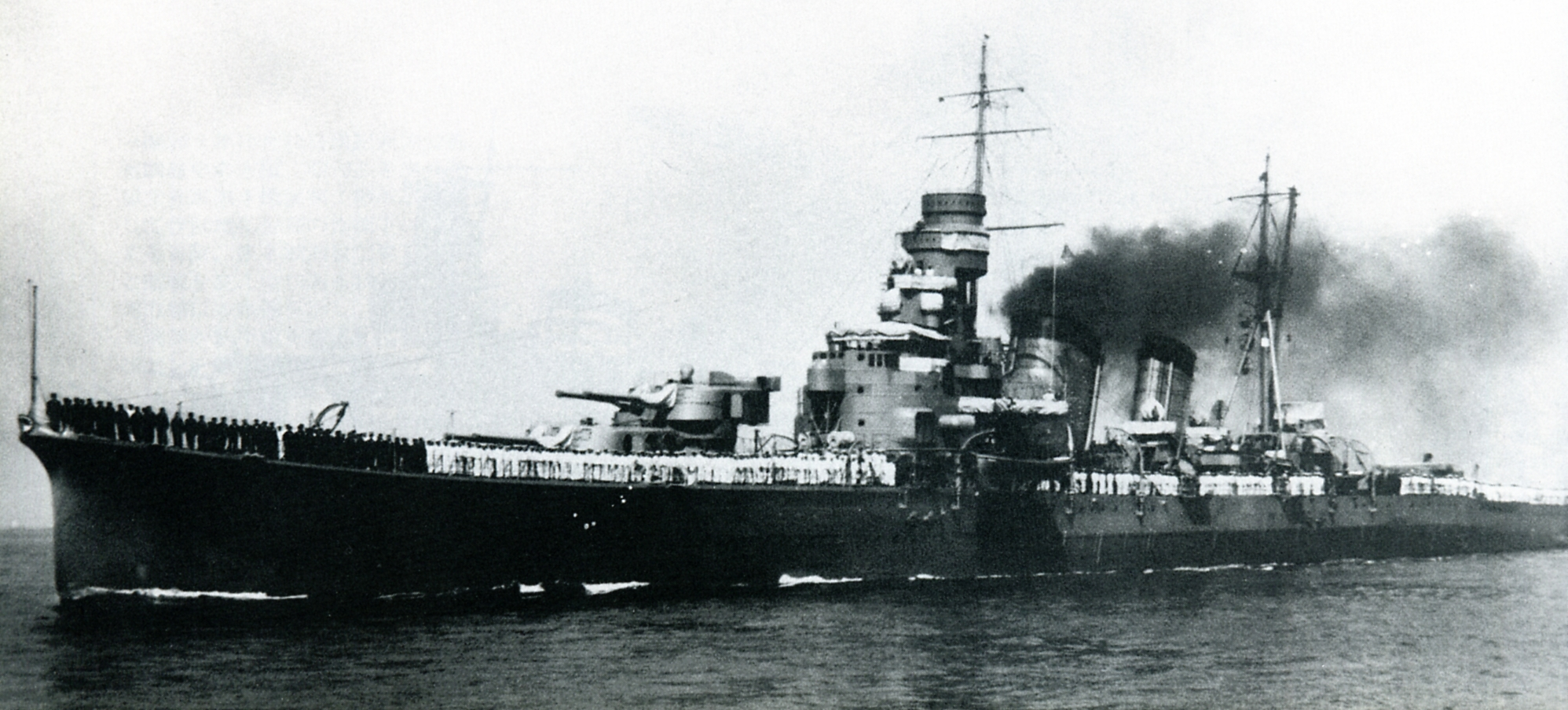
- Heavy cruiser Kinugasa on commissioning at Kobe

History

Empire of Japan
- Name: Kinugasa
- Namesake: Mount Kinugasa
- Ordered: 1923 Fiscal Year
- Builder: Kawasaki Heavy Industries
- Laid down: 24 October 1924
- Launched: 24 October 1926
- Commissioned: 30 September 1927
- Stricken: 15 December 1942
- Fate: Sunk 13 November 1942 by American aircraft during the Naval Battle of Guadalcanal at 08°45′S 157°00′E

General characteristics
- Class & type: Aoba-class heavy cruiser
- Displacement: 8,300 long tons (8,433 t) (standard); 9,000 long tons (9,144 t) (final)
- Length: 185.17 m (607 ft 6 in)
- Beam: 15.83 m (51 ft 11 in) (initial); 17.56 m (57 ft 7 in) (final)
- Draft: 5.71 m (18 ft 9 in) (initial); 5.66 m (18 ft 7 in) (final)
- Installed power: 102,000 shp (76,000 kW)
- Propulsion: 4 × Brown Curtis geared turbines; 12 × Kampon boilers; 4 × shafts
- Speed: 36 kn (67 km/h; 41 mph) – 33.43 kn (61.91 km/h; 38.47 mph)
- Range: As Built: 7,000 nmi (13,000 km; 8,100 mi) at 14 kn (26 km/h; 16 mph); Final: 8,223 nmi (15,229 km; 9,463 mi) at 14 kn (26 km/h; 16 mph)
- Complement: 643 (initial); 657 (final)
- Armament: As Built: 6 × 7.9 in (200 mm)/50 cal Mark I guns (3x2); 4 × 4.7 in (120 mm)/45 cal guns (4x1); 12 × 24 in (610 mm) torpedo tubes (6x2); Final: 6 × 8 in (203 mm)/50 cal Mark II guns (3x2); 4 × 4.7 in (120 mm)/45 cal guns (4x1); 8 × 24 in (610 mm) torpedo tubes (2x4); 50 × Type 96 25 mm (0.98 in) anti-aircraft guns
- Armor: Belt: 76 mm (3.0 in) (belt); Deck: 36 mm (1.4 in) (deck)
- Aircraft carried: 1 × floatplane (initial); 2 × floatplanes (final)
- Aviation facilities: 1 × catapult

Kinugasa (Japanese: 衣笠; named after Mount Kinugasa) was the second vessel in the two-vessel Aoba class of heavy cruisers in the Imperial Japanese Navy. Following the Japanese ship-naming conventions, the ship was named after Mount Kinugasa, located in Yokosuka, Kanagawa, Japan.

== Background ==
Kinugasa and her sister ship Aoba were originally planned as the third and fourth vessels in the Furutaka class of heavy cruisers. However, design issues with the Furutakas resulted in modifications including twin turrets and an aircraft catapult. These modifications created yet more weight to an already top-heavy design, causing stability problems. Nevertheless, Kinugasa played an important role in the opening stages of World War II.

== Service career ==
=== Pre-World War II ===
Kinugasa was completed on 30 September 1927 at the Kawasaki shipyards in Kobe. Her early service was as flagship of the Fifth Squadron (Sentai), and she operated for virtually her entire career with that unit and the Sixth and Seventh Squadrons. In 1928, she became the first Japanese combat ship to carry an aircraft catapult.

During a training exercise on 11 July 1929, the Japanese submarine I-55 accidentally collided with Kinugasa while using Kinugasa as a target. I-55 suffered damage to her bow plating in the collision.

Kinugasa served off the China coast in 1928–1929 and on several occasions during the 1930s. Placed in reserve in September 1937, Kinugasa was extensively modernized at the Sasebo Navy Yard and not recommissioned until the end of October 1940.

=== World War II ===
In 1941, Kinugasa was assigned to Cruiser Division 6 (CruDiv6), as flagship of Rear Admiral Aritomo Goto as part of the First Fleet under overall command of Vice Admiral Takasu Shiro. CruDiv 6 consisted of Kinugasa, Aoba, Furutaka and Kako. At the time of the attack on Pearl Harbor, CruDiv6 was engaged in the invasion of Guam, following which it participated in the second invasion of Wake Island.

From January–May 1942, Kinugasa was based out of Truk, in the Caroline Islands where it provided protection for the landings of Japanese troops in the Solomon Islands and New Guinea at Rabaul, Kavieng, Buka, Shortland, Kieta, Manus Island, Admiralty Islands and Tulagi.

==== Battle of Coral Sea ====
At the Battle of the Coral Sea, CruDiv 6 departed Shortland and effected a rendezvous at sea with the light carrier Shōhō At 11:00 on 7 May 1942, north of Taguli Island, Shōhō was attacked and sunk by 93 Douglas SBD Dauntless dive bombers and Douglas TBD Devastator torpedo bombers from USS Yorktown and Lexington.

The following day, 46 SBDs, 21 TBDs and 15 Grumman F4F Wildcats from Yorktown and Lexington severely damaged the carrier Shōkaku above the waterline and forced her retirement. Furutaka and Kinugasa, undamaged in the battle, escorted Shōkaku back to Truk.

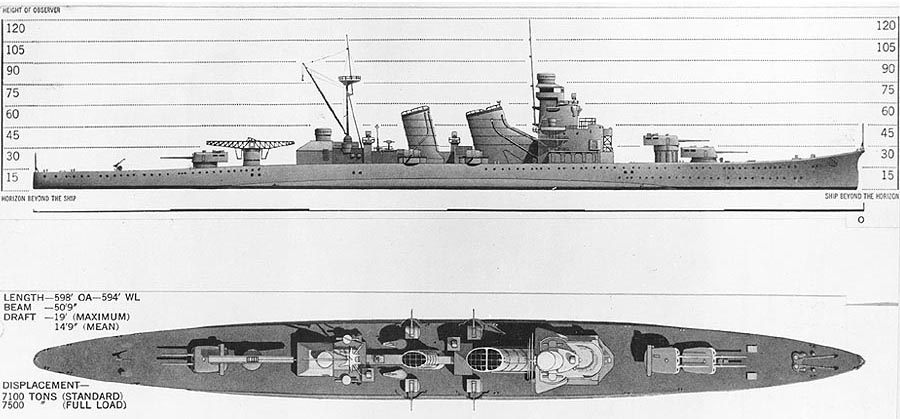
World War II recognition drawing of Kinugasa

Kinugasa was withdrawn to Japan in June 1942 for repairs, and returned to Truk by 4 July. Following the major reorganization of 14 July 1942, Kinugasa came under the newly created Eighth Fleet under Vice Admiral Gunichi Mikawa, based at Rabaul.

==== The Battle of Savo Island ====
In the Battle of Savo Island on 9 August 1942, the four heavy cruisers of CruDiv 6 (Aoba, Kako, Furutaka and Kinugasa), the heavy cruiser Chōkai, light cruisers Tenryū and Yubari and destroyer Yūnagi engaged the Allied forces in a night gun and torpedo action. At about 23:00, Chōkai, Furutaka and Kako all launched their reconnaissance floatplanes. The circling floatplanes dropped flares illuminating the targets and all the Japanese ships opened fire. The Allied cruisers USS Astoria, Quincy, Vincennes and HMAS Canberra were sunk. The cruiser USS Chicago was damaged as were the destroyers USS Ralph Talbot and Patterson. On the Japanese side, Chōkai was hit three times, Kinugasa twice (once in her No. 1 Engine Room by an 8-inch shell from Vincennes that did not explode but caused some damage, killed one man and wounded another, and one in a storeroom aft that was flooded by a 5-inch shell from Patterson), Aoba once, and Furutaka was not damaged.

The heavily laden American invasion transports off Guadalcanal were unprotected, but Admiral Mikawa, unaware that Admiral Fletcher had withdrawn his aircraft carriers covering the invasion, feared an air attack at daybreak and ordered a retirement. Captain Sawa of Kinugasa, frustrated, launched a spread of torpedoes from Kinugasa's starboard tubes at the Allied transports 13 mi (11 nmi; 21 km) distant, but all missed. The following day as CruDiv6 approached Kavieng, Kako was torpedoed and sunk by the US submarine S-44.

==== Battle of Cape Esperance ====
At the Battle of Cape Esperance on 11 October 1942, CruDiv 6's (Aoba, Furutaka and Kinugasa), and destroyers Fubuki and Hatsuyuki departed Shortland to provide cover for a troop reinforcement convoy by shelling Henderson Field on Guadalcanal. The fleet was spotted, coming down "the Slot" at 30 kn (56 km/h; 35 mph), by two Vought OS2U Kingfisher reconnaissance floatplanes.

So alerted, the radar-equipped American cruisers USS San Francisco, Boise, Salt Lake City, and Helena and five destroyers steamed around the end of Guadalcanal to block the entrance to Savo Sound.

At 22:35, Helena's radar spotted the Japanese fleet, and the Americans successfully crossed the Japanese "T". Both fleets opened fire, but Admiral Goto, thinking that he was under friendly fire, ordered a 180-degree turn that exposed each of his ships to the American broadsides.

Aoba was damaged heavily, and Admiral Goto was mortally wounded. Furutaka was hit by a torpedo that flooded her forward engine room and was subsequently sunk by San Francisco, and Duncan.

Kinugasa straddled Boise and Salt Lake City with 8-inch salvos, knocking out Boise's No. 1 and 2 turrets. Kinugasa sustained four hits in the engagement. The following morning, Kinugasa was attacked but not damaged by five American planes, and then returned to Shortland.

Just a few days later, on the night of 14/15 October 1942, Kinugasa returned and together with heavy cruiser Chokai bombarded Henderson Field with a total of 752 8-inch shells. This followed the bombardment from battleships Kongo and Haruna the night before and preceded the bombardment by the heavy cruisers Maya and Myoko the following night.

==== Naval Battle of Guadalcanal ====
From 24–26 October and 1–5 November, Kinugasa and Chōkai provided cover for replacement convoys of troops and equipment to bolster Japanese defenses at Guadalcanal. On 14 November, during the Naval Battle of Guadalcanal, Kinugasa was attacked by Grumman TBF Avenger torpedo bombers and Douglas SBD Dauntlesses from USS Enterprise and USMC Avengers from Guadalcanal on her return trip from an unopposed bombardment of Henderson Field the night before. At 09:36, a 500-pound bomb hit Kinugasa's 13.2 mm (0.5 in) machine gun mount in front of the bridge, starting a fire in the forward gasoline storage area. Captain Sawa and his executive officer were killed by the bomb, and Kinugasa gradually began to list to port. Near-misses caused additional fires and flooding and a second attack by 17 more Dauntlesses knocked out Kinugasa's engines and rudder and opened more compartments to the sea. At 11:22, she capsized and sank southwest of Rendova Island at 08°45′S 157°00′E, taking 511 crewmen with her.

IJNS Kinugasa was removed from the Navy list on 15 December 1942.

== Sources ==
- Brown, David (1990). Warship Losses of World War Two. Naval Institute Press. ISBN 1-55750-914-X.
- Dull, Paul S. (1978). A Battle History of the Imperial Japanese Navy, 1941–1945. Naval Institute Press. ISBN 0-87021-097-1.
- Jentschura, Hansgeorg; Jung, Dieter & Mickel, Peter (1977). Warships of the Imperial Japanese Navy, 1869–1945. Annapolis, Maryland: United States Naval Institute. ISBN 978-0-87021-893-4.
- Lacroix, Eric & Wells II, Linton (1997). Japanese Cruisers of the Pacific War. Annapolis, Maryland: Naval Institute Press. ISBN 0-87021-311-3.
- Whitley, M. J. (1995). Cruisers of World War Two: An International Encyclopedia. Annapolis, Maryland: Naval Institute Press. ISBN 1-55750-141-6.
