= 20 cm/50 3rd Year Type naval gun =

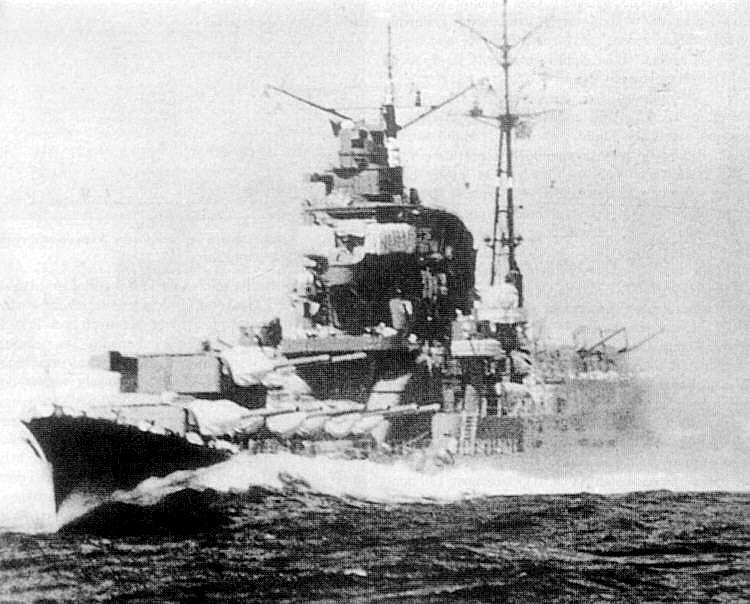
- Tone-class cruiser Chikuma mounted all 4 turrets forward of the bridge.
- Type: Naval gun
- Place of origin: Japan

Service history
- In service: 1926–1945
- Used by: Imperial Japanese Navy
- Wars: Second World War

Production history
- Manufacturer: Kure Naval Arsenal; Muroran Ironworks
- Produced: 1 GÔ (Mark 1) : 1923; 2 GÔ (Mark 2): 1932
- No. built: ~300

Specifications
- Mass: 1 GÔ (Mark 1): 17.6 tonnes 2 GÔ (Mark 2): 18.7 tonnes
- Length: 1 GÔ (Mark 1): 10 metres (33 ft); 2 GÔ (Mark 2): 10.31 metres (33.8 ft)
- Barrel length: 1 GÔ (Mark 1): 9.144 metres (30.00 ft); 2 GÔ (Mark 2): 10 metres (33 ft)
- Shell: 1 GÔ (Mark 1): 110 kilograms (240 lb); 2 GÔ (Mark 2): 126 kilograms (278 lb)
- Calibre: 1 GÔ (Mark 1): 20-centimetre (7.874 in); 2 GÔ (Mark 2): 8-inch (203.2 mm)
- Muzzle velocity: 835 m/s (2,740 ft/s)
- Maximum firing range: 29 kilometres (18 mi)

Third year type 20 cm/50 caliber guns (五十口径三年式二〇糎砲, gojūkōkei sannenshiki ni-maru centi-hō) formed the main battery of Japan's World War II heavy cruisers. These guns were also mounted on two early aircraft carriers, the Kaga and the Akagi before their 1935 reconstruction. The typical installation was ten 20 cm/50 guns; although Tone-class cruisers carried eight while Furutaka and Aoba-class cruisers carried six. After modernization, Akagi and Kaga carried only six, divided in three casemates per side, after the removal (during the 1935 reconstruction) of the four guns in two turrets on both ships placed on the second deck.

These were built-up guns with an inner A tube, encased by a second tube, encased by a full length jacket. Early guns were partially wire-wound, but later guns dispensed with the wire winding. The guns were breech loaded with two cloth bags of smokeless powder. Third year type refers to the Welin breech block on this gun. Breech block design began in 1914 AD, the third year of the Taishō period. This breech block design was also used on Japanese 41 cm (16.1 inch), 15.5 cm (6 inch), 14 cm (5.5 inch), 12.7 cm (5 inch), and 12 cm (4.7 inch) naval guns.

== 1 GÔ (Mark I) guns ==
The first model of this gun used a 32.63 kg (71.9 lb) powder charge to fire 7.87 in (200 mm) projectiles weighing 110 kg (242.5 lb) at a velocity of 870 m/s (2,854 ft/s). Useful life was 300 effective full charges (EFC) per gun. These guns were initially installed in type A low-angle (25°) single mounts aboard Furutaka-class cruisers, in type C (40°) twin turrets in the Aoba class, and in type D (40°) twin turrets in the Myōkō class. Mark I guns can be visually distinguished from Mark II guns by an abrupt step in the chase diameter which was absent on the latter guns.

== 2 GÔ (Mark II) guns ==
Second model guns used a 33.8 kg (74.5 lb) powder charge to fire 8 in (203.2 mm) projectiles weighing 125.85 kg (277.5 lb) at a velocity of 835 m/s (2,740 ft/s). These guns had a useful life expectancy of 320 to 400 EFC (Effective/Equivalent Full Charge). Rate of fire varied from four rounds per minute firing at low angles diminishing to two or three rounds per minute firing at maximum elevation. These guns and the type E twin turret with 70-degree elevation installed on Takao-class cruisers were influenced by Royal Navy County-class cruisers. Type E turrets were promptly redesigned to limit elevation to 55 degrees when 70-degree elevation proved impractical. Modified type E turrets were installed as original equipment aboard Maya and the Tone-class cruisers, and replaced the original turrets aboard Furutaka and Mogami-class cruisers. Mark II guns replaced the original Mark I guns in type C and D turrets so all Japanese heavy cruisers carried Mark II guns in twin turrets by December 1941.

== Aircraft carrier installations ==
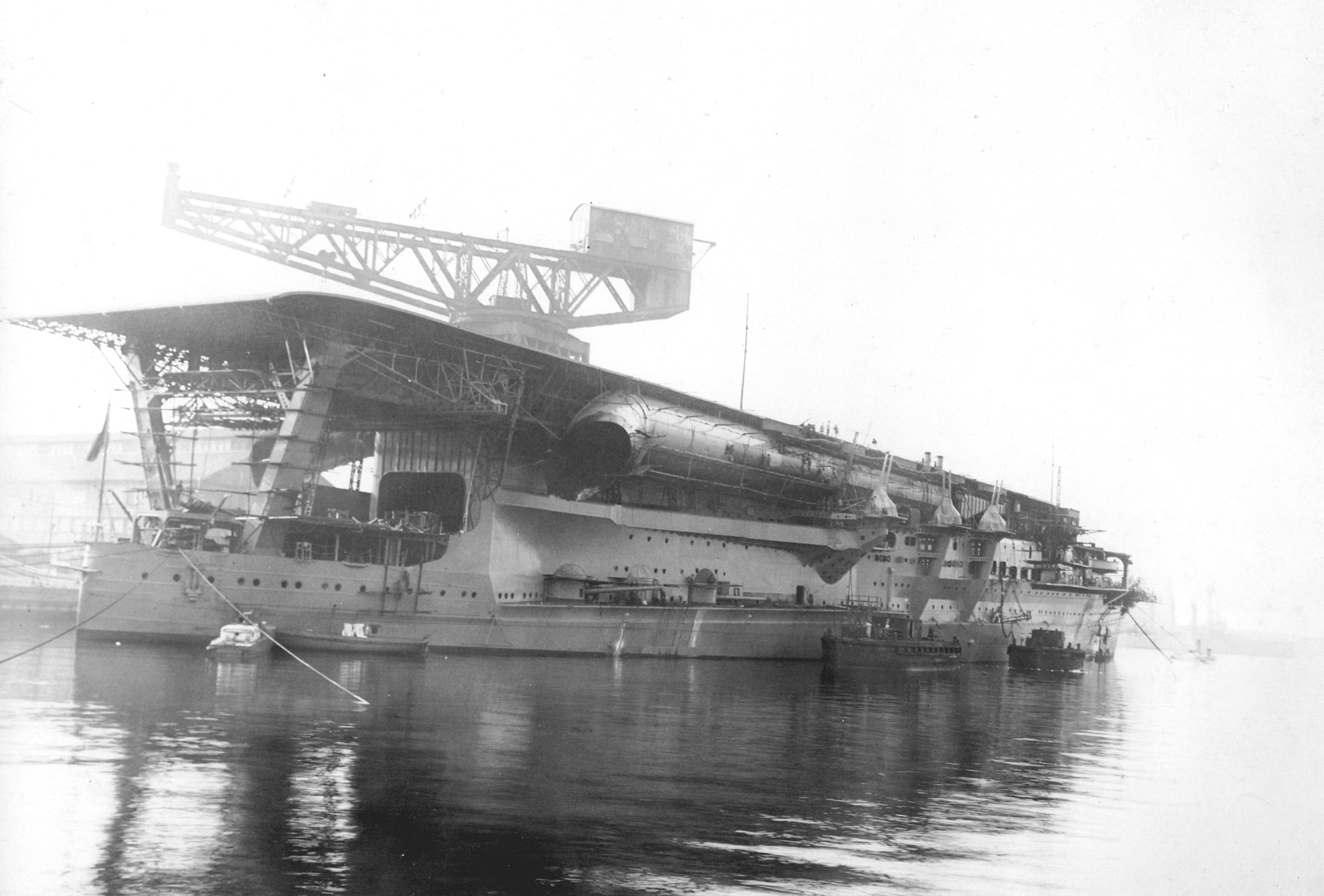
Starboard quarter of Kaga with three casemate guns visible.

Mark I guns were installed in casemates with a maximum elevation of 25 degrees limiting maximum range to 22 kilometers (14 mi). Aircraft carriers originally had four guns mounted in two type B twin turrets with a maximum elevation of 70 degrees. These were transferred to casemates in Kaga in 1934 and simply removed from Akagi in 1936.

== Ammunition ==
Shell weights and muzzle velocities for high explosive or San Shiki incendiary shrapnel are specified for each of the Marks above. Infobox muzzle velocity applies to type 91 armor-piercing (AP) shells with trajectory information below. Illuminating shells were fired with a reduced charge at a muzzle velocity of 710 meters per second (2330 ft/sec).

== Type 91 AP shell trajectory ==
Range	Elevation	Descent	Impact velocity
5 km (3.1 mi)	2° 24′	3°	2,133 ft/s (650 m/s)
10 km (6.2 mi)	5° 18′	7° 30′	1,634 ft/s (498 m/s)
15 km (9.3 mi)	10° 30′	15° 48′	1,299 ft/s (396 m/s)
20 km (12 mi)	18°	29°	1,194 ft/s (364 m/s)
25 km (16 mi)	30°	47°	1,247 ft/s (380 m/s)

== Gun mounts ==
=== Type A ===
Only Mark I guns were installed in type A mounts. Maximum elevation was 25° in the six single mounts installed aboard Furutaka-class cruisers in 1926, in the six casemate mountings installed on aircraft carriers Akagi in 1927 and Kaga in 1930, and in the four casemate mountings added to Kaga in 1934.

=== Type B ===
Only Mark I guns were installed in type B mounts. Maximum elevation was 70° in the two twin turrets installed aboard Akagi in 1927 and Kaga in 1930. These turrets were removed from Kaga in 1934 and from Akagi in 1936. Guns removed in 1934 were transferred to additional casemates aboard Kaga, but those removed in 1936 from Akagi were not replaced.

=== Type C ===
Three twin turrets with maximum elevation of 40° were installed only aboard Aoba-class cruisers. The Mark I guns installed in 1927 were replaced by Mark II guns in 1937 and 1938.

=== Type D ===
Five twin turrets with maximum elevation of 40° were installed only aboard Myōkō-class cruisers. The Mark I guns installed in 1928 and 1929 were replaced by Mark II guns between 1931 and 1934.

=== Type E ===
Only Mark II guns were installed in type E twin turrets. Maximum elevation was 70° in the five turrets installed aboard Atago, Takao, and Chōkai in 1932. Early recognition of the impracticality of using these guns for anti-aircraft fire caused reduction of maximum elevation to 55° in all subsequent installations. Maya received five 55° turrets as original equipment in 1932. Three new turrets with Mark I guns from Haguro and Ashigara re-bored to Mark II (as there was a shortage of Mark II guns at this time) replaced the original type A mounts aboard Furutaka-class cruisers in 1936 and 1937. Tone-class cruisers were completed with four type E turrets in 1937 and 1938. Five new turrets replaced the original triple 6-inch turrets aboard Mogami class cruisers between 1939 and 1941.

== Wartime installations of 3 Nendo Shiki 20 cm/50 caliber guns ==
Ship	Gun Installation
Akagi	6 Mark I guns in type A casemates with 25° elevation
Aoba	3 type C twin turrets with 40° elevation
Ashigara	5 type D twin turrets with 40° elevation
Atago	5 type E twin turrets with 70° elevation
Chikuma	4 type E twin turrets with 55° elevation
Chōkai	5 type E twin turrets with 70° elevation
Furutaka	3 type E twin turrets with 55° elevation
Haguro	5 type D twin turrets with 40° elevation
Kaga	10 Mark I guns in type A casemates with 25° elevation
Kako	3 type E twin turrets with 55° elevation
Kinugasa	3 type C twin turrets with 40° elevation
Kumano	5 type E twin turrets with 55° elevation
Maya	5 type E twin turrets with 55° elevation
Mikuma	5 type E twin turrets with 55° elevation
Mogami	5 type E twin turrets with 55° elevation
Myōkō	5 type D twin turrets with 40° elevation
Nachi	5 type D twin turrets with 40° elevation
Sri Ayudhya	2 type D twin turrets with 40° elevation
Suzuya	5 type E twin turrets with 55° elevation
Takao	5 type E twin turrets with 70° elevation
Thonburi	2 type D twin turrets with 40° elevation
Tone	4 type E twin turrets with 55° elevation

- Furutaka-class heavy cruisers: Furutaka, Kako
  - till 1937: 6 7.9-inch type A 25°
  - from 1937: 3 twin 8.0-inch (re-bored) type E 55°
- Aoba-class heavy cruisers: Aoba, Kinugasa
  - till 1938: 3 twin 7.9-inch type C 40°
  - from 1938: 3 twin 8.0-inch type C 40°
- Myoko-class heavy cruisers: Myoko, Nachi, Ashigara, Haguro
  - till 1934: 5 twin 7.9-inch type D 40°
  - from 1934: 5 twin 8.0-inch type D 40°
- Takao-class heavy cruisers
  - Takao, Atago, Chokai
    - 5 twin 8.0-inch type E 70°
  - Maya
    - 5 twin 8.0-inch type E 55°
- Mogami-class heavy cruisers: Mogami, Mikuma, Kumano, Suzuya
  - till 1939: 5 triple 6.1-inch 55° (classified as light cruiser)
  - from 1939: 5 twin 8.0-inch type E 55°
- Tone-class heavy cruisers: Tone, Chikuma
  - 4 twin 8.0-inch type E 55°

== See also ==
=== Weapons of comparable role, performance and era ===
- 203mm/50 Modèle 1924 gun French equivalent
- 20.3 cm SK C/34 Naval gun German equivalent
- 203 mm /53 Italian naval gun Italian equivalent
- BL 8 inch Mk VIII naval gun UK equivalent
- 8"/55 caliber gun US equivalent
