= Myōkō-class cruiser =

Japanese Navy ship

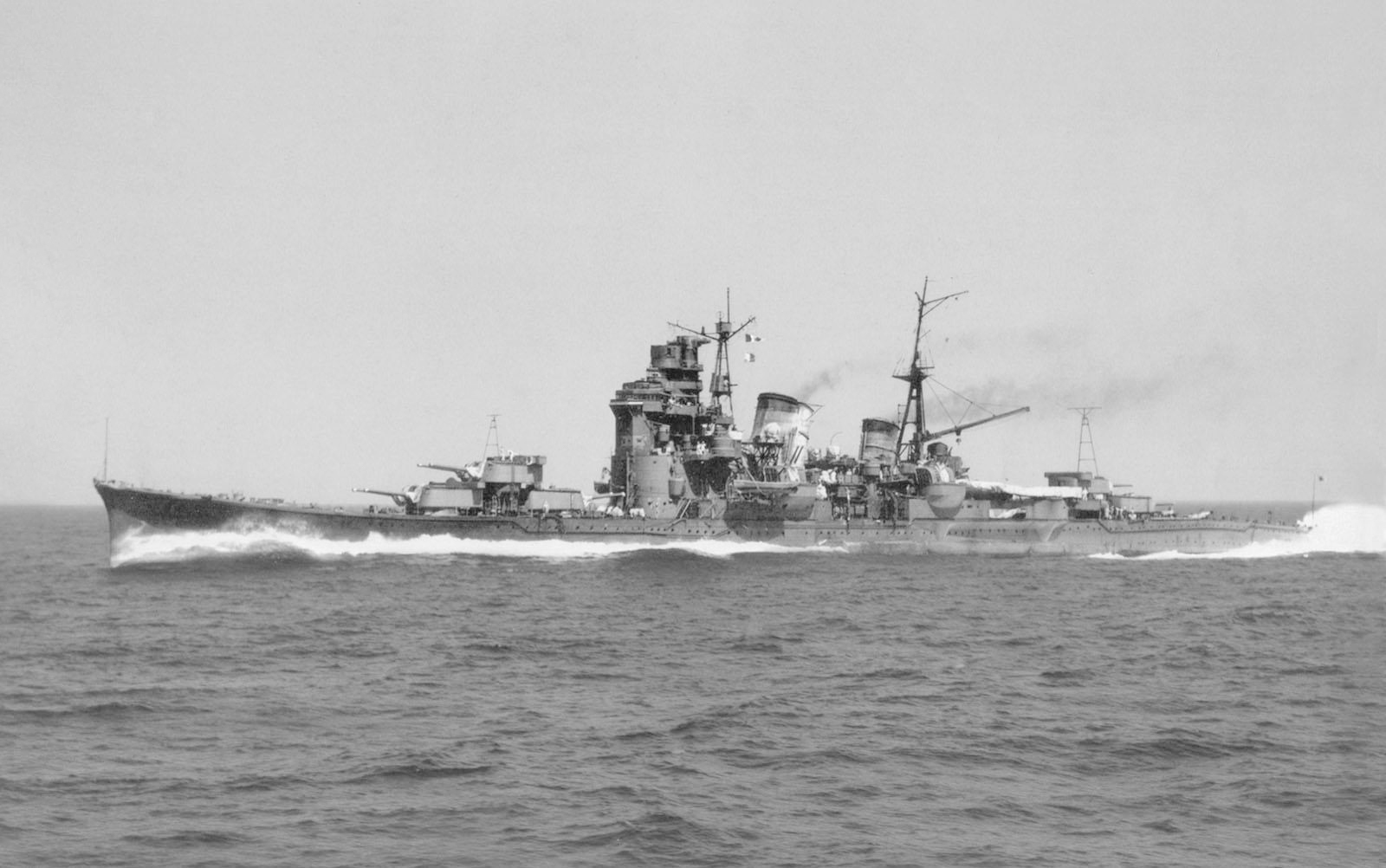
- Myōkō on sea trials following her second modernization, November 1941

Class overview
- Name: Myōkō class
- Builders: Yokosuka Naval Arsenal; Kure Naval Arsenal; Mitsubishi Shipbuilding, Nagasaki; Kawasaki Dockyard, Kobe
- Operators: Imperial Japanese Navy
- Preceded by: Aoba class
- Succeeded by: Takao class
- Built: 1924–1929
- In commission: 1928–1946
- Completed: 4
- Lost: 3

General characteristics
- Type: Heavy cruiser
- Displacement: 11,633 tons (standard load) 14,980 tons (full load)
- Length: 204 m (669 ft) overall
- Beam: 19.5 m (64 ft)
- Draught: 6.36 m (20.9 ft)
- Propulsion: 4-shaft geared turbines; 12 Kampon boilers; 130,000 shp
- Speed: 35.5 knots (40.9 mph; 65.7 km/h)
- Range: 8,000 nmi (15,000 km) at 14 kn (16 mph; 26 km/h)
- Complement: 773
- Armament: 10 × 20 cm (7.9 in) guns (5×2); 6 × 4.7 in (120 mm)/45 guns (6×1); 12 × 610 mm (24 in) torpedo tubes
- Armour: Belt: 102mm; Deck: 35mm; Barbette: 76mm; Turret: 25mm
- Aircraft carried: 2
- Aviation facilities: 1 catapult

The Myōkō-class cruisers (妙高型巡洋艦, Myōkō-gata jun'yōkan) were a series of four heavy cruisers built for the Imperial Japanese Navy in the late 1920s. Three were lost during World War II.

The ships of this class displaced 11,633 tons (standard), were 201 metres (659 ft) long, and were capable of steaming at 36 knots (67 km/h; 41 mph). Their main armament were ten 20 cm/50 3rd Year Type naval guns in five twin turrets which were complemented by a heavy torpedo armament; at the time, this was the heaviest armament of any cruiser class in the world. They were also the first cruisers the Japanese Navy constructed that exceeded the (10,000 ton) limit set by the Washington Naval Treaty.

== Design ==
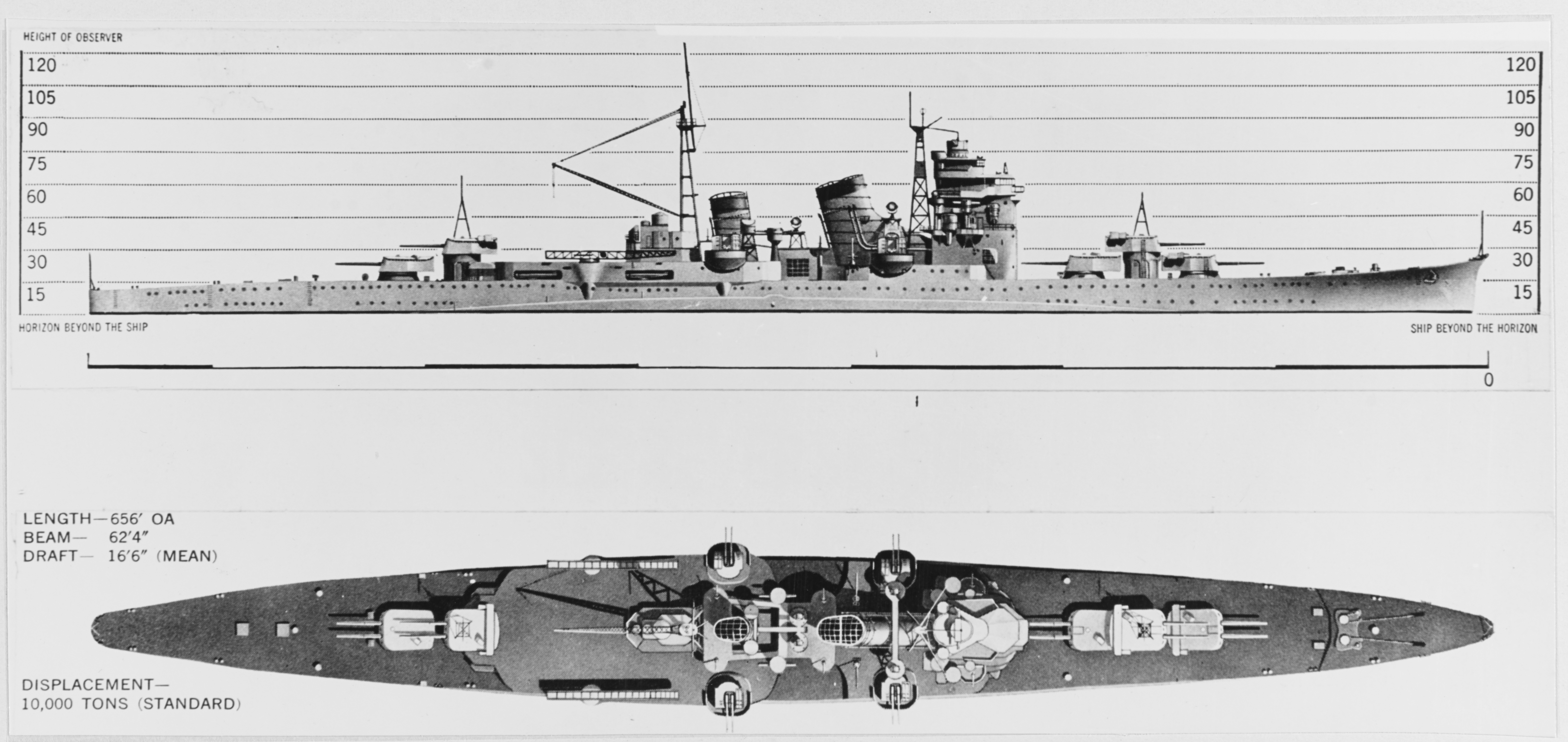
United States Navy recognition drawings of the Myōkō-class cruiser Nachi

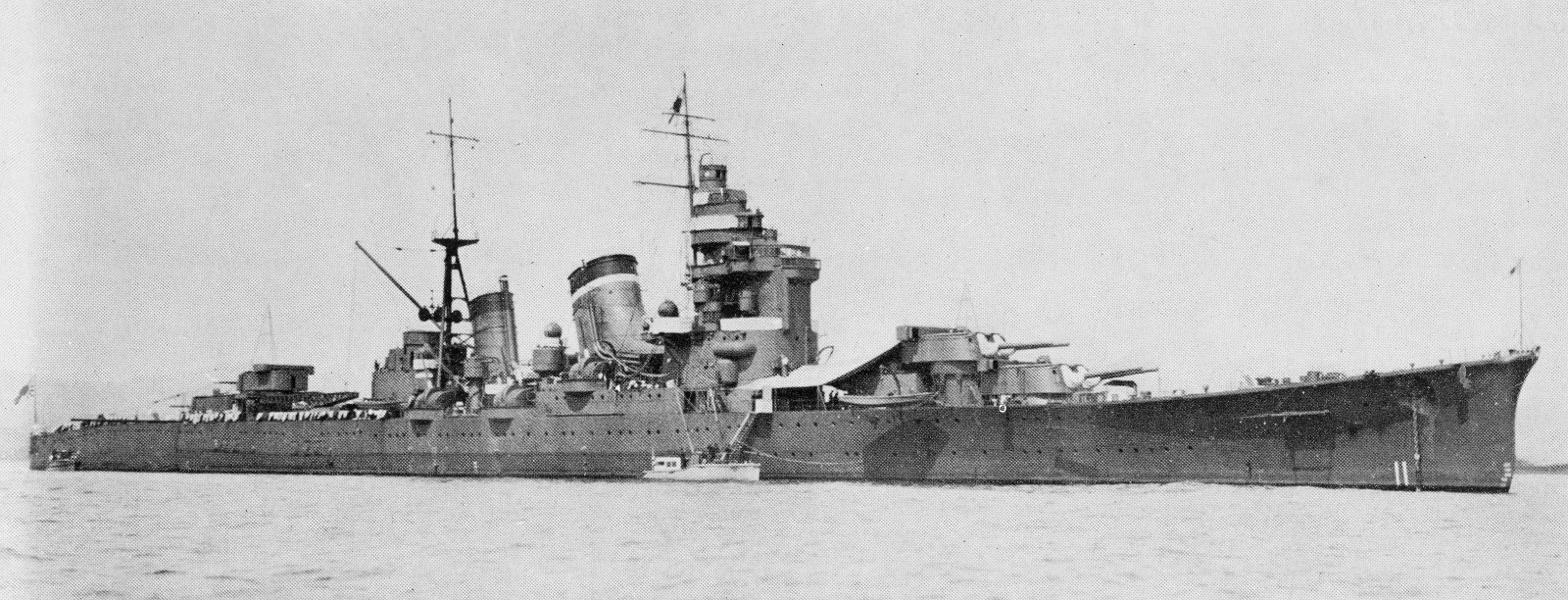
Myōkō at anchor, 1931.

The Myōkō class displaced 13,500 t (13,300 long tons), with a hull design similar to the preceding Aoba-class cruiser. The displacement was substantially more than the designed 2/3 trial displacement of 11,850 t (11,660 long tons), a consequence of the demand to put as much as possible on a hull limited by the Washington Naval Treaty, and were likely unintentional as it adversely affected the seakeeping qualities and endurance of the class. They were 203.8 metres (669 ft) long with a beam of 19.5 metres (64 ft), and a draft of 6.36 metres (20.9 ft). Propulsion was by 12 Kampon boilers driving four sets of single-impulse geared turbine engines, with four shafts turning three-bladed propellers propelling the ship to 35.5 knots (65.7 km/h; 40.9 mph). Design endurance was 8,000 nautical miles; however, the increased weight issues reduced it to 7,000.

Protection was superior to the preceding Aoba class and accounted for about 16 percent of trial displacement. A 102 mm (4 in) side belt that ran along 123 m (404 ft) of the ship's length and 35 mm (1.4 in) armored deck protected the magazine and machinery spaces and 76 mm (3 in) protected the turret barbettes; however, the turrets had only 25mm splinter protection and the bridge was unarmored. Following innovations pioneered in Yubari, the armor belt was made an integral part of the hull structure to reduce weight. A torpedo bulkhead consisting of two 29 mm (1.1 in) plates with a total thickness of 58 mm (2.3 in) extended inwards from the bottom of the armor belt and curved to meet the bottom of the double hull. It was calculated that it was sufficient to withstand an explosion of 200 kg (441 lb) of TNT. As originally constructed, the class was armed with a main battery of ten 200 mm (7.9 in) 20 cm/50 3rd Year Type 1 GÔ naval guns mounted in 5 twin turrets, the heaviest armament of any heavy cruiser in the world at the time. Secondary armament initially were 12 cm/45 10th Year Type dual purpose guns in six single mounts. Short-range anti-aircraft defense was provided by two 7.7mm machine guns. Torpedo armament was unusually heavy compared to the cruisers of other nations at the time, with 12 carried in fixed single launchers inside the hull. They were also equipped with a single aircraft catapult and aircraft for scouting purposes.

=== Modernizations ===
The class was modernized twice before the outbreak of the Pacific War. The first modernization program, carried out between 1934 and 1936, was the most extensive. The main armament was upgraded to the 203 mm (8 in) 2 GÔ versions and the 120mm guns replaced with eight 12.7 cm/40 Type 89 dual purpose guns in twin mounts. The single catapult was replaced with an aircraft deck that could accommodate three aircraft and two catapults. The fixed torpedo tubes in the hull were removed and two quadruple launchers carrying the Type 93 Long Lance torpedo were installed under the aircraft deck. The torpedo bulges were extended to increase stability. The modifications added 680 tons of displacement and reduced speed to 34 knots (63 km/h; 39 mph). Anti-aircraft protection was increased to eight 13mm machine guns in two quadruple mounts.

The second modernization in 1939 added an additional two quadruple torpedo launchers and enhanced light anti-aircraft armament with the introduction of the Type 96 25mm gun. The aircraft catapults were upgraded to handle heavier floatplanes and the torpedo bulges were enlarged to increase stability.

The class would receive upgrades during the Second World War to reflect the growing threat of aircraft in the form of numerous Type 96 25mm gun and air and surface search radar, Myōkō eventually receiving 52 25mm autocannons in various single, double, and triple mounts. The two aft quadruple torpedo mounts were removed in 1944 to allow for the growing number of anti-aircraft armament.

== Career ==
The Myōkō class saw a series of peacetime patrol duties throughout the inter war years. Throughout 1937, Ashigara toured across Europe, before assisting the grounded ocean liner SS President Hoover. The four ships all saw convoy escorting and wartime patrol duties during the Second Sino-Japanese War, but none saw direct combat.

== World War II ==
With the start of World War II, the class spent the early war career supporting the invasion of the Philippines and Dutch East Indies, escorting invasion convoys before taking part in vigorous shore bombardment duties to support said invasion convoys. Throughout these efforts, the ships of the class often came under attacks from B-17 bombs, but only Myōkō herself was damaged by a single 500-pound bomb on January 4, 1942.

=== Battle of the Java Sea ===
Haguro and Nachi spearheaded the devastating naval victory that became known as the battle of the Java Sea. On February 26, while escorting an invasion convoy through the Java Sea, a floatplane from Nachi spotted an allied task force of two heavy cruisers, three light cruisers, and nine destroyers, and steamed to intercept. Making contact on the 27th, both ships opened fire. Haguro damaged the light cruiser De Ruyter with two shell hits, while Nachi damaged the heavy cruiser USS Houston with two shell hits. Haguro then switched fire to the heavy cruiser HMS Exeter at 22,000 yards, hitting her with two 20.3 cm (8 in) shells. One was a dud, but the other destroyed half of her boilers and cut her speed to 5 knots, forcing her to retire from the battle. Almost immediately afterwards, Haguro fired a spread of torpedoes, one of which hit the destroyer Kortenaer, which blew in half and sank nearly instantly. Launched from around 22,000 yards, this would be one of the longest ranged naval hits ever fired.

Later that midnight, Haguro and Nachi tracked down the allied force again, and closed to around 16,000 yards. Nachi fired eight more torpedoes, while Haguro fired four. A torpedo from Nachi hit the light cruiser Java, which ignited her amidships magazines and blew her in two and sank her in under two minutes. Four minutes later, a torpedo from Haguro hit the aforementioned light cruiser De Ruyter, sinking her over three hours and killing Admiral Karel Doorman. Depending on the source, they were either undetected, or were spotted but the allied gunfire was ineffective.

On the night of March 1, Haguro and Nachi, joined by Myōkō and Ashigara, tracked down Exeter, still crippled from Haguro's shell hit, and opened fire. Subsequent gunfire hits disabled Exeter's remaining boilers, engine, guns, and electrical power and lit her aflame, leading to her crew scuttling her. Haguro and Nachi were almost entirely out of ammo and retreated, while Myōkō and Ashigara combined fire to sink the destroyer HMS Encounter. The destroyer USS Pope initially escaped but was crippled by planes from the light carrier Ryūjō and later finished off by Myōkō and Ashigara.

== Ships in class ==
The ships in the class were:

Construction data
| Name | Kanji | Builder | Laid | Launched | Commissioned | Fate |
|---|---|---|---|---|---|---|
| Myōkō | 妙高 | Yokosuka Naval Arsenal | 25 October 1924 | 16 April 1927 | 31 July 1929 | Captured 21 September 1945 at Singapore. Scuttled in the Strait of Malacca, 8 July 1946 |
| Nachi | 那智 | Kure Naval Arsenal | 26 November 1924 | 15 June 1927 | 26 November 1928 | Sunk 4 November 1944 in Manila Bay by aircraft from USS Lexington |
| Haguro | 羽黒 | Mitsubishi Shipbuilding and Engineering Company, Nagasaki Yard | 16 March 1925 | 24 March 1928 | 25 April 1929 | Sunk 16 May 1945 in the Strait of Malacca by the Royal Navy 26th Destroyer Flotilla |
| Ashigara | 足柄 | Kawasaki Dockyard Company, Kobe Yard | 11 April 1925 | 22 April 1928 | 20 August 1929 | Sunk 8 June 1945 in Bangka Strait by the submarine HMS Trenchant |
