= Aoba-class cruiser =

Cruiser class of the Imperial Japanese Navy

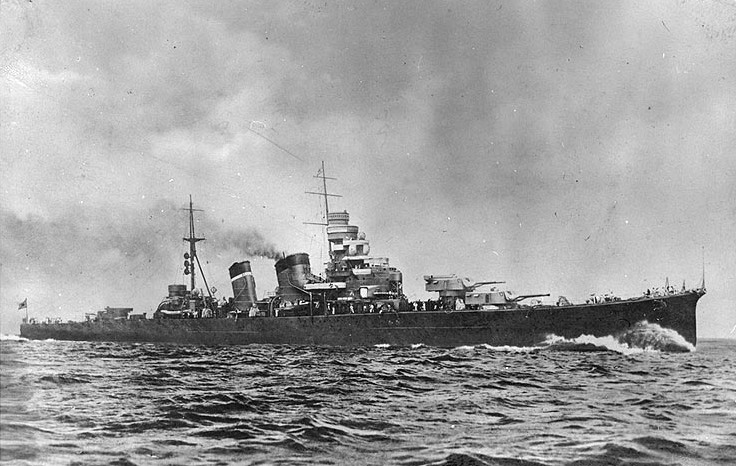
- Aoba soon after completion

Class overview
- Name: Aoba class
- Builders: Mitsubishi Shipbuilding & Eng., Nagasaki; Kawasaki Dockyard, Kobe
- Operators: Imperial Japanese Navy
- Preceded by: Furutaka class
- Succeeded by: Myōkō class
- In commission: 20 September 1927 – 28 July 1945
- Planned: 2
- Completed: 2
- Lost: 2

General characteristics (as per Whitley)
- Type: Heavy cruiser
- Displacement: 7,100 tons standard; 8,900 tons full load
- Length: 185 m (607 ft) (overall)
- Beam: 16 m (52 ft)
- Draught: 5.8 m (19 ft)
- Propulsion: 4-shaft Parsons geared turbines; 12 Kampon boilers; 102,000 shp (76,000 kW)
- Speed: 34 knots (63 km/h)
- Range: 6,000 nmi (11,000 km) at 14 kn (26 km/h)
- Complement: 625
- Armament: (initial); 6 × 20 cm (7.9 in)/50-cal Mark I guns (3 × 2); 4 × 12 cm (4.7 in)/45-cal (4 × 1); 12 × 61 cm (24 in) torpedo tubes (6 × 2); (final); 6 × 8 in (203 mm)/50-cal Mark II guns (3 × 2); 4 × 12 cm (4.7 in)/45-cal (4 × 1); 8 × 25 mm (4 × 2) machine guns; 8 × 61 cm (24 in) Type 93 torpedo tubes (2 × 4)
- Armor: Belt: 76 mm (3 in); Magazine: 51 mm (2 in); Turrets: 25.4 mm (1 in); Conning tower: none; Decks: 35 mm (1.4 in); Upper Decks: 48 mm (1.9 in)
- Aircraft carried: (initial) 1, (final) 2
- Aviation facilities: 1 catapult

The Aoba-class cruisers (青葉型巡洋艦, Aoba-gata jun'yōkan) were a class of two heavy cruisers constructed for the Imperial Japanese Navy (IJN) which saw service during World War II.

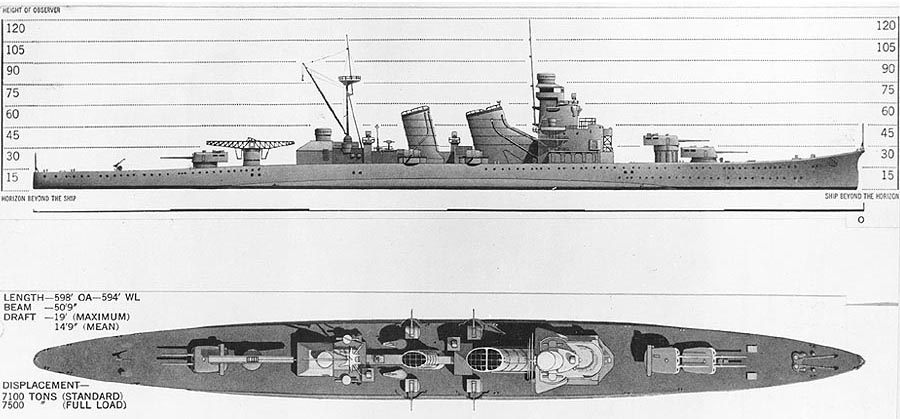
World War II recognition drawing of the Aoba class

== Design ==
The Furutaka class of heavy cruisers (also called "A class" cruisers in the Imperial Japanese Navy) was originally planned to include Aoba and her sister ship Kinugasa. The two ships were laid down in early 1924 with that intent.

In 1924 the IJN Naval General Staff pressured the acting head of the Basic Design Section, Kikuo Fujimoto, to use the newly designed twin 20 cm (7.9 in) "type C" gun turrets on the Furutaka-class ships. Fujimoto agreed to modify Aoba and Kinugasa, but it was already too late to retrofit Furutaka and Kako, which had been laid down in late 1922. The two ships were subsequently renamed as a separate class, but Furutaka and Kako were eventually upgraded with twin turrets in 1937 when all four ships received 203mm main guns.

The modifications were significant. The six 20 cm (7.9 in) semi-turrets, 1 through 6, were replaced by three twin turrets, two fore and one aft. The main superstructure was also modified to accommodate the different fire control requirements of the twin turrets. Other design modifications included using 12 cm (4.7 in)/45-cal HA guns rather than the 7.62 cm (3 in) guns. The airplane takeoff platform, part of which mounted atop the number 4 semi-turret, was replaced with a catapult fitted just fore of the No.3 twin turret. The superstructure aft of the funnels was extensively modified due to the new catapult. The catapults weren't ready before the ships were commissioned. Kinugasa had a compressed-air unit mounted in March 1928, while Aoba had a gunpowder-propelled model mounted in March 1929.

Aoba and Kinugasa were otherwise built on the same hull as Furutaka and Kako, with identical machinery and armor.

As built the Aoba was more than 900 tons heavier than its design weight, with negative effects on the performance of the ships similar to that of the Furutaka-class' overweight condition.

== Modernization ==
In 1930, the Naval General Staff, concerned by the limitations on the size of their navy by the London Naval Treaty won approval for an extensive modernization program of the "A class" cruisers. To offset the numerical superiority the U.S. Navy enjoyed, the planned upgrades included the latest weapons, protection, fire control systems, and communication equipment.

In the spring of 1930 the two ships had their manually operated 12 cm anti-aircraft guns replaced with improved electro-hydraulically operated units. Kinugasa was refitted with a gunpowder-propelled catapult a year later.

Extensive modernization of the ships began in late 1938, lasting until they were recommissioned two years later, as follows:

The 20 cm (7.9 in)/50-cal Mark I main battery was replaced by 8 in (203 mm)/50-cal Mark II guns. Although turrets and gun mounts were unchanged, the powder and shell hoists were modified for the larger shells and to prevent flarebacks in the turrets from traveling to the magazines. Light anti-aircraft defenses were improved by 4 twin sets of 25 mm machine guns and 2 twin 13.2 mm (0.52 in) machine guns. The 6 pairs (3 per side) of fixed torpedo tubes mounted on the middle deck were replaced with 2 quadruple mounts using the powerful Type 93 torpedo, located on the upper deck, one on each side of the catapult.

The bridge structure was rebuilt almost identically to the Furutaka class modifications to accommodate the latest rangefinders and fire control equipment for the main battery, antiaircraft and torpedoes.

Of the twelve original boilers, two smaller ones were mixed-fuel capable. They were replaced with oil-fired units. Their coal bunkers were replaced with fuel-oil tanks.

The above modifications added 576 tons to the ships. To prevent the draft from increasing even more, and to improve stability, bulges were added, simultaneously enhancing anti-torpedo protection. As a result, the ships' beam was increased 1.56 m (5 ft 1 in) to 17.56 m (57.6 ft).

== Ships in class ==
List of Aoba-class cruisers
Name	Builder	Laid down	Launched	Commissioned	Fate
Aoba	Mitsubishi Nagasaki Shipyard	23 January 1924	25 September 1926	20 September 1927	Sunk 28 July 1945 during Bombing of Kure. Raised and scrapped in 1946–47.
Kinugasa	Kōbe-Kawasaki Shipbuilding Yard	24 October 1924	24 October 1926	30 September 1927	Sunk 14 November 1942 at Naval Battle of Guadalcanal

== Books ==
- Jentschura, Hansgeorg; Jung, Dieter & Mickel, Peter (1977). Warships of the Imperial Japanese Navy, 1869–1945. Annapolis, Maryland: United States Naval Institute. ISBN 978-0-87021-893-4.
- Lacroix, Eric & Wells II, Linton (1997). Japanese Cruisers of the Pacific War. Annapolis, Maryland: Naval Institute Press. ISBN 0-87021-311-3.
- Whitley, M. J. (1995). Cruisers of World War Two: An International Encyclopedia. Annapolis, Maryland: Naval Institute Press. ISBN 1-55750-141-6.
