= Mount Aoba =

Mountain in Fukui Prefecture, Japan

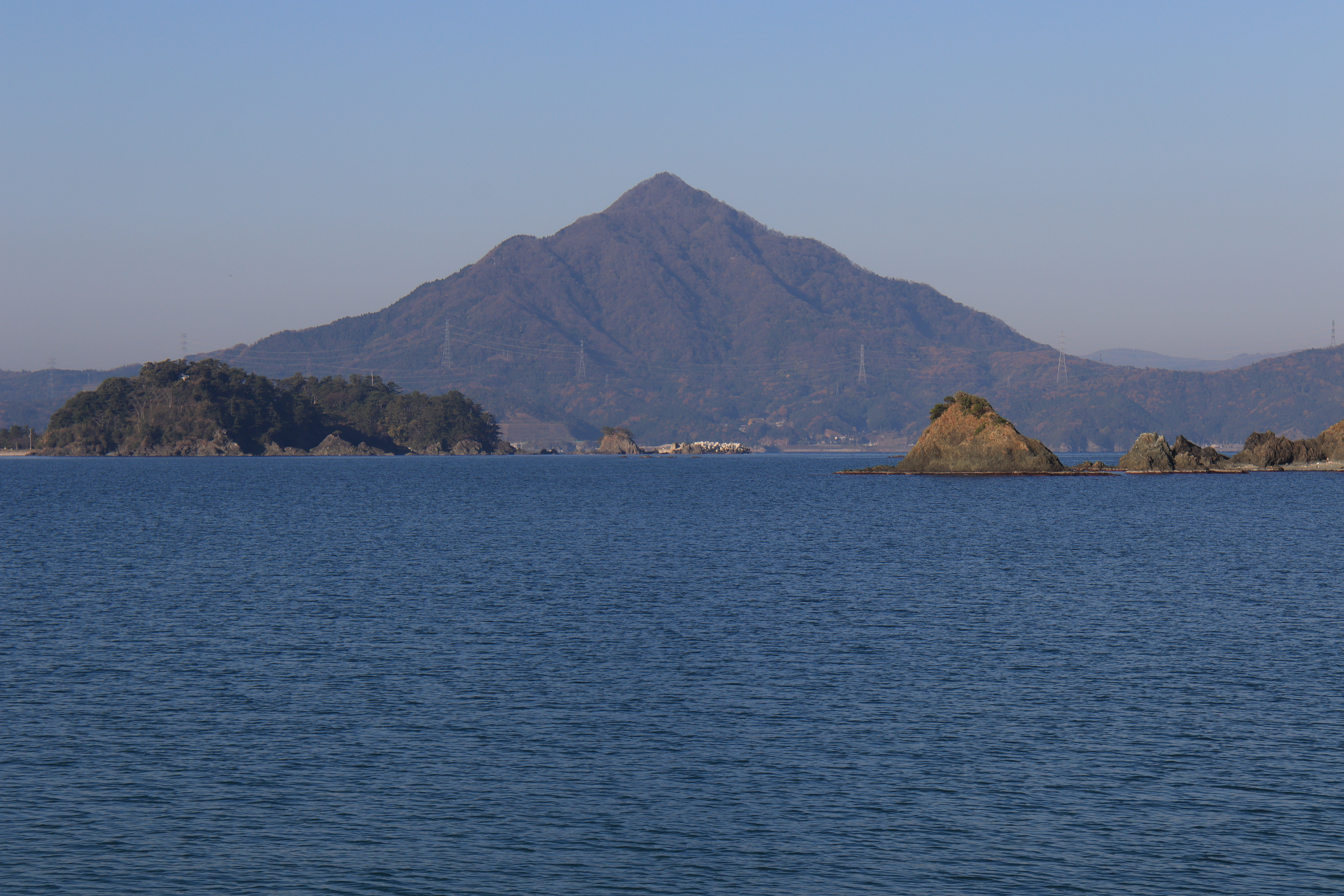

Highest point
- Coordinates: 35°30′19″N 135°29′02″E

Geography

Mount Aoba is a mountain in Japan, located across the municipal divisions of the town of Takahama in Fukui Prefecture and the city of Maizuru in Kyoto Prefecture.
