= Japanese cruiser Kako =

Furutaka-class cruiser

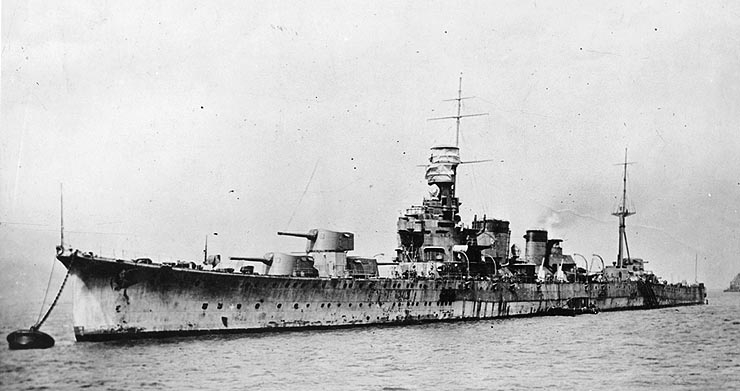
- Kako in 1926

History

Empire of Japan
- Name: Kako
- Namesake: Kako River
- Ordered: 1923 Fiscal Year
- Builder: Kawasaki Shipyards
- Laid down: 17 November 1922
- Launched: 10 April 1925
- Commissioned: 20 July 1926
- Stricken: 15 September 1942
- Fate: Sunk 10 August 1942

General characteristics
- Class & type: Furutaka-class heavy cruiser
- Displacement: 7,100 t (7,000 long tons) (standard)
- Length: 185.1 m (607 ft 3.4 in) (o/a)
- Beam: 16.55 m (54 ft 3.6 in)
- Draught: 5.56 m (18 ft 2.9 in)
- Installed power: 12 Kampon boilers; 102,000 shp (76,000 kW)
- Propulsion: 4 shafts; 4 geared steam turbines
- Speed: 34.5 knots (63.9 km/h; 39.7 mph)
- Range: 6,000 nmi (11,000 km; 6,900 mi) at 14 knots (26 km/h; 16 mph)
- Complement: 625
- Armament: (initial); 6 × single 20 cm (7.9 in) guns; 4 × single 76.2 mm (3 in) AA guns; 6 × twin 61 cm (24 in) torpedo tubes; (final); 3 × twin 20.3 cm (8 in) guns; 4 × single 12 cm (4.7 in) AA guns; 4 × twin 25 mm (1 in) AA guns; 2 × quad 61 cm (24 in) torpedo tubes
- Armor: Belt 76 mm (3.0 in); Deck 36 mm (1.4 in)
- Aircraft carried: 1–2 × floatplanes
- Aviation facilities: 1 catapult

Kako (Japanese: 加古; named after Kako River) was the second vessel in the two-vessel Furutaka class of heavy cruisers in the Imperial Japanese Navy.

== Background ==
Kako and her sister ship Furutaka were the first generation of high-speed heavy cruisers in the Japanese navy, intended to counter the US Navy Omaha-class scout cruisers and Royal Navy Hawkins-class heavy cruisers.

== Service career ==
=== Early career ===
Kako was completed at Kawasaki Shipbuilding Corporation at Kobe on 20 July 1926. Following the Japanese ship-naming conventions, the ship was named after the Kako River in Hyōgo Prefecture, Japan. Assigned to the Fifth Squadron (Sentai) from then until 1933, she served in Japanese and Chinese waters, participating in fleet maneuvers and combat operations off the China coast. Kako was given a major refit in 1929–30, improving her machinery and slightly changing her appearance. Briefly operating with Cruiser Division 6 in 1933, Kako was in the naval review off Yokohama in late August. She went into guard ship status in November of that year and into reserve in 1934.

In July 1936, Kako began an extensive reconstruction at Sasebo Navy Yard, which was completed by 27 December 1937. At this time, the ship's six single 7.87 in (200 mm) Mark I main battery was replaced by three twin-turrets housing the 8 in (203 mm)/50-cal Mark I guns from Haguro and Ashigara re-bored to Mark II (as there was a shortage of Mark II guns at this time).

In late 1941, Kako was in Cruiser Division 6 under Rear Admiral Aritomo Goto in the First Fleet with Aoba, Furutaka and Kinugasa. At the time of the attack on Pearl Harbor, she was engaged in support for the invasion of Guam.

After the failed first invasion of Wake Cruiser Division 6 was assigned to the larger second invasion force, and after the fall of Wake, returned to its forward base in Truk, Caroline Islands.

From 18 January 1942, Cruiser Division 6 was assigned to support Japanese troop landings at Rabaul, New Britain and Kavieng, New Ireland and in patrols around the Marshall Islands in unsuccessful pursuit of the American fleet. In March and April 1942, Cruiser Division 6 provided support to Cruiser Division 18 in covering the landings of Japanese troops in the Solomon Islands and New Guinea at Buka, Shortland, Kieta, Manus Island, Admiralty Islands and Tulagi from a forward base at Rabaul. While at Shortland on 6 May 1942, Kako was unsuccessfully attacked by four United States Army Air Forces Boeing B-17 Flying Fortresses, but was not damaged.

=== Battle of the Coral Sea ===
At the Battle of the Coral Sea, Cruiser Division 6 departed Shortland and effected a rendezvous at sea with light aircraft carrier Shōhō. At 1100 on 7 May 1942, north of Tulagi, Shōhō was attacked and sunk by 93 Douglas SBD Dauntless dive-bombers and Douglas TBD Devastator torpedo-bombers from the aircraft carriers USS Yorktown and Lexington.

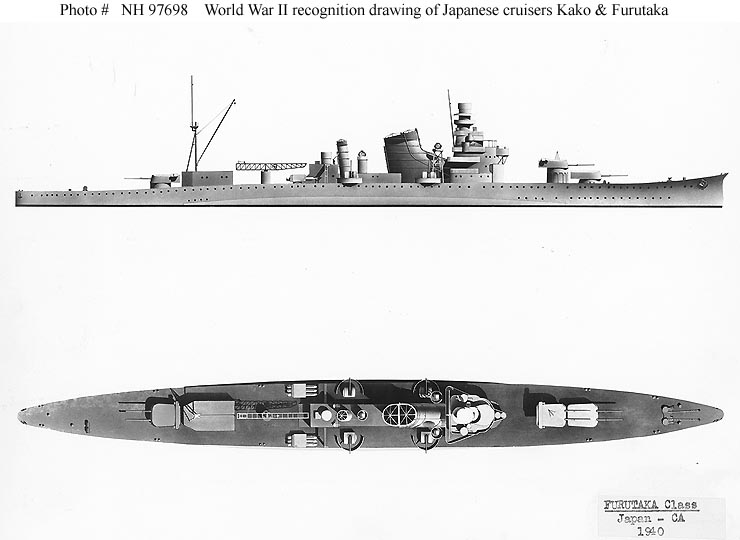
World War II recognition drawing of sister ship Furutaka

The following day, 8 May 1942 46 SBD Dautlesses, 21 TBD Devastators and 15 Grumman F4F Wildcats from Yorktown and Lexington damaged the aircraft carrier Shōkaku severely above the waterline and forced her retirement. As Furutaka and Kinugasa, undamaged in the battle, escorted Shōkaku back to Truk, Kako and Aoba continued to cover the withdrawing Port Moresby invasion convoy.

After refueling at Shortland on 9 May, Kako was stranded on a reef entering Queen Carola Harbor, but was soon re-floated.

Kako returned to Kure Naval Arsenal on 22 May 1942 for repairs, and returned to Truk on 23 June and from Truk to Rekata Bay, Santa Isabel Island, where she was assigned patrols through July.

In a major reorganization of the Japanese navy on 14 July 1942, Kako was assigned to the newly created Eighth Fleet under Vice Admiral Mikawa Gunichi and was assigned to patrols around the Solomon Islands, New Britain and New Ireland.

=== Battle of Savo Island ===
On 8 August 1942, north of Guadalcanal a three-seat Aichi E13A1 "Jake" reconnaissance floatplane launched from Kako was shot down by an SBD Dauntless of VS-72 from the aircraft carrier USS Wasp. This was the prelude to the Battle of Savo Island the following day.

On 9 August, the four heavy cruisers of Cruiser Division 6 (Aoba, Kako, Furutaka and Kinugasa), the heavy cruiser Chōkai, light cruisers Tenryū and Yūbari and destroyer Yūnagi engaged the Allied forces in a night gun and torpedo action. At about 2300, Chōkai, Furutaka and Kako all launched their reconnaissance floatplanes. The circling floatplanes dropped flares illuminating the targets and all the Japanese ships opened fire. The cruisers USS Astoria, Quincy, Vincennes and HMAS Canberra were sunk. The cruiser USS Chicago was damaged as were the destroyers Ralph Talbot and Patterson. Kako's gunfire hit Vincennes in the hangar and destroyed all of her Curtiss SOC Seagull floatplanes. On the Japanese side, Chōkai was hit three times, Kinugasa twice, Aoba once; Furutaka and Kako were not damaged.

On 10 August, Cruiser Division 6's four cruisers were ordered unescorted to Kavieng, while the remainder of the striking force returned to Rabaul. At 0650 the American submarine USS S-44 sighted Cruiser Division 6 on a track less than 900 yards (800 m) away and fired four Mark 10 torpedoes from 700 yards (600 m) at the rear ship in the group, which happened to be Kako. At 0708, three torpedoes hit Kako. The first struck to starboard abreast the No. 1 turret. The other torpedoes hit further aft, in the vicinity of the forward magazines and boiler rooms 1 and 2. Kako had all of her portholes open, and within 5 minutes she rolled over on her starboard side and exploded as sea water reached her boilers. At 0715, Kako disappeared bow first in the sea off Simbari Island at 02°28′S 152°11′E in about 130 feet (40 m) of water. Aoba, Furutaka and Kinugasa rescued Captain Takahashi and 649 crew, but 68 crewmen were killed.

Kako was removed from the navy list on 15 September 1942.

== Sources ==
- Brown, David (1990). Warship Losses of World War Two. Naval Institute Press. ISBN 1-55750-914-X.
- Dull, Paul S. (1978). A Battle History of the Imperial Japanese Navy, 1941–1945. Naval Institute Press. ISBN 0-87021-097-1.
- Jentschura, Hansgeorg; Jung, Dieter & Mickel, Peter (1977). Warships of the Imperial Japanese Navy, 1869–1945. Annapolis, Maryland: United States Naval Institute. ISBN 978-0-87021-893-4.
- Lacroix, Eric & Wells II, Linton (1997). Japanese Cruisers of the Pacific War. Annapolis, Maryland: Naval Institute Press. ISBN 0-87021-311-3.
- Whitley, M. J. (1995). Cruisers of World War Two: An International Encyclopedia. Annapolis, Maryland: Naval Institute Press. ISBN 1-55750-141-6.
