= Takao-class cruiser =

Class of heavy cruisers in the Imperial Japanese Navy

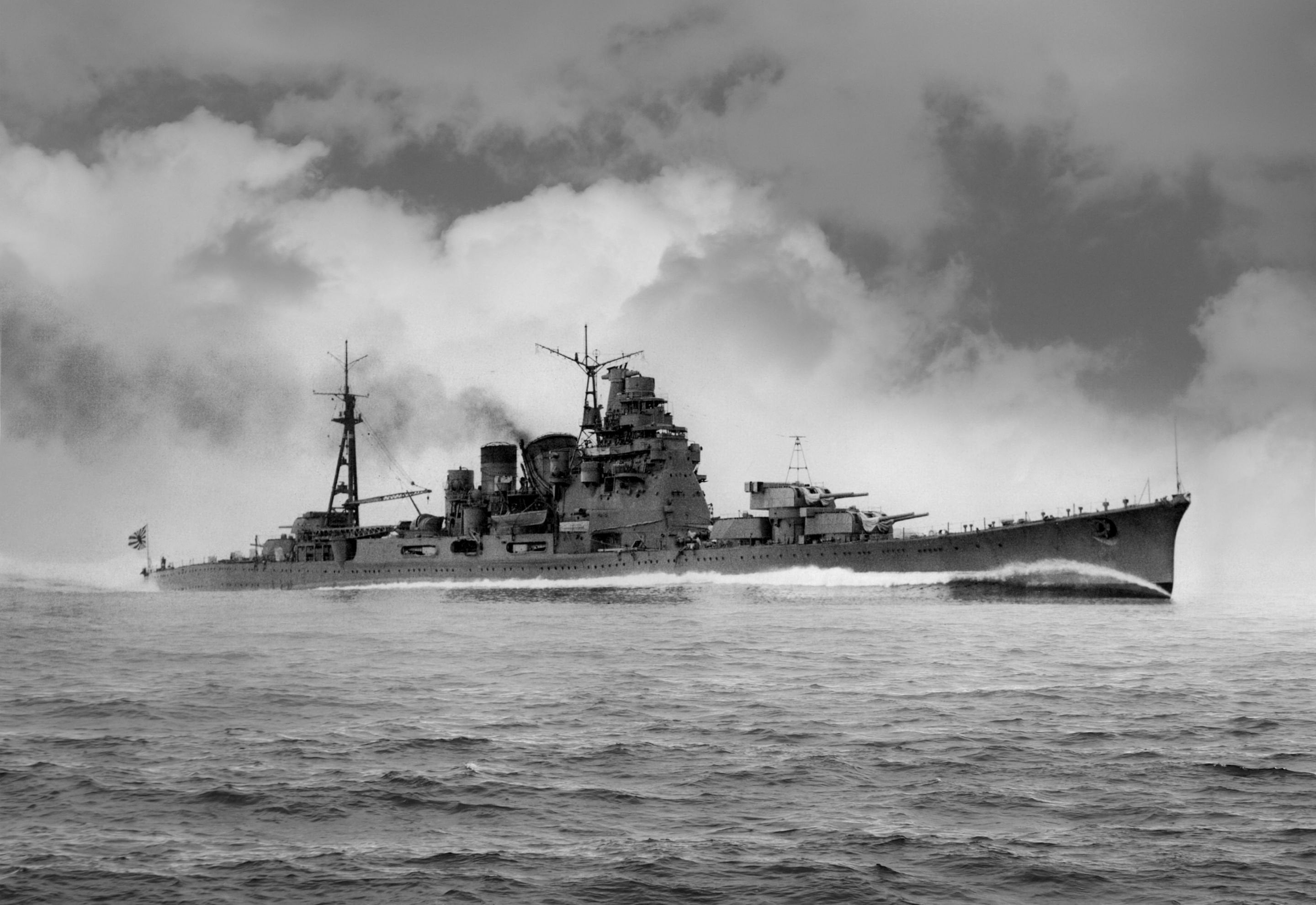
- The cruiser Takao in 1939

Class overview
- Name: Takao class
- Builders: Yokosuka Naval Arsenal; Kure Naval Arsenal; Kawasaki Dockyard, Kobe; Mitsubishi Shipbuilding, Nagasaki
- Operators: Imperial Japanese Navy
- Preceded by: Myōkō class
- Succeeded by: Mogami class
- Completed: 4
- Lost: 3

General characteristics
- Type: Heavy cruiser
- Displacement: 11,350 long tons (11,532 t) (Standard as built); 15,490 t (15,250 long tons) (full load)
- Length: 192.5 m (632 ft) p/p; 203.76 m (668.5 ft) overall
- Beam: 19 m (62 ft); 20.4 m (67 ft)
- Draft: 6.11 m (20.0 ft); 6.32 m (20.7 ft)
- Propulsion: 4 shaft geared turbine; 12 Kampon boilers; 132,000 shp (98,000 kW)
- Speed: 34.2–35.5 knots (63.3–65.7 km/h; 39.4–40.9 mph)
- Range: 8,500 nautical miles (15,700 km; 9,800 mi) at 14 knots (26 km/h; 16 mph)
- Complement: 773
- Armament: Original layout: 10 × 20 cm/50 3rd Year Type No.2 naval guns (5x2); 4 × Type 10 12 cm high angle guns (4x1); 8 × 61 cm torpedo tubes (4×2, 24 Type 90 torpedoes); 2 × 40 mm (1.6 in) AA guns (2x1); 2 x 7.7 mm Type 92 MG (2x1); Final layout (Takao and Atago): 10 × 20 cm/50 3rd Year Type No.2 naval guns (5x2); 8 × Type 89 12.7 cm (5 in) dual purpose guns (4x2); 60 × Type 96 25 mm (1.0 in) AA guns (30x1, 6x2, 6x3); 16 torpedo tubes (4×4, plus 8 reloads; 24 Type 93 torpedoes); Depth charges; Final layout (Maya): 8 × 20 cm/50 3rd Year Type No.2 naval guns (4x2); 12 × Type 89 12.7 cm (5 in) dual purpose guns, (6x2); 66 × Type 96 25 mm (1.0 in) AA guns (13x3, 27x1); 36 × Type 93 13.2 mm (0.5 in) AA machine guns; 16 torpedo tubes (4×4, with no reloads); Depth charges
- Armor: Machinery belts: 102mm; Magazine belts: 127 mm tapered to 38mm; Main deck: 37 mm (max); Upper deck: 12.7 to 25 mm; Bulkheads: 76 to 100 mm; Turrets: 25 mm
- Aircraft carried: One Aichi E13A1 "Jake" seaplane; Two F1M2 "Pete" seaplanes
- Aviation facilities: 2 catapults

The Takao-class cruiser (高雄型) was a class of four heavy cruisers of the Imperial Japanese Navy (IJN) launched between May 1930 and April 1931. All served during World War II.

== Description ==
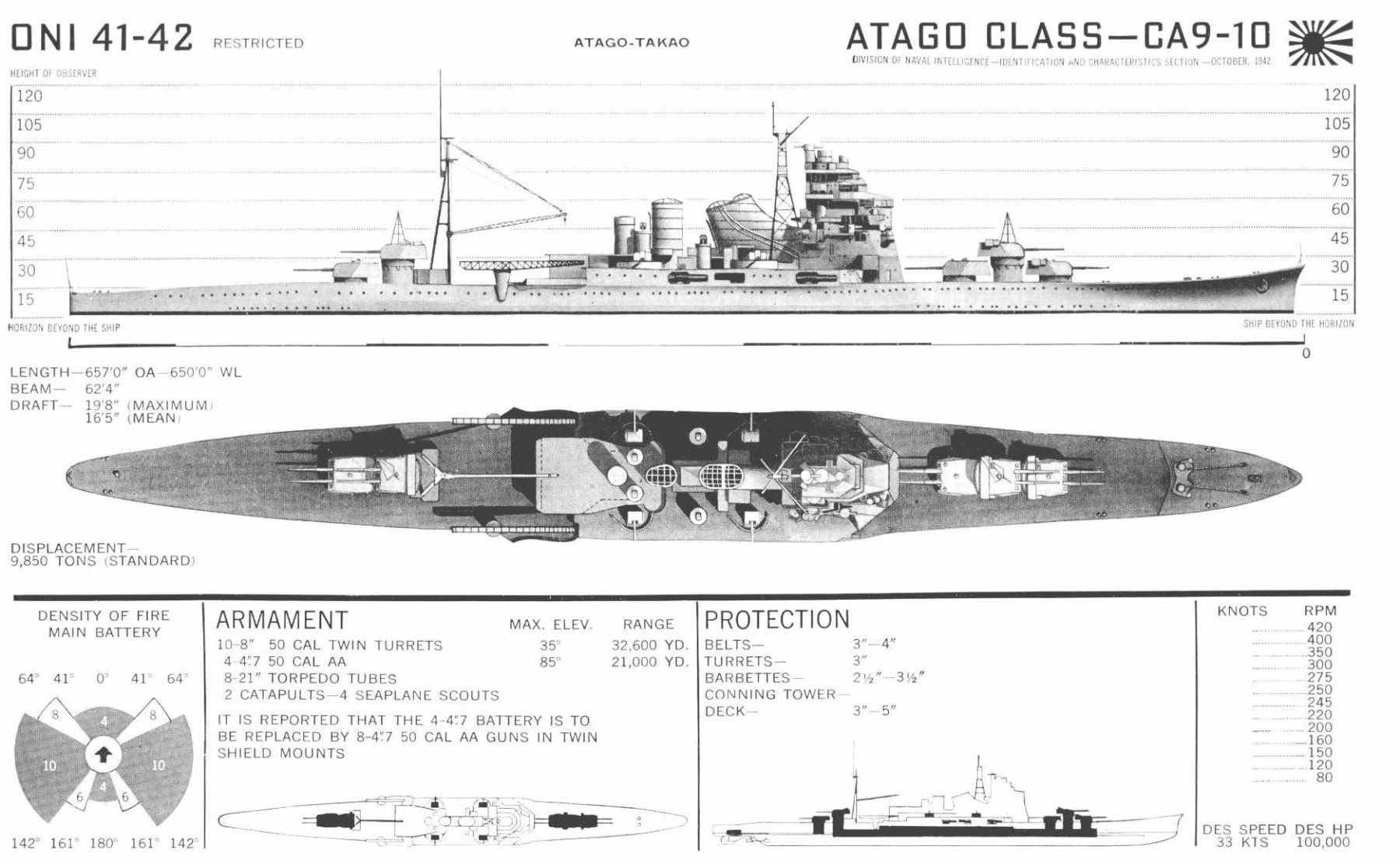
United States Navy recognition drawings of Takao and Atago

The Takao class was an evolution from the preceding Myōkō class, with heavier torpedo armament and a large, almost battleship-like bridge structure.

Like the Myōkō class, the ships were ostensibly intended to remain within the strictures of the Washington Naval Treaty, initially designed to weigh 9,850 long tons (10,008 t). However, like the Myōkōs, the Takaos ended up overweight, at 11,350 long tons (11,532 t). This markedly reduced their freeboard and stability. The large tower bridge added to the instability, but the cause of much of the excess weight remains unclear, as many components were heavier than expected.

Their main battery was ten 20.3 cm (8 in) guns in five twin mounts. For the first time the Mark 2 version of the gun was used during construction; all previous heavy cruisers received it during upgrades. Three of the turrets were located before the bridge in a pyramidal distribution, with the other two aft of the main mast and aircraft handling facilities. After investigation of the recent County-class cruisers of the United Kingdom, it was decided to give the main battery some anti-aircraft ability. The turrets were equipped with increased elevation limits versus their predecessors, 70 degrees in the Takao, Atago, and Chōkai, and 55 degrees in the Maya. The gun elevation gear was improved to achieve a maximum rate of twelve degrees per second. Additional shell lifts were installed to ease supply of AA shells to the main guns. However, it was later realized that these arrangements were inadequate. The elevating gear was considered impractical and delicate (later Japanese heavy cruisers used a reduced 55 degree limit on their guns). Although the elevation rate was better, reloading could be performed only at a fixed five degrees of elevation, which reduced rate of fire at higher angles. The rate of train was still only four degrees per second. Switching of anti-aircraft fire control was found inadequate for the main guns. Finally, the turret machinery was found to be too noisy.

They were also armed with eight 24 in (61 cm) torpedo tubes arranged in four Type 89 twin mounts. A rapid-reload installation was provided, with four twin racks, one per launcher mount. There were sixteen reload torpedoes held in reserve, for a total of twenty-four. After refit in 1938-1939, Takao and Atago were fitted with sixteen 24 in (61 cm) torpedo tubes in Type 92 quadruple mounts. Two quadruple rapid-reload racks were fitted, one each to port and starboard. Arrangements were made to carry Type 93 torpedoes, which were equipped in 1940. Chōkai and Maya did not receive these more extensive modifications, but were refitted with the Type 93 torpedo and oxygen equipment in 1941. Maya was refitted 1943-1944 with sixteen 610mm torpedo tubes in four Type 92 quad mounts, but there were no reloads or rapid-reload racks.

The ships were initially equipped with four single Type 10 12 cm/45 "high-angle" anti-aircraft guns. These cannons were replaced in 1942 on the Takao and Atago with eight Type 89 12.7 cm/40 guns in four twin mounts. They were replaced on Maya with twelve Type 89 12.7 cm/40 guns in six twin mounts during a 1943-1944 refit. Chōkai retained the four Type 10s until it was sunk.

Light anti-aircraft armament comprised two "HI" Type 40mm/62 guns and two "HI" Type 7.7mm machine guns. Both designs were Vickers imports. These guns were progressively replaced and supplemented with Type 93 13mm guns and Type 96 25mm guns during refits.

Takao class midship with armour thickness in millimetres

== History ==
The class would see heavy service throughout the Pacific war. Mere days after the Pearl Harbor attack, Chōkai would serve with the naval task force that trailed the battleship HMS Prince of Wales and the battlecruiser HMS Repulse for a potential surface action, but she did not manage to engage the pair before they were sunk by land-based torpedo bombers. From then on out, the class would see a service from the rest of December to January of 1942 escorting invasion convoys before taking part in vigorous shore bombardment duties to support said convoys.

=== Indian Ocean campaign ===
Eventually, the Takao class would see more active service hunting down and sinking small warships and other vessels in the Indian Ocean. On March 1st, Takao overpowered and sank the British minesweeper Scott Harley and the Dutch freighter Toradja, and captured the Dutch freighter Bintoehan. Later that night, Takao and Atago joined each other and combined fire to sink the destroyer USS Pillsbury with all hands. On March 2nd, Maya assisted in sinking the destroyer/minelayer HMS Stronghold, then the next day Maya was present during the sinking of the gunboat USS Asheville, but did not actually engage with the sinking being carried out by her consorts, the destroyers Nowaki and Arashi. Then on March 4, Takao, Atago, and Maya attacked a convoy heading to Australia, sinking the sloop HMAS Yarra, a minesweeper, a depot ship, and an oil tanker, before Atago captured two freighters. Finally, Chōkai saw action where she sank the US freighter Bienville on April 1st, then sank the British steamship Ganges on April 6th.

All four ships were involved in the Battle of Midway although none saw combat, with Atago and Chōkai in Kondō's Midway invasion Force as Cruiser Division (Sentai) 4, Section 1. Takao and Maya, as Cruiser Division 4, Section 2, were a part of the Aleutian Islands campaign as escorts for the Second Carrier Striking Force.

=== Guadalcanal campaign ===
Following Midway, the ships were sent to assist in the Guadalcanal campaign. On August 9, Chōkai served as Admiral Mikawa's flagship during the action that would become known as the battle of Savo Island, one of the most devastating Japanese navy victories of the war, sinking four allied heavy cruisers and damaging several other ships. For her part, Chōkai directly sank the heavy cruiser USS Vincennes with two torpedo hits, and via gunfire assisted in sinking the heavy cruisers HMAS Canberra and USS Astoria, while her consorts sank the heavy cruiser USS Quincy. In exchange, Chōkai was moderately damaged by three 8-inch (203 mm) shell hits from Astoria and Quincy, one knocked out her A turret, and another exploded in her chart room, injuring Mikawa. While Chōkai was in repairs, the rest of the class escorted carriers during the battles of the Eastern Solomons and Santa Cruz. On the night of November 15, Takao and Atago would see major action during the second naval battle of Guadalcanal. Together, they shelled the crippled battleship USS South Dakota, landing between 16-19 hits, before attacks by the battleship USS Washington sank the battleship Kirishima and disrupted the rest of the force, during which Atago was lightly damaged by a single 5-inch (127 mm) shell hit from Washington's secondary battery.

=== Solomon Islands campaign ===
In 1943, the four ships spent some time in Japan, then deployed to Truk and New Britain. On March 27 Maya got her big action fighting a US cruiser task force at the battle of the Komandorski Islands. Maya engaged in a gunnery duel with the heavy cruiser USS Salt Lake City, and was lightly damaged by a few straddles and near misses. However, in exchange she hit Salt Lake City with up to seven 20.3 cm (8 in) shell hits, leaving her dead in the water with a rudder jam and suffering heavy flooding. On November 5th 1943, while anchored in Rabaul harbor, Takao, Atago and Maya were damaged by American aircraft from Rear-Admiral Sherman's Task Force (TF) 38, comprising the carriers USS Saratoga and USS Princeton, escorted by two anti-aircraft cruisers and nine destroyers. A follow-up attack on 11 November by TF 38 and additional U.S. carriers damaged more Japanese ships, and all three ships had to return to Japan for repairs. During these repairs, Maya was modified to become an anti-aircraft cruiser.

=== Battle of Leyte Gulf ===
In 1944, all four ships took part in the Battle of the Philippine Sea, where Cruiser Division 4 was part of C Force, composed of the two super battleships Yamato and Musashi, two fast battleships Kongō and Haruna, three light carriers, eight heavy cruisers (including the four Takaos), one light cruiser and seven destroyers. The four Takao-class ships were assigned to Vice Admiral Kurita's Center Force for the Battle of Leyte Gulf, or Operation Sho-1 as it was known to the Japanese. The ships left Brunei on 22 October 1944 for what would be their last battle. On 23 October 1944, while passing through the Palawan Passage, the force was attacked by the submarines USS Darter and USS Dace. Darter attacked both Takao and Atago, hitting the former with two and the latter with four torpedoes. Atago was mortally damaged and sank rapidly, although Admiral Kurita survived the sinking. Takao was severely damaged and was escorted to Singapore by two destroyers, but after her arrival would never sail again. Dace sank Maya with a salvo of four torpedoes.

Chōkai, the last remaining ship of Cruiser Division 4, continued with the main force, pulling through the Battle of the Sibuyan Sea unscathed, before engaging in the later action off Samar. Chōkai would engage the American escort carriers, destroyers, and destroyer escorts of Taffy 3. During the action, she was engaged by the destroyer escort USS Samuel B Roberts, and was badly damaged by a torpedo hit to her stern. However, this did not put her out of action, as she continued to engage the force, firing on the escort carrier USS White Plains and scoring hits, but in turn the flat top hit Chōkai with some five 5-inch (127 mm) shells. However, fatal damage occurred when air attacks from USS Kitkun Bay dropped a bomb down the stack, destroying her engine room. After her crew was removed, the destroyer Fujinami scuttled Chōkai with torpedo hits. Several days later, Fujinami herself was sunk by American carrier aircraft with all hands, including the Chōkai survivors.

There is some debate as to how Chōkai sank. American accounts of the battle often talk about how a shell from White Plains hit the torpedo tubes and detonated them, which was what caused the fatal damage. However, Japanese records do not support this, and firmly state she was sunk by aerial bombs. The question was resolved in 2019 when Chōkai's wreck was found, and a survey shortly afterwards found the torpedo tubes to be completely intact.

The unrepaired Takao would sit in Singapore until the end of the war. With the formal surrender of the Japanese to allied forces, both Takao and the damaged heavy cruiser Myōkō were taken over by British forces. On October 29th 1946, Takao was finally expended and sunk as target practice by the light cruiser HMS Newfoundland in the Malacca Strait.

== Ships ==
Four ships of the class were launched. All served in World War II and all were sunk or disabled by the end of the war.

Construction data
Name	Kanji	Builder	Laid	Launched	Commissioned	Fate
Takao	高雄	Yokosuka Naval Arsenal	28 Apr 1927	12 May 1930	31 May 1932	Damaged 23 October 1944 in the Palawan Passage by the submarine USS Darter. Captured 21 September 1945 at Singapore. Sunk 29 October 1946 in the Strait of Malacca as a target ship by the light cruiser HMS Newfoundland.
Atago	愛宕	Kure Naval Arsenal	28 Apr 1927	16 June 1930	30 Mar 1932	Sunk 23 October 1944 in the Palawan Passage by the submarine USS Darter.
Maya	摩耶	Kawasaki Dockyard Company, Kobe Shipyard	4 Dec 1928	8 Nov 1930	20 June 1932	Sunk 23 October 1944 in the Palawan Passage by the submarine USS Dace.
Chōkai	鳥海	Mitsubishi Shipbuilding and Engineering Company, Nagasaki Shipyard	26 Mar 1928	5 Apr 1931	30 June 1932	Disabled 25 October 1944 at the Battle off Samar by naval gunfire and air attack; scuttled by the destroyer Fujinami.

== See also ==
- Muroc Maru - A bombing practice target resembling a Takao-class cruiser

== Books ==
- D'Albas, Andrieu (1965). Death of a Navy: Japanese Naval Action in World War II. Devin-Adair Pub.
- Dull, Paul S. (1978). A Battle History of the Imperial Japanese Navy, 1941-1945. Naval Institute Press.
- Lacroix, Eric; Linton Wells (1997). Japanese Cruisers of the Pacific War. Naval Institute Press.
