= Furutaka-class cruiser =

Cruiser class of the Imperial Japanese Navy

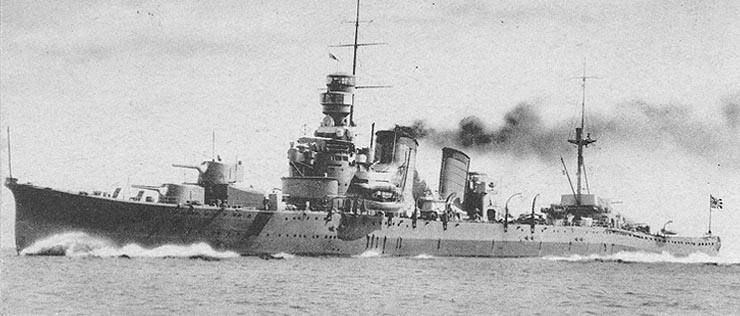
- Furutaka, early 1930s

Class overview
- Name: Furutaka class
- Builders: Mitsubishi Shipbuilding & Eng., Nagasaki; Kawasaki Dockyard Co., Kobe
- Operators: Imperial Japanese Navy
- Preceded by: none
- Succeeded by: Aoba class
- In commission: 1925–1942
- Completed: 2
- Lost: 2

General characteristics
- Type: Heavy cruiser
- Displacement: 7,100 tons (standard); 9,540 tons (full load)
- Length: 185.1 m (607 ft 3.4 in) (o/a)
- Beam: 16.55 m (54 ft 3.6 in)
- Draught: 5.56 m (18 ft 2.9 in)
- Installed power: 12 Kampon boilers; 102,000 shp (76,000 kW)
- Propulsion: 4 shafts; 4 geared steam turbines
- Speed: 34.5 knots (63.9 km/h; 39.7 mph)
- Range: 6,000 nmi (11,000 km; 6,900 mi) at 14 knots (26 km/h; 16 mph)
- Complement: 625
- Armament: (initial); 6 × single 20 cm (7.9 in) guns; 4 × single 76.2 mm (3 in) AA guns; 6 × twin 61 cm (24 in) torpedo tubes; (final); 3 × twin 20.3 cm (8 in) guns; 4 × single 12 cm (4.7 in) AA guns; 4 × twin 25 mm (1.0 in) AA guns; 2 × quad 61 cm (24 in) torpedo tubes
- Armor: Belt: 76 mm (3 in); Magazine: 51 mm (2 in); Turrets: 25.4 mm (1 in); Conning tower: none; Decks: 35 mm (1.4 in); Upper Decks: 48 mm (1.9 in)
- Aircraft carried: 1 or 2 seaplanes
- Aviation facilities: 1 catapult

The Furutaka-class cruisers (古鷹型巡洋艦, Furutaka-gata jun'yōkan) were a class of two heavy cruisers which saw service with the Imperial Japanese Navy during World War II. Both vessels of this class were sunk in 1942 during the Guadalcanal campaign.

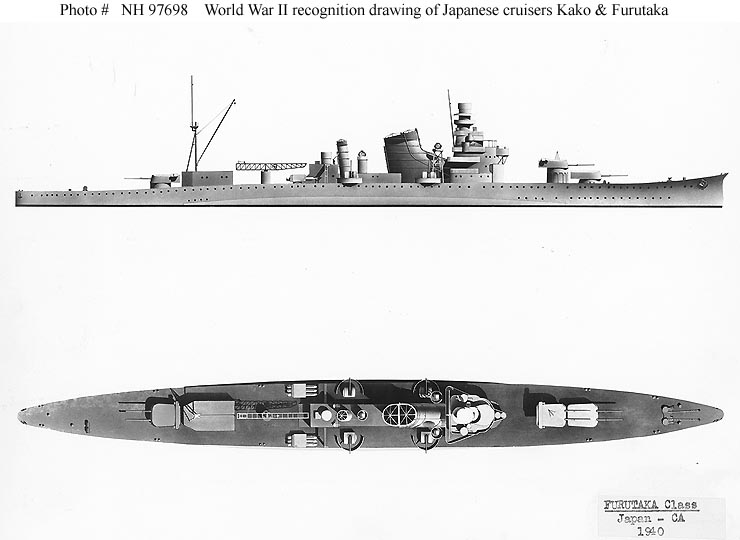
US Navy recognition diagrams, World War II

== Design ==
The Furutaka-class cruisers were the first heavy cruisers in the Imperial Japanese Navy (IJN), also referred to as "A class" cruisers by the IJN. Like the cruiser Yūbari, their design was the work of Constructor Captain Yuzuru Hiraga, assisted by Lt. Cmdr. Kikuo Fujimoto.

Designed to beat the U.S. Omaha class and the British Hawkins-class cruisers, they were as fast as the Omahas (and nearly 4 knots faster than the Hawkins class), while firing a heavier broadside, and carrying a larger torpedo battery than either one.

Their flush deck resulted in both weight savings and increased strength by allowing the hull's longitudinal members to be continuous. As with Yūbari, the design featured side and deck armour integrated into the ship's structure, saving additional weight.

Despite the weight-saving efforts, as built Kako was more than 900 tons heavier than her design weight. As a result, draft was increased by more than 1 metre, subsequently reducing top speed, and the height of the belt armour above the waterline. The portholes of the lowest-level crew quarters were near enough to the waterline that they needed to be closed when the ships were at sea, reducing ventilation and making the living spaces less habitable.

They were the first of the IJN cruisers to feature a substantial bridge, with six distinct levels, providing support for navigation, fire control, communication and command.

Due to the high freeboard of these ships, mounting the torpedo tubes on the main deck would have caused the torpedoes to enter the water at too steep an angle. Instead, they were mounted on the middle deck in three pairs of fixed tubes on each side. Captain Hiraga argued against this kind of mounting, concerned that during battle either a direct hit or fires could detonate the torpedoes, causing severe damage, as indeed happened with Furutaka of this class during World War II; additionally, the cruisers Mikuma, Suzuya, and Mogami, all of which featured similar arrangements, would all be sunk or severely damaged by their own exploding torpedoes.

== Modernization ==
Japanese naval strategists since the early 20th century had planned for a defensive war in the Pacific, with the U.S. Navy as their main opponent. To take advantage of their superior long-range torpedoes, and offset the numerical superiority the U.S. Navy enjoyed, they extensively trained their crews in night torpedo tactics. In 1930, the Naval General Staff, further concerned by the limitations on the size of their navy by the London Naval Treaty won approval for an extensive modernization program of the "A class" cruisers. Planned upgrades to the ships included the latest weapons, protection, fire control systems, and communication equipment.

From 1931 to 1933 the two ships had their four original anti-aircraft guns replaced by improved 12 cm high-angle electro-hydraulically operated guns, with directors and range finders for them. The original airplane takeoff platform was replaced with a catapult for a reconnaissance seaplane.

They were substantially rebuilt in 1936-1937 (Kako) and 1937-1939 (Furutaka) as follows:

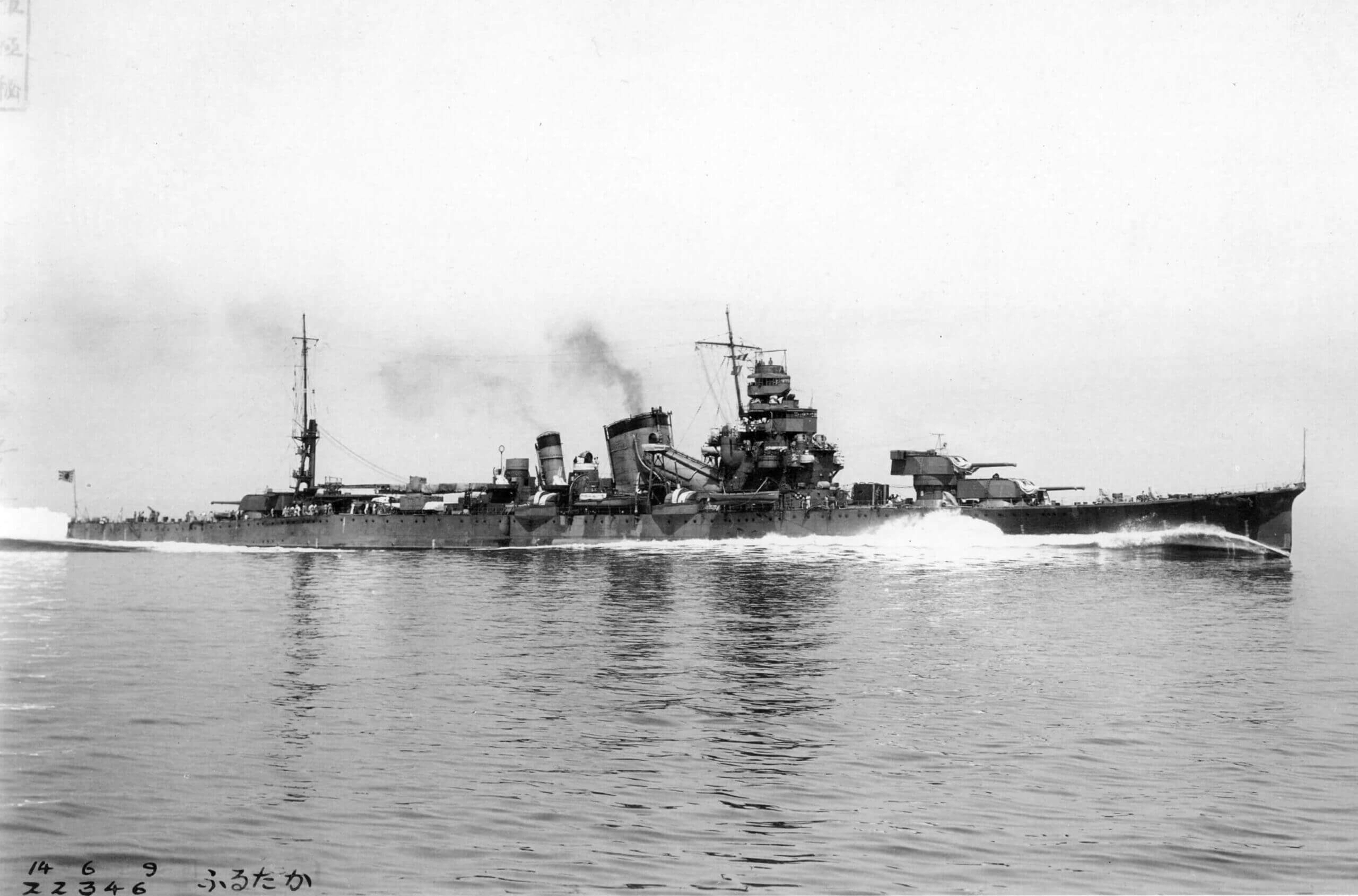
Furutaka after 1937-1939 modernization

The six single 7.87 in (200 mm) Mark I main battery was replaced by three twin-turrets housing the 8 in (203 mm)/50-cal Mark I guns from Haguro and Ashigara re-bored to Mark II (as there was a shortage of Mark II guns at this time). Light anti-aircraft protection was augmented with eight 25 mm automatic cannons in four twin mounts. The six pairs (three per side) of fixed torpedo tubes mounted on the middle deck were replaced with two quadruple mounts using the powerful Type 93 torpedo, located on the upper deck, one on each side of the catapult.

The bridge structure was completely rebuilt to accommodate the latest rangefinders and fire control equipment for the main battery, antiaircraft and torpedoes. Platforms were redesigned for aircraft spotters.

The twelve original mixed-fuel boilers were replaced by 10 large oil-fired units, along with a redesign of all the boiler rooms, and replacement of coal bunkers with fuel-oil tanks.

All of the new equipment resulted in increased electrical power requirements, so three more generators were added to increase power output from 315 kW to 885 kW.

These modifications added 560 tons to the ships. To prevent the draft from increasing even more, and to improve stability, bulges were added, simultaneously enhancing antitorpedo protection. As a result, the ships' beam was increased to 16.92 m (55.5 ft).

== Ships in class ==
Construction data
Name	Kanji	Builder	Laid down	Launched	Commissioned	Fate
Furutaka	古鷹	Mitsubishi Nagasaki Shipyard	5 December 1922	25 February 1925	31 March 1926	Sunk 11 October 1942, Battle of Cape Esperance
Kako	加古	Kōbe-Kawasaki Shipbuilding Yard	17 November 1922	4 April 1925	20 July 1926	Sunk 10 August 1942 by submarine USS S-44 after Battle of Savo Island

== Sources ==
- Lacroix, Eric & Wells II, Linton (1997). Japanese Cruisers of the Pacific War. Annapolis, Maryland: Naval Institute Press. ISBN 0-87021-311-3.
- Whitley, M. J. (1995). Cruisers of World War Two: An International Encyclopedia. Annapolis, Maryland: Naval Institute Press. ISBN 1-55750-141-6.
