= Type 93 torpedo =

WW2 24-inch torpedo of the Imperial Japanese Navy

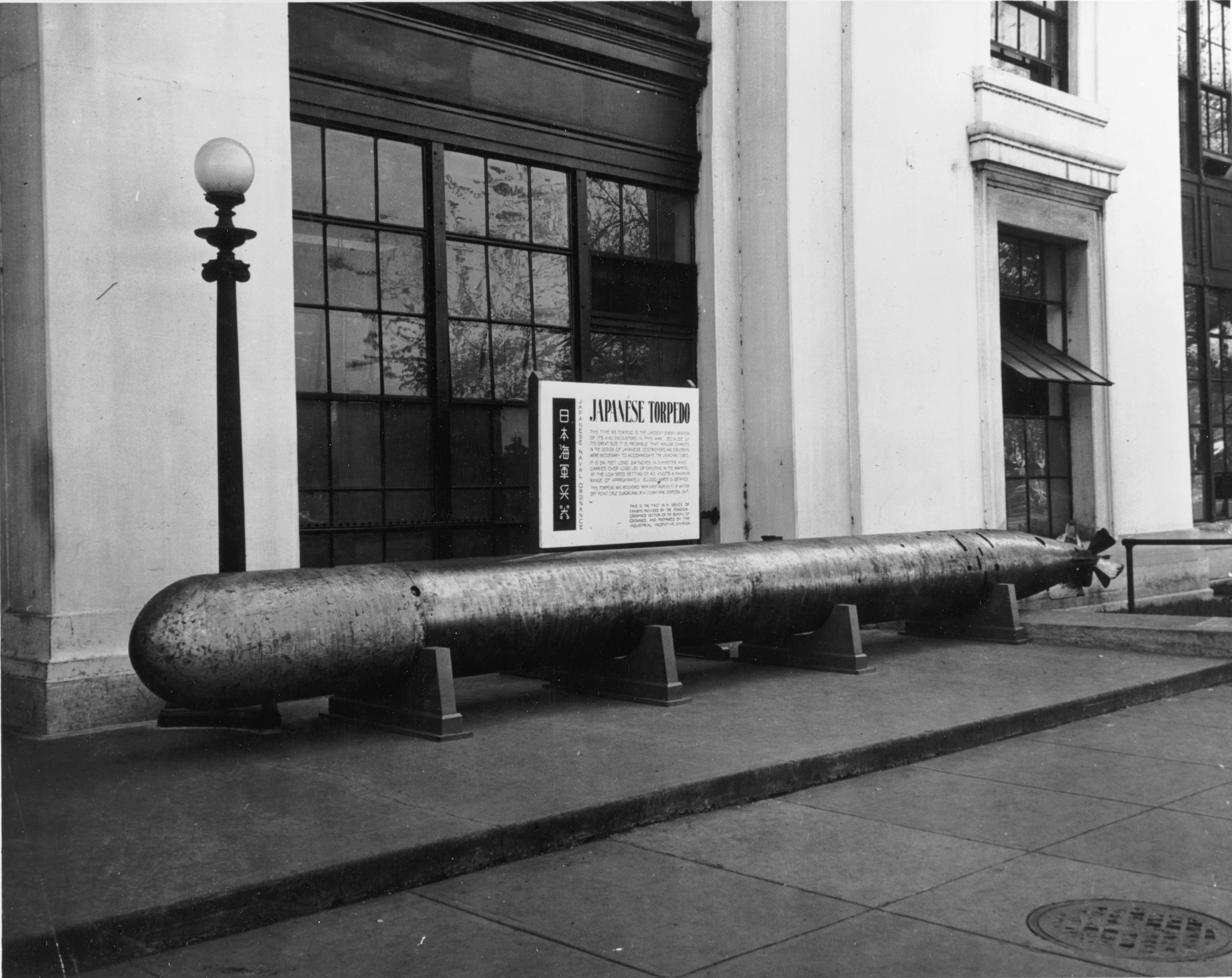
- Type 93 torpedo, recovered from Point Cruz, Guadalcanal, on display outside U.S. Navy headquarters in Washington, D.C., during World War II
- Type: Torpedo
- Place of origin: Empire of Japan

Service history
- In service: 1933–1945
- Used by: Imperial Japanese Navy
- Wars: Second World War

Production history
- Designer: Rear Admiral Kaneji Kishimoto and Captain Toshihide Asakuma
- Designed: 1928–1932
- Variants: Type 97 torpedo, Type 95 torpedo

Specifications
- Mass: 2.7 tonnes (6000 lb)
- Length: 9 metres (29 ft 6 5/16 in)
- Diameter: 610 mm (2 ft 1/64 in)
- Effective firing range: 22,000 m (24,000 yd) at 89–93 km/h (48–50 kn)
- Maximum firing range: 40,400 m (44,200 yd) at 63–67 km/h (34–36 kn)
- Warhead weight: 490 kg (1080 lb)
- Propellant: Kerosene or similar oxidized with oxygen-enriched air
- Maximum speed: 96 km/h (52 kn)
- Launch platform: Surface ships

The Type 93 (酸素魚雷; designated for Imperial Japanese calendar year 2593) was a 610 mm (24 in)-diameter torpedo of the Imperial Japanese Navy (IJN), launched from surface ships. It is commonly referred to as the Long Lance by most modern English-language naval historians, a nickname given to it after the war by Samuel Eliot Morison, the chief historian of the U.S. Navy, who spent much of the war in the Pacific Theater. In Japanese references, the term Sanso gyorai (酸素魚雷; lit. "oxygen torpedo") is also used, in reference to its propulsion system. It was the most advanced naval torpedo in the world at the time.

== History and development ==
The Type 93's development (in parallel with a submarine-launched model, the Type 95) began in Japan in 1928, under the auspices of Rear Admiral Kaneji Kishimoto and Captain Toshihide Asakuma, as an evolution of the 610 mm (24 in)-diameter Type 90 pneumatic torpedo. The torpedo design was inspired by the British oxygen-enriched torpedoes used on the Nelson-class battleships: a naval officer believed them to be oxygen-fuelled and it led to restarting research at Kure.

At the time, the most powerful potential enemy of the Japanese Navy was the United States Navy's Pacific Fleet. The US Navy's doctrine, presuming an invasion by Japan of the Philippines (an American commonwealth at that time), called for the battle line to fight its way across the Pacific Ocean, relieve or recapture the Philippines, and destroy the Japanese fleet. Since the IJN had fewer battleships than the US Navy, it planned to use light forces (light cruisers, destroyers, and submarines) to whittle down the US fleet in a succession of minor battles, mostly at night. After the number of American warships was sufficiently reduced, the IJN would commit its own presumably fresh and undamaged battleships to finish off the US remnants in one huge climactic battle. A climactic battle was essentially what the US Navy's "War Plan Orange" expected as well, but in that case they would be on the offensive side.

To aid with this strategy of whittling down the US forces using smaller units, the Japanese Navy invested heavily in developing a large, heavy, and long-range torpedo, the Type 93. Torpedoes were the only weapon that gave small warships, such as destroyers, the potential to cripple or sink battleships. The IJN's torpedo research and development focused on using highly compressed oxygen instead of compressed air as the fuel oxidizer in the torpedo's propulsion system. These torpedoes used an otherwise normal wet-heater engine burning a fuel such as kerosene. Since air is only 21% oxygen (and 78% nitrogen), pure oxygen provides nearly five times as much oxidizer in the same tank volume, thereby increasing torpedo range. In addition, the absence of the inert nitrogen contained in (compressed) air led to the emission of significantly less exhaust gas, made up only of water vapor and carbon dioxide which, being significantly soluble in water, greatly reduced tell-tale bubble trails.

Compressed oxygen is dangerous to handle and required lengthy research and development, not to mention additional training for the warship's torpedomen, for safe operational use. Eventually, the IJN's weapons development engineers found that by starting the torpedo's engine with compressed air, and then gradually switching to pure oxygen, they were able to overcome the problem of explosions that had hampered it before. To conceal the use of pure oxygen from the ship's crew and any potential enemy, the oxygen tank was named the secondary air tank. The pure oxygen torpedo was first deployed by the IJN in 1935.

== Specification ==
Some specification examples of ranges by speed:

- 22,000 m (24,000 yd) at 89 to 93 km/h (48 to 50 kn) (13.6 miles)
- 33,000 m (36,000 yd) at 69 to 72 km/h (37 to 39 kn) (20.5 miles)
- 40,400 m (44,200 yd) at 61 to 65 km/h (33 to 35 kn) (25.1 miles)

However, the IJN announced officially the maximum performance of the Type 93 was 11 km (12,000 yd) at 78 km/h (42 kn).

The stated range of over 10 km (11,000 yd) was effective when the targeted warship steamed straight for more than a few minutes while the torpedo approached. This sometimes occurred when USN cruisers chased IJN destroyers breaking away from the scene of the battle at high speed during the night, or when American fleet carriers, engaged in flight operations, were targeted by IJN submarines in the South Pacific in 1942–43.

The Type 93 weighed about 2,700 kg (6,000 lb), with a high explosive warhead of about 490 kg (1,080 lb) of Shimose type 97 explosive, which was about 7% more powerful than straight TNT.

Rear Admiral Jungo Rai explained this weapon in the chapter "Torpedo", in collective work The Full Particulars of Secret Weapons (秘密兵器の全貌), first published by Koyo-sha, Japan, in 1952.

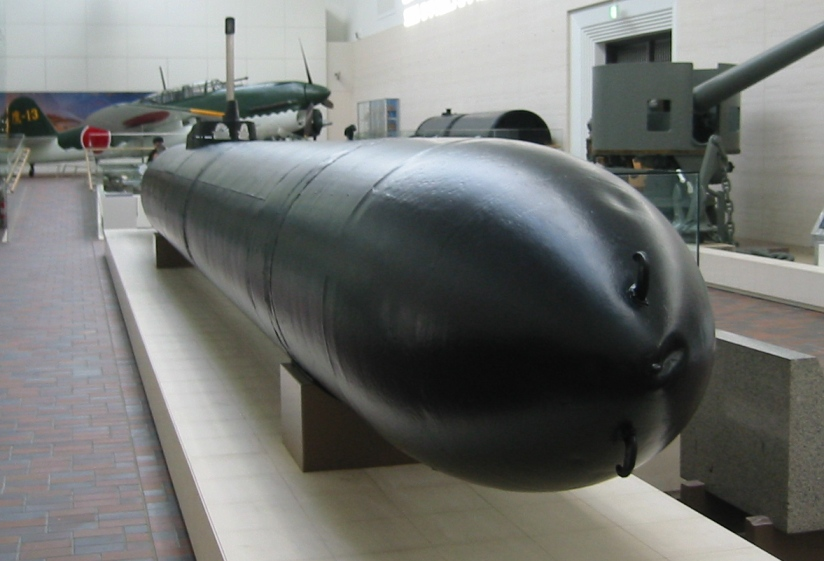
A Type 93 torpedo modified into a Kaiten, Yasukuni Shrine Yūshūkan War Memorial Museum

The Type 93 torpedo had a main chamber filled with pure compressed oxygen, a joint regulator valve preventing reverse flow, and a small (approximately 13-liter) high-pressure air tank. First, compressed air was mixed with fuel, and the mixture was supplied to a heat starter. Ignition started gently, with the mixture burning steadily in the engine (if oxygen was used at this stage, explosions were common). As the compressed air was consumed and lost pressure, high-pressure oxygen was supplied from the main chamber through the joint valve into the compressed air tank. Soon the air tank was filled with pure oxygen, and combustion continued in the engine.

The torpedo needed careful maintenance. Warships equipped with Type 93 torpedo launchers required an oxygen generator system to use this type of torpedo.

=== Development of Kaiten from the Type 93 ===
The rotational speed of the gyrocompass was increased to 20,000 rpm for the Kaiten manned torpedo. The warhead of the Type 93 torpedo was 480 kg (1,060 lb) (the same as the 1-ton 410 mm (16 in) gun of an Imperial Japanese battleship), increased to 1.6 tons for Kaiten.

The Type 93 torpedo is 9.61 m (31.5 ft) long and weighs about three tons, while the Kaiten was 15 m (49 ft) long and weighed eight tons. The maximum speed of the Type 93 was 96 km/h (52 kn), for a range of 22,000 m (24,000 yd). The Kaiten had a range of 23,000 m (25,000 yd) at 56 km/h (30 kn), and 70,000 m (77,000 yd) at 22 km/h (12 kn). The Kaiten had a stable slow cruising capability just beneath the surface.

== Operational history ==
The Type 93 had a maximum range of 40 km (44,000 yd) at 70 km/h (38 kn) with a 490 kg (1,080 lb) high explosive warhead. Its long range, high speed, and heavy warheads provided a formidable punch in surface battles. In contrast, the U.S. Navy's standard surface-launched torpedo of World War II, the 53 cm (21 in) Mark 15, had a maximum range of 14,000 m (15,000 yd) at 49.1 km/h (26.5 kn), or 5,500 m (6,000 yd) at 83 km/h (45 kn), with a significantly smaller 375 kg (827 lb) warhead; torpedoes of other Allied nations did not have longer range. The Type 93 was launched from 61 cm (24 in) torpedo tubes mounted on the decks of IJN destroyers and cruisers; some Japanese destroyers, unlike ships of other navies, mounted their banks of torpedo tubes in turrets offering protection against splinters, and had tube loaders. The IJN armed nearly all of its cruisers with Type 93 torpedoes.

The long range of the Type 93 enabled them to score the two longest-ranged torpedo hits ever fired. At the battle of the Java Sea, 27 February 1942, the heavy cruiser Haguro launched a spread of torpedoes from 22,000 yards which hit and sank the Dutch destroyer Kortenaer. Shortly before the battle of Kula Gulf, 5 July 1943, the destroyer Niizuki launched a torpedo that hit and sank the destroyer USS Strong between 19,000 to 22,000 yards.

In the early surface battles of 1942–43, Japanese destroyers and cruisers were able to launch their torpedoes from about 20 km (22,000 yd) at unsuspecting Allied warships attempting to close to gun range; the Allied warships expected that, if torpedoes were used, they would be fired from not more than 10 km (11,000 yd), their own typical torpedo range. The many torpedo hits suffered by Allied warships in such engagements led their officers to believe the torpedoes had been fired by undetected Japanese submarines operating in concert with the surface warships. On rare occasions, stray Type 93s also struck ships at much longer ranges than their intended targets, leading the Allies on occasion to suspect their ships had hit mines. The capabilities of the Type 93 went mostly unrecognized by the Allies until examples were captured intact in 1943.

A 45 cm (17.7 in) version, the Type 97, was later developed for midget submarines, but was not a success, and was replaced operationally by Japan's standard aerial torpedo, the Type 91. A 53 cm (21 in) version for use by a few IJN submarines was designated the Type 95, and it was ultimately successful.

A disadvantage of the Type 93 was that its Shimose explosive warhead was far more likely to detonate due to shock than a TNT-loaded torpedo. The explosion from one Type 93, with its heavy warhead, was usually enough to sink the destroyer, or heavily damage the cruiser, carrying it. As American air strikes against IJN ships became more common, captains of destroyers and cruisers under air attack had to decide whether or not to jettison torpedoes to prevent them from being detonated during the attack. In one instance, the heavy cruiser Chikuma jettisoned her Type 93s just before being hit by bombs from several USN dive bombers at the Battle of the Santa Cruz Islands. It was initially believed that during the Battle off Samar (in the eastern Philippines) a 5 in (130 mm) shell from escort carrier USS White Plains struck the heavy cruiser Chōkai which detonated the cruiser's Type 93 torpedoes, causing damage that forced the ship to be scuttled; however, the 2019 discovery by the RV Petrel of the wreck of the Chōkai with her torpedoes intact disproved this theory. The same Samar engagement saw the heavy cruiser Suzuya sunk by the detonation of her Type 93 torpedoes: a bomb near miss starboard amidships set off the torpedoes in the starboard tube mounts; the resultant fires propagated to other torpedoes nearby and beyond; the subsequent explosions damaged one of the boilers and the starboard engine rooms and eventually reached the main magazines.

In addition to Suzuya, the following Japanese warships were sunk or heavily damaged when their Type 93 torpedoes exploded on board:

- Mikuma (sunk; Battle of Midway)
- Furutaka (sunk; Battle of Cape Esperance)
- Aoba (heavily damaged during air attack at Kavieng)
- Yamagumo (sunk; Battle of Surigao Strait)
- Akizuki (sunk; Battle off Cape Engaño)

=== Ships sunk by Type 93 torpedo ===
While the Type 93 torpedo was dangerous to its user as well as its intended target, the Imperial Japanese Navy felt that its effectiveness outweighed its risks. During the course of the war, 22 Allied warships were sunk after Type 93 hits: 8 cruisers, 10 destroyers, and one fleet aircraft carrier (USS Hornet). Thirteen of these had been fatally hit solely by the Type 93, with the rest succumbing to a combination of bombs, gunfire, and torpedoes.

- Dutch destroyer HNLMS Piet Hein, 19 February 1942 by destroyer Asashio.
- Dutch destroyer HNLMS Kortenaer, 27 February 1942 by heavy cruiser Haguro.
- Dutch light cruiser HNLMS Java (1921), 27 February 1942 Battle of the Java Sea by heavy cruiser Nachi.
- Dutch light cruiser HNLMS De Ruyter, 27–28 February 1942 by heavy cruiser Haguro.
- American heavy cruiser USS Houston (CA-30), 1 March 1942 by heavy cruisers Mogami and Mikuma.
- Dutch freighter Enganno, 4 March 1942 by heavy cruiser Chikuma and destroyer Urakaze
- U.S. freighter Bienville, 1 April 1942 by heavy cruiser Chōkai.
- British steamship Ganges, 1 April 1942 by heavy cruiser Chōkai.
- Heavy cruiser USS Quincy (CA-39), 9 August 1942 by heavy cruiser Aoba.
- Heavy cruiser USS Vincennes (CA-44), 9 August 1942 by heavy cruiser Chōkai
- Destroyer USS Blue (DD-387), 22 August 1942 by destroyer Kawakaze.
- Aircraft carrier USS Hornet (CV-8), 26 Oct 1942 by destroyers Akigumo and Makigumo (scuttled).
- Light cruiser USS Juneau (CL-52), 13 November 1942, crippled by destroyer Amatsukaze, finished off by IJN submarine I-26.
- Destroyer USS Barton (DD-599), 13 November 1942 by destroyer Amatsukaze.
- Destroyer USS Laffey (DD-459), 13 November 1942 by destroyer Yukikaze.
- Destroyer USS Walke (DD-416), 15 November 1942 by destroyer Samidare.
- Heavy cruiser USS Northampton (CA-26), 30 November 1942 by destroyers Kagerō and Makinami.
- Destroyer USS Strong (DD-467), 5 July 1943 by destroyer Niizuki
- Light cruiser USS Helena (CL-50), 6 July 1943 by destroyers Suzukaze and Tanikaze
- Destroyer USS Gwin (DD-433), 12 July 1943 by mass torpedo attack from destroyers Yukikaze, Hamakaze, Kiyonami, and Yūgure.
- Destroyer USS Chevalier (DD-451), 7 October 1943 by destroyer Yūgumo.
- Destroyer USS Cooper (DD-695), 3 December 1944 probably by destroyer Take.

==== Possible torpedo hits ====
- British destroyer HMS Stronghold, possibly hit by one or more torpedoes from destroyers Nowaki and Arashi. (Note: Western sources often state Stronghold was torpedoed by the attacking destroyers, but Japanese centric sources only speak of Stronghold being sunk by gunfire)
- American destroyer USS Monssen, possibly hit by one or more torpedoes from destroyer Asagumo. (Note: Asagumo fired torpedoes at Monssen, and some sources state they hit the ship. However, only gunfire damage from Hiei, Asagumo, Murasame, and Samidare has been confirmed; US sailors noticed Asagumo's torpedoes running underneath the destroyer, but whether any hit is unknown)

==== Friendly fire incidents ====
- On 1 March 1942, the heavy cruiser Mogami launched a spread of torpedoes which missed their target but hit and sank the Japanese minesweeper W-2 and the transport ships Sakura Maru and Tatsuno Maru, the depot ship Shinshu Maru, and the hospital ship Horai Maru. The destroyer Fubuki had been thought responsible for these sinkings until Mogami was later found to have been the true culprit.

=== Ships damaged by Type 93 Torpedo ===
- Heavy cruiser USS Chicago, crippled by torpedo from heavy cruiser Kako, 9 August 1942.
- Heavy cruiser USS Minneapolis, crippled by two torpedo hits from destroyer Takanami, 30 November 1942.
- Heavy cruiser USS New Orleans, crippled by torpedo hit from Takanami, 30 November 1942.
- Heavy cruiser USS Pensacola, crippled by torpedo hit from destroyer Kawakaze, 30 November 1942.
- New Zealand light cruiser HMZNS Leander, crippled by torpedo hit probably from destroyer Yukikaze, 13 July 1943.
- Light cruiser USS Honolulu, crippled by mass torpedo spread from destroyers Yukikaze, Hamakaze, Kiyonami, and Yūgure, 13 July 1943.
- Light cruiser USS Saint Louis, badly damaged by mass torpedo spread from destroyers Yukikaze, Hamakaze, Kiyonami, and Yūgure, 13 July 1943.
- Destroyer USS Selfridge, crippled by torpedo hit from destroyer Samidare, 7 October 1943.
- Destroyer USS Foote, crippled by torpedo hit from destroyer Samidare, 2 November 1943.

== Surviving examples ==
Several examples are displayed in museums. This is an incomplete list:

- Imperial War Museum Duxford, England.
- Papua New Guinea National Museum, Waigani.
- USS Arizona Memorial, Pearl Harbor, Hawaii.
- U.S. Naval Academy, Annapolis, Maryland – displayed outside in small park in front of Dahlgren Hall. The torpedo flanks a pathway on the other side of which is a Type 91 Japanese air-launched torpedo.
- Yūshūkan museum, Tokyo, Japan.
- In store at Explosion Museum of Naval Firepower, part of the National Museum of the Royal Navy, Gosport, Hampshire, England
- Navy Yard, Washington D.C.

A number are also located within the war wrecks of Chuuk (Truk) Lagoon, specifically in the holds of the San Francisco Maru and Seiko Maru.

== See also ==
- List of weapons of the Japanese Navy
- Torpedo
- Type 90 torpedo
- Type 91 torpedo
- Type 95 torpedo
- War Plan Orange

== Bibliography ==
- Boyne, Walter (1995). Clash of Titans. NY, US: Simon and Schuster. ISBN 978-0-684-80196-4.
- Brown, David (1990). Warship Losses of World War Two. London, Great Britain: Arms and Armour. ISBN 978-0-85368-802-0.
- Hornfischer, James D. (2004). Last Stand of the Tin Can Sailors. Bantam. ISBN 0-553-80257-7.
- Morison, Samuel Eliot (1950). History of United States Naval Operations in World War II: Breaking the Bismarcks Barrier. New York.
- Morison, Samuel Eliot (1984). History of United States Naval Operations in World War Two. Vol. 3. Boston, US: Little, Brown, and Company.
- Shigetaka, Onda (November 1988). "Chapter 5, Between "Kaiten" and "Ohka"". "Tokko" or Kamikaze attack (in Japanese). Tokyo, Japan: Kodan-sha. ISBN 978-4-06-204181-2.
- Smyers, Richard Paul (2012). "Question 17/48: Japanese Tuype 93 Oxygen Torpedoes". Warship International. XLIX (2): 172–173. ISSN 0043-0374.
