= Japanese cruiser Chōkai =

Takao-class heavy cruiser

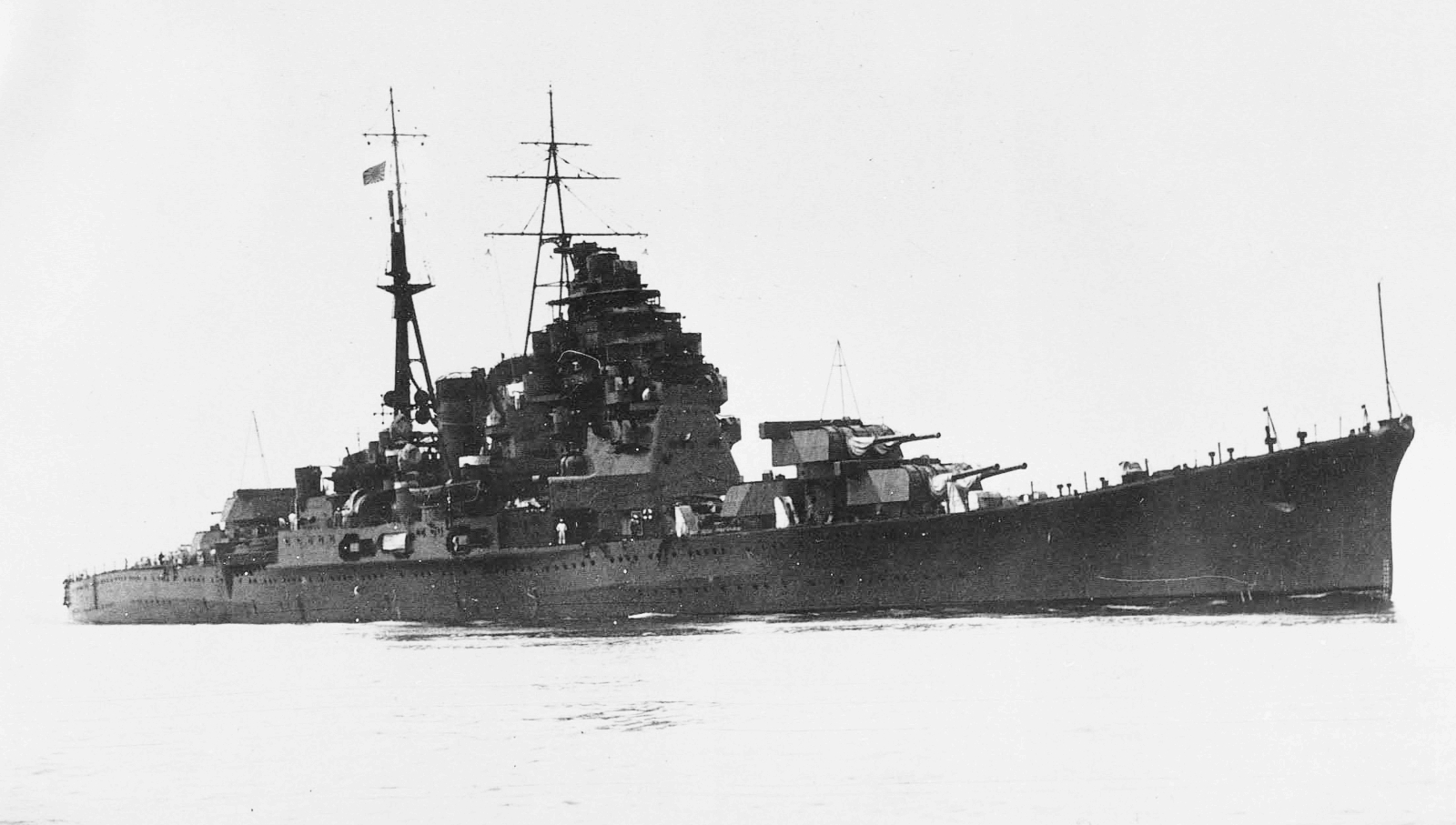
- Chōkai in 1933

History

Empire of Japan
- Name: Chōkai
- Namesake: Mount Chōkai
- Builder: Mitsubishi
- Laid down: 26 March 1928
- Launched: 5 April 1931
- Commissioned: 30 June 1932
- Stricken: 20 December 1944
- Fate: Scuttled after gunfire/bomb damage in Battle off Samar, 25 October 1944

General characteristics
- Class & type: Takao-class cruiser
- Displacement: 15,781 tons
- Length: 203.76 m (668.5 ft)
- Beam: 19 m (62 ft)
- Draught: 6.3 m (21 ft)
- Propulsion: 130,000 hp (97,000 kW)
- Speed: 35.5 knots (65.7 km/h)
- Range: 8,000 nautical miles (15,000 km) at 14 knots (26 km/h)
- Complement: 773
- Armament: Original layout: 10 (5x2) 20 cm/50 3rd Year Type naval gun in Model E turrets, 4 (4x1) Type 89 120 mm (5 in) in Model B *2 mounts, 2 (2x1) 40 mm (1.6 in) AA guns; 2 (2x1) 7.7 mm Vickers MG; 8 (4x2) 61 cm torpedo tubes (4×2, 24 Type 90 torpedoes); Final layout: 10 (5x2) 20 cm/50 3rd Year Type naval gun in Model E turrets, 4 (4x1) Type 89 120 mm (5 in) in Model B *2 mounts, 38 (4x2, 22x1) Type 96 25 mm (1.0 in) AA guns; 8 (4x2) 61 cm torpedo tubes (4×2, 24 Type 93 torpedoes)
- Armor: Machinery belts: 102 mm (4.0 in); Magazine belts: 127 mm (5.0 in) tapered to 38 mm (1.5 in); Main deck: 35 mm (1.4 in) (max); Bulkheads: 76 mm (3.0 in) to 100 mm (3.9 in); Turrets: 25 mm (0.98 in)
- Aircraft carried: 2
- Aviation facilities: 2 catapults

Chōkai (鳥海) was a Takao-class heavy cruiser, armed with ten 20 cm (8 in) guns, four 12 cm (5 in) guns, eight tubes for the Type 93 torpedo, and assorted anti-aircraft guns. Named for Mount Chōkai, Chōkai was designed with the Imperial Japanese Navy strategy of the great "Decisive Battle" in mind, and built in 1932 by Mitsubishi's shipyard in Nagasaki.

Chōkai participated in numerous actions during the Pacific War including the Battle of Savo Island off Guadalcanal, in which she, along with other Japanese cruisers, sank the heavy cruisers USS Astoria, USS Vincennes and USS Quincy. She was sunk in the Battle off Samar in October 1944.

== Design ==
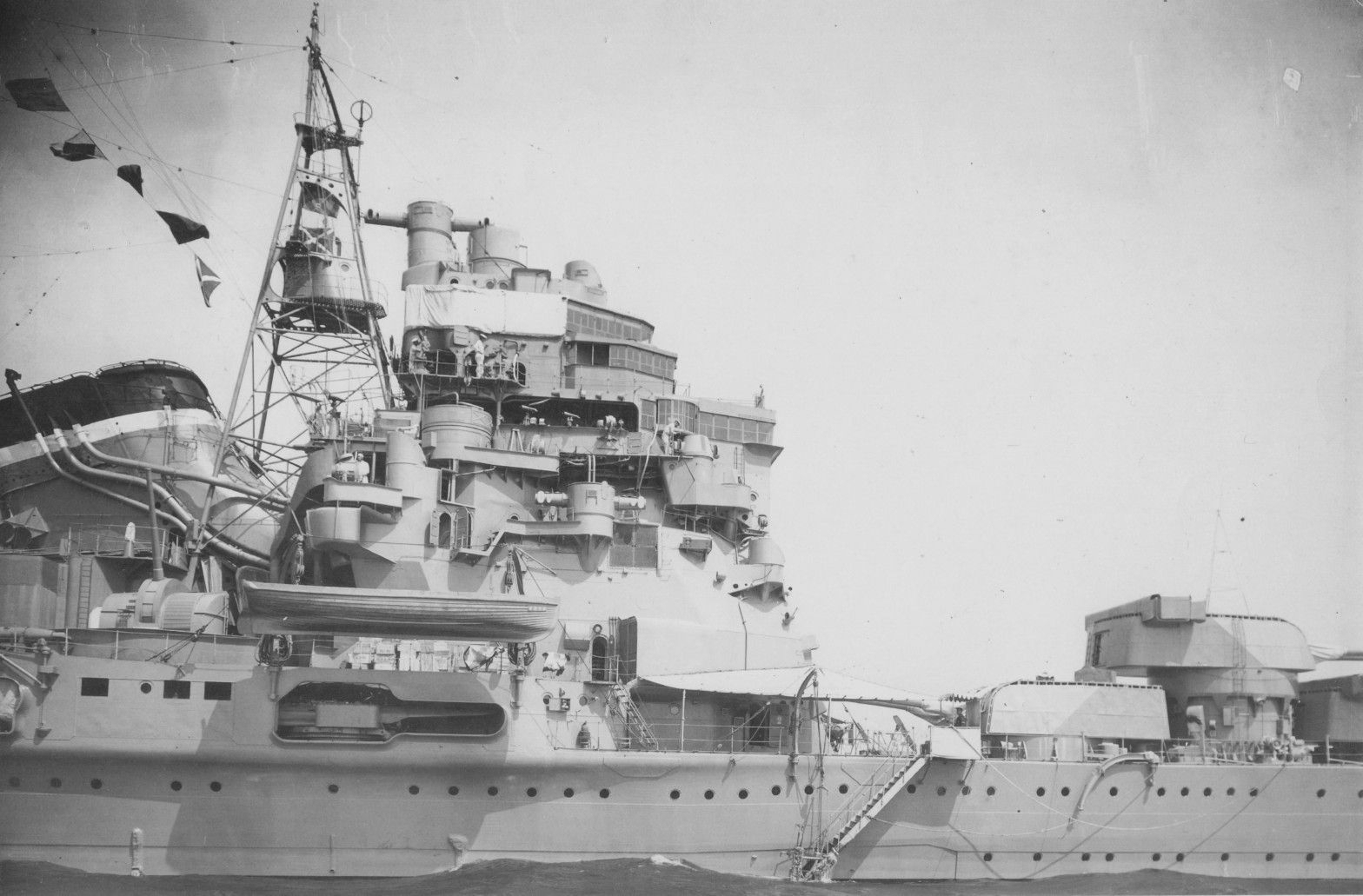
The bridge of Chōkai

The Takao-class cruisers were an improved version of the previous Myōkō-class design, incorporating technical elements learned with the development of the experimental light cruiser Yūbari. They had a distinctive profile with a large, raked main smokestack, and a smaller, straight, second smokestack. Intended to address issues with the Myōkō class, the Takao class had thicker armor, dual-purpose main guns which could be used against aircraft, and torpedo launchers moved to the upper deck for greater safety. However, as with its predecessors, the Takao class was also top-heavy.

The Takao class displaced 16,875 t (16,608 long tons). Chōkai was 203.8 metres (669 ft) long, with a beam of 20.4 metres (67 ft), draft of 6.32 metres (20.7 ft) and was capable of 35.25 knots.

Propulsion was by 12 Kampon boilers driving four sets of single-impulse geared turbine engines, with four shafts turning three-bladed propellers. The ship was armored with a 127 mm (5.0 in) side belt, and 35 mm (1.4 in) armored deck;, the bridge was armored with 10 to 16 mm (0.39 to 0.63 in) armored plates.

Chōkai's main battery was ten 20 cm/50 3rd Year Type naval guns, the heaviest armament of any heavy cruiser in the world at the time, mounted in five twin turrets. Her secondary armament included four Type 10 12 cm dual purpose guns with four single mounts, two on each side, and 8 Type 90 torpedoes in four twin launchers, with 16 as reloads. She was very deficient in anti-aircraft capability, with only two 40 mm (1.57 in) anti-aircraft guns and two 7.7 mm machine guns. Her last refit removed the two 40 mm and 7.7 mm anti-aircraft guns in exchange for a total of 38 Type 96 25 mm (1.0 in) in four twin and 22 single mounts. Her torpedoes were upgraded to the more powerful Type 93 torpedoes. Uniquely to Chōkai, she did not receive the extensive refit her sisters did, keeping the 12 cm guns and four twin torpedo tubes, whereas her sisters received the Type 89 127 mm (5.0 in) and four quad torpedo tubes.

== Operational history ==
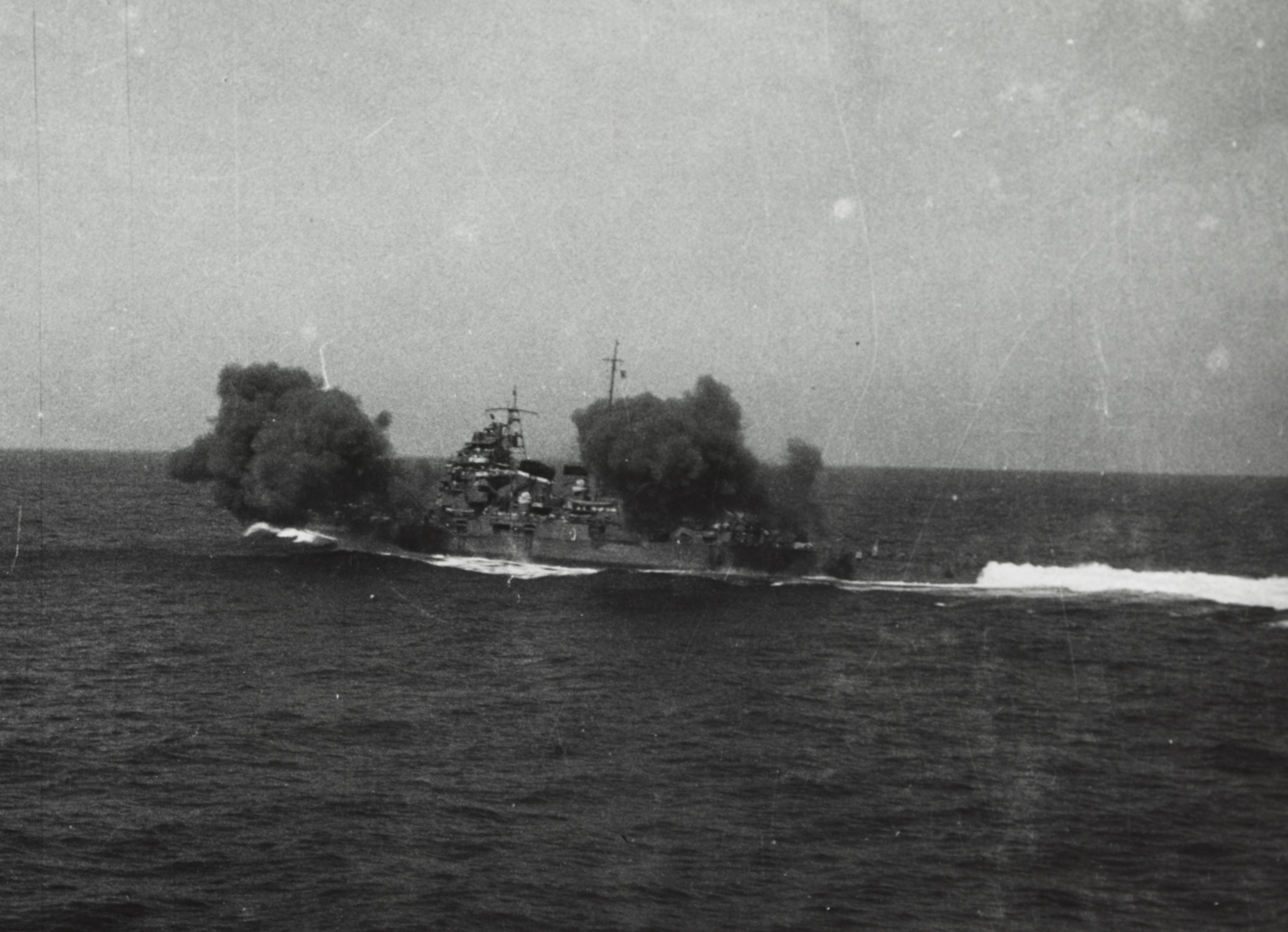
Chōkai firing her 20cm main battery guns, during exercises in 1933

At the start of the Pacific War, Chōkai supported the invasion of Malaya and participated in the pursuit of the Royal Navy's battleship Force Z. During January and February 1942, Chōkai was involved in operations to seize the oil-rich Dutch East Indies and the island of Borneo. Steaming near Cape St. Jacques, Chōkai struck a reef, sustaining hull damage on 22 February 1942. On 27 February, she reached Singapore for repairs.

After repairs, Chōkai was once again assigned to a support role in an invasion, this time the landings at Iri, Sumatra, and the invasion of the Andaman Islands and the seizure of Port Blair a few days later. Afterwards, Chōkai sailed to Mergui, Burma.

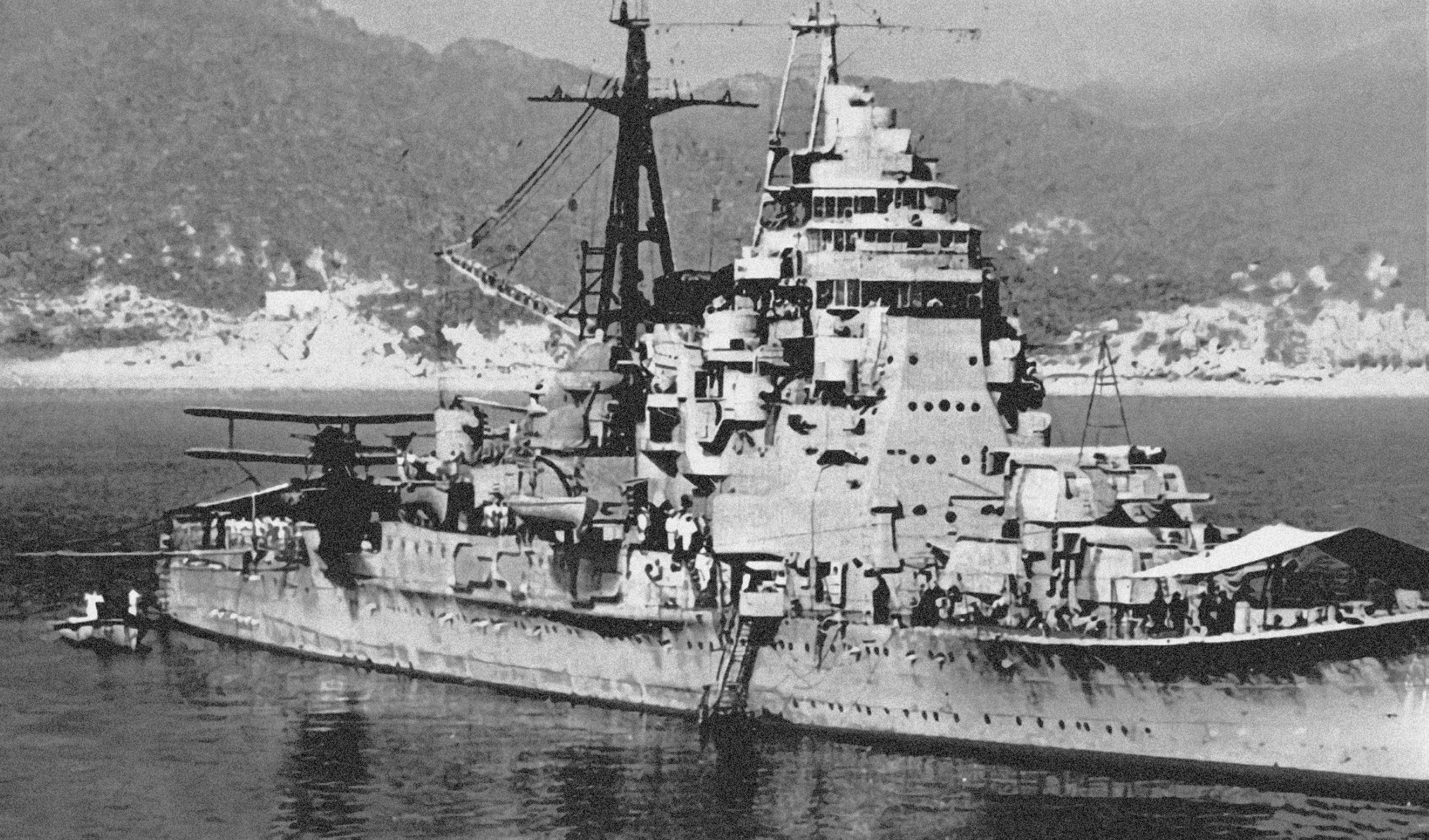
Chōkai at anchor, carrying Mitsubishi F1M floatplanes

On 1 April 1942, Chōkai left Mergui to participate a raid on merchant shipping in the Bay of Bengal. First, Chōkai torpedoed and sank the U.S. freighter Bienville, and later on, the British steamship Ganges on 6 April. With her role in the operation successfully concluded, Chōkai returned to Yokosuka on 22 April 1942.

=== Battle of Savo Island ===
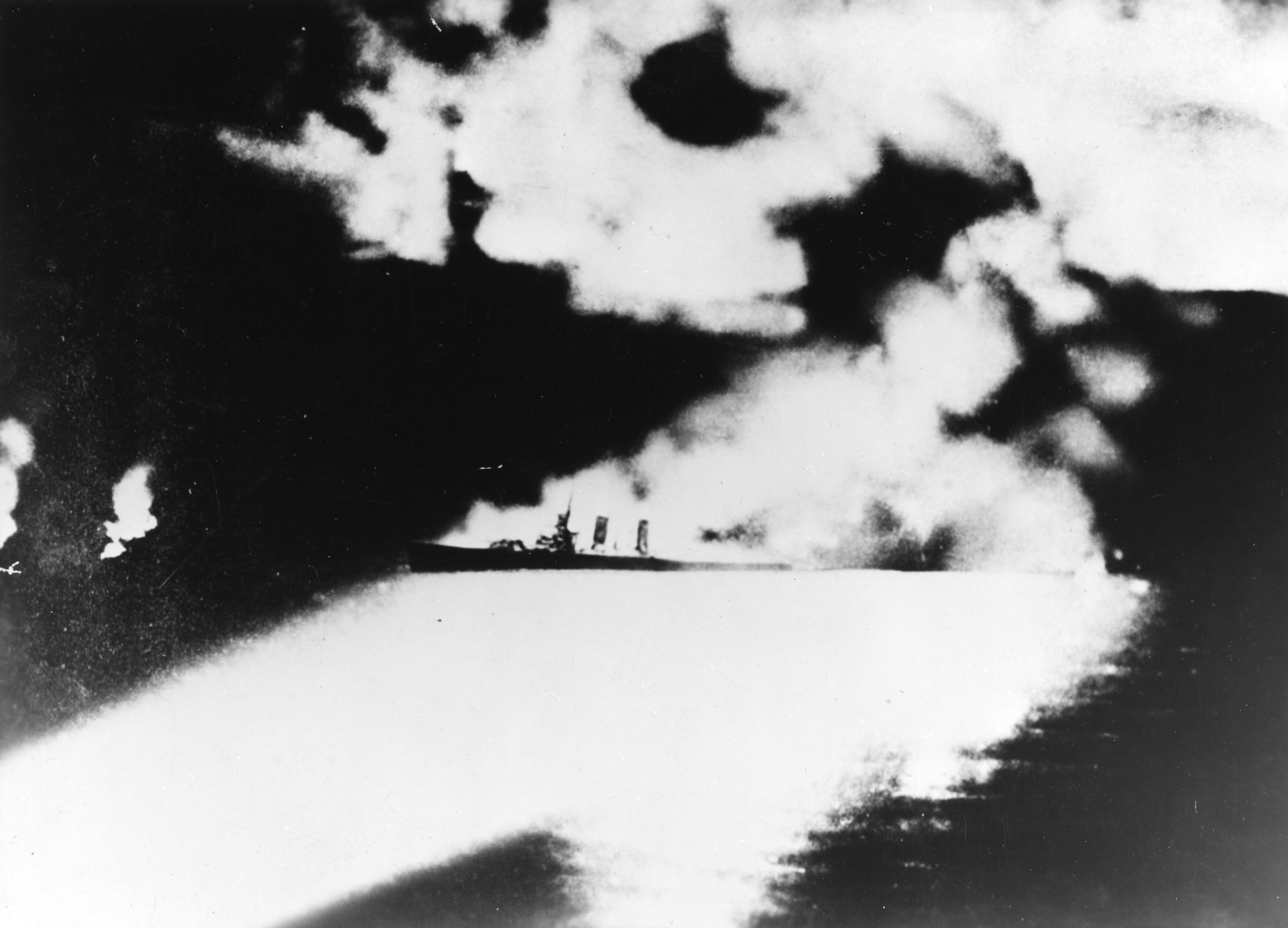
USS Quincy being illuminated by searchlights of Chōkai during the Battle of Savo Island.

By mid-July 1942, Chōkai was made the new flagship of Vice Admiral Mikawa Gunichi and his 8th Fleet. She proceeded towards Rabaul. On 7 August 1942, with Guadalcanal having been invaded by the Americans, Chōkai headed for the Guadalcanal waters, with Vice Admiral Mikawa aboard. In the battle of Savo Island, Mikawa's squadron of heavy cruisers, consisting of Chokai herself, and the heavy cruisers Furutaka, Kako, Aoba, and Kinugasa inflicted a devastating defeat on an Allied cruiser squadron. First, Chōkai and Aoba targeted the Australian heavy cruiser Canberra, followed by Furutaka and Kako joining in, and all four ships sank Canberra with gunfire. Following that, Chōkai pounded the heavy cruiser USS Astoria, and as Aoba, Kako, and Kinugasa joined in, Astoria sank. Finally, while other cruisers lit the cruiser USS Quincy aflame and sank her, Chōkai sank the heavy cruiser USS Vincennes with two hits from her long lance torpedoes. The battle of Savo Island was one of the most devastating Japanese naval victories of the war, the four allied heavy cruisers sunk and several more ships damaged or crippled. However, Chōkai sustained several hits from Quincy and Astoria, disabling her "A" turret and killing 34 men. Chōkai returned to Rabaul for temporary repairs. For the rest of the Solomon Islands campaign, Chōkai would fight in an assortment of night battles with the U.S. Navy, sustaining varied, but mostly minor, damage.

=== Subsequent action ===
Relieved as the Eighth Fleet flagship shortly after the final evacuation of Guadalcanal, Chōkai headed back to Yokosuka on 20 February 1943. Tasked with various minor duties for the remainder of 1943 and first half of 1944, Chōkai was made the flagship of the Cruiser Division Four ("CruDiv 4") comprising Takao, Maya, Atago, and Chōkai on 3 August 1944. All four ships took part in the Battle of the Philippine Sea.

=== Battle of Leyte Gulf ===
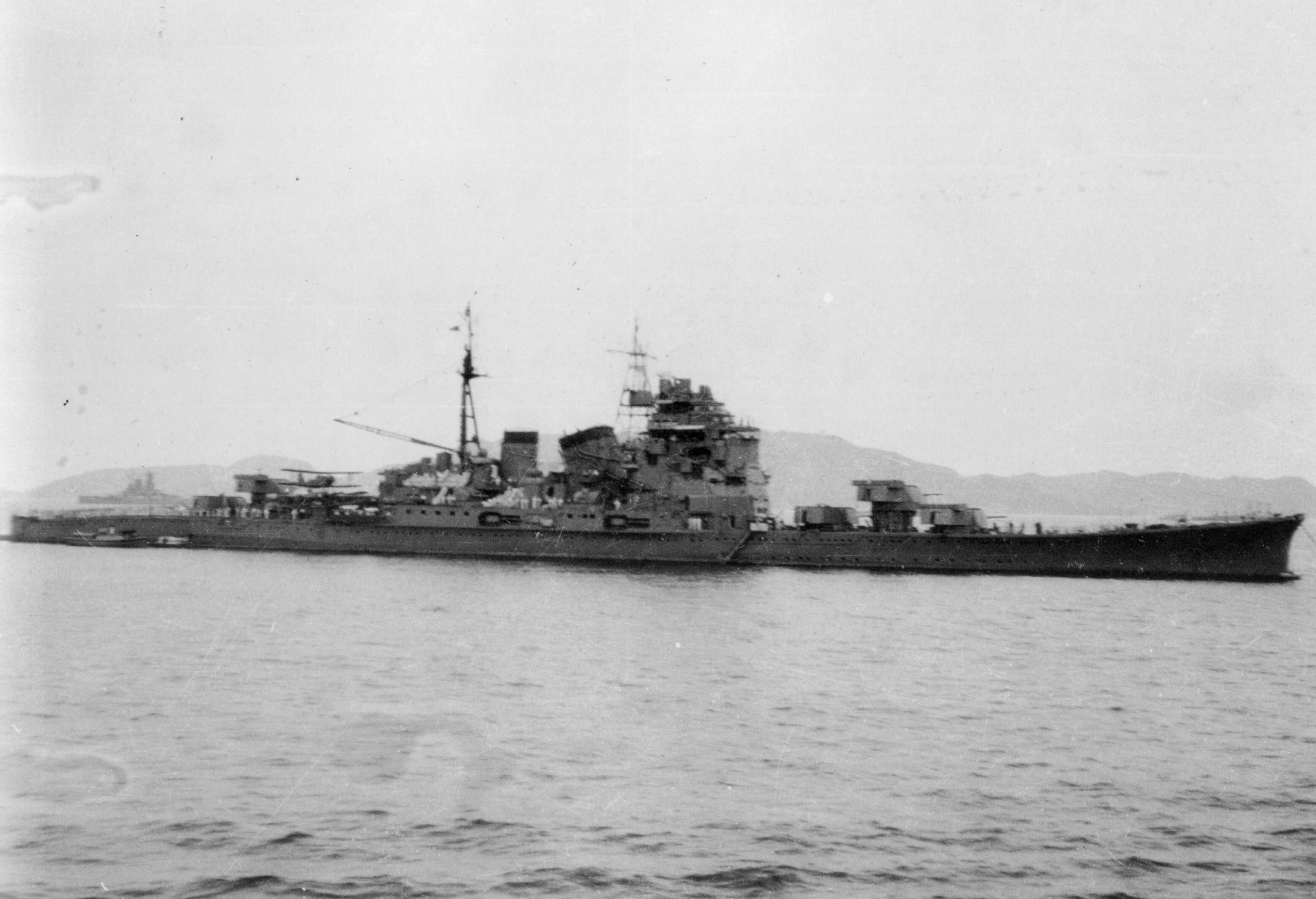
Chōkai at anchor at Truk, 20 November 1942. Battleship Yamato can be seen in the left background

CruDiv 4 was part of Admiral Takeo Kurita's large fleet of IJN battleships, cruisers, and destroyers that took part in the various engagements of the Battle of Leyte Gulf at the Philippines.

CruDiv 4 suffered a harrowing submarine attack on 23 October 1944, with the sinking of Maya and Atago (which was Kurita's flagship, though he survived), while Takao was left permanently crippled, leaving Chōkai as the only undamaged ship of CruDiv 4.

Chōkai was then transferred to Cruiser Division Five, where she survived an air attack on 24 October 1944, while the battleship Musashi was sunk.

==== Sunk in the battle off Samar ====
On the morning of 25 October, Chōkai engaged an American force of escort carriers, destroyers, and destroyer escorts in the Battle off Samar. During her approach to the US escort carriers, Chōkai was hit several times on the port side amidships by 5"/38 caliber guns of this force's escort carriers and destroyers. It was believed at the time that one of these hits may have set off the eight deck-mounted Japanese Type 93 "Long Lance" torpedoes; however, RV Petrel's expedition in 2019 found Chōkai's torpedoes still intact. An explosion was observed aboard Chōkai before a TBM Avenger from the USS Kitkun Bay dropped a 500 lb (230 kg) bomb on her forward machinery room. Fires began to rage and she went dead in the water. She was scuttled later that day by torpedoes from the destroyer Fujinami (11°22′N 126°22′E), which also rescued some of her crew. Two days later Fujinami was sunk with the loss of all hands, including the Chōkai survivors.

== Wreck ==
Chōkai sits upright in 5,173 metres (16,972 ft) of water on the edge of the Philippine Deep. RV Petrel discovered the wreck of Chōkai on 5 May 2019 and dived it via ROV on 30 May 2019.

== Bibliography ==
- Dull, Paul S. (1978). A Battle History of the Imperial Japanese Navy, 1941–1945. Naval Institute Press. ISBN 0-87021-097-1.
- Lacroix, Eric; Linton Wells (1997). Japanese Cruisers of the Pacific War. Naval Institute Press. ISBN 0-87021-311-3.
- Thorne, Phil (2001). "Re: Fate of Chikuma and Chokai". Warship International. XXXVIII (2). International Naval Research Organization: 114–115. ISSN 0043-0374.
