= Japanese cruiser Furutaka =

Japanese Furutake-class heavy cruiser launched 1925

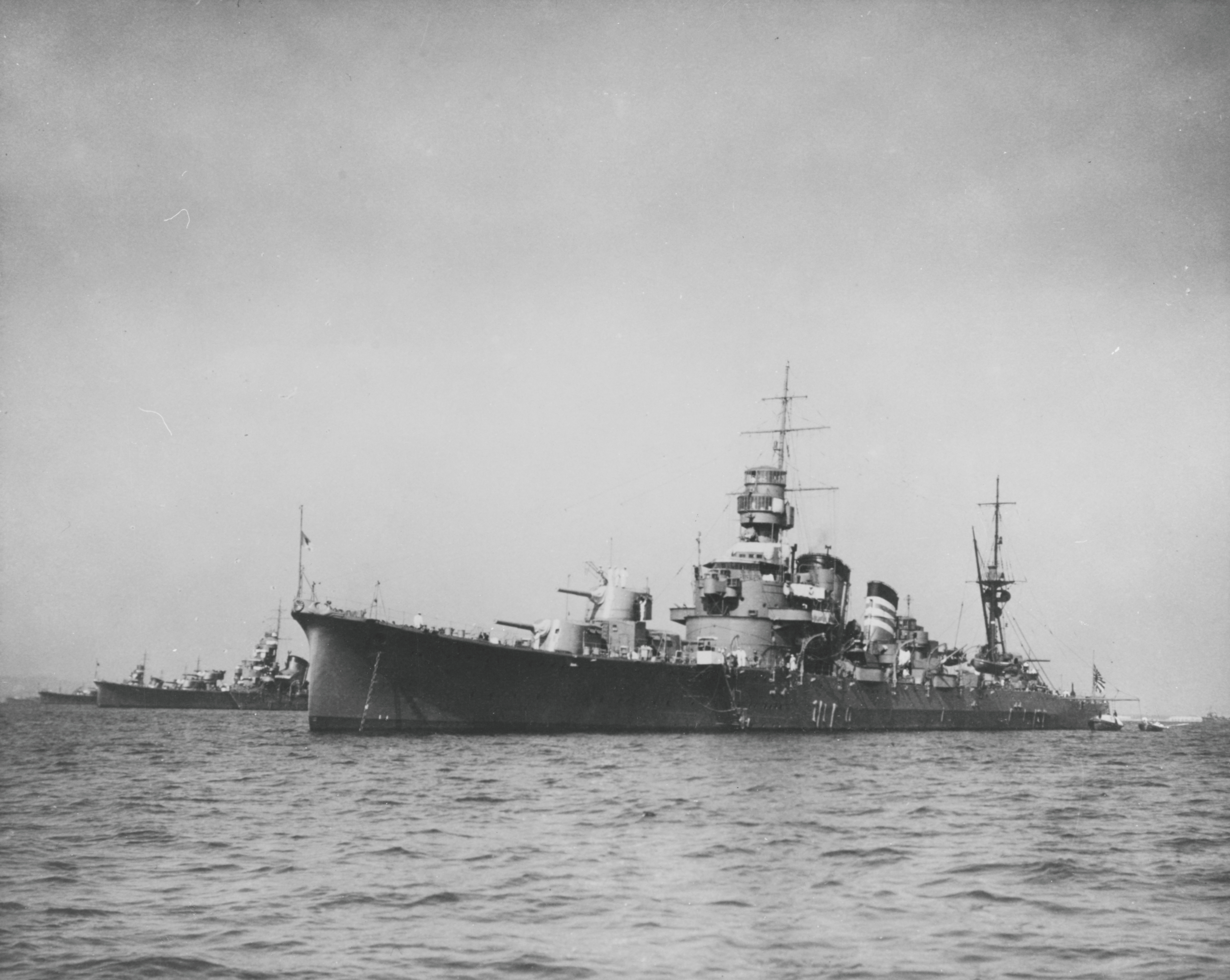
- Furutaka at anchor off Shinagawa, alongside Aoba and Kinugasa in the left distance, October 1935

History

Empire of Japan
- Name: Furutaka
- Namesake: Mount Furutaka
- Ordered: 1923 Fiscal Year
- Builder: Mitsubishi shipyards, Nagasaki
- Laid down: 5 December 1922
- Launched: 25 February 1925
- Commissioned: 31 March 1926
- Stricken: 20 December 1944
- Fate: Sunk 12 October 1942 at the Battle of Cape Esperance

General characteristics
- Class & type: Furutaka-class heavy cruiser
- Displacement: 7,950 long tons (8,078 t) (standard); 9,150 long tons (9,297 t) (after modification)
- Length: 185.1 m (607 ft 3.4 in) (o/a)
- Beam: 16.55 m (54 ft 3.6 in)
- Draft: 5.56 m (18 ft 2.9 in)
- Installed power: 12 Kampon boilers; 102,000 shp (76,000 kW)
- Propulsion: 4 shafts; 4 geared steam turbines
- Speed: 34.5 knots (63.9 km/h; 39.7 mph)
- Range: 6,000 nmi (11,000 km; 6,900 mi) at 14 knots (26 km/h; 16 mph)
- Complement: 625
- Armament: (initial); 6 × single 20 cm (7.9 in) guns; 4 × single 76.2 mm (3 in) AA guns; 6 × twin 61 cm (24 in) torpedo tubes; (final); 3 × twin 20.3 cm (8 in) guns; 4 × single 12 cm (4.7 in) AA guns; 4 × twin 25 mm (0.98 in) AA guns; 2 × quad 61 cm (24 in) torpedo tubes
- Armor: Belt: 76 mm (3.0 in); Deck: 36 mm (1.4 in)
- Aircraft carried: 1–2 × floatplanes
- Aviation facilities: 1 × catapult (from 1933)

Furutaka (Japanese: 古鷹; named after Mount Furutaka) was the lead ship in the two-vessel Furutaka-class of heavy cruisers in the Imperial Japanese Navy. The ship was named after Mount Furutaka, located on Etajima, Hiroshima, immediately behind the Imperial Japanese Navy Academy. She was commissioned in 1926 and was sunk 12 October 1942 by USS Salt Lake City and USS Buchanan at the Battle of Cape Esperance.

== Design ==
Design work on the Furutaka class of heavy cruisers began in the late 1910s in conjunction with the experimental light cruiser Yūbari under the direction of noted naval engineer Yuzuru Hiraga. Both types incorporated radical weight-saving measures including using the side belt armor as part of the hull's structural strength. The Furutaka-class cruisers were intended to counter the American Omaha and British Hawkins-class cruisers. Despite Hiraga's efforts, the two Furutaka-class ships were about 1,000 long tons (1,016 t) overweight.

=== Characteristics ===
Plan and profile sketch of the Furutaka class as originally configured

Furutaka was 185.17 meters (607 ft 6 in) long overall and had a beam of 15.77 m (51 ft 9 in) and a draft of 5.56 m (18 ft 3 in). She displaced 8,100 long tons (8,200 t) normally and up to 9,433 long tons (9,584 t) at full load. The ship's superstructure consisted of a large conning tower and bridge structure forward and a smaller, secondary structure aft. Her hull had a flush deck that had an unusual wavy profile that gradually reduced in height from bow to stern. Furutaka had a crew of 45 officers and 559 enlisted men.

Her propulsion system consisted of four geared steam turbines that drove four screw propellers. Steam was provided by twelve water-tube boilers that burned oil and coal; the boilers were vented through three uptakes, the first two of which were ducted together into a single large funnel. The ship's propulsion system was rated to produce 102,000 shaft horsepower (76,000 kW) for a top speed of 34.5 knots (63.9 km/h; 39.7 mph). While steaming at a more economical speed of 14 knots (26 km/h; 16 mph), the ship could cruise for up to 6,000 nautical miles (11,000 km; 6,900 mi).

The ship was armed with a main battery of six 20 cm (7.9 in) /50 guns in single gun turrets. The turrets were arranged in groups of three on the centerline; the forward set consisted of two forward-facing mounts, one superfiring over the other, with the third turret immediately behind, facing rearward. The aft set of three turrets were mirrored in the same pattern: two turrets facing aft, one superfiring over the other, and the other turret just ahead, facing forward. All six turrets could fire to either broadside. In addition, Furutaka fitted with four 7.6 cm (3 in) anti-aircraft guns mounted individually, along with a pair of 7.7 mm (0.30 in) Lewis guns for close-range defense. The ship carried a heavy torpedo armament consisting of twelve 61 cm (24 in) torpedo tubes. These were arranged in fixed pairs along the side of the ship.

Furutaka was protected by an armor belt that was 7.6 cm (3 in) thick along with an armor deck that was 3.49 cm (1.375 in) thick; the deck connected to the top of the belt. The ammunition magazines received 5.1 cm (2 in) of armor protection, and the main battery turrets had a maximum thickness of 2.5 cm (1 in). The armor layout was only intended to defeat 15 cm (6 in) shells. And because the ship was badly overweight, the belt was partially submerged, which reduced its effectiveness.

=== Modifications ===
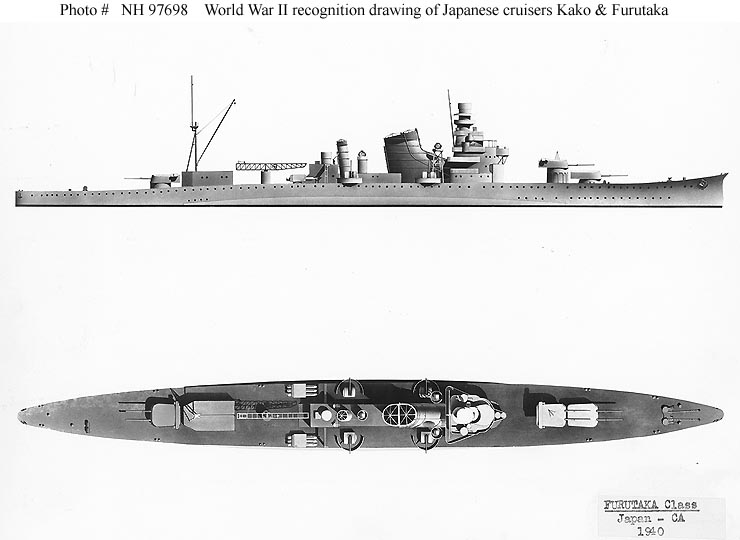
World War II recognition drawing of Furutaka

Furutaka underwent a series of significant refits, beginning with modifications to her funnels in late 1926 and early 1927; smoke from the funnels caused excessive interference with the bridge and other control platforms. Accordingly, the funnels were increased in height and their caps were altered. The ship next saw another shipyard period in 1930, when the flying-off platform for her aircraft was removed. Furutaka was modernized at Kure Naval Base in 1932–1933, receiving new anti-aircraft guns, an aircraft catapult, and a Nakajima E4N2 floatplane. The old 7.6 cm anti-aircraft guns were replaced with an equal number of 12 cm (4.7 in) /45 guns, which were fitted in individual mounts with gun shields. Four 13.2 mm (0.52 in) Hotchkiss machine guns were installed in twin mounts on sponsons that were added to the forward conning tower.

A more extensive reconstruction took place from April 1937 to April 1939, also at Kure. The six single 7.87 in (200 mm) Mark I main battery was replaced by three twin-turrets housing the 8 in (203 mm)/50-cal Mark I guns from Haguro and Ashigara re-bored to Mark II, as there was a shortage of Mark II guns at this time. The 12 cm guns were rearranged to clear space for storage space for additional torpedoes. Four more 13.2 mm machine guns were added to the forward conning tower, along with a control room to direct all of those guns. The original fixed torpedo tubes were replaced with a pair of trainable quadruple mounts on the upper deck. They were initially supplied with Type 90 torpedoes, but by 1940, these had been replaced by the Type 93 torpedoes (well known as the "Long Lance").

The forward conning tower was rebuilt and improved fire-control equipment was installed. Her mixed coal-and-oil-burning boilers were replaced with ten purely oil-fired Kanpon boilers. Facilities were upgraded for two E7K2 floatplanes. All of the changes resulted in a significant growth in displacement, to 9,000 long tons (9,100 t) standard and 10,651 long tons (10,822 t) at full load. Large bulges were installed to maintain the ship's draft despite the increased weight of the new equipment; this had the added benefit of improving the strength of the hull and resistance to underwater damage. The improvements increased her crew to 50 officers and 589 enlisted sailors.

During a refit in September 1941, a degaussing coil was installed.

== Service history ==
=== Inter-war period ===
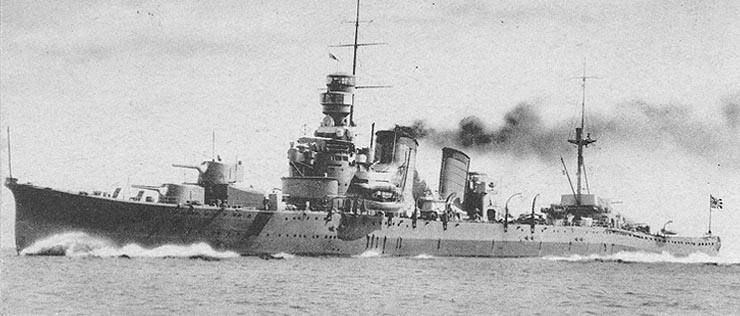
Furutaka after her initial refit

==== 1922–1930 ====
Construction of Furutaka and her sister ship Kako were authorized in March 1922, and contracts were placed for the two vessels on 22 June. The keel for the new cruiser was laid down on 5 December that year at the Mitsubishi shipyard in Nagasaki. Civil unrest in Japan in 1923 slowed work on the ship. Her completed hull was launched on 25 February 1925, and fitting-out work was scheduled to be completed by 23 November. Problems with the ship's turbines during sea trials delayed completion until 31 March 1926, the day she was commissioned into active service. Upon entering service, Furutaka was assigned to Cruiser Division 5, along with Kako and the light cruisers Natori, Yura, and Sendai; the cruisers were initially based at Yokosuka Naval Arsenal. Furutaka became the divisional flagship.

On 9 May 1926, Furutaka made a short trip from Yokohama to Shimoda with a number of senior government officials aboard, including Vice Admiral Prince Fushimi Hiroyasu; Prime Minister Wakatsuki Reijirō; and Navy Minister Takarabe Takeshi. Kako replaced Furutaka as the division flagship on 1 December while the latter underwent modifications that lasted into February 1927. By that time, the ships assigned to the division were the two Furutakas and the light cruisers Jintsū and Naka. Furutaka rejoined the unit for a cruise to China that began on 27 March, which included a stop in Amoy, China, along with Makung in the Pescadores. By 26 April, the ships had arrived back in Japan, stopping first at Sasebo. Summer training exercises with the rest of the fleet were held in the Bungo Channel. During the first phase of the maneuvers in August, Naka and Jintsū were damaged in collisions, leaving just Furutaka and Kako to operate during the second phase conducted in September and October. The exercises concluded with a fleet review off Yokohama on 30 October. The two recently completed Aoba-class cruisers joined Furutaka and Kako in Cruiser Division 5 in December, Kinugasa becoming the new division flagship. Furutaka went into the shipyard for alterations between 2 and 16 December.

Furutaka and the rest of the division sailed on 29 May 1928, bound for Qingdao, China. From there, they proceeded to Ryojun in the Kwantung Leased Territory, arriving on 9 April. The ships then moved to Dairen, also in the Kwangtung territory, where they joined the second expedition to Shandong, China. The Japanese force brought soldiers to Qingdao in response to fighting during the Northern Expedition that threatened Japanese interests in the area, which led to the Jinan incident. Furutaka and the other cruisers thereafter returned home, and they were present for the annual summer and autumn maneuvers. All four vessels participated in a major fleet review held on 4 December to mark the coronation of Emperor Hirohito. Furutaka and the other cruisers made another cruise to Shandong and then Ryojun that began on 28 March 1929 and concluded in April. Furutaka was placed in reserve on 7 November for the modification work that lasted until 1 December 1930.

==== 1930–1941 ====
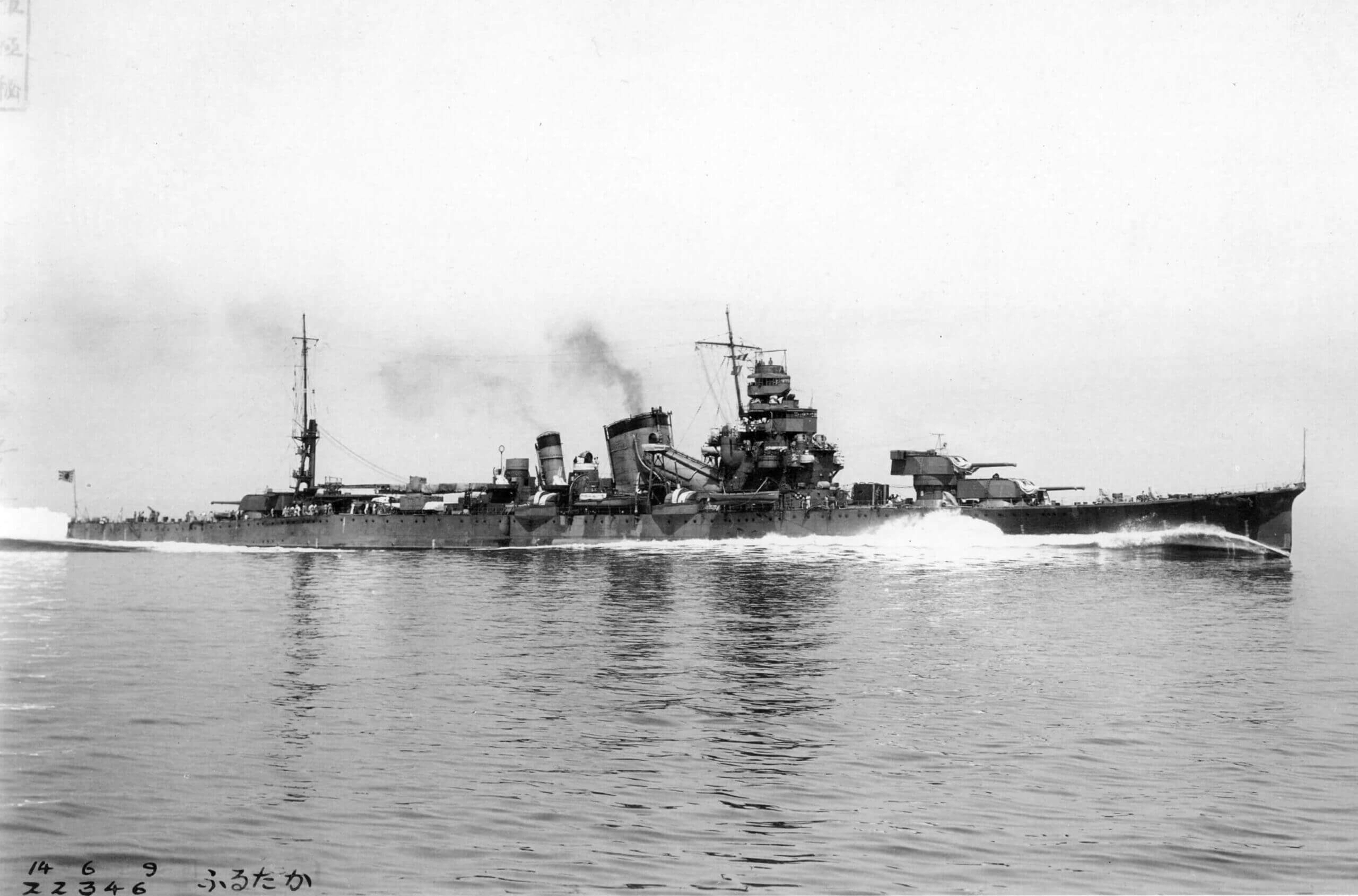
Furutaka on speed trials, June 1939

Upon returning to active service after the conclusion of her refit, Furutaka rejoined Cruiser Division 5; at the same time, Kako and Kinugasa were decommissioned for their refits, leaving just Aoba in the unit with her. The two cruisers visited Qingdao in April 1931. After returning to Yokosuka the following month, Furutaka was dry docked for periodic maintenance that lasted from 29 May to 29 September. She and Aoba were also decommissioned on 1 December, leaving Cruiser Division 5 without active units. Furutaka was moved to Kure on 1 February 1932, where she was dry docked again for repairs to her hull that lasted from 23 February to 30 April. Furutaka remained in reserve until 15 November 1933, when she was assigned to Cruiser Division 6, by which time her sister and the two Aobas had already been transferred there. Furutaka was soon dry docked at Kure for needed updates, including the installation of a new wireless system, which lasted from 20 November to 31 January 1934. Damage to her hull necessitated emergency repairs at Maizuru Naval Arsenal from 5 to 8 September. The ship then joined the other two cruisers of the division at Ryojun for another voyage to Tsingtao, which concluded in Sasebo on 5 October.

The three cruisers of 6th division sailed on 29 March 1935 for another short cruise in Chinese waters, this time off the mouth of the Yangtze. Furutaka and the others arrived back in Yokosuka on 4 April. Another dry docking followed for Furutaka for repairs that lasted from 28 May to 20 June. She thereafter rejoined the unit for the annual summer and autumn maneuvers. The ship was placed back in reserve on 15 November, attached to the Kure Guard Squadron. She remained there until 15 February 1936, after which she laid idle until 6 March 1937, when she was taken into the shipyard at Kure for her major reconstruction, which lasted until 30 April 1939. This was earlier than originally planned, because the ship had suffered some damage to her turbine blades in 1935–1936, and was in need of an engine overhaul. After the turrets and torpedo tubes were removed at Kure, Furutaka was moved temporarily to the Osaka Iron Works for alterations to her hull.

As the four Furutaka and Aoba-class cruisers began to return to service after their reconstructions, they were assigned again to Cruiser Division 6, then part of the 1st Fleet. By early 1940, this consisted of only Kinugasa (the flagship) and Furutaka. The two cruisers embarked on a cruise to south China on 26 March 1940, concluding in Takao, Japan, on 2 April. They then sailed into the Seto Inland Sea for training exercises. The two cruisers were present for another fleet review on 11 October, which marked the 2,600th anniversary of the founding of Japan. The following month, Aoba rejoined the unit, and on 1 March 1941, Kinugasa restored the division to full strength. The other three cruisers had already sailed to patrol in Chinese waters on 24 February, arriving back in the Inland Sea on 3 March. Furutaka and Kako conducted a short cruise in Japanese waters from 5 to 14 September. Furutaka thereafter entered dry dock at Kure for periodic maintenance. As preparations for the upcoming, wide-ranging offensives against Anglo-American forces began in earnest in late 1941, Furutaka and the rest of the division conducted combat drills in mid-October. On 1 November, they were allocated to the South Seas Force. More training followed in the Bungo Channel through the first half of November, after which the cruisers returned to Kure to load fuel, ammunition, and other supplies. They sailed for Hahajima in the Bonin Islands, arriving there on 2 December; by that time, the division had come under the command of Rear Admiral Aritomo Goto.

=== World War II ===
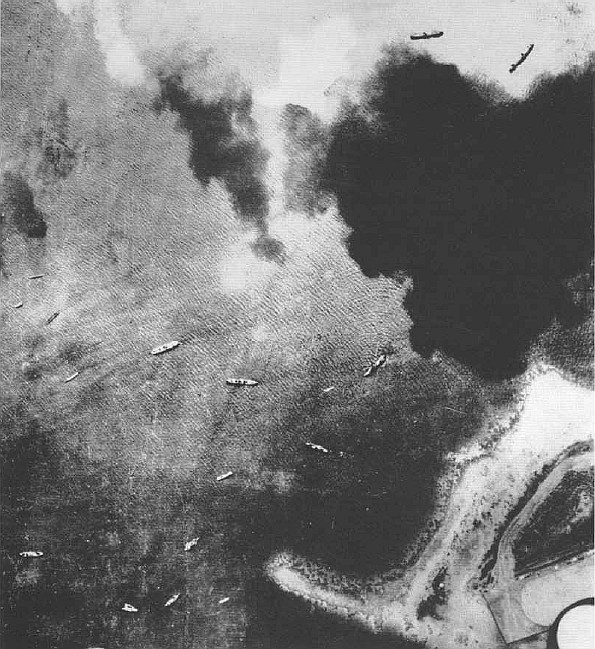
Elements of the Japanese invasion fleet for the attack on Rabaul on 9 January 1942, photographed by an RAAF reconnaissance plane

Furutaka and the rest of 6th Cruiser Division were assigned to support the wide-ranging amphibious invasions in the Central Pacific planned by the Imperial General Headquarters, which were to establish the defensive barrier that would protect the Greater East Asia Co-Prosperity Sphere Japan planned to seize. As part of the South Sea Force, Furutaka was to participate in the invasion of Guam, Wake Island, and Rabaul. The unit also included Yūbari, the two Tenryū-class cruisers, and two divisions of destroyers. Furutaka and the rest of her division departed Hahajima on 4 December to support the invasion of Guam, which took place on 8 December. Transports sent a landing force of some 700 soldiers ashore, which quickly defeated the American garrison, which provided only minimal resistance. Four days later, she and the other cruisers arrived at the Japanese naval base at Truk in the Caroline Islands, and they sailed the following day to provide additional firepower to the second assault on Wake on 22 December, which succeeded in capturing the island the following day. By 10 January 1942, the four cruisers had arrived back at Truk.

With the first two objectives secured in the Central Pacific, the ships of the South Sea Force turned to their next target: Rabaul, on the island of New Britain, and neighboring Kavieng on New Ireland. The ships sailed from Truk on 18 January, as part of the distant covering force for the landing five days later, and by 30 January, Furutaka and the other ships were anchored in the harbor at Rabaul. On 1 February, raids by American aircraft carriers on Japanese positions in the Marshall Islands prompted Goto to sortie with his four cruisers in an attempt to catch the carriers. By 4 February, the cruisers had reached Roi-Namur, and two days later they arrived in Kwajalein, but by that time the Americans had withdrawn, so Goto sailed back to Truk, arriving on 10 February. There, the ships underwent maintenance. Another American carrier raid on 20 February, this time targeting Rabaul, led Goto to sortie again, but the search again proved fruitless and the cruisers were back in Truk on 23 February. In March, Goto's ships covered a series of amphibious assaults in New Guinea and nearby islands, beginning on 8 March with landings at Lae and Salamaua in New Guinea. On 30 March, they escorted the landing force for the occupation of Shortland Island, followed by Kieta on the island of Bougainville the next day. By 10 April, Furutaka and the other cruisers had arrived in Truk, where they underwent periodic maintenance.

By that time, the initial phase of Japanese conquests had been completed, and already in April, the Imperial Headquarters had decided to embark on a second phase of operations. The first of these, codenamed Operation Mo, centered on attacks on Port Moresby in New Guinea and the island of Tulagi in the Solomon Islands. Furutaka and the rest of Cruiser Division 6 were assigned to the operation, forming the core of the Main Force in company with the light carrier Shōhō. The ships sailed from Truk on 30 April and passed through the Bougainville Strait two days later. On 3 May, troops went ashore on Tulagi while the Main Force patrolled offshore; following the landing, the Main Force withdrew toward Buka Island, but an American carrier raid on Tulagi on 4 May prompted Goto to take his ships back east in the direction of Guadalcanal. The Japanese stopped at Shortland to refuel from the oiler Irō on 5 May. The next day, Goto sortied to cover the invasion force for Port Moresby.

==== Battle of the Coral Sea ====
While Furutaka and the rest of the invasion force were en route to Port Moresby on 6 May, American land-based bombers attacked the fleet several times, and the cruisers assisted in repelling the bombers. The following day, Goto's formation came under heavy air attack from American carrier aircraft in the Battle of the Coral Sea. Shōhō was sunk, after which Furutaka and Kinugasa were detached to strengthen the escort around the fleet carrier Shōkaku, while the rest of the invasion fleet withdrew. Shōkaku had also been damaged in the fighting, so Furutaka and Kinugasa escorted her out of the immediate combat area.

By 10 May, the two cruisers had detached from Shōkaku and had arrived back in Kieta. Three days later, they moved to Shortland to refuel, before getting underway again on 15 May, bound for Truk. They arrived there on 17 May and remained in the port until the end of the month. Furutaka and Kinugasa departed on 31 May to return to Kure for refits, Furutaka being repaired and refitted from 5 to 28 June. As a result, she was not available to participate in the Battle of Midway in early June. Furutaka and Kinugasa departed immediately after completing repairs on 28 June and arrived in Truk on 4 July and thereafter embarked on a patrol through the Solomons, including stops at Rekata Bay on Santa Isabel and Queen Carola Harbor on Buka. During these operations, the division was assigned to the newly created 8th Fleet, under the command of Vice Admiral Gunichi Mikawa.

==== Battle of Savo Island ====
In the Battle of Savo Island on 9 August 1942, Cruiser Division 6, the heavy cruiser Chōkai, light cruisers Tenryū and Yūbari and destroyer Yūnagi engaged the Allied forces in a night gun and torpedo action. At about 23:00, Chōkai, Furutaka and Kako all launched their reconnaissance floatplanes. The circling floatplanes dropped flares illuminating the targets and all the Japanese ships opened fire. The heavy cruisers USS Astoria, Quincy and Vincennes were sunk and HMAS Canberra was scuttled. Heavy cruiser USS Chicago was damaged as were the destroyers USS Ralph Talbot and Patterson. On the Japanese side, Chōkai was hit three times, Kinugasa twice, Aoba once and Furutaka was not damaged and returned to Kavieng on 10 August.

During the Battle of the Eastern Solomons in late August, Cruiser Division 6 and Chōkai departed Shortland to provide distant cover for the Guadalcanal reinforcement convoys. That same day, a Consolidated PBY Catalina of VP23's "Black Cats" unsuccessfully attacked Furutaka in daylight. Furutaka shuttled between Kieta and Rabaul as needed to refuel and resupply through mid-September. The submarine S-47 attacked Furutaka south of New Ireland on 12 September, but did no damage.

==== Battle of Cape Esperance ====
So alerted, the American heavy cruisers USS San Francisco and Salt Lake City, and light cruisers USS Boise and Helena—all equipped with radar—and five destroyers steamed around the end of Guadalcanal to block the entrance to Savo Sound.

At 22:35, Helena's radar spotted the Japanese fleet, and the Americans successfully crossed the Japanese "T". Both fleets opened fire, but Admiral Goto, thinking that he was under friendly fire, ordered a 180-degree turn that exposed each of his ships to the American broadsides. Aoba was damaged heavily, and Admiral Goto was mortally wounded on her bridge. With Aoba crippled, Captain Araki of Furutaka turned his ship out of the line of battle to engage Salt Lake City. Destroyer USS Duncan launched two torpedoes toward Furutaka that either missed or failed to detonate. Duncan continued firing at Furutaka until she was put out of action by numerous shell hits. At 23:54, Furutaka was hit by a torpedo from USS Buchanan that flooded her forward engine room and permanently disabled her. During the battle, about 90 shells hit Furutaka and some ignited her Type 93 "Long Lance" torpedoes, starting fires.

At 02:28 on 12 October, Furutaka sank stern first at 09°02′S 159°33′E. Captain Araki and 514 survivors were rescued by the destroyers Hatsuyuki, Murakumo and Shirayuki. Thirty-three crewmen were killed and 110 were later counted as missing. The Americans took 115 of Furutaka's crew as prisoners of war, including her Operations Officer, LtCdr. Shotaro Matsui. Most of these surviving crew were imprisoned at the Featherston prisoner of war camp in New Zealand.

Furutaka was removed from the Navy List on 10 November 1942.

== Wreck ==
The wreck of Furutaka was discovered on 25 February 2019 by the research vessel RV Petrel at a depth of 4,590 ft (1,400 m). The ship rests in two pieces with the bow broken off and lying alongside the rest of the ship. Furutaka's bridge lies some 660 yd (604 m) away from the rest of the wreck.
