= List of weapons of the Imperial Japanese Navy =

This is a list of the weapons of the Imperial Japanese Navy.

== Tanks and armoured vehicles (World War II) ==
=== Tankettes, light and medium tanks ===
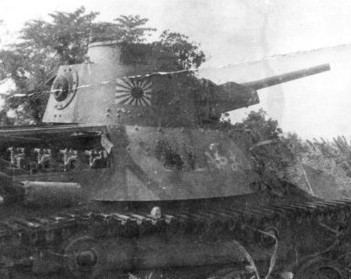
Type 95 Ha-Go light tank of the IJN

- Type Ka Kijusha (a/k/a Type Ka machine gun car) (Carden Loyd tankette)
- Type 92 Jyu-Sokosha tankette
- Type 94 tankette
- Type 97 Te-Ke tankette
- Type 95 Ha-Go light tank
- Type 89A I-Go Kō medium tank
- Type 89B I-Go Otsu medium tank
- Type 97 medium tank
- Type 97 ShinHōtō Chi-Ha medium tank (improved)

=== Amphibious tanks ===
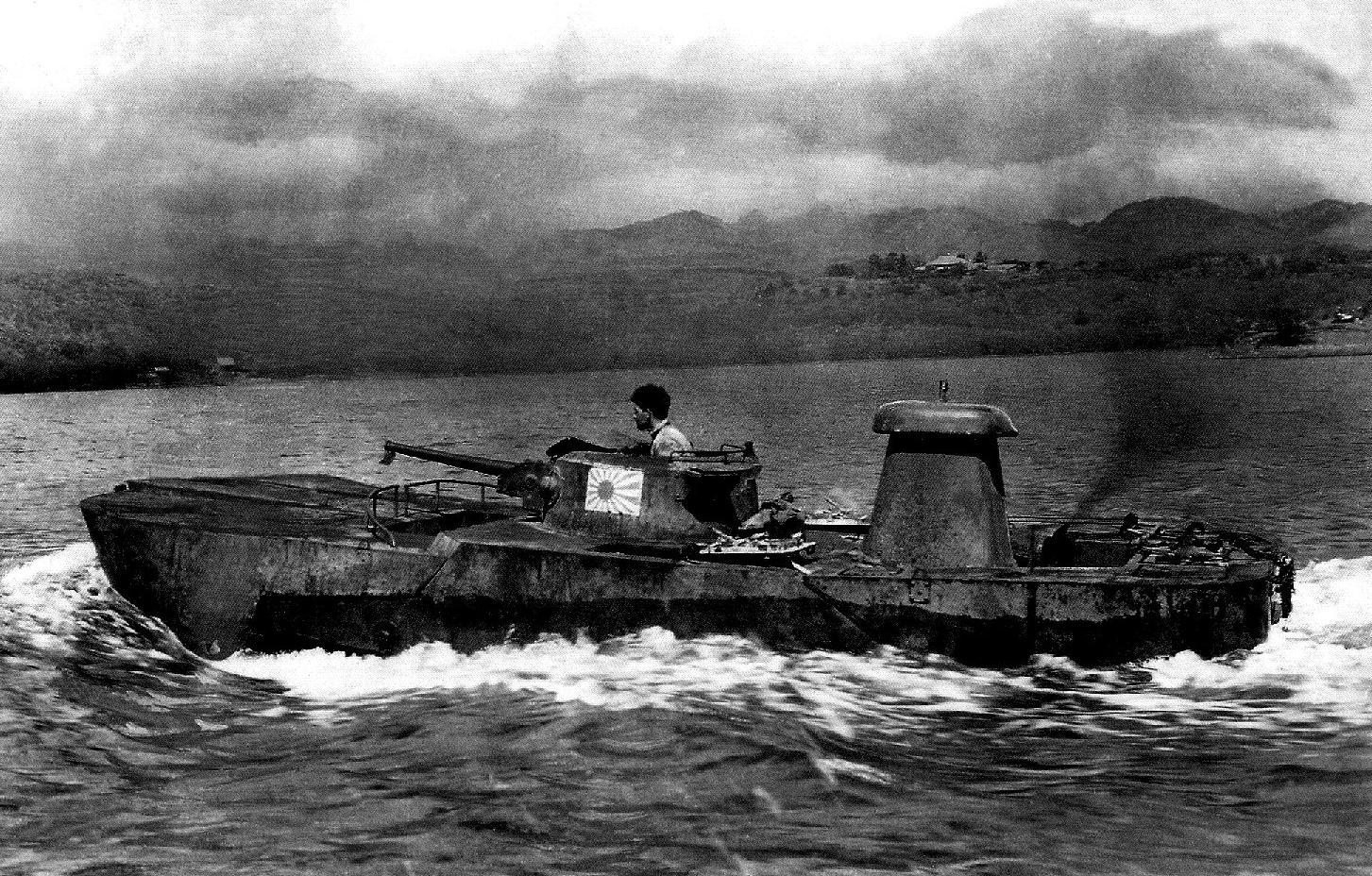
A captured Type 2 Ka-Mi of the IJN undergoing testing

- Type 1 Mi-Sha (a/k/a Type 1 Ka-Mi) (prototype) amphibious tank
- Type 2 Ka-Mi amphibious tank
- Type 3 Ka-Chi amphibious tank
- Type 5 To-Ku (prototype) amphibious tank

=== Amphibious APC ===
- Type 4 Ka-Tsu amphibious APC vehicle

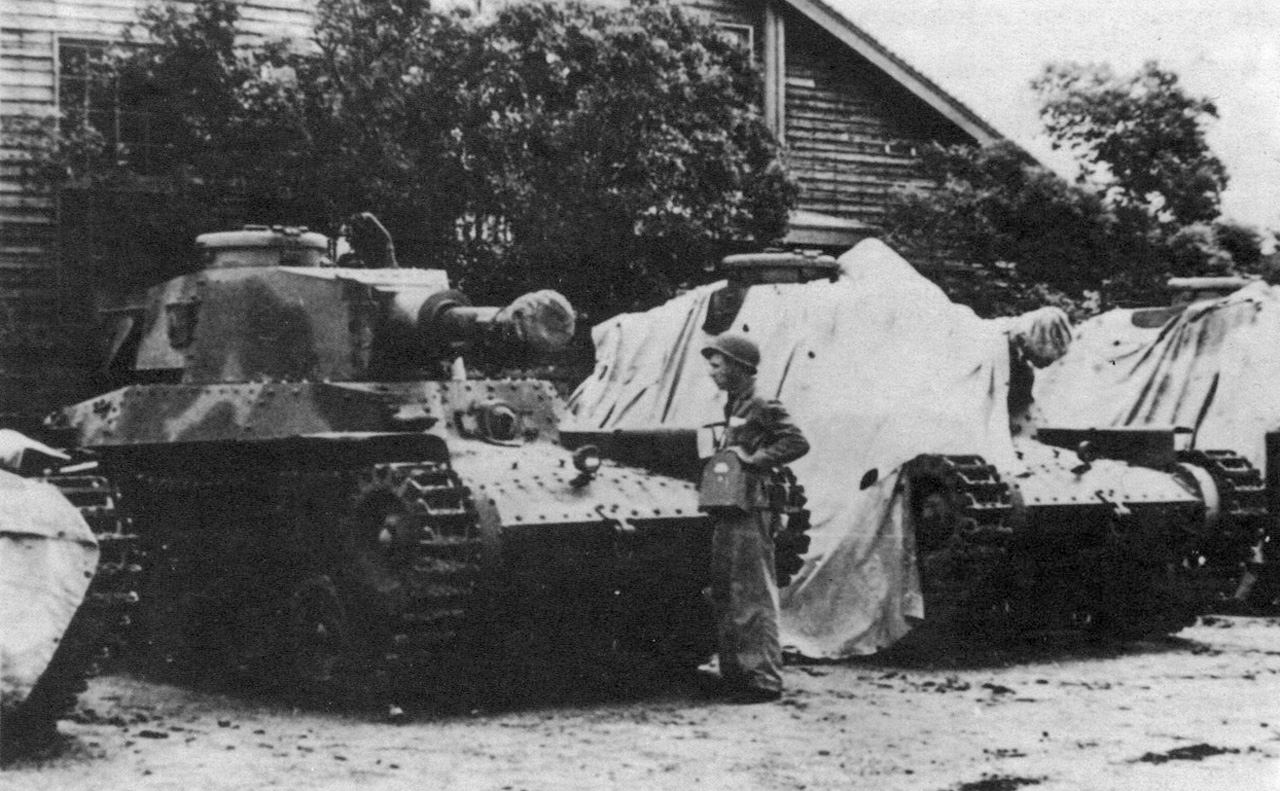
Short barrel 120 mm (4.7 in) gun tanks at the Naval Yard in Sasebo

=== Self-Propelled vehicles ===
- Short barrel 120 mm gun tank
- Long barrel 12 cm SPG (prototype)

=== Armoured cars ===
- Vickers Crossley armoured car
- Sumida Model P armored car
- Type 93 armoured car

=== Cars and trucks ===
- Type 95 mini-truck
- Amphibious truck Su-Ki

== Artillery weapons (World War II) ==
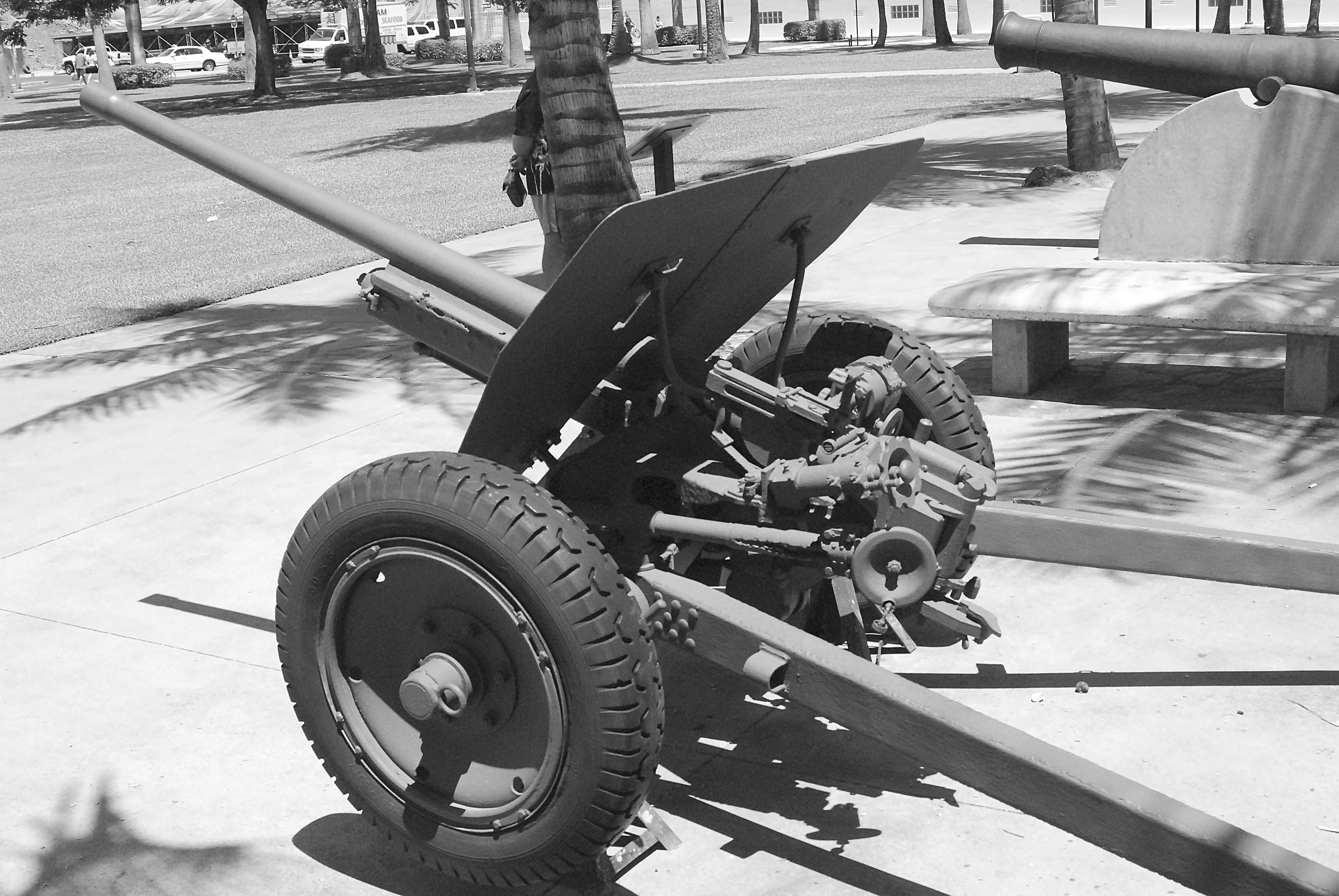
Type 1 47 mm anti-tank gun, rear view

=== Anti tank guns ===
- Type 94 37 mm anti-tank gun
- Type 1 37 mm anti-tank gun
- Type 1 47 mm anti-tank gun

=== Medium anti-aircraft gun ===
- Type 96 25 mm dual purpose anti-tank/anti-aircraft gun
- Vickers Type 40 mm (1.6 in) Dual purpose anti-tank/anti-aircraft gun
- Type 11 75 mm AA gun
- Type 88 75 mm AA gun
- Type 4 75 mm AA gun

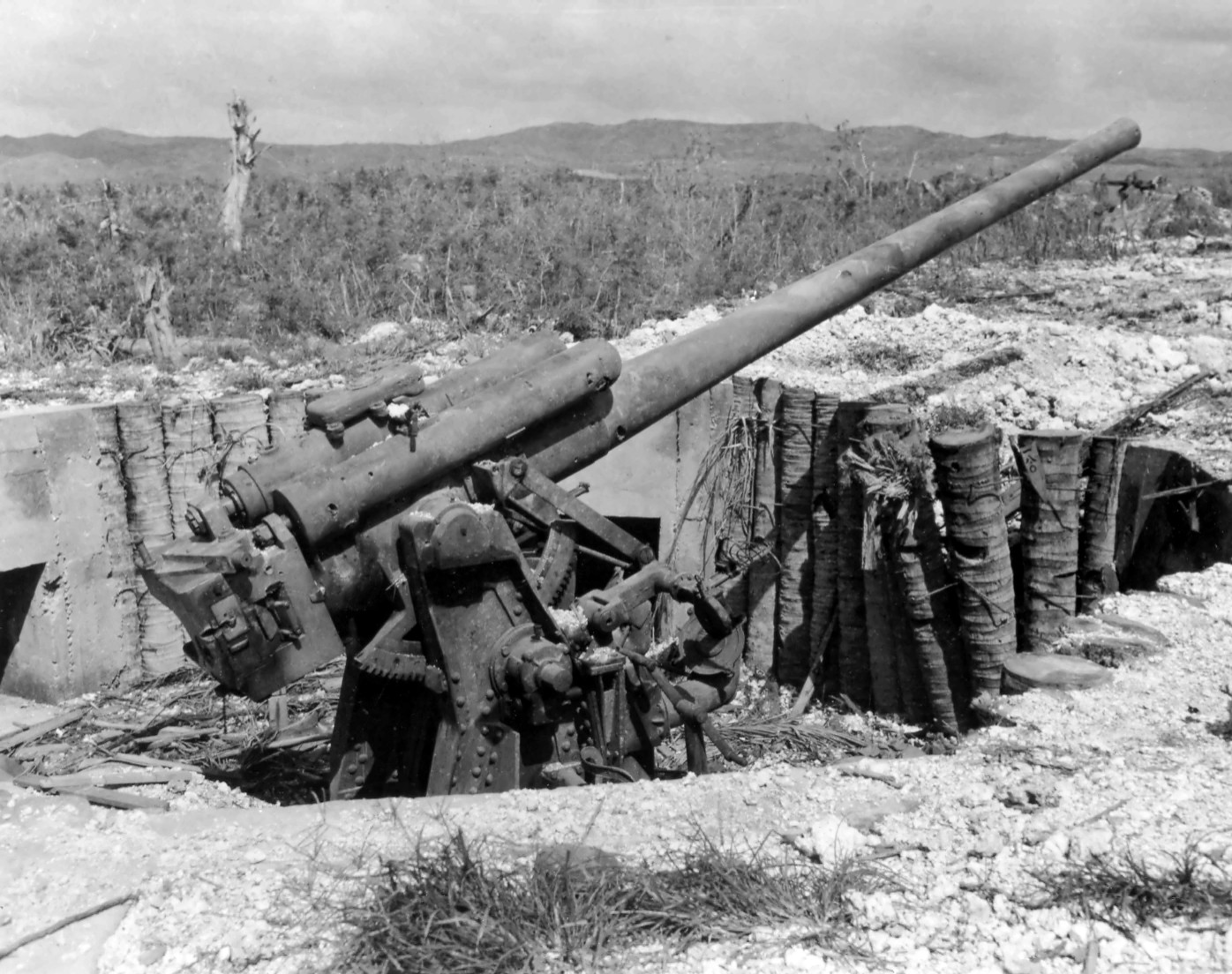
A damaged dual purpose Type 10 120 mm gun

=== Heavy anti-aircraft gun ===
- Type 14 10 cm AA gun
- Type 3 12 cm AA gun
- Type 5 15 cm AA gun (project)
- Type 3 80 mm AA gun
- Type 10 120 mm AA gun

=== Rocket launcher (ground use) ===
- 25 mm (0.98 in) rocket gun launcher
- 80 mm (3.1 in) anti-tank rocket launcher
- 100 mm (3.9 in) anti-tank rocket launcher
- 120 mm (4.7 in) rocket launcher
- 120 mm (4.7 in) six-rocket launcher
- 200 mm (7.9 in) rocket launcher Model 1
- 200 mm (7.9 in) rocket launcher Model 2
- 200 mm (7.9 in) rocket launcher Model 3
- 450 mm (18 in) heavy rocket launcher
- Type 6 ground use bomb projection rocket launcher Model 11
- Type 6 ground use bomb projection rocket launcher Model 13
- Type 3 rocket launcher Model 1
- Type 3 rocket launcher Model 2
- Type 3 rocket launcher Model 2 modification 1

=== Rocket launcher (carrier-based) ===
- 75 mm (3.0 in) blast-off rocket launcher
- 120 mm (4.7 in) rocket launcher (AA)
- 120 mm (4.7 in) 28-rocket launcher (AA)
- 120 mm (4.7 in) 30-rocket launcher (AA)
- 150 mm (5.9 in) rocket depth bomb launcher (ASW)

=== Surface-to-air missiles ===
- Funryu Type 1 radio-guided surface-to-air missile
- Funryu Type 2 radio-guided surface-to-air missile
- Funryu Type 3 radio-guided surface-to-air missile
- Funryu Type 4 radio-guided surface-to-air missile

== Infantry weapons of the Japanese Navy (World War II) ==
=== Rifles ===
- Type 38 rifle
- Type 38 cavalry rifle
- Type 44 cavalry rifle
- Type 97 sniper rifle
- Type 99 rifle
- Type 99 sniper rifle
- Type 'I' rifle
- TERA rifles (Type 100 rifle, Type 1 rifle, Type 2 rifle)

=== Pistols ===
- Type 26 9 mm (0.35 in) revolver
- Type 14 8 mm (0.31 in) Nambu pistol
- Type 94 8 mm (0.31 in) pistol

=== Sub machine guns ===
- Bergmann submachine gun
- Type 100 submachine gun

=== Machine guns ===
- Type 11 light machine gun
- Type 96 light machine gun
- Type 99 light machine gun
- Type 3 heavy machine gun
- Type 92 heavy machine gun
- Type 1 heavy machine gun

=== Infantry mortar ===
- Type 11 70 mm (2.8 in) infantry mortar
- Type 94 90 mm (3.5 in) infantry mortar
- Type 96 150 mm (5.9 in) infantry mortar
- Type 97 81 mm (3.2 in) infantry mortar
- Type 97 90 mm (3.5 in) infantry mortar
- Type 97 150 mm (5.9 in) infantry mortar
- Type 99 81 mm (3.2 in) infantry mortar
- Type 2 120 mm (4.7 in) infantry mortar
- Type 98 50 mm (2.0 in) mortar

=== Grenades and grenade dischargers ===
- Type 10 grenade
- Type 91 grenade
- Type 97 grenade
- [Type 99] grenade
- Ceramic grenade
- Type 10 grenade discharger
- Type 89 grenade discharger
- Rifle grenade discharger

=== Light anti-aircraft weapons ===
- Type 98 20 mm (0.79 in) AA machine cannon
- Type 2 20 mm (0.79 in) AA machine cannon
- Type 4 20 mm (0.79 in) twin AA machine cannon
- Type 4 75 mm (3.0 in) twin AA machine cannon
- AA mine discharger

=== Anti-tank weapons ===
- Type 97 20 mm (0.79 in) AT rifle
- Type 99 AT mine
- Type 2 AT rifle grenade
- Type 3 AT grenade
- Lunge AT mine
- Model 93 pressure anti-tank/personnel mine
- Model 99 magnetic anti-tank mine

=== Flamethrower ===
- Type 100 flamethrower

=== Military sword ===
- Type 98 Shin guntō Military sword

== Aerial bombs (World War II) ==
- Type 3 No.1 28-Go bomb T(Spreading)
- Type 3 No.1 28-Go bomb Type 2 modify 1
- Type 3 No.1 28-Go bomb Type 2 modify 2
- Type 3 No.1 28-Go bomb "Maru-Sen" steel board anti-submarine
- Type 3 No.6 27-Go bomb 1,354 200 58.0 1.2 10.5 500(spreading)
- Type 3 No.25 4-Go bomb Type 1 steel board anti-ground anti-surface
- Type 3 No.50 4-Go bomb steel board anti-ground anti-surface

== Torpedoes (World War II) ==
The following is not an exhaustive list, only covering the principal torpedoes produced in large numbers.

- 6th Year Type 53 cm (21 in) surface-launched torpedo
- 8th Year Type 53 cm (21 in) surface-launched torpedo
- Type 44 45 cm (18 in) surface-launched torpedo
- Type 44 53 cm (21 in) surface-launched torpedo
- Type 89 53 cm (21 in) submarine torpedo
- Type 90 61 cm (24 in) surface-launched torpedo
- Type 91 45 cm (18 in) aircraft-launched torpedo
- Type 92 53 cm (21 in) submarine torpedo
- Type 93 61 cm (24 in) surface-launched torpedo
- Type 95 and Type 96 53 cm (21 in) submarine torpedoes
- Type 97 and Type 98 45 cm (18 in) midget submarine torpedoes
- Type 2 45 cm (18 in) midget submarine torpedo
- Type 4 45 cm (18 in) aircraft-launched torpedo

== Electronic warfare (World War II) ==
=== Land-Based radar ===
- Type 2 Mark 1 Model 1 early warning radar ("11-Go" early warning radar)
- Type 2 Mark 1 Model 1 Modify 1 early warning radar ("11-Go" Model 1 early warning radar)
- Type 2 Mark 1 Model 1 Modify 2 early warning radar ("11-Go" Model 2 early warning radar)
- Type 2 Mark 1 Model 1 Modify 3 early warning radar ("11-Go" Model 3 early warning radar)
- Type 2 Mark 1 Model 2 Mobil early warning radar ("12-Go" Mobil early warning radar)
- Type 2 Mark 1 Model 2 Modify 2 Mobil early warning radar ("12-Go" Modify 2 Mobil early warning radar)
- Type 2 Mark 1 Model 2 Modify 3 Mobil early warning radar ("12-Go" Modify 3 Mobil early warning radar)
- Type 3 Mark 1 Model 1 early warning radar ("11-Go" Modify early warning radar)
- Type 3 Mark 1 Model 3 small size early warning radar ("13-Go" small size early warning radar)
- Type 3 Mark 1 Model 4 long-range air search radar ("14-Go" long-range air search radar)
- Type 2 Mark 4 Model 1 anti-aircraft fire-control radar (Japanese SCR- 268) (S3 anti-aircraft fire-control radar)
- Type 2 Mark 4 Model 2 anti-aircraft fire-control radar (Japanese SCR-268) (S24 anti-aircraft fire-control radar)

=== Airborne radar ===
- Type 3 Air Mark6 Model 4 airborne ship-search radar (H6 airborne ship-search radar)
- N6 airborne ship-search radar
- Type 5 Model 1 radio location night vision device

=== Shipborne radar ===
- Type 2 Mark 2 Model 1 air search radar ("21-Go" air search radar)
- Type 2 Mark 2 Model 2 Modify 3 anti-surface, fire-assisting radar for Submarine ("21-Go" Modify 3 anti-surface, fire-assisting radar)
- Type 2 Mark 2 Model 2 Modify 4 anti-surface, fire-assisting radar for ship ("21-Go" Modify 4 anti-surface, fire-assisting radar)
- Type 2 Mark 3 Model 1 anti-surface fire-control radar ("31-Go" anti-surface fire-control radar)
- Type 2 Mark 3 Model 2 anti-surface fire-control radar ("32-Go" anti-surface fire-control radar)
- Type 2 Mark 3 Model 3 anti-surface fire-control radar ("33-Go" anti-surface fire-control radar)

=== Radar-equipped Bomber devices for maritime reconnaissance/antisubmarine patrol ===
- Mitsubishi G3M3 (Model 23) (Allied codename: "Nell"): This long-range bomber, beginning in 1943, was used as a radar-equipped maritime reconnaissance and electronic warfare aircraft.
- Mitsubishi G4M1 (Model 11/12) "Betty": From 1942, the G4M was also used for the same purposes as the G3M
- Nakajima B5N2 ("Kate")/Nakajima B6N1-2 Tenzan ("Jill"): In 1944, some torpedo bombers of mentioned types used with antisubmarine, radar detection (with finding radar equipment) and similar purposes in short- or medium-range maritime search missions from carriers or land bases.
- Aichi E13A1b ("Jake") Mark 11B:how model 11A, added surface-search radar and other night conversion with radar (E13A1b-S)
- Kawanishi H6K2,4, and 5 "Mavis" Marks 11, 22, and 23: more powerful engines, for ultra long range missions, long range sea radio equipment and surface-search radar added.
- Kawanishi H8K2 ("Emily") Mark 12:More potent engines for ultra-long range maritime recon missions, major heavy armament; also long range sea radio equipment and air-surface search radar added.
- Kawanishi E7K2 ("Alf") Mark 2: short range seaplane, fitted with magnetic anomaly detection equipment and surface-search radar for short range patrol and antisubmarine missions.
- Kyushu Q3W1 Nankai (South Sea): two place version of training aircraft Kyushu K11W1 Shiragiku, for antisubmarine patrol. Equipped with sea-surface finding antisubmarine sonar (one prototype)
- Kyushu Q1W1 Tokai (Eastern Sea; "Lorna"): Antisubmarine patrol aircraft. Equipped with surface-search radar and antisubmarine equipment for escorting convoys in the East China Sea, the Yellow Sea and the Sea of Japan during short periods in 1944-45.
- Mitsubishi Q2M Taiyo: advanced antisubmarine patrol design, derived from Mitsubishi Ki-67 Hiryu ("Peggy"). Was equipped with magnetic antisubmarine search device, air-surface radar and electronic antennae warfare. This design did not advance past the design stage during the war.

== Special weapons (World War II) ==
- I-400 class submarine (special submarine aircraft carrier)
  - Aichi M6A "Seiran" special seaplane bomber (submarine-born)

=== Tokkotai ===
Japanese Special Attack Units (特別攻撃隊, tokubetsu kōgeki tai, often abbreviated to 特攻隊, tokkōtai) were a category which comprised both ad-hoc and specially designed guided weapons, most of them involving the use of a suicide pilot. The term "Special Attack" (特別攻撃, tokubetsu kōgeki) was widely understood to refer to a suicide attack. For example, the fleet sortie during Operation Ten-Ichi-Go was also referred to as Tokko Yamato Kantai (The Special Attack Fleet Yamato).

- "Kamikaze" manned suicide flying bomb (repurposed conventional aircraft)
- "Tohka" manned suicide flying bomb
- "Ohka" manned suicide flying bomb
- "Kaiten" manned suicide torpedo
- "Shinyo" manned bomb motorboat
- "Fukuryu" frogman
