= Imperial Japanese Navy Technical Department =

Operating division of the Ministry of the Navy of Japan

The Imperial Japanese Navy Technical Department (艦政本部, kansei honbu; Short form: 艦本 kampon / Kanhon) was the externally operating division of the Ministry of the Navy of Japan responsible for the administration of naval vessel construction. From 1923 onward, it took on the role of a research institution for the research and development of naval technologies and engineering. This included studying and investigating existing western naval technology, developing and overseeing Japan's domestic shipbuilding and arms industries, and training officers to become naval engineers and inspectors. The bureau was dismantled along with the naval ministry in November 1945 after Japan surrendered to the Allies at the end of World War II.

== Taishō period weapons ==
The Department developed various weapons during the Taishō period. These were known a "Xth Year Type" weapons, with the year being the year of the Taishō Emperor's reign (dating from 30 July 1912 - 25 December 1926).

This nomenclature followed on from Meiji period - the Meiji Emperor's reign (13 February 1867 - 30 July 1912). Records exist of a "8.0 inch 45 caliber, 41st Year Type" (1908).

=== 3rd Year Type Guns (1914) ===
- 410-millimetre (16 in) 41 cm/45 3rd Year Type naval gun
- 200-millimetre (7.9 in) 20 cm/50 3rd Year Type naval gun (I)
- 8-inch (203.2 mm) 20 cm/50 3rd Year Type naval gun (II)
- 155-millimetre (6.1 in) 15.5 cm/60 3rd Year Type naval gun
- 140-millimetre (5.5 in) 14 cm/50 3rd Year Type naval gun
- 5-inch (130 mm) 12.7 cm/50 3rd Year Type naval gun
- 4.7-inch (120 mm) 12cm/45 3rd Year Type naval gun

(Note: "3rd Year" refers to these weapons Welin breech block, which was introduced in 1914; the weapons themselves often came later)

=== 5th Year Type Gun (1916) ===
480-millimetre (19 in) 48 cm/45 5th Year Type naval gun

=== 6th Year Type Torpedo (1917) ===
The 6th Year Type torpedo

- Diameter : 21 inches (533 mm)
- Length : 22 ft 5 in (6.8 m)
- Weight :3,157 lb (1,432 kg)
- Explosive charge: 441 lb (200 kg)
- Range :
  - 7,000 m (7,700 yd) at 36 kn (67 km/h; 41 mph)
  - 10,000 m (11,000 yd) at 32 kn (59 km/h; 37 mph)
  - 15,000 m (16,000 yd) at 26 kn (48 km/h; 30 mph).

It was widely used in surface ships and submarines into World War II:

- Ōtori class torpedo boats
- Type B1 submarines
- Type L3 and L4 submarines
- Kaidai class submarines
- Kaichū type submarines
- Momi class destroyers
- Wakatake class destroyers

=== 8th Year Type Torpedo (1919) ===
The 8th Year Type torpedo:

- Diameter: 610 millimetres (24 in)
- Length: 27 ft 7 in (8.4 m)
- Weight: 5,207 lb (2,362 kg)
- Explosive charge: 761 lb (345 kg)
- Range:
  - 10,000 m (11,000 yd) at 38 kn (70 km/h; 44 mph)
  - 15,000 m (16,000 yd) at 32 kn (59 km/h; 37 mph)
  - 20,000 m (22,000 yd) at 28 kn (52 km/h; 32 mph).

An advance on its predecessor, it was used in:

- Mutsuki class destroyers
- Fubuki-class destroyers
- Hatsuharu-class destroyers
- Nagara-class cruisers
- Some heavy cruisers

=== 9th Year Type Mine (1920) ===
The 9th Year Type mine was deployed from various ships.

It was used as a test explosive on the hulk of Tosa.

=== 11th Year Type Guns (1922) ===
The 11th Year Type breech was a horizontal-sliding block breech type, adopted in 1922. It was used in the 4.7in Type 3 120 mm 45 caliber naval gun and the 5.5in 14 cm/40 11th Year Type naval gun, which was the standard Japanese submarine deck gun.

11th Year Type Guns were mounted on the following ships:

- Ōtori class torpedo boats
- Kaidai-type submarines
- Type B submarines
- Type C submarines
