= Japanese destroyer Yamagumo =

At least two warships of Japan have been named Yamagumo:

- Japanese destroyer Yamagumo (1937), an Asashio-class destroyer launched in 1937 and sunk in 1944
- JDS Yamagumo, a Yamagumo-class destroyer launched in 1965 and struck in 1995
