= USS Quincy (CA-39) =

New Orleans class heavy cruiser

Coordinates: 9°4′32″S 159°58′30″E

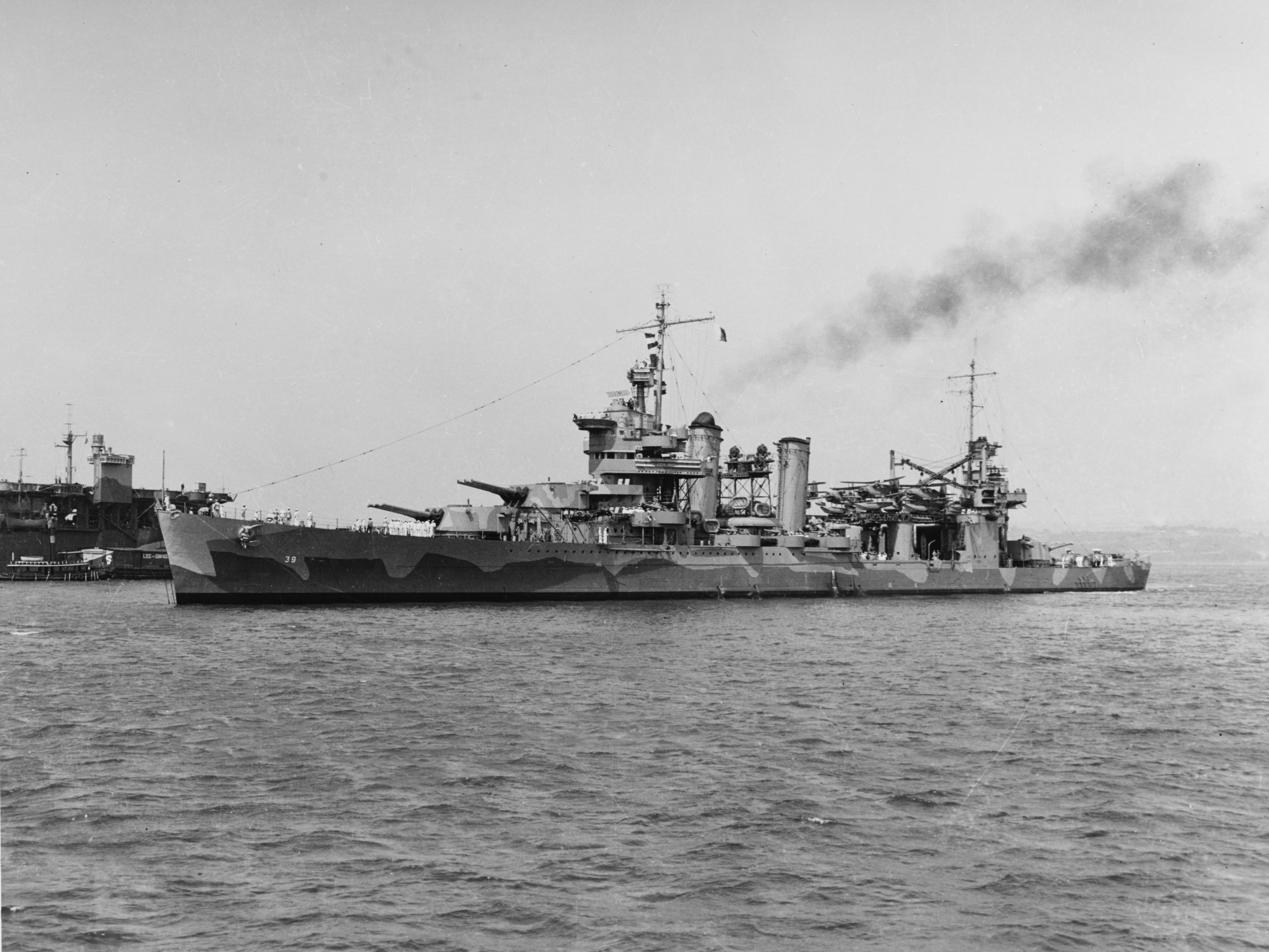
- USS Quincy (CA-39) in New York harbour on 23 May 1942

History

United States
- Name: Quincy
- Namesake: City of Quincy, Massachusetts
- Ordered: 13 February 1929
- Awarded: 9 January 1933
- Builder: Bethlehem Shipbuilding Corporation's Fore River Shipyard, Quincy, Massachusetts
- Cost: $8,196,000 (contract price)
- Laid down: 15 November 1933
- Launched: 19 June 1935
- Sponsored by: Mrs. Henry S. Morgan
- Commissioned: 9 June 1936
- Identification: Hull symbol: CA-39
- Honors and awards: 1 × battle stars
- Fate: Sunk, Battle of Savo Island 9 August 1942

General characteristics (as built)
- Class & type: New Orleans-class cruiser
- Displacement: 10,136 long tons (10,299 t) (standard); 12,463 long tons (12,663 t) (loaded)
- Length: 588 ft (179 m) oa; 575 ft (175.3 m) pp
- Beam: 61 ft 10 in (18.85 m)
- Draft: 19 ft 6 in (5.94 m) (mean); 23 ft 6 in (7.16 m) (max)
- Installed power: 8 × Babcock & Wilcox boilers; 107,000 shp (80,000 kW)
- Propulsion: 4 × Parsons reduction steam turbines; 4 × screws
- Speed: 32.7 kn (37.6 mph; 60.6 km/h)
- Range: 10,000 nmi (12,000 mi; 19,000 km) at 15 kn (17 mph; 28 km/h)
- Capacity: Fuel oil: 1,650 tons
- Complement: 103 officers 763 enlisted
- Armament: 9 × 8 inches (203 mm)/55 caliber guns (3x3); 8 × 5 in (127 mm)/25 caliber anti-aircraft guns; 2 × 3-pounder 47 mm (1.9 in) saluting guns; 8 × caliber 0.50 in (12.7 mm) machine guns
- Armor: Belt: 3–5 in (76–127 mm); Deck: 1 1/4–2 1/4 in (32–57 mm); Barbettes: 5 in (130 mm); Turrets: 1 1/2–8 in (38–203 mm); Conning Tower: 5 in (130 mm)
- Aircraft carried: 4 × floatplanes
- Aviation facilities: 2 × Amidship catapults

General characteristics (1942)
- Armament: 9 × 8 in (200 mm)/55 caliber guns (3x3); 8 × 5 in (130 mm)/25 caliber anti-aircraft guns; 2 × 3-pounder 47 mm (1.9 in) saluting guns; 12 × single 20 mm (0.79 in) Oerlikon anti-aircraft cannons; 4 × quad 1.1 in (28 mm)/75 caliber anti-aircraft guns

USS Quincy (CL/CA-39) was a United States Navy New Orleans-class cruiser, sunk at the Battle of Savo Island in 1942.

== Construction ==
Quincy, the second ship to carry the name, was laid down by Bethlehem Shipbuilding Corporation's Fore River Shipyard in Quincy, Massachusetts, on 15 November 1933, launched on 19 June 1935, sponsored by Mrs. Catherine Adams-Morgan, wife of Henry S. Morgan, and commissioned at Boston, on 9 June 1936, Captain William Faulkner Amsden in command.

The New Orleans-class cruisers were the last US cruisers built to the specifications and standards of the Washington Naval Treaty of 1922. Such ships, with a limit of 10,000 tons standard displacement and 8-inch caliber main guns, may be referred to as "treaty cruisers." Originally classified a light cruiser when she was authorized, because of her thin armor, she was reclassified a heavy cruiser, because of her 8-inch guns. The term "heavy cruiser" was not defined until the London Naval Treaty in 1930. This ship and Vincennes were a slightly improved version of the New Orleans-class design.

== Inter-war period ==
Soon after being assigned to Cruiser Division 8 (CruDiv8), Atlantic Fleet, Quincy was ordered to Mediterranean waters on 20 July 1936, to protect American interests in Spain during the height of the Spanish Civil War. Quincy passed through the Straits of Gibraltar on 26 July and arrived at Málaga, Spain on 27 July to assume her duties. While in Spanish waters, she operated with an international rescue fleet that included Deutschland, Admiral Graf Spee, and Admiral Scheer. Quincy evacuated 490 refugees to Marseille and Villefranche, France, before being relieved by Raleigh on 27 September.

Quincy returned to the Boston Navy Yard on 5 October for refit preparatory to final acceptance trials which were held from 15–18 March 1937. She got underway for the Pacific on 12 April to join CruDiv 7, transited the Panama Canal from 23–27 April and arrived at Pearl Harbor on 10 May.

Quincy sortied with Cruiser Divisions, Pacific Fleet on 20 May on a tactical exercise which was the first of many such maneuvers that she participated in during 1937–1938. From 15 March to 28 April, she engaged in important battle practice off Hawaii with the Pacific Fleet in Fleet Problem XIX. After an overhaul at Mare Island Navy Yard, Quincy resumed tactical operations with her division off San Clemente, California, until her redeployment to the Atlantic on 4 January 1939.

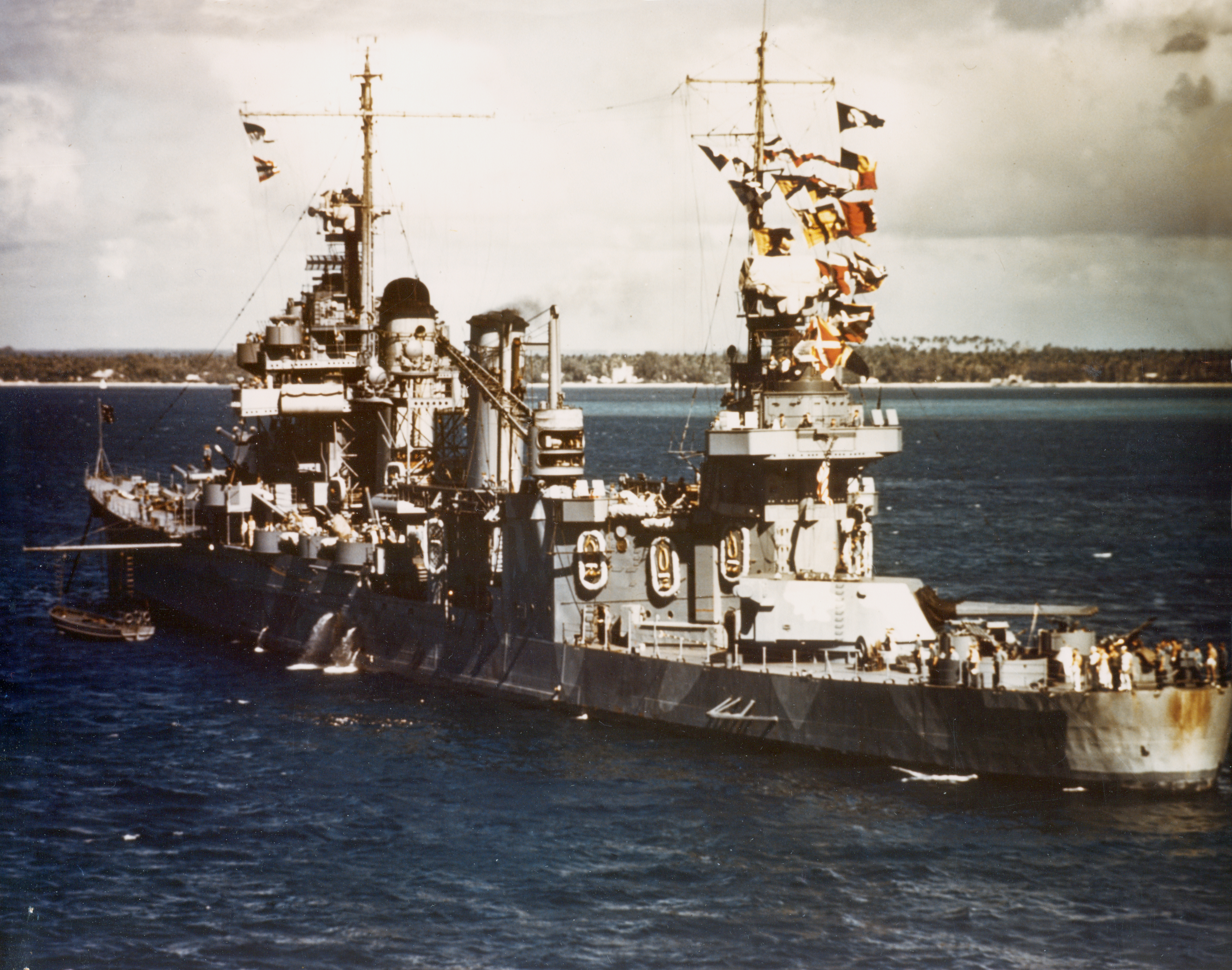
Quincy anchored at New Caledonia on 3 August 1942.

Quincy transited the Panama Canal on 13 January bound for Guantanamo Bay where she engaged in gunnery practice and amphibious exercises. She also took part in Fleet Problem XX with the Atlantic Fleet from 13–26 February. Quincy later made a South American goodwill tour from 10 April to 12 June, and upon returning to Norfolk, embarked reservists for three training cruises from 9 July to 24 August. She spent the remainder of 1939 on patrol in the North Atlantic due to the outbreak of World War II.

After overhaul at Norfolk until 4 May 1940, Quincy again visited Brazil, Uruguay and Argentina, returning to Norfolk on 22 September. She completed three more reserve training cruises from 1 October to 20 December.

Quincy was occupied in Atlantic Fleet maneuvers and landing force exercises off Culebra Island, Puerto Rico from 3 February to 1 April 1941. With the growth of hostilities in Europe, she was ordered to Task Force 2 (TF 2) and operated with Wasp in the mid-Atlantic, preserving US neutrality from 26 April to 6 June. Later, she operated with Yorktown and TF 28 until sailing for home on 14 July.

== World War II ==
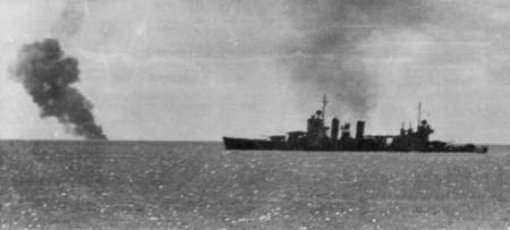
Quincy fighting off air attacks at Guadalcanal.

On 28 July, Quincy sailed with TF 16 for Iceland on neutrality duty which included a patrol in the Denmark Straits from 21–24 September. She returned to Newfoundland with a convoy on 31 October. Quincy then proceeded to Cape Town, South Africa, via Trinidad, where she met a convoy which she escorted back to Trinidad on 29 December.

Quincy returned on 25 January 1942 to Icelandic waters on convoy duty with TF 15 and made a patrol in the Denmark Straits from 8–11 March. She departed on 14 March for the United States and an overhaul at the New York Navy Yard that lasted until the end of May.

Quincy sailed for San Diego on 5 June via the Panama Canal and arrived on 19 June. She was then assigned to TF 18 as the flagship of Rear Admiral Norman R. Scott, Commander, Cruisers.

Quincy got underway for the South Pacific in July with other vessels assembling for the invasion of Guadalcanal.

Prior to the Marine assault on Guadalcanal on 7 August, Quincy destroyed several Japanese installations and an oil depot during her bombardment of Lunga Point. She later provided close fire support for the Marines during the landing.

=== Loss at the Battle of Savo Island ===
While on patrol in the channel between Florida Island and Savo Island, in the early hours of 9 August, Quincy was attacked by a large Japanese naval force during the Battle of Savo Island.

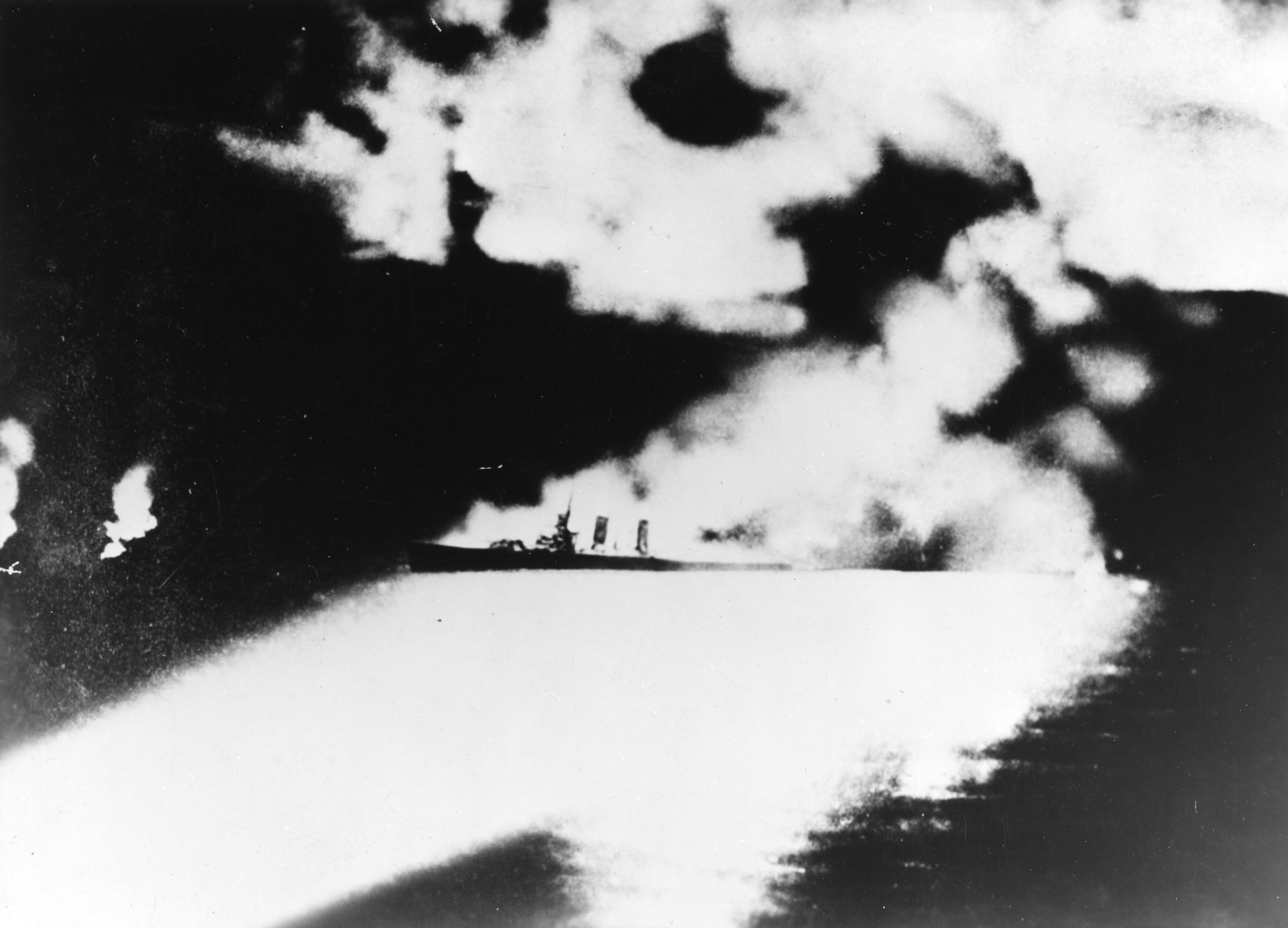
Quincy caught in Japanese searchlights, moments before sinking off Savo Island with great loss of life, on 9 August 1942

Quincy, along with sister ships USS Astoria (CA-34) and USS Vincennes (CA-44), had seen aircraft flares dropped over other ships in the task force, and had just sounded general quarters and was coming alert when the searchlights from the Japanese column came on. Quincy's captain, Samuel N. Moore, gave the order to commence firing, but the gun crews were not ready. Within a few minutes, Quincy was caught in a crossfire between Aoba, Furutaka, and Tenryū, and was hit heavily and set afire. Quincy's captain ordered his cruiser to charge towards the eastern Japanese column, but as she turned to do so Quincy was hit by two torpedoes from Tenryū, causing severe damage. Quincy managed to fire a few main gun salvos, one of which hit Chōkai's chart room 6 meters (20 ft) from Admiral Mikawa and killed or wounded 36 men, although Mikawa was not injured. At 02:10, incoming shells killed or wounded almost all of Quincy's bridge crew, including the captain. At 02:16, the cruiser was hit by a torpedo from Aoba, and the ship's remaining guns were silenced. Quincy's assistant gunnery officer, sent to the bridge to ask for instructions, reported on what he found:

"When I reached the bridge level, I found it a shambles of dead bodies with only three or four people still standing. In the Pilot House itself the only person standing was the signalman at the wheel who was vainly endeavoring to check the ship's swing to starboard to bring her to port. On questioning him I found out that the Captain, who at that time was laying [sic] near the wheel, had instructed him to beach the ship and he was trying to head for Savo Island, distant some four miles (6 km) on the port quarter. I stepped to the port side of the Pilot House, and looked out to find the island and noted that the ship was heeling rapidly to port, sinking by the bow. At that instant the Captain straightened up and fell back, apparently dead, without having uttered any sound other than a moan."

Quincy sustained many direct hits which left 370 men dead and 167 wounded. She sank, bow first, at 02:38, being the first ship sunk in the area which was later known as Ironbottom Sound.

=== Rediscovery ===
Quincy's wreck was discovered and explored by Robert Ballard and his crew in July and August 1992. Quincy sits upright in roughly 2,000 feet (610 m) of water. Her bow is missing forward of her number 1 turret, both forward turrets are trained to starboard, with turret 1 featuring a jammed gun, and one of turret 2's guns burst. Of the superstructure, the bridge is heavily damaged but intact, both funnels are missing, and the float plane hangar completely collapsed. Quincy's stern is bent upwards aft of the number 3 turret, and heavily damaged by implosions.

== Awards ==
Quincy earned one battle star during World War II.

== See also ==
- List of U.S. Navy losses in World War II
