= 8th Year Type torpedo =

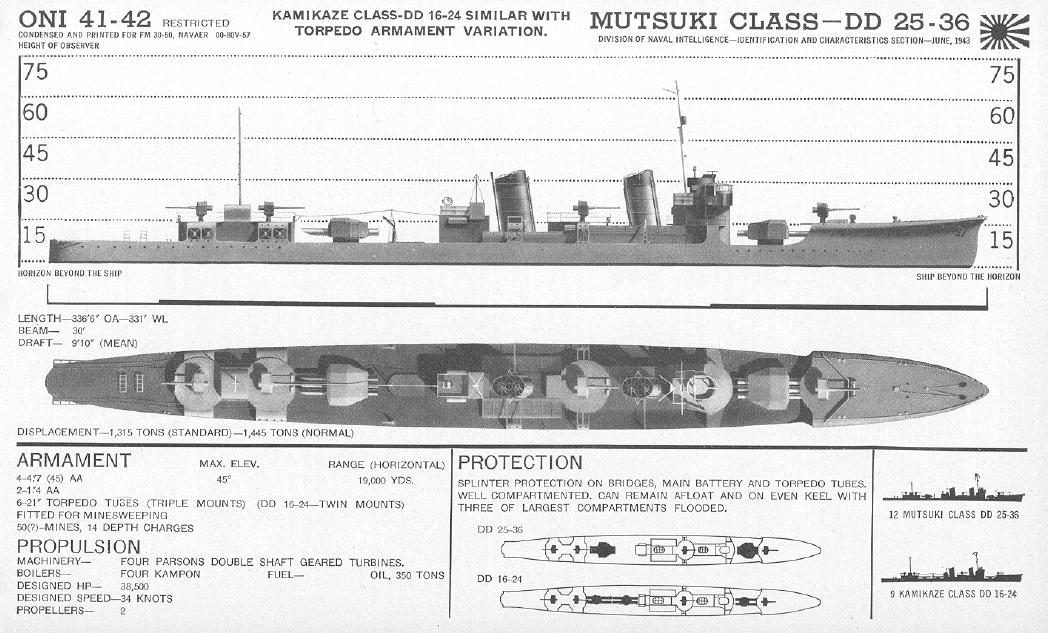
- The Mutsuki class were the first ships equipping this torpedo
- Type: Torpedo
- Place of origin: Empire of Japan

Service history
- In service: 1920
- Used by: Imperial Japanese Navy
- Wars: Second World War

Production history
- Designed: 1919
- Manufacturer: Kure, Yokosuka and Sasebo Naval Arsenals

Specifications
- Mass: 2,215 kg (4,883 lb) (N° 1); 2,362 kg (5,207 lb) (N° 2)
- Length: 8.485 m (27 ft 10.1 in)
- Diameter: 60.9 cm (24.0 in)
- Effective firing range: 10,000 m (11,000 yd) (at 38 knots)
- Maximum firing range: 20,000 m (22,000 yd) (at 28 knots)
- Warhead: Shimose (picric acid)
- Warhead weight: 300 kg (660 lb) (N° 1); 346 kg (763 lb) (N° 2)
- Engine: 4-cylinder Schwarzkopff radial engine
- Maximum speed: 43 knots (80 km/h)

The "8th Year Type" (十二年式) was a 61 cm (24 in)-diameter torpedo of the Imperial Japanese Navy, launched from surface ships. It was later used as the template to develop the more advanced Type 90 torpedo. It was further derivatived in two variations, "Number 1" and "Number 2", having respectively a lighter and larger warheads.

== History and development ==
The Imperial Japanese Navy (IJN) initially used 53.3 cm (21.0 in)-diameter torpedoes like most other navies during this period, making the 8th Year Type the first-ever 61 cm (24 in)-diameter torpedo put in service (exactly 609 mm (24.0 in)). It was initially deployed for the Mutsuki-class destroyers and was also adopted for the newer Fubuki-class destroyers as well as several cruisers for their refits such as the Nagara class, 61 cm (24 in)-diameter torpedoes being the only standards for future ships until the end of World War II.

Hatsuharu-class destroyer and heavy cruiser remodels were also fitted with 61 cm (24 in)-diameter torpedo launcher, but all ships equipped with those launchers were now using the newly developed Type 90 torpedo, which was also progressively replacing all 8th Year Type torpedoes in IJN service, now obsolete.

The torpedo used a four-cylinder Schwarzkopff radial engine, with a wet-heater using kerosene and compressed air. They were launched from the torpedo tubes, in either a three or four tubed-closed launcher configurations. This system was notably improved with the following Type 90 torpedo, replacing the propulsion and improving the launching mechanism.

== See also ==
- List of weapons of the Japanese Navy
