= 61 cm Type 90 torpedo =

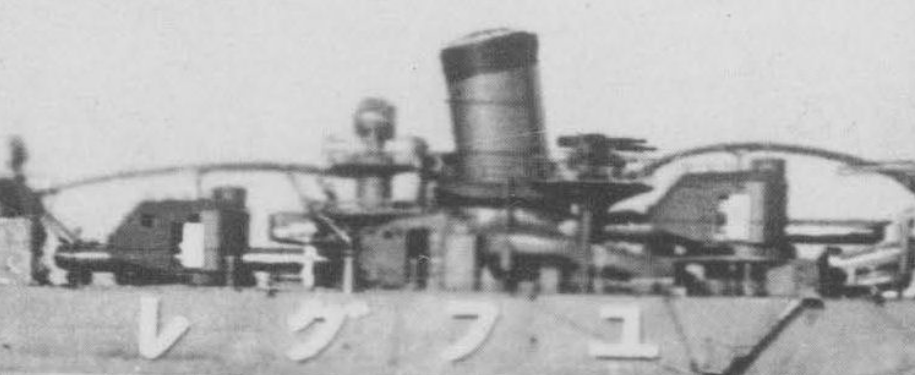
- Triple 61 cm torpedo launchers on the Yūgure
- Type: Torpedo
- Place of origin: Empire of Japan

Service history
- In service: 1933–1945
- Used by: Imperial Japanese Navy
- Wars: Second World War

Production history
- Designed: 1928–1932
- Manufacturer: Kure, Yokosuka and Sasebo Naval Arsenals

Specifications
- Mass: 2.54 tonnes (2.50 long tons; 2.80 short tons)
- Length: 8.485 m (27 ft 10.1 in)
- Diameter: 60.9 cm (24.0 in)
- Effective firing range: 7,000 m (7,700 yd) (at 46 knots)
- Maximum firing range: 15,000 m (16,000 yd) (at 35 knots)
- Warhead: Type 97 (60% TNT, 40% HND)
- Warhead weight: 400 kg (880 lb)
- Engine: 2-cylinder double-action
- Maximum speed: 46 knots (85 km/h)

The Type 90 Pneumatic Torpedo (九〇式空気式魚雷, designated for Imperial Japanese calendar year 2590) was a 61 cm (24 in)-diameter surface-fired torpedo used by the Imperial Japanese Navy during World War II. It was notably first used in the Hatsuharu-class destroyers and in most cruisers, including the Furutaka, Aoba, Myoko, Takao, and Mogami-class heavy cruisers after refits during the 1930s. It is an evolution of the 8th Year Type torpedo and was superseded by the Type 93 oxygen torpedo, commonly called the Long Lance, as oxygen generating equipment was installed aboard surface ships.

== Development ==
The torpedo was based on a newly developed British 46-knot (85 km/h) 21-inch (53 cm) Whitehead torpedo. This weapon used a new double-action two-cylinder engine rather than the four-cylinder radial engine used by World War I-era British torpedoes. It was significantly faster (8–10 knots (15–19 km/h)), although it had a much shorter range (only 10,000 m (11,000 yd)) than the Japanese 6th and 8th Year torpedoes. Twenty of these were bought with training warheads in 1926 for ¥30,000 each; the British allowed Japanese technicians to observe the manufacturing process and launch trials. Japan bought a manufacturing license in 1928 for ¥150,000.

The Japanese did not actually manufacture any of these torpedoes, but combined their technology with the results of independent Japanese research to produce the 61 cm Type 90. Testing of the prototypes was prolonged by the need to correct a number of design errors and manufacturing defects, but two prototypes were turned over to the Underwater School in 1931 for practical use. It was informally adopted for use in 1932, but not officially accepted until 15 November 1933. Production initially began at the Kure Naval Arsenal, but the Yokosuka and Sasebo Naval Arsenals began production later.

== Description ==
The Type 90 had an actual diameter of 60.9 cm (24.0 in), weighed 2.54 tonnes (2.50 long tons; 2.80 short tons) and was 8.485 m (27 ft 10.1 in) long. It was very fast for the period and had an endurance of 7,000 m (7,700 yd) at 46 knots (85 km/h); 10,000 m (11,000 yd) at 42 knots (78 km/h); and 15,000 m (16,000 yd) at 35 knots (65 km/h). It was a wet-heater design and mixed kerosene with compressed air to further expand the air used to power the two-cylinder engine. The engine was cooled by saltwater and the resulting steam was recycled for use by the engine. Its warhead weighed 400 kg (880 lb), its air chamber was pressurized at 220 bars (3,200 psi). It was pneumatically launched from the torpedo tubes, in either a three or four tubes closed launchers configurations.

== Service history ==
Despite the invention of the more modern and famous type 93 "long lance" torpedo, they were only introduced for the Shiratsuyu class destroyers and following designs, and the Mutsuki, Fubuki, Akatsuki, and Hatsuharu class destroyers were still loaded with type 90 torpedoes between the start of the war to mid 1943, and thus the torpedo saw some good use during the first year of the war.

List of ships sunk or damaged by type 90 torpedoes

HMAS Perth: Australian light cruiser sunk partly by torpedoes from the destroyers Murakumo and Shirakumo, battle of Sunda Strait, 1 March 1942

USS Houston: A crippled American heavy cruiser finished off by a torpedo from the destroyer Shikinami, battle of Sunda Strait, 1 March 1942

HMS Exeter: An already sinking British heavy cruiser hit by torpedoes from the destroyer Inazuma, battle of the Java Sea, 1 March 1942

SS Dardanus; British passenger ship sunk partly by torpedoes from the destroyer Amagiri, Indian Ocean Raid, 6 April 1942

SS Gandara: British steamship sunk partly by torpedoes from Amagiri, Indian Ocean Raid, 6 April 1942

USS Vincennes: American heavy cruiser sunk partly by a torpedo from the light cruiser Yūbari, battle of Savo Island, 9 August 1942

USS Atlanta: American light cruiser sunk primarily by a torpedo from the destroyer Ikazuchi, naval battle of Guadalcanal, 13 November 1942

USS Portland: American heavy cruiser badly damaged by a torpedo from the Inazuma, naval battle of Guadalcanal, 13 November 1942

USS Preston: American destroyer sunk partly by a torpedo from the destroyer Ayanami, naval battle of Guadalcanal, 15 November 1942

USS Benham: American destroyer sunk by a torpedo, possibly from the destroyer Shirayuki, naval battle of Guadalcanal, 15 November 1942

== Readings ==
- Campbell, John (2002). Naval Weapons of World War Two. London: Conway Maritime Press. ISBN 0-87021-459-4.
- Lengerer, Hans (2007). The Japanese Destroyers of the Hatsuharu Class. Warship 2007. London: Conway. pp. 91–110. ISBN 978-1-84486-041-8.OCLC 77257764
- Masataka Chiyaka; Yasuo Abe (1972). Warship Profile 22; IJN Yukikaze/Destroyer/1939-1970. Profile Publications Ltd.
- O'Hara, Vincent (2009). Struggle for the Middle Sea: The Great Navies at War in the Mediterranean Theater, 1940–1945. Annapolis, Maryland: Naval Institute Press. ISBN 978-1-59114-648-3.
- Hornfischer, James D. (2011). Neptune's Inferno: The U.S. Navy at Guadalcanal. New York: Bantam Books. ISBN 978-0-553-80670-0.
