= Savo Island order of battle =

IJN and Allied commanders

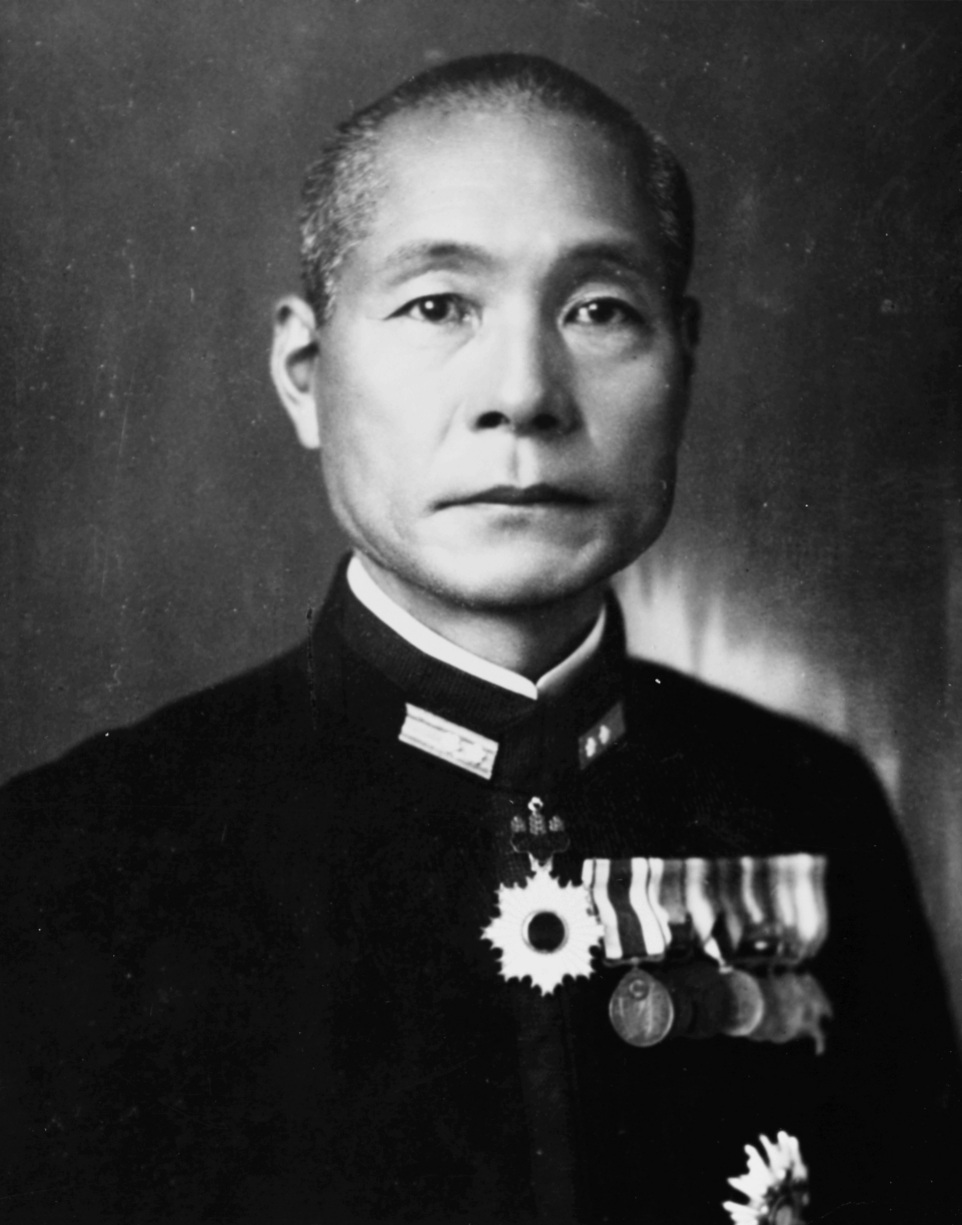
Vice Adm. Gunichi Mikawa

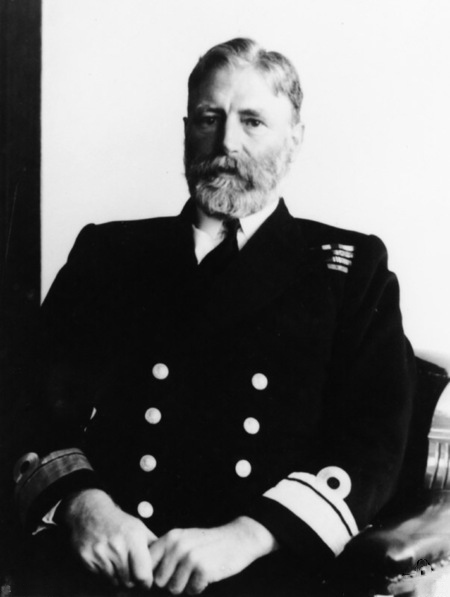
Rear Adm. Victor Crutchley

The Battle of Savo Island was part of Guadalcanal Campaign and was fought on 9 August 1942 in the waters around Savo Island by forces of the Imperial Japanese Navy (IJN) and Allies' Guadalcanal—Tulagi invasion force composed of ships from the United States Navy (USN) and Royal Australian Navy (RAN). The battle resulted in a major Allied defeat, losing four heavy cruisers. The Japanese lost no ships but failed to capitalize on the temporary strategic advantage gained from the battle, leaving the unprotected Allied transports unharmed.

Because the Japanese had the tactical initiative, their forces are listed first.

== Japanese order of battle ==
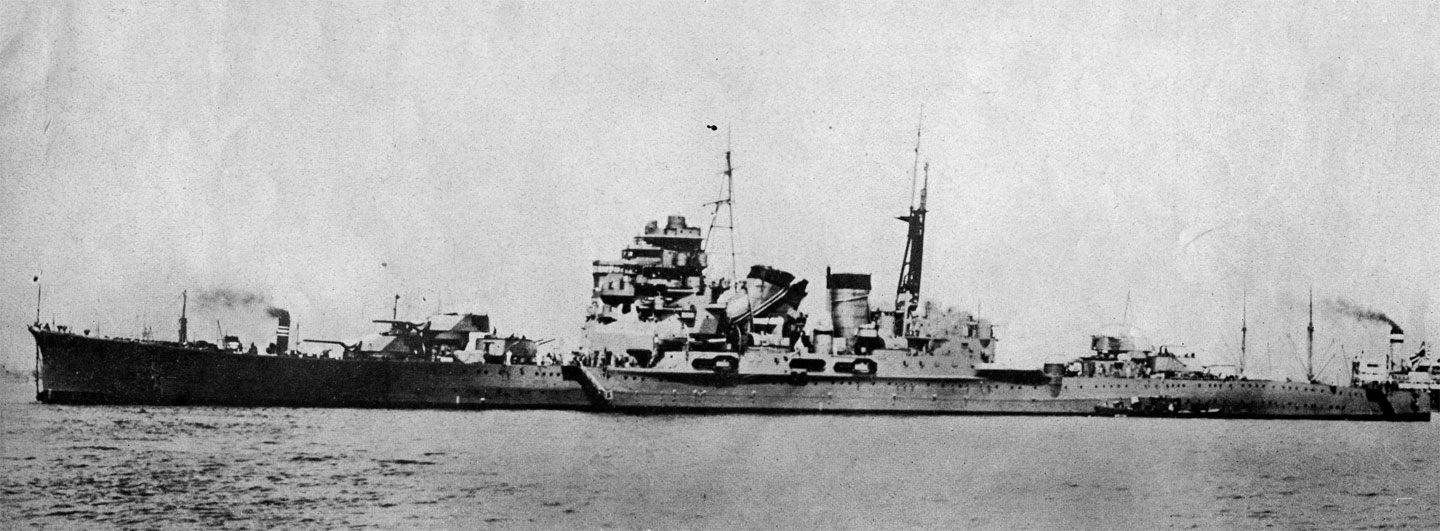
Heavy cruiser Chokai

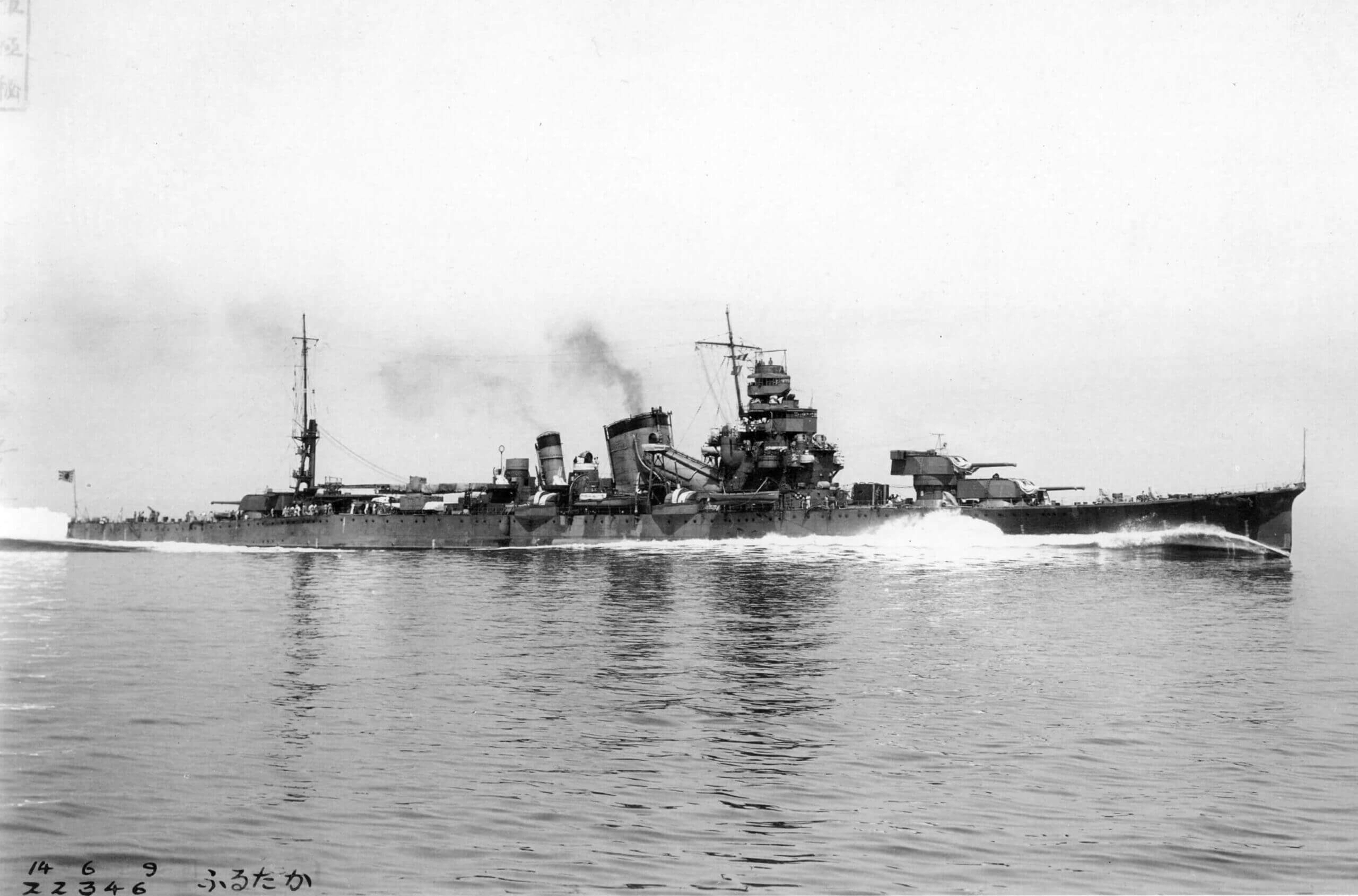
Heavy cruiser Furutaka

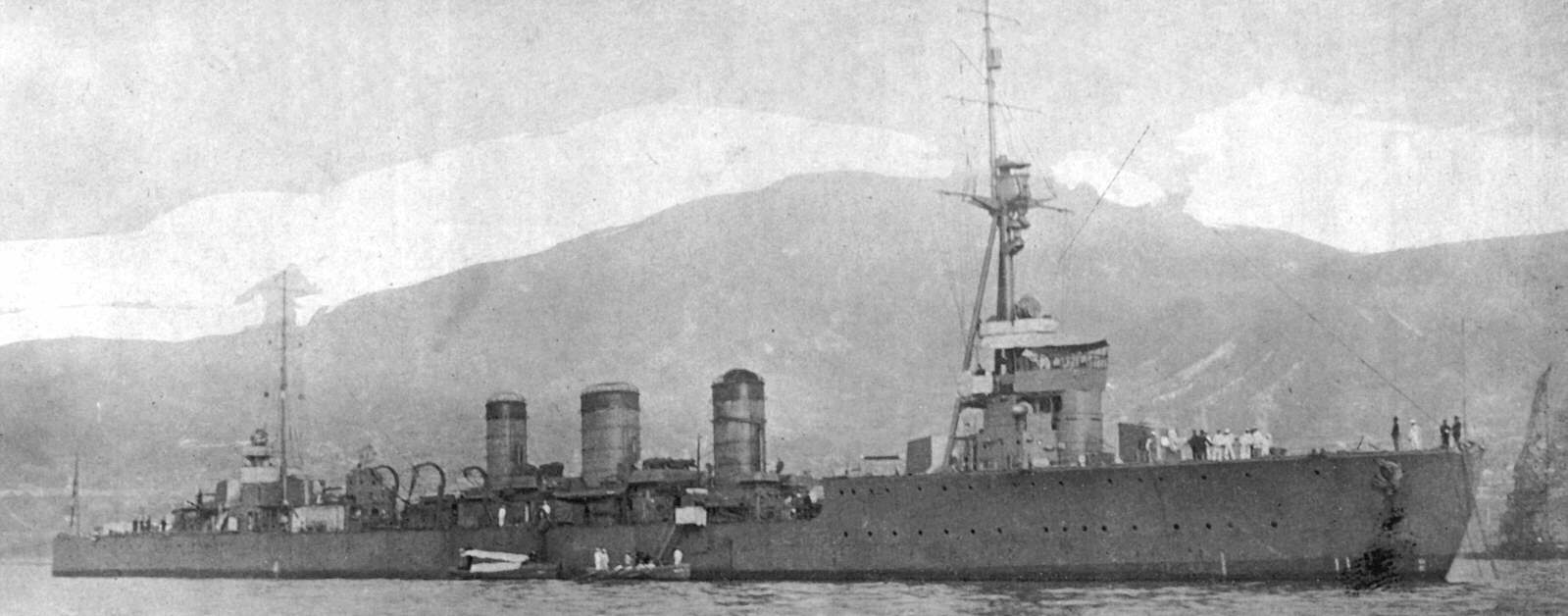
Light cruiser Tenryu

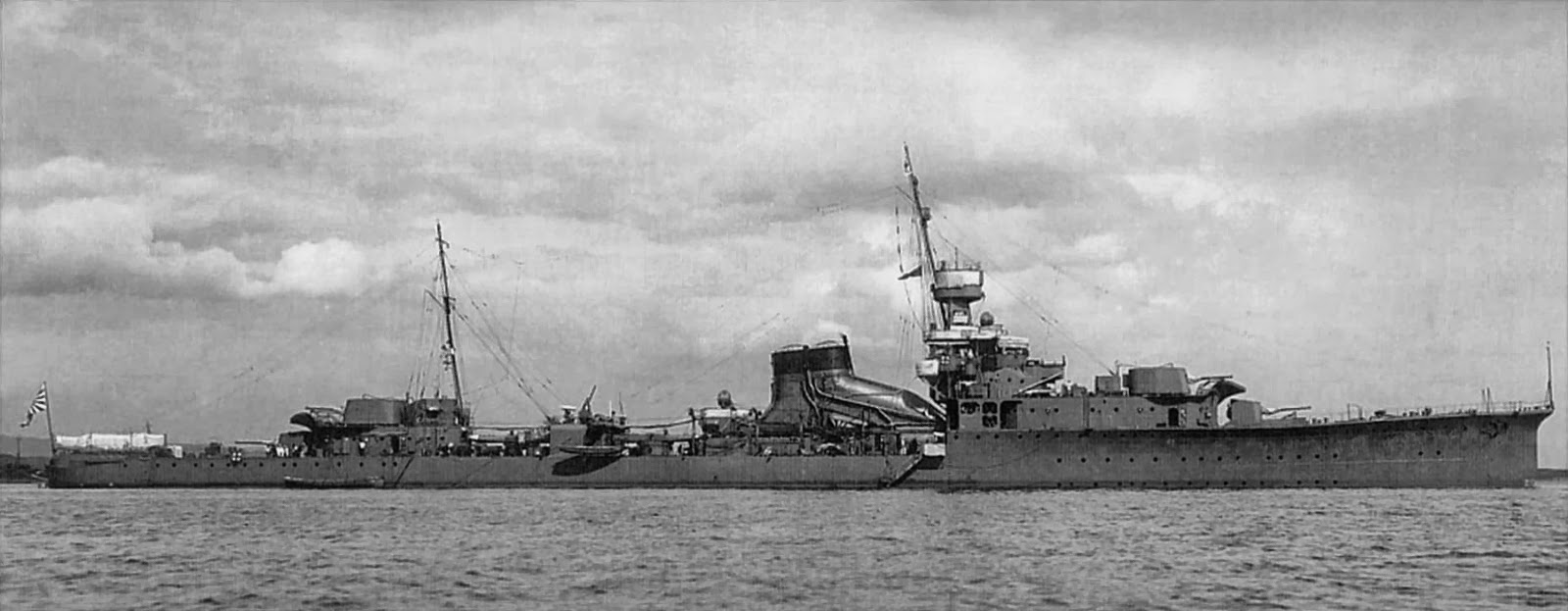
Light cruiser Yubari

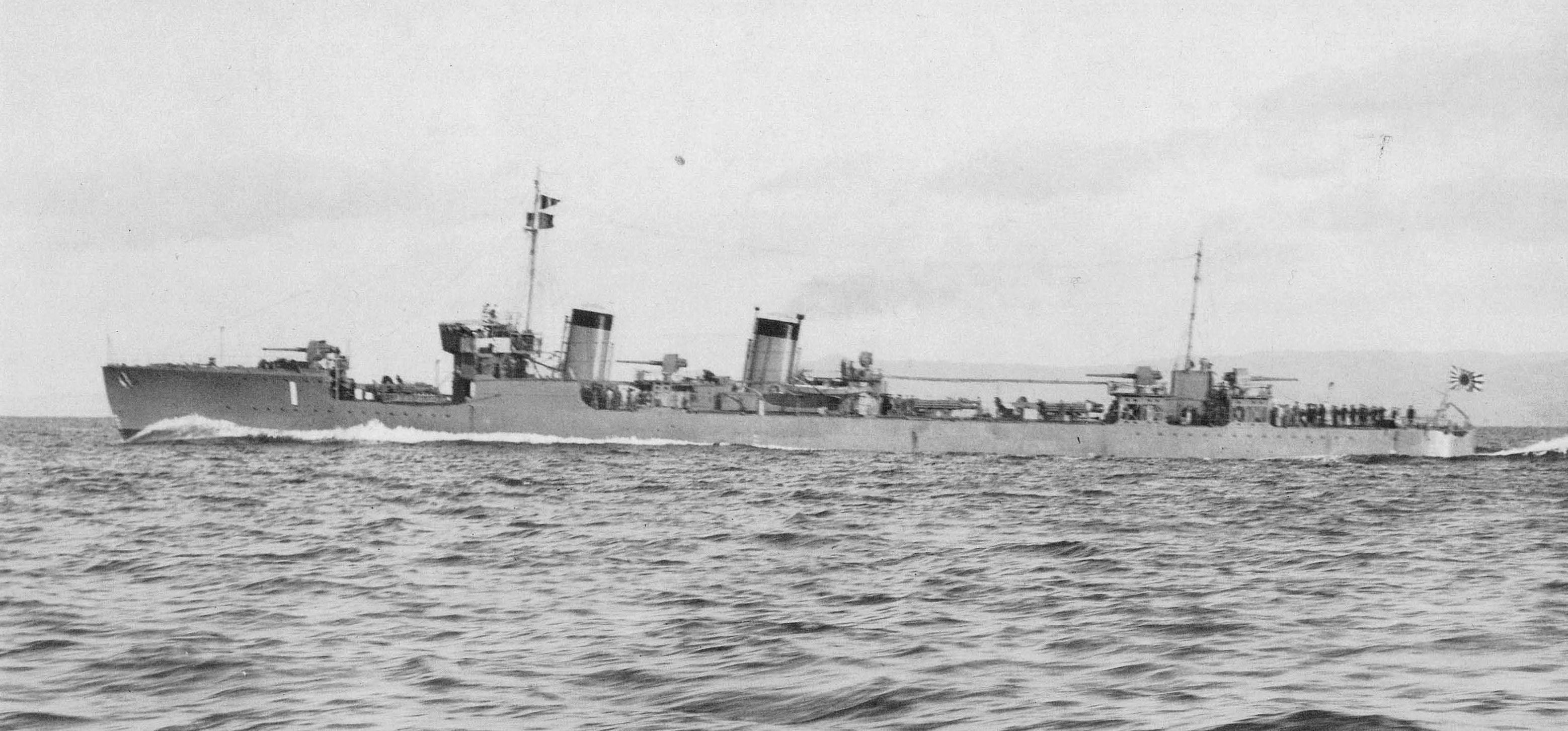
Kamikaze-class destroyer

=== Striking Force ===
Vice Admiral Gunichi Mikawa in heavy cruiser Chokai

8th Fleet

1 heavy cruiser

1 Takao-class: Chokai (damaged)

Top speed: 34.25 knots
Main battery: 10 × 8-inch
Secondary btty. (Note: Secondary armament broadside typically half the number of total guns due to side mounting.): 8 × 5-inch
Anti-aircraft btty.: 8 × 25mm, 4 × 13mm
Torpedo tubes: 16 × 24-inch

1 destroyer

1 Kamikaze-class: Yūnagi

Top speed: 37.25 knots
Main battery: 4 × 4.7-inch
Anti-aircraft btty.: 2 × 7.7mm
Torpedo tubes: 6 × 21-inch

Cruiser Division 6
Rear Admiral Aritomo Gotō in heavy cruiser Aoba

4 heavy cruisers

2 Furutaka-class: Furutaka, Kako (sunk by a submarine near Rabaul on 10 August)
2 Aoba-class: Aoba, Kinugasa (damaged)

Top speed: 33 knots
Main battery: 6 × 8-inch
Secondary btty.: 4 × 4.7-inch
Anti-aircraft btty.: 8 × 25mm, 4 × 13mm
Torpedo tubes: 8 × 24-inch

Cruiser Division 18
Rear Admiral Mitsuharu Matsuyama in light cruiser Tenryū

2 light cruisers

1 Tenryū-class: Tenryū (damaged)

Top speed: 33 knots
Main battery: 4 × 5.5-inch
Anti-aircraft btty.: 1 × 3-inch, 2 × 13mm
Torpedo tubes: 6 × 21-inch

1 Yūbari-class light cruiser: Yūbari

Top speed: 35.5 knots
Main battery: 6 × 5.5-inch
Anti-aircraft btty.: 1 × 3-inch, 2 × 13mm
Torpedo tubes: 4 × 24-inch

== Allied order of battle ==
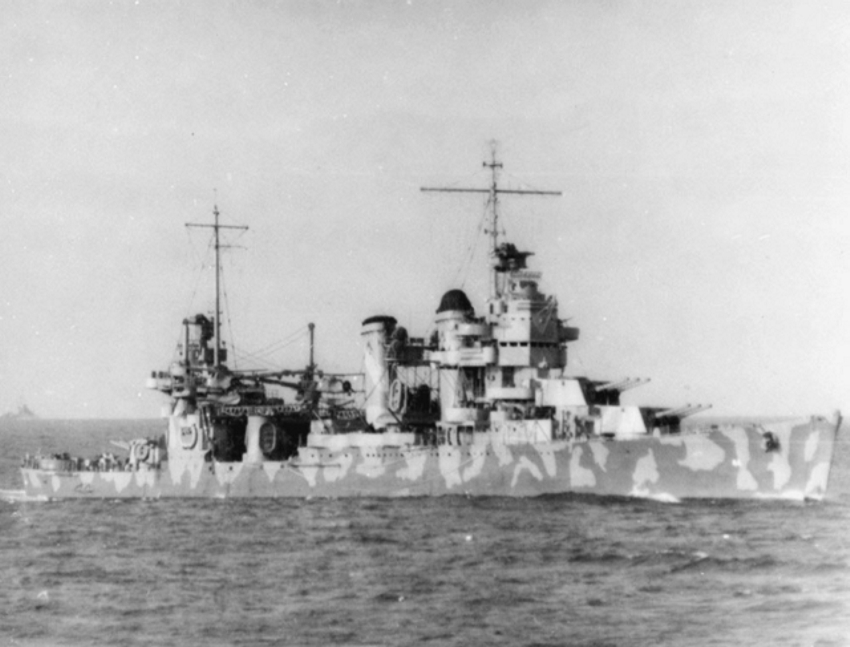
Heavy cruiser Vincennes

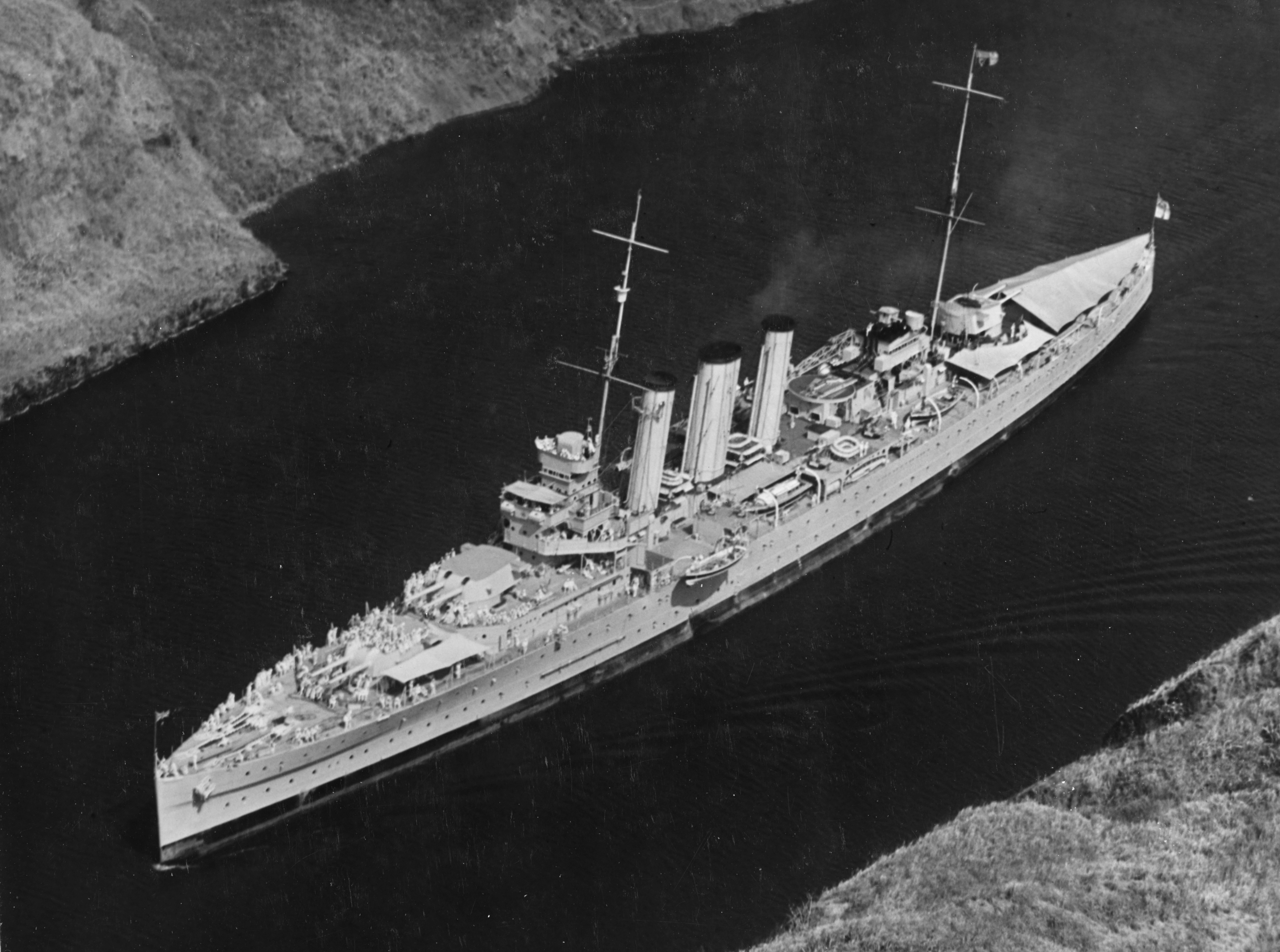
Heavy cruiser Australia passing through the Panama Canal, 1935

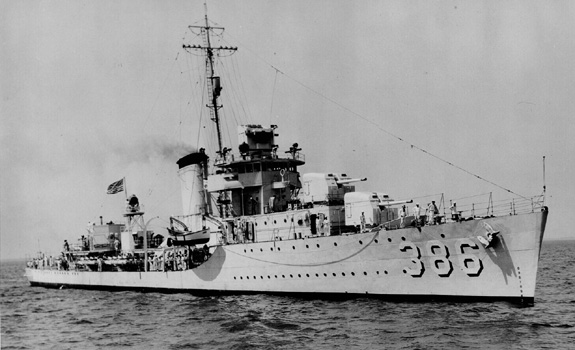
Destroyer Bagley before World War II

=== Task Group 62.6 ===
Rear Admiral Victor Crutchley (RN) in heavy cruiser Australia

Southern Force
Captain Howard D. Bode (USN) in heavy cruiser Chicago

3 heavy cruisers

2 County-class / Kent-subclass: Australia (Note: Not involved in the battle as it was delivering Rear Admiral Crutchley to a meeting with Rear Admiral Turner, who was in the command of the entire Task Force 62.), Canberra (damaged and scuttled)

Top speed: 31.5 knots
Main battery: 8 × 8-inch guns
Secondary btty.: 8 × 4-inch
Anti-aircraft btty.: 8 × 2-pounder, 8 × 50-cal.
Torpedo tubes: 8 × 21-inch

1 Northampton-class: Chicago (damaged)

Top speed: 32.7 knots
Main battery: 9 × 8-inch guns
Secondary btty.: 8 × 5-inch/25-cal. dual-purpose

2 destroyers

2 Bagley-class destroyers: Bagley, Patterson (damaged)

Top speed: 36.5 knots
Main battery: 4 × 5-inch/38-cal. (Note: Assuming by that time typical armament of 4 guns on Farragut through Gleaves class destroyers (as per Office of Naval Intelligence: "ONI 222-US, United States Navy Vessels" for example).)
Anti-aircraft btty.: 4 × 1.1-inch
Torpedo tubes: 16 × 21-inch

Northern Force
Captain Frederick L. Riefkohl (USN) in heavy cruiser Vincennes

3 heavy cruisers

All New Orleans-class: Vincennes (sunk), Astoria (sunk), Quincy (sunk)

Top speed: 32.7 knots
Main battery: 9 × 8-inch guns
Secondary btty.: 8 × 5-inch/25-cal. dual-purpose

2 destroyers

1 Benham-class: Wilson
1 Bagley-class: Helm

Top speed: 36.5 knots
Main battery: 4 × 5-inch/38-cal.
Anti-aircraft btty.: 4 × 1.1-inch
Torpedo tubes: 16 × 21-inch

== Bibliography ==
- Frank, Richard B. (1990). Guadalcanal: The Definitive Account of the Landmark Battle. New York: Penguin Group. ISBN 0-14-016561-4.
- Lundstrom, John B. (2005). First Team and the Guadalcanal Campaign: Naval Fighter Combat from August to November 1942 (New ed.). Annapolis, Maryland: Naval Institute Press. ISBN 1-59114-472-8.
- Lundstrom, John B. (2006). Black Shoe Carrier Admiral: Frank Jack Fletcher at Coral Sea, Midway, and Guadalcanal. Annapolis: Naval Institute Press. ISBN 1-59114-475-2.
- Morison, Samuel Eliot (1958). The Struggle for Guadalcanal, August 1942 – February 1943. History of United States Naval Operations in World War II. Vol. 5. Boston: Little, Brown and Company. ISBN 0-316-58305-7.
- Silverstone, Paul H. (1970). U.S. Warships of World War II. Garden City, NY: Doubleday and Co. ISBN 0-8702-1773-9.
- Watts, A. J. (1966). Japanese Warships of World War II. Shepperton, Surrey: Ian Allan Ltd. ISBN 0-7110-0215-0.
