= 358 (disambiguation) =

358 was a year of the modern era in the Julian calendar.

358 may also refer to:

- 358 (number)
- 358 BC, a year of the pre-modern era in the Julian calendar
- +358, a telephone calling code in Finland
- +358 (area code 18), a telephone calling code in Åland, Finland
- 358 missile, an Iranian surface-to-air missile
- Flight 358 (disambiguation)
- List of highways numbered 358

== See also ==
- 358th (disambiguation)
- .358 Winchester, a rifle
  - .358 Norma Magnum, a rifle cartridge
- 358 Apollonia, a main belt asteroid
- Constituency W-358, in the Provincial Assembly of Punjab
- DE-358 or USS Mack, a John C. Butler-class destroyer escort
- GD 358, a variable white dwarf star
- German submarine U-358
- London Buses route 358
- NGC 358, an asterism of four stars in the constellation of Cassiopeia
- No. 358 Squadron RAF
- United Nations Security Council Resolution 358, 1974, relating to conflict in Cyprus
