= 358th Division =

358th Division may refer to:

- 358th Infantry Division, Wehrmacht, Germany
- 358th Rifle Division, Soviet Union

== See also ==
- List of military divisions by number
- 358th (disambiguation)
