= Aritomo =

- Gender: Male

Origin
- Origin: Japanese
- Meaning: Different meanings depending on the kanji used

Aritomo (written: 有朋 or 存知) is a masculine Japanese given name. Notable people with the name include:

- Aritomo Gotō (五藤 存知; 1888–1942), Imperial Japanese Navy admiral
- Yamagata Aritomo (山縣 有朋; 1838–1922), Japanese general and Prime Minister of Japan
