= 358th Regiment =

358th Regiment may refer to:

- 358th Infantry Regiment
- 358th (Suffolk Yeomanry) Medium Regiment, Royal Artillery

== See also ==
- 358th (disambiguation)
