= 6th Cruiser Division =

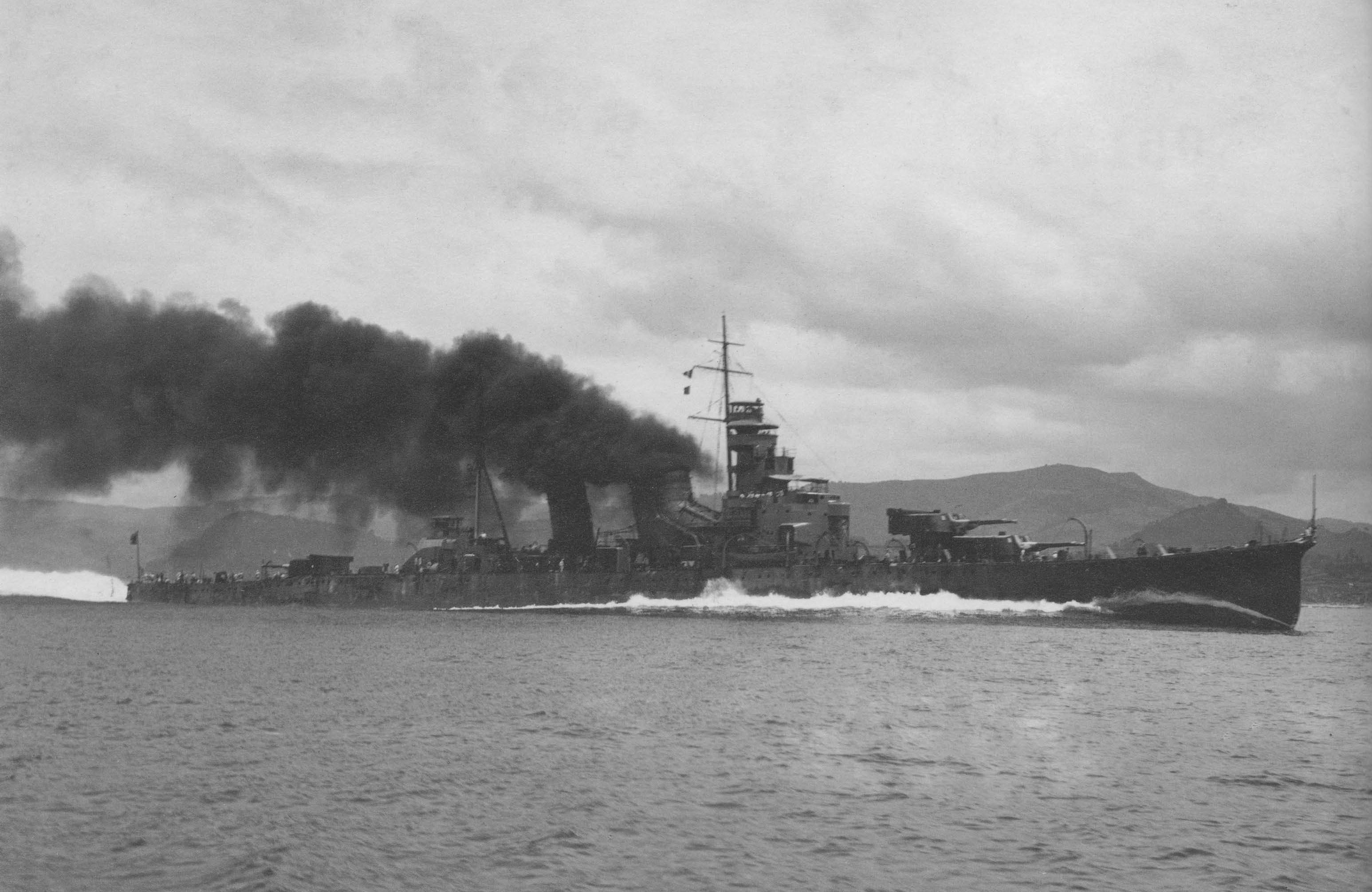
- Japanese heavy cruiser Aoba, flagship of the 6th Cruiser Division.
- Country: Empire of Japan
- Branch: (Empire of Japan) Imperial Japanese Navy
- Type: Division
- Part of: 4th Fleet, 8th Fleet
- Garrison/HQ: Truk, Kavieng
- Engagements: Invasion of Guam; Battle of Wake Island; Invasion of Rabaul; Invasion of Salamaua–Lae; Battle of the Coral Sea; Solomon Islands Campaign; New Guinea Campaign; Guadalcanal Campaign; Battle of Savo Island; Battle of the Eastern Solomons; Battle of Cape Esperance

Commanders
- Notable commanders: Aritomo Gotō

The 6th Cruiser Division (第六巡洋戦隊, Dai-roku Junyō Sentai) (CruDiv6) was a cruiser division of the Imperial Japanese Navy (IJN) that played a prominent role during the early stages of the Pacific War. The unit operated the four oldest heavy cruisers of IJN: two Furutaka-class and two Aoba-class.

== History ==
=== Background ===
On 20 May 1933, the 6th Cruiser Division (CruDiv6) received Aoba (flagship), Kinugasa, and Kako from the 5th Cruiser Division. In July and August, CruDiv6 was operating off the Chinese coast and during that time the unit was joined by Furutaka. In the autumn of 1935, CruDiv6 participated in the annual fleet manoeuvres, where several ships were damaged by a typhoon, which resulted in the 4th Fleet Incident. The two Furutaka-class and two Aoba-class cruisers were transferred to other units on 15 November that year.

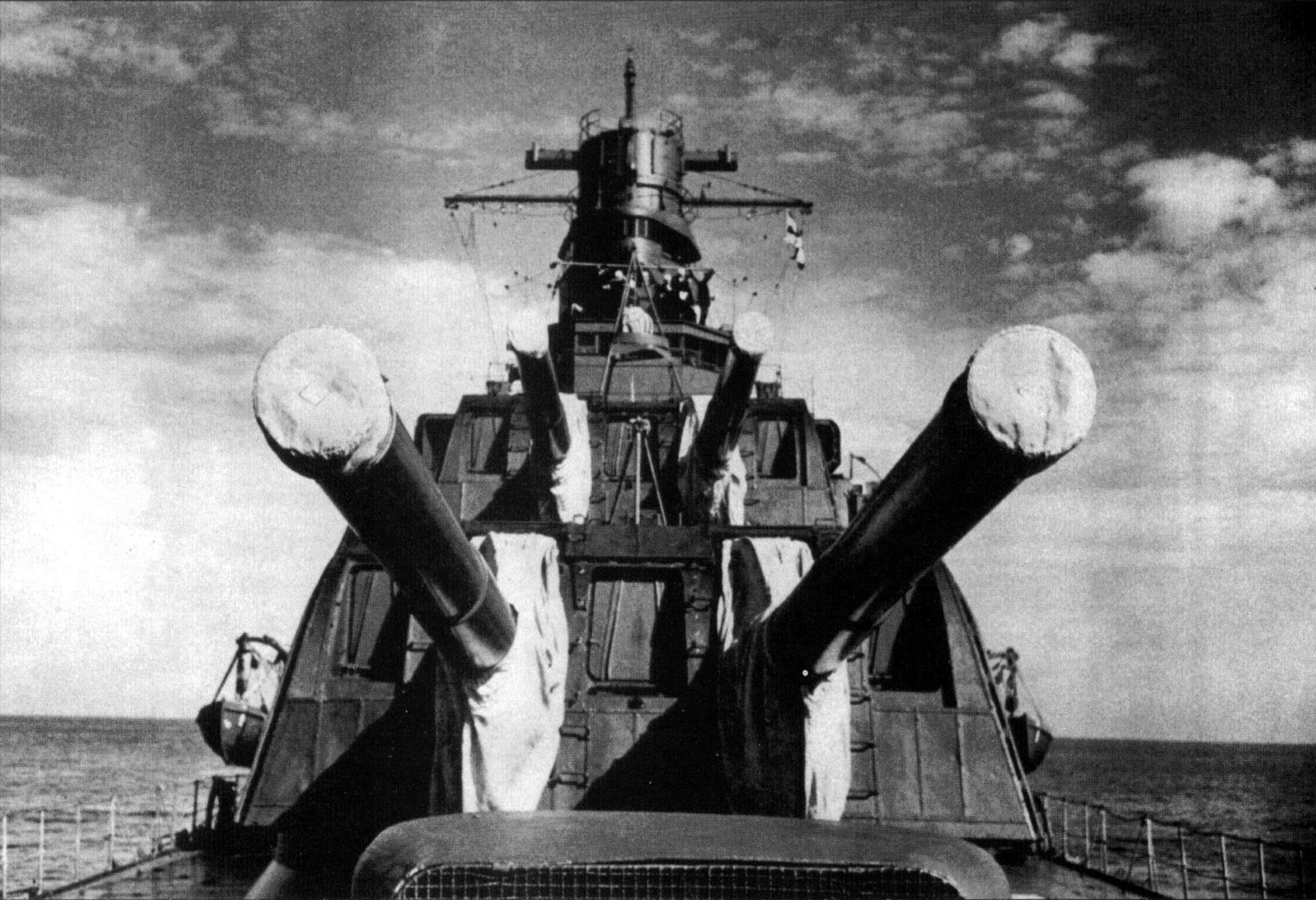
Heavy cruiser Kako's main battery after modernization.

After the modernization of Furutaka-class and Aoba-class cruisers during 1936–1940, they were again placed under CruDiv6. On 15 September 1941, Rear Admiral Aritomo Gotō was placed in the command of CruDiv6 and selected Aoba as his flagship. Aoba and Kako formed the first section of the division, while Furutaka and Kinugasa formed the Second section. On 1 November, CruDiv6 was attached to the 4th Fleet of Vice Admiral Shigeyoshi Inoue, which was designated as the South Seas Force tasked with capturing various areas in South Pacific.

=== Pacific War ===
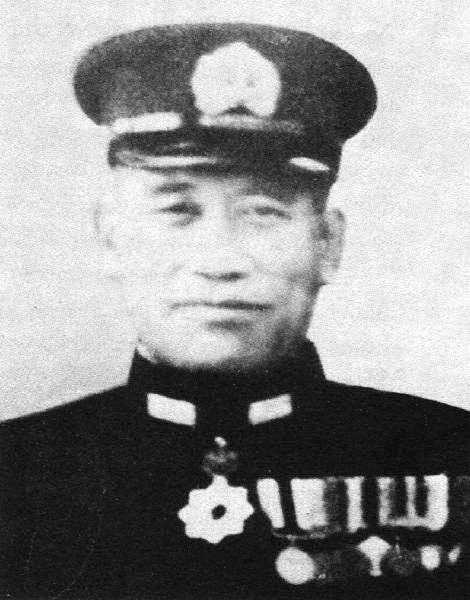
Rear Admiral Aritomo Gotō was the commander of the 6th Cruiser Division (CruDiv6) during the Pacific War.

At the outbreak of the Pacific War in December 1941, CruDiv6 was tasked with covering the Invasion of Guam. After the unsuccessful first attempt at Invasion of Wake Island, in second half of December CruDiv6 was assigned to support the second invasion, which also included the carrier strike force of the 2nd Carrier Division under Rear Admiral Tamon Yamaguchi consisting of carriers Hiryū and Sōryū. With Wake Island captured, CruDiv6 was then assigned to provide distant cover for the invasion Invasion of Rabaul in January 1942 where the 1st Carrier Division under Vice Admiral Chūichi Nagumo consisting of carriers Akagi and Kaga and the 5th Carrier Division under Rear Admiral Chūichi Hara consisting of carriers Shōkaku and Zuikaku provided air support. While operating east of New Ireland on 21 January, the cruisers shot down a Consolidated PBY Catalina racon flying boat of Royal Australian Air Force (RAAF) No. 24 Squadron operating from Tulagi and took its crew as prisoners of war. During the aborted United States Navy (US Navy) raid on Rabul, CruDiv6 with the 18th Cruiser Division (CruDiv18) sortied from Truk in an attempt to pursue Vice Admiral Wilson Brown's Task Force 11 centred around carrier Lexington but failed to catch them. After the capture of Rabaul and Kavieng, CruDiv6 participated in Invasion of Salamaua–Lae by providing a distant cover. Afterwards, the unit was based at Kaveing and sortied out to provide support for the seizure of Bougainville, Buka, Shortland Islands, and Mono Island.

In May 1942, CruDiv6 participated in Operation MO which aimed to capture Port Moresby on New Guinea and Tulagi in the Solomon Islands. The unit was tasked to cover the invasion convoy carrying troops for Port Moresby. In addition to the four Furutaka-class and Aoba-class cruisers, carrier Shōhō was placed under Rear Admiral Gotō's command to provide air cover. In the issuing Battle of the Coral Sea, US Navy carrier-based aircraft from Lexington and Yorktown sank Shōhō on May 7, which prompted Vice Admiral Inoue to cancel the operation and recall the invasion convoy. The next day, Rear Admiral Gotō's cruisers of CruDiv6 covered the withdrawal of Shōkaku, which sustained damage in the carrier engagement.

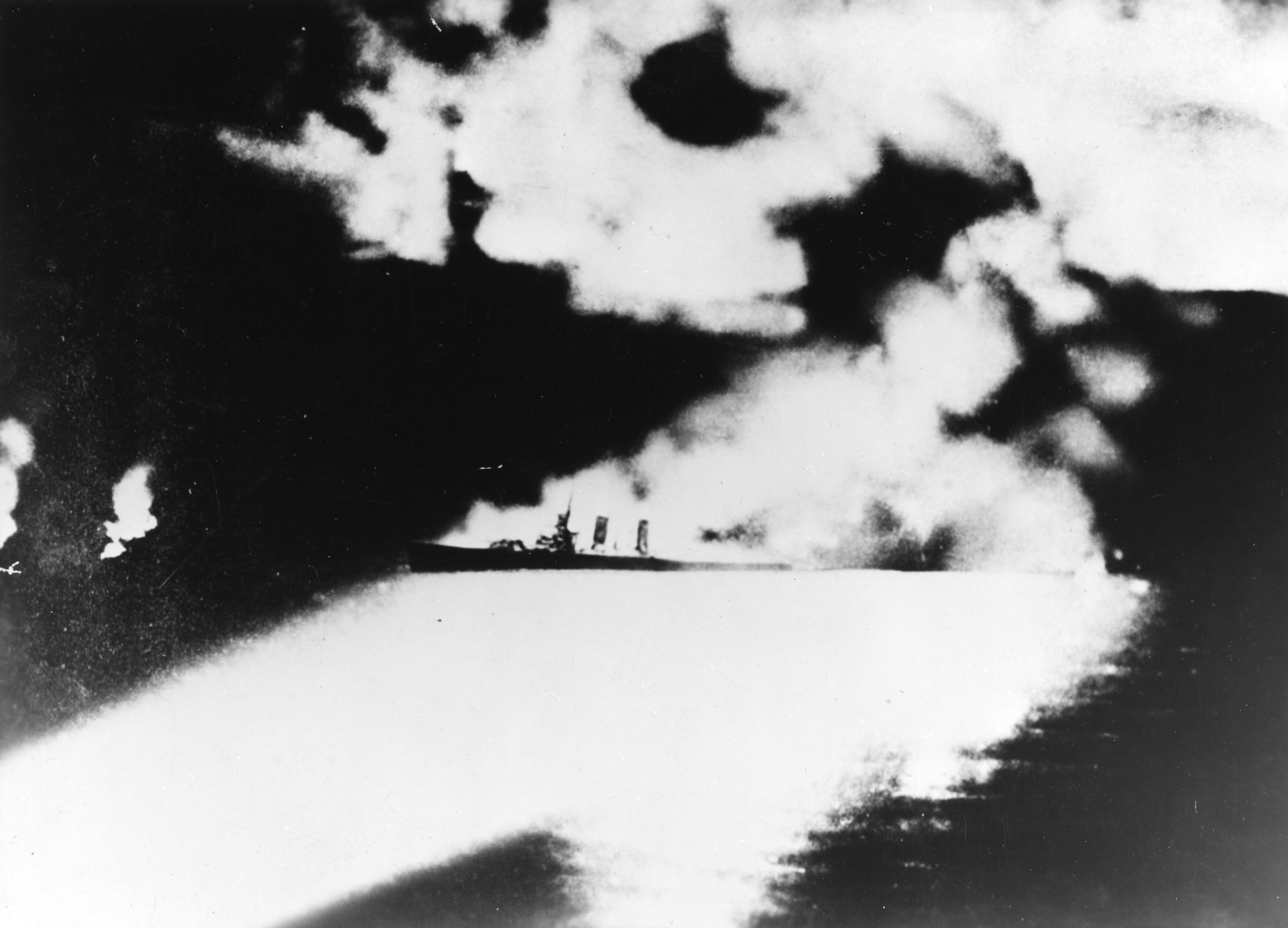
Warships of the 6th Cruiser Division, part of Vice Admiral Gunichi Mikawa's striking force, dealt a major defeat to Allied naval forces at the Battle of Savo Island on 9 August 1942 by sinking four heavy cruisers.

On 14 July 1942, CruDiv6 was attached to the newly established 8th Fleet under Vice Admiral Gunichi Mikawa, which was designated as Outer South Seas Force and tasked in guarding conquests in the South Pacific. Vice Admiral Mikawa detached CruDiv6 under Rear Admiral Gotō to Kavieng on New Ireland, in order to move them out of the range of Allied aircraft. When the news of Allied landings on Guadalcanal and Tulagi reached the 8th Fleet headquarters on August 7, Mikawa promptly decided to make a night-time counter-attack with his available surface naval forces. He ordered Rear Admiral Gotō CruDiv6 to depart Kavieng and meet his flagship Chōkai, CruDiv18 (light cruisers Tenryū and Yūbari) under Rear Admiral Mitsuharu Matsuyama, and destroyer Yūnagi near Rabaul. In the ensuing Battle of Savo Island in the early morning of 9 August, the cruiser striking force decisively defeated Allied Task Force 62.2 composed of United States Navy and Royal Australian Navy warships under the command of British Rear Admiral Victor Crutchley. While CruDiv6 was returning to Kavieng on 10 August, the heavy cruiser Kako was torpedoed and sunk by the US submarine S-44.

During the Battle of the Eastern Solomons in late August 1942, Chōkai under Vice Admiral Mikawa and CruDiv6 with the remaining three heavy cruisers (Aoba, Kinugasa and Furutaka) under Rear Admiral Gotō provided a distant cover for Rear Admiral Raizō Tanaka's reinforcement convoy headed for Guadalcanal. Nevertheless, Tanaka's convoy was hit by US Marine aircraft from Henderson Field on Guadalcanal and the resupply mission failed.

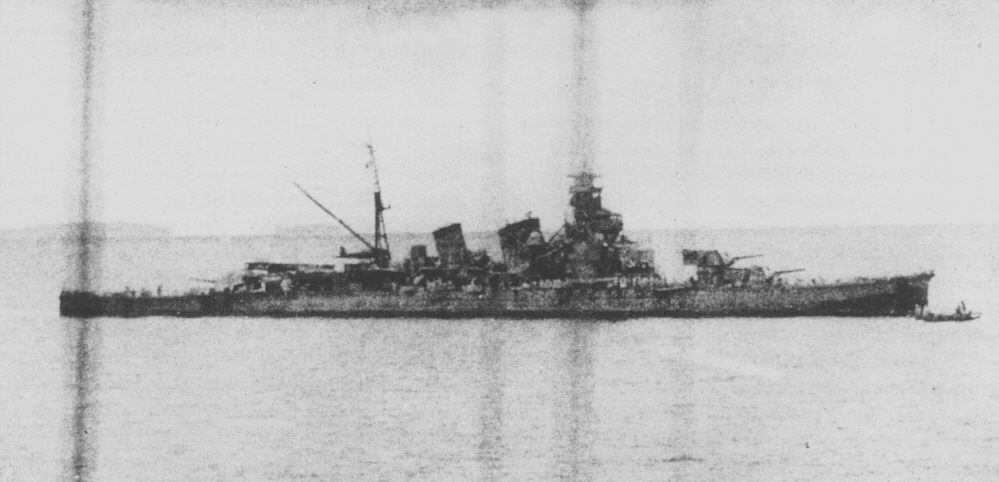
6th Cruiser Division suffered a major defeat at the Battle of Cape Esperance on the night of 11/12 October 1942. Damaged heavy cruiser Aoba photographed off Buin, Bougainville on 13 October.

==== Guadalcanal ====
In mid-October 1942, CruDiv6 and two destroyers under Rear Admiral Gotō were tasked to cover the high-speed convoy of re-purposed seaplane tenders Chitose and Nisshin to deliver heavy equipment (including artillery) to the Imperial Japanese Army (IJA) on Guadalcanal. On the night of 11/12 October, while heading toward Guadalcanal they were ambushed by two heavy cruisers, two light cruisers, and five destroyers under Rear Admiral Norman Scott, which resulted in the Battle of Cape Esperance. The battle resulted in the loss of Furutaka and one Japanese destroyer, in exchange for the loss of one US Navy destroyer. Furthermore, Rear Admiral Gotō was also mortally wounded in the battle when his flagship Aoba was hit. Nevertheless, the convoy managed to unload the supplies and equipment on Guadalcanal successfully. Two of its destroyers, while retreating from Guadalcanal, were sunk by air attacks the following day. The damaged Aoba was sent for repairs which left Kinugasa as the only operational ship in CruDiv6. Another major resupply run was conducted on the night of 14/15 October by Nisshin, while Vice Admiral Mikawa with his 8th Fleet flagship Chōkai and Kinugasa of CruDiv6 shelled Allied position on Guadalcanal to cover the cargo unloading process.

On 10 November 1942, CruDiv6 was disbanded and the remaining cruiser Kinugasa was transferred directly to the 8th Fleet. Kinugasa later participated in the Naval Battle of Guadalcanal, after which she was sunk by Allied aircraft on the morning of 14 November.

== Commanders of the 6th Cruiser Division ==
5th generation

#	Rank	Name	Date
1	Rear Admiral	Hisao Ichimura	20 May 1933 – 15 November 1933
2	Rear Admiral	Akira Gotō	15 November 1933 – 15 November 1934
3	Rear Admiral	Keitaro Hara	15 November 1934 – 15 November 1935
Division deactivated on 15 November 1935

6th generation

#	Rank	Name	Date
1	Rear Admiral	Mitsumi Shimizu	20 May 1939 – 15 November 1939
2	Rear Admiral	Minoru Tayui	15 November 1939 – 15 November 1940
3	Rear Admiral	Kakusaburo Makita	15 November 1940 – 15 September 1941
4	Rear Admiral	Aritomo Gotō	15 September 1941 – 12 October 1942
Vacant			12 October 1942 – 18 December 1942
Division deactivated on 18 December 1942
