= USS Mack =

1944 John C. Butler-class destroyer escort of the U.S. Navy

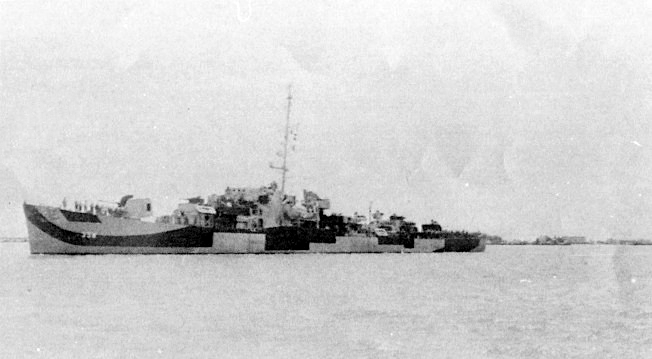
- USS Mack (DE-358) c. September 1944

History

United States
- Name: Mack
- Namesake: Harold John Mack
- Builder: Consolidated Steel Corporation, Orange, Texas
- Laid down: 14 February 1944
- Launched: 11 April 1944
- Commissioned: 16 August 1944
- Decommissioned: 11 December 1946
- Stricken: 15 March 1972
- Fate: Scrapped, 1973

General characteristics
- Class & type: John C. Butler-class destroyer escort
- Displacement: 1,350 long tons (1,372 t)
- Length: 306 ft (93 m)
- Beam: 36 ft 8 in (11.18 m)
- Draft: 9 ft 5 in (2.87 m)
- Propulsion: 2 boilers, 2 geared turbine engines, 12,000 shp (8,900 kW); 2 propellers
- Speed: 24 knots (44 km/h; 28 mph)
- Range: 6,000 nmi (11,000 km; 6,900 mi) at 12 kn (22 km/h; 14 mph)
- Complement: 14 officers, 201 enlisted
- Armament: 2 × single 5 in (127 mm) guns; 2 × twin 40 mm (1.6 in) AA guns; 10 × single 20 mm (0.79 in) AA guns; 1 × triple 21 in (533 mm) torpedo tubes; 8 × depth charge throwers; 1 × Hedgehog ASW mortar; 2 × depth charge racks

USS Mack (DE-358) was a John C. Butler-class destroyer escort in service with the United States Navy from 1944 to 1946. The ship was scrapped in 1973.

== Namesake ==
Harold John Mack was born on 29 December 1917 in LeMars, Iowa. He enlisted in the United States Navy on 18 May 1938. He reported to USS Vincennes on 14 September 1938 after completing training at Great Lakes, Illinois. During the Battle of Savo Island on 9 August 1942, Gunner's Mate 2/c Mack was incapacitated by severe wounds in both legs. In spite of his injuries he continued to fulfill his duties as gun captain until ordered to abandon ship. After the loss of the ship, Mack was reported missing in action and was declared dead on 10 August 1943. He was posthumously awarded the Navy Cross.

== History ==
The warship was launched on 11 April 1944 by Consolidated Steel Corp., Shipbuilding Division at Orange, Texas, sponsored by Mrs. Gertrude Mack, mother of the ship's namesake. The destroyer escort was commissioned on 16 August 1944.

=== Pacific Theatre operations ===
After initial shakedown exercises off the East Coast of the United States, Mack assembled with ComCortDiv 82 at Norfolk, Virginia, 17 to 20 October 1944, and departed on 21 November for the Panama Canal en route to the Pacific Ocean. Becoming a unit of the U.S. 7th Fleet Mack escorted convoys between Hollandia, New Guinea, Kossol Roads, Palau Islands, and Leyte until March 1945. On 2 March she commenced antisubmarine patrols in the South China Sea off the Philippines. Investigating sonar contact on 13 March, Mack grounded on an uncharted shoal in Mangarin Bay, damaging both screws and tall shafts. Towed to Hollandia for repairs, which lasted from 14 April to 4 June, she returned to escort duty between Hollandia and Manila on 14 June.

A month later Mack commenced working for the port director, Manila, escorting ships to San Fernando, Luzon, until 3 August when she was placed under the authority of the port director, Subic, and escorted a convoy of landing craft from Subic Bay to Okinawa.

=== End-of-war activity ===
Two days after the signing of the surrender terms, Mack began air-sea rescue patrols between the Philippines and the Palaus, returning to escort duty on 16 August to accompany a slow tow through the “typhoon belt" to Okinawa. Completing that assignment, she commenced air sea rescue patrols east of Samar, Philippine Islands.

Relieved of this duty on 6 December, Mack got underway for Okinawa and Shanghai on 8 December, returning to Subic Bay on 27 December.

=== Collision at sea ===
While standing by for escort duty at San Fernando, 10 January 1946, Mack answering a distress call from FS-74, proceeded through heavy weather to the disabled ship's position. In the course of passing much needed food and water to the crew of FS-74, the two ships collided, causing damage to Mack's bow (11 January). Mack returned to San Fernando and escorted the waiting ships to Subic Bay, remaining at Subic for three weeks undergoing repairs and holding drills.

=== Operations in the China area ===
Departing Subic Bay 11 February, Mack joined Escort Division 33 and set course for Qingdao, China, where the U.S. 7th Fleet was lending support to the U.S.-China policy; standing by to protect, if necessary, American interests during the fighting between the Nationalist forces and the Communists. Arriving on 20 February, Mack took part in training exercises off the China coast and made brief trips to Shanghai and Taku before departing Chinese waters on 15 April, for Okinawa to take on naval passengers en route to the United States.

Arriving at San Pedro, Los Angeles on 11 May 1946 Mack debarked her passengers, unloaded her ammunition and began undergoing a period of inactivation and preservation.

=== Post-war decommissioning ===
Mack was placed out of commission in reserve on 11 December 1946 at San Diego, California. She was placed in the Pacific inactive Fleet, berthed at Mare Island, California. On 15 March 1972 she was struck from the Navy list, and, on 13 June 1973, she was sold for scrap.
