= 358th Infantry Division =

- 358. Infanterie-Division
- Active: 10 March 1940 – 23 August 1940
- Country: Nazi Germany
- Branch: Army (Wehrmacht)
- Type: Infantry
- Size: Division

The 358th Infantry Division (German: 358. Infanterie-Division), also alternatively dubbed 358th Landesschützen Division (German: 358. Landesschützen-Division), was an infantry division of the Heer, the ground forces of Nazi Germany, during World War II. It was active between March and August 1940.

== History ==
The 358th Infantry Division was formed on 10 March 1940 as a Landesschützen formation of the ninth deployment wave in Kraków in German-occupied Poland. Its initial staff personnel was drawn from the staff of Oberfeldkommandantur 540, and the division initially consisted of the Infantry Regiments 644, 645, and 646, with three battalions each, for a total of nine infantry battalions in the division. Additionally, it was equipped with an artillery battery, a reconnaissance squadron, a signals company, and divisional resupply units. The members of the 358th Infantry Division were mainly drawn from older men that had been conscripted upon the outbreak of the war.

After a brief stint between March and May as part of Grenz-Abschnitts-Kommando Süd, part of the German occupation force in Poland, the division was posted in June 1940, after the German victory in the Battle of France, under the commander of the Replacement Army (German: Befehlshaber des Ersatzheeres) and used as part of 16th Army in the German military administration in occupied France.

On 23 August 1940, the division was dissolved after transfer to its administrative home district, Military District VIII (Silesia). The III./645 battalion became the Guard Battalion 722, the battalions I./644, II./644, I./645, II./645, I./646, and II./646 became home guard battalions (German: Heimat-Wach-Bataillone) and were tasked with the supervision of Germany's newly acquired prisoners of war; they were on 1 January 1941 designated the Landesschützen battalions 564 through 569. The battalions III./644 and III./646 were dissolved without replacement.

Throughout the division's entire duration of service, the divisional commander was Rudolf Pitz.
