= Constituency W-358 =

Provincial constituency of Punjab, Pakistan

W-358
- Woman Reserved constituency for the Provincial Assembly of Punjab

Current constituency

W-358 is a reserved constituency for female in the Provincial Assembly of Punjab.

== See also ==
- Punjab, Pakistan
