= Japanese destroyer Yūnagi (1924) =

Kamikaze-class destroyer

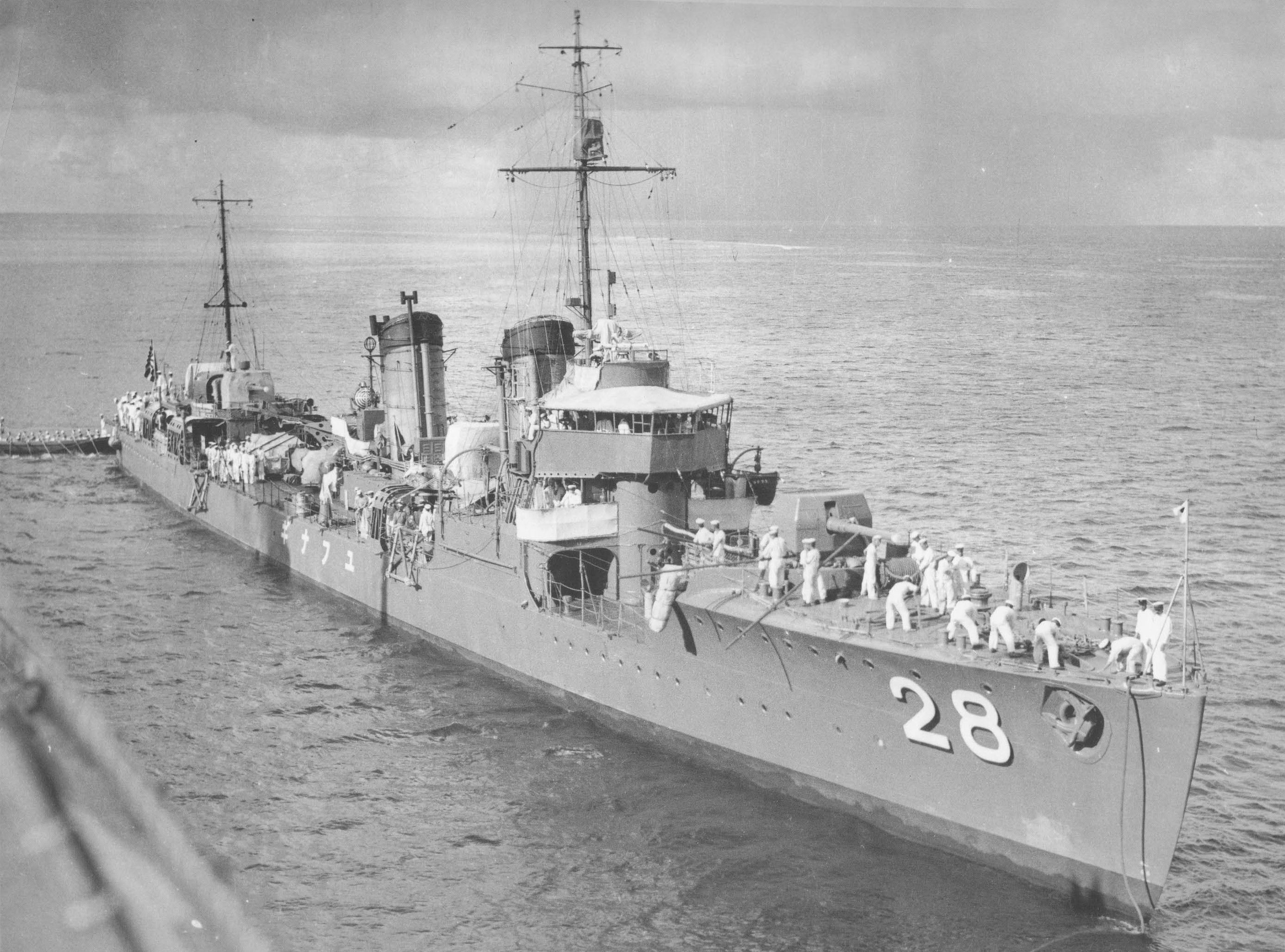
- Yūnagi, 5 September 1936

History

Empire of Japan
- Name: Yūnagi
- Builder: Sasebo Naval Arsenal
- Laid down: 17 September 1923 as Destroyer No. 17
- Launched: 23 April 1924
- Completed: 24 May 1925
- Renamed: Yūnagi, 1 August 1928
- Stricken: 6 October 1944
- Fate: Sunk on 25 August 1944

General characteristics
- Class & type: Kamikaze-class destroyer
- Displacement: 1,422 t (1,400 long tons) (normal); 1,747 t (1,719 long tons) (deep load)
- Length: 97.5 m (319 ft 11 in) (pp); 102.5 m (336 ft 3 in) (o/a)
- Beam: 9.1 m (29 ft 10 in)
- Draft: 2.9 m (9 ft 6 in)
- Installed power: 38,500 shp (28,700 kW); 4 × Kampon water-tube boilers
- Propulsion: 2 shafts; 2 × Kampon geared steam turbines
- Speed: 37.3 knots (69.1 km/h; 42.9 mph)
- Range: 3,600 nmi (6,700 km; 4,100 mi) at 14 knots (26 km/h; 16 mph)
- Complement: 148
- Armament: 4 × single 12 cm (4.7 in) Type 3 guns; 3 × twin 53.3 cm (21.0 in) torpedo tubes

Service record
- Operations: Battle of Wake Island; New Guinea Campaign; Solomon Islands Campaign; Battle of Savo Island; Battle of the Philippine Sea

The Japanese destroyer Yūnagi (夕凪, "Evening Calm") was one of nine Kamikaze-class destroyers built for the Imperial Japanese Navy (IJN) during the 1920s. During the Pacific War, she participated in the occupation of the Gilbert Islands and the Battle of Wake Island in December 1941 and then the occupations of New Guinea and the Solomon Islands in early 1942.

== Design and description ==
The Kamikaze class was an improved version of the Minekaze-class destroyers. The ships had an overall length of 102.5 meters (336 ft 3 in) and were 97.5 meters (319 ft 11 in) between perpendiculars. They had a beam of 9.1 meters (29 ft 10 in), and a mean draft of 2.9 meters (9 ft 6 in). The Kamikaze-class ships displaced 1,422 metric tons (1,400 long tons) at standard load and 1,747 metric tons (1,719 long tons) at deep load. They were powered by two Parsons geared steam turbines, each driving one propeller shaft, using steam provided by four Kampon water-tube boilers. The turbines were designed to produce 38,500 shaft horsepower (28,700 kW), which would propel the ships at 37.3 knots (69.1 km/h; 42.9 mph). During her sea trials, Yūnagi comfortably exceeded her designed speed, reaching 38.7 knots (71.7 km/h; 44.5 mph). The ships carried 420 metric tons (413 long tons) of fuel oil which gave them a range of 3,600 nautical miles (6,700 km; 4,100 mi) at 14 knots (26 km/h; 16 mph). Their crew consisted of 148 officers and crewmen.

The main armament of the Kamikaze-class ships consisted of four 12-centimeter (4.7 in) Type 3 guns in single mounts; one gun forward of the superstructure, one between the two funnels and the last pair back to back atop the aft superstructure. The guns were numbered '1' to '4' from front to rear. The ships carried three above-water twin sets of 53.3-centimeter (21.0 in) torpedo tubes; one mount was between the forward superstructure and the forward gun and the other two were between the aft funnel and aft superstructure.

Early in the war, the No. 4 gun and the aft torpedo tubes were removed in exchange for four depth charge throwers and 18 depth charges. In addition 10 license-built 25 mm (0.98 in) Type 96 light AA guns were installed. These changes increased their displacement to 1,499 long tons (1,523 t). Survivors had their light AA armament augmented to be between thirteen and twenty 25 mm guns and four 13.2 mm (0.5 in) Type 93 anti-aircraft machineguns by June 1944. These changes reduced their speed to 35 knots (65 km/h; 40 mph).

== Construction and career ==
Yūnagi, built at the Sasebo Naval Arsenal, was laid down on 17 September 1923, launched on 23 April 1924 and completed on 24 May 1925. Originally commissioned as Destroyer No. 17, the ship was assigned the name Yūnagi on 1 August 1928. By 1936, the ship's number had become 28.

=== Pacific War ===
At the time of the attack on Pearl Harbor on 7 December 1941, Yūnagi and Asanagi were assigned to Destroyer Division 29 of Destroyer Squadron 6 of the 4th Fleet, based at Truk. The destroyer provided cover for the Gilbert Islands invasion force from 8–10 December 1941, and subsequently was assigned to the second Wake Island invasion force on December 23.

From January through March 1942, Yūnagi provided cover for the landings of Japanese forces during Operation R (the invasion of Rabaul, New Britain) and Operation SR (the invasion of Lae and Salamaua). While patrolling out of Lae on 10 March, she suffered medium damage from strafing attacks, forcing a return to Sasebo for repairs by April. Once repairs were completed in June, the ship escorted convoys from Moji in Kyūshū back to Rabaul, via the Philippines and Palau.

Yūnagi participated in the Battle of Savo Island from 8–9 August 1942, engaging the destroyer USS Jarvis in combat, but withdrawing without taking any damage. She spent the remainder of August through March 1943 on patrols in the Solomon Islands and central Pacific.

After a refit at Sasebo in March 1943, Yūnagi was reassigned to the IJN 8th Fleet, returning to Rabaul in June. During June and July, she made several "Tokyo Express" troop transport runs to Kolombangara, assisting in the sinking of the destroyer USS Strong on 4 July and in the Battle of Kolombangara on 12 July. In July, while at Shortland, Yūnagi was hit by an Allied air strike, which caused medium damage to her hull.

On 2 October, Yūnagi helped provide cover for the evacuation of Japanese troops from Kolombangara and made numerous "Tokyo Express" runs throughout the Solomon Islands through the end of the year. In January 1944, she returned to Sasebo for repairs, after which she escorted troop convoys to Saipan in March and April. In May, the ship was reassigned to Destroyer Division 22, Destroyer Squadron 3, Central Pacific Area Fleet, performing convoy escort duties in the Philippines and environs through June.

On 19–20 June, Yūnagi escorted Admiral Jisaburō Ozawa’s 1st Supply Force at the Battle of the Philippine Sea. Afterwards, she was assigned to escort tanker convoys via Manila to Kure.

On 18 July 1944 Yūnagi was reassigned directly to the Combined Fleet. From 10–18 August 1944, she escorted a convoy from Moji via Mako towards Manila, but detached to Takao to assist the damaged transport Eiyō Maru. On her return from Takao to Manila, she was torpedoed and sunk 20 miles (32 km) north-northeast of Cape Bojeador, Luzon at coordinates 18°46′N 120°46′E by the submarine USS Picuda on 25 August 1944, with 32 crewmen killed and 19 wounded. Yūnagi was struck from the Navy List on 6 October 1944.
