= Aritomo Gotō =

Japanese admiral (1888–1942)

- 五藤 存知
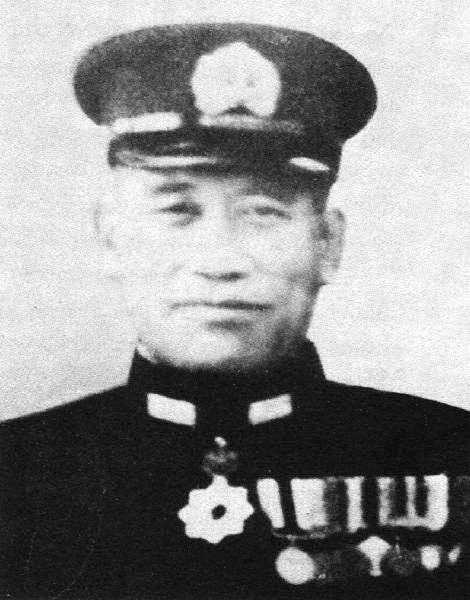
- Born: 23 January 1888; Ibaraki, Empire of Japan
- Died: 12 October 1942 (aged 54); Cape Esperance, off Guadalcanal, Solomon Islands
- Military career
- Allegiance: Empire of Japan
- Branch: Imperial Japanese Navy
- Service years: 1910–1942
- Rank: Vice Admiral (posthumous)
- Commands: Tsuta, Urakaze, Numakaze, Nokaze, Uzuki, Nadakaze, Uranami, Matsukaze, Naka, Atago, Chōkai, Mutsu, Yamashiro, 27th Destroyer Group, 5th Destroyer Group, 10th Destroyer Group, 2nd Cruiser Division, Close Support Force, Invasion Force, Support Force Main Body, 6th Cruiser Division
- Conflicts: World War I; World War II; Pacific War; Battle of Wake Island; Invasion of Tulagi; Battle of the Coral Sea; Battle of Savo Island; Battle of Cape Esperance †
- Awards: Order of the Rising Sun (4th class)

Aritomo Gotō (五藤 存知, Gotō Aritomo; 23 January 1888 – 12 October 1942) was an admiral in the Imperial Japanese Navy during World War II.

== Early career ==
Gotō was born in Ibaraki prefecture in 1888. He graduated from the 38th class of the Imperial Japanese Naval Academy in 1910, ranked 30th out of a class of 149 cadets. As a midshipman, he served on the cruiser Kasagi and battleship Satsuma. On being commissioned as ensign in 1911, he was assigned to Iwami, followed by the submarine tender Toyohashi.

After his promotion to sub-lieutenant in 1913, Gotō served on the destroyer Murakumo. During World War I, he was sent to the South Pacific to man a radio outpost, and later as a crewman on the cruiser Chikuma. After his promotion to lieutenant in 1917, he served on the battleship Kongō, the destroyer Tanikaze and the cruiser Yakumo.

As a lieutenant commander from 1923, Gotō captained the destroyers Tsuta, Urakaze, Numakaze, Nokaze, Uzuki and Nadakaze. After his promotion to commander in 1928, he commanded the Uranami, Matsukaze, Destroyer Group 27, and Destroyer Group 5.

Gotō was promoted to captain on 15 November 1933. He was assigned as commander of Destroyer Group 10, followed by captain of the cruisers Naka, Atago, Chōkai, and battleships Mutsu and Yamashiro.

Gotō became a rear admiral on 15 November 1939 and was made commander of Cruiser Division 2. On 10 September 1941 he was placed in command of Cruiser Division 6 (CruDiv6), consisting of the four heavy cruisers Aoba (Gotō's flagship), Furutaka, Kinugasa and Kako.

== World War II ==
On 23 December 1941, CruDiv6 supported the second assault on Wake Island in which Japanese troops were able to capture the island after the intense Battle of Wake Island. In May 1942, from CruDiv6, Gotō commanded an element of the "Main Body Support Force," providing cover, along with the light aircraft carrier Shōhō, for the Operation Mo offensive, including landings on Tulagi and an attempted assault on Port Moresby, New Guinea that resulted in the Battle of the Coral Sea. During the battle, U.S. aircraft attacked and sank Shōhō, with Gotō's cruisers located too far away to provide anti-aircraft protection for the carrier, for the loss of Lexington.

Operating from Kavieng, New Ireland, and Rabaul, New Britain, Gotō's CruDiv6 supported Japanese naval operations during the first several months of the Guadalcanal campaign. CruDiv6, with other Japanese warships and under the overall command of Gunichi Mikawa, participated in the Battle of Savo Island on 8 August 1942 resulting in the sinking of four Allied cruisers. On the return trip to Kavieng, however, Kako was torpedoed and sunk. On 11 October, the remaining three cruisers of CruDiv6 approached Guadalcanal at night to bombard the Allied airbase at Henderson Field as well as to support a large "Tokyo Express" run occurring the same evening. Gotō's force was surprised by a force of American cruisers and destroyers under the command of U.S. Rear Admiral Norman Scott. In the resulting Battle of Cape Esperance, Gotō was mortally wounded onboard Aoba and died later on 12 October.
