= 358th =

358th may refer to:

- 358th Bombardment Squadron, inactive United States Air Force unit
- 358th Fighter Group, inactive United States Army Air Force unit
- 358th Fighter Squadron (358 FS), part of the 355th Fighter Wing at Davis-Monthan Air Force Base, Arizona

== See also ==
- 358 (number)
- 358, the year 358 (CCCLVIII) of the Julian calendar
- 358 BC
