= Tone-class cruiser =

Class of Japanese heavy cruisers

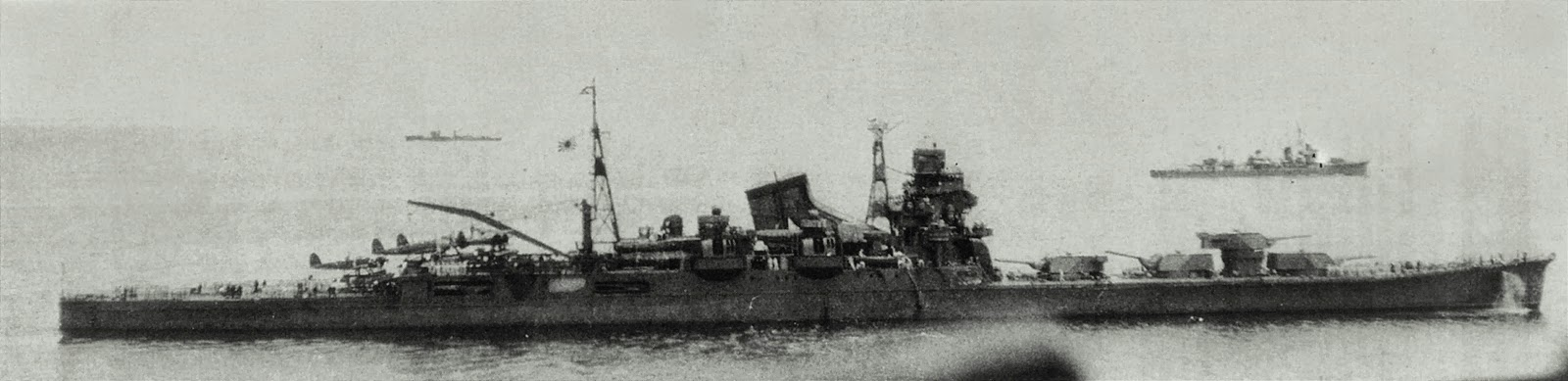
- Tone-class heavy cruiser

Class overview
- Name: Tone class
- Builders: Mitsubishi Heavy Industries, Nagasaki
- Operators: Imperial Japanese Navy
- Preceded by: Mogami class
- Succeeded by: Ibuki class
- Planned: 2
- Completed: 2
- Lost: 2

General characteristics
- Type: Heavy cruiser
- Displacement: 11,213 tons (11,392 tonnes) (standard load); 15,200 tons (15,443 tonnes) (full load)
- Length: 201.6 m (661 ft 5 in)
- Beam: 19.4 m (63 ft 8 in)
- Draught: 6.2 m (20 ft 4 in)
- Propulsion: 4 shaft Gihon geared turbines; 8 boilers; 152,000 shp (113,000 kW)
- Speed: 35 knots (65 km/h; 40 mph)
- Range: 8,000 nautical miles (15,000 km; 9,200 mi) at 18 knots (33 km/h; 21 mph)
- Armament: 8 × 203 mm (8 in)/50 guns (4 x 2); 8 × 127 mm (5 in)/40 guns (4 x 2), 12 × Type 96 25 mm (0.98 in) AA guns (6 x 2); 12 × 610 mm torpedo tubes (4 x 3)
- Armour: 145 mm (5.7 in) (belt); 65–30 mm (2.6–1.2 in) (deck)
- Aircraft carried: 6 x floatplanes
- Aviation facilities: 2 catapults

The two Tone-class cruisers (利根型巡洋艦, Tone-gata jun'yōkan) were the last heavy cruisers completed for the Imperial Japanese Navy. The Tone-class cruisers were originally envisaged as the 5th and 6th vessels in the Mogami class. However, by the time construction began, serious weaknesses in the Mogami-class hull design had become clear following the Fourth Fleet incident in 1935. As Japan was no longer obligated to abide by the limitations of the London Naval Treaty, a new design was created and new means of construction were utilized. Although the external dimensions were close to the Mogami class, the design was quite different, with all the main battery of guns placed forward of the bridge, reserving the entire stern area as a large seaplane operations deck. Unlike the U.S. Navy, the Japanese did not have a dual role attack/scout aircraft, nor did they assign any of their carrier aircraft to a reconnaissance role. Little emphasis was placed on this aspect of carrier warfare. Instead the Japanese reserved all of their carrier aircraft for attack roles. Reconnaissance then was relegated to the float planes carried by cruisers. The Tone and the Chikuma were intended to provide the long range reconnaissance needed for Japan's carrier Air Fleets.

== Design ==
=== Overview ===
The Tone-class cruisers had a very distinctive silhouette, with all main armament concentrated forward and the aft section entirely devoted to aircraft operations. This allowed for strong and compact protection of the magazines while also increasing and improving the living quarters aft.

=== Armament ===
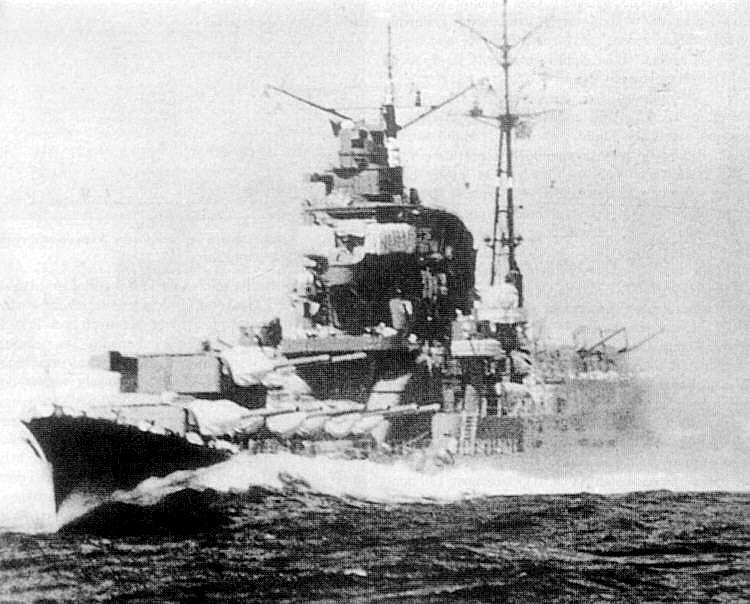
Chikuma with turrets trained to port

As originally planned, the Tone-class vessels were to have five triple 155 mm (6 in) turrets, three forward and two aft. However, the capsizing of the torpedo boat Tomozuru called into question the stability of all Japanese warship designs. As a result of the redesign, and to improve accuracy of gunfire, all five turrets in the new design were concentrated on the forecastle. When Japan abrogated the Washington Naval Treaty on 31 December 1936, the main armament was revised to eight 203 mm (8 in) guns in four twin turrets with maximum 55-degree elevation, as was installed on the Mogami-class vessels. No. 1 was forward firing, No. 3 and No. 4 turrets trained through after arcs, while No. 2 was on a superfiring pedestal mounting overlooking No.1 and No.3.

Heavy anti-aircraft weaponry consisted of four twin 127 mm (5 in) gun turrets in shielded mountings amidships. For close-range, six twin Type 96 25 mm AT/AA Guns were carried. Four triple banks of 610 mm (24 in) torpedo tubes were also incorporated.

=== Hull and armor ===
The previous Mogami class experimented with welded hulls, with limited success. Thus the lead vessel in the Tone class, Tone, also had some welding, the subsequent Chikuma was an all riveted design. The undulating hull of earlier cruisers was dispensed with and the superstructure was less built-up. The modifications to the design raised the nominal displacement to about 12,500 tons. The main belt armor was 150 mm (5.9 in) thick next to machinery spaces (225 mm (8.9 in) next to magazines), and it extended to a depth of about 9 feet (2.7 m), beyond which it had a much reduced thickness as an anti-torpedo bulkhead down to the inner double bottom.

=== Engines ===
The main engines of the Tone class were similar to that of Suzuya and Kumano.

=== Aircraft ===
The Tone class had no aircraft hangar, but there was a comprehensive arrangement of transport rails and turntables on the aircraft catapult and quarterdecks. Two gunpowder-propelled catapults were located on the beam abaft the mainmast. A maximum of four Kawanishi E7K2 "Alf" three-seat floatplanes and four Nakajima E8N1 "Dave" floatplanes could be carried, the normal complement being six, of which four were to be E8N1s. In practice, no more than five were ever embarked. As the war progressed, these types were superseded by the Aichi E13A1 "Jake" and Mitsubishi F1M2 "Pete".

== Modifications ==
In 1943, the number of 25 mm guns was increased to twenty, and in June 1944, when the opportunity to use their aircraft had passed, further mountings were added on the flight deck, bringing the light anti-aircraft total to 54 barrels. Two more twin 25 mm guns were also added later. Radar was fitted, but otherwise no major modifications were carried out.

== Ships in class ==
Two ships were funded under the 1932 2nd Supplementary Budget, both of which were built by Mitsubishi at the Nagasaki shipyards.

=== Tone ===
Tone (利根) was part of the covering force for the attack on Pearl Harbor, and later that same month assisted in the second Battle of Wake Island. Subsequently, Tone was involved in operations in the Netherlands East Indies. In February 1942, she was part of the covering force for the carrier raid on Darwin, and in March accompanied the battleships Hiei and Kirishima in the sinking of the destroyer USS Edsall. During March Tone participated in the strike by Admiral Nagumo's aircraft carrier force into the Indian Ocean and the attack on Ceylon. Tone returned to the Pacific for the Battle of Midway in May, and from the summer of 1942 was part of the Guadalcanal campaign. In 1943, Tone patrolled in Solomon Islands theatre where she was damaged by an air raid on the base in Rabaul on 5 November. In the beginning of 1944, Tone participated in a strike into the Indian Ocean against Allied shipping on the Australia-Aden route. Later, Tone was in the Battle of the Philippine Sea, and as part of Admiral Kurita's Center Force at the Battle of Leyte Gulf attacked US escort aircraft carriers. Tone was damaged by US aircraft in March 1945, after her return to home waters and was finally sunk by aircraft, near Kure, on 24 July 1945. She was raised postwar and broken up at Kure in 1948.

=== Chikuma ===
The career of Chikuma (筑摩) parallels that of Tone in almost every detail, since the two ships formed the 8th Cruiser Squadron on completion and operated together for almost all of their careers. In October 1942, during the Battle of the Santa Cruz Islands, Chikuma was hit by five bombs dropped by aircraft from the carrier USS Hornet. Chikuma was lost in the Battle off Samar on 25 October 1944.

Construction data
Name	Subclass	Builder	Laid down	Launched	Commissioned	Fate
Tone	Tone	Mitsubishi Heavy Industries, Nagasaki Yard	1 Dec 1934	21 Nov 1937	20 Nov 1938	Sunk durig the attacks on Kure and the Seto Inland Sea, 24 Jul 1945
Chikuma	Tone	Mitsubishi Heavy Industries, Nagasaki Yard	1 Oct 1935	19 Mar 1938	20 May 1939	Sunk during the Battle off Samar, 25 Oct 1944
