= Naomasa Sakonju =

Japanese officer, war criminal 1890-1948

- 左近允 尚正
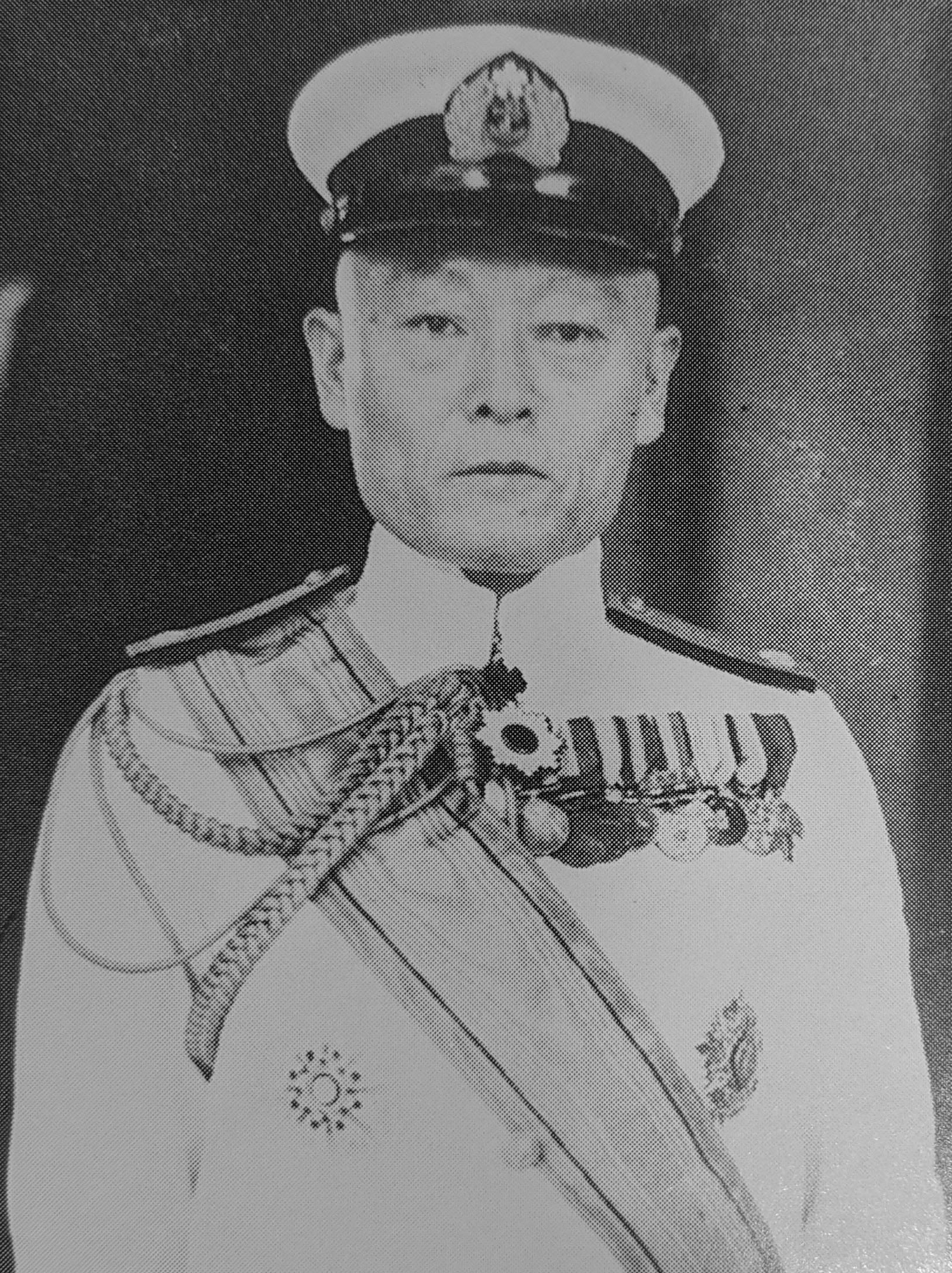
- Born: June 6, 1890; Kagoshima Prefecture, Japan
- Died: January 21, 1948 (aged 57); Stanley Prison, British Hong Kong
- Education: Imperial Japanese Navy Academy
- Military career
- Allegiance: Empire of Japan
- Branch: Imperial Japanese Navy
- Service years: 1912–1945
- Rank: Vice Admiral
- Units: Soya, Suwo, Hashidate, Kasuga, Niitaka, Azuma, Harukaze, Tenryū, Mutsu, Wakamiya, Kako
- Commands: Cruiser Division 16; China Area Fleet
- Conflicts: World War II; Pacific War; Indian Ocean raid
- Other work: Naval Attaché to Thailand

Naomasa Sakonju (左近允 尚正, Sakonjō Naomasa; June 6, 1890 – January 21, 1948) was a vice admiral in the Imperial Japanese Navy during World War II and a convicted war criminal.

== Biography ==
A native of Kagoshima Prefecture, Sakonju was a graduate of the 40th class of the Imperial Japanese Navy Academy in 1912, placing 98th in a class of 144. He served his midshipman tour on the cruiser Soya, and battleship Suwo, and after commissioning as an ensign was assigned to Hashidate.

As a sub-lieutenant he served on the Kasuga, Niitaka, Azuma, and destroyer Harukaze.

After his promotion to lieutenant on 1 December 1919, he was assigned to the Tenryū, served a year as communications officer on Chichijima in the Ogasawara Islands, and returned to serve as communications officer on Mutsu, and seaplane tender Wakamiya. He was promoted to lieutenant commander in 1930, and was executive officer of the Kako in 1933. He held numerous staff positions thereafter, including that of naval attaché to Thailand from 1 September 1941.

He was promoted to rear admiral on 15 October 1941, and continued to remain in Thailand until July 1943.

He was assigned as commanding officer of the Cruiser Division 16 in September 1943, with the heavy cruiser Aoba as his flagship. CruDiv16 played an important role during many naval battles of World War II.

In March 1944, CruDiv 16 was engaged in raiding Allied shipping (Operation SA No.1) between Aden and Fremantle. The 6,100-ton British steamer MV Behar, crewed mostly by Indian seamen, was sunk about midway between Ceylon and Fremantle on 9 March 1944. Following this attack, the squadron broke off its mission and returned to Batavia, as it was feared that Allied ships responding to the Behar's distress signal posed an unacceptable risk. The cruiser Tone took 114 survivors aboard. Admiral Sakonju directed that the prisoners should be "disposed of". Captain Haruo Mayuzumi on Tone requested clarification, and then requested clemency for the prisoners, at sea and again at anchor off Batavia. Sakonju again ordered that the prisoners should be eliminated, except for any specialists of intelligence value. Mayuzumi disembarked the women and some of the Indian crews first, then set out and carried out the order of executing the crews at sea during the night. Those killed included 10 of 14 officers on the MV Behar, and most of the Indian and British crew. The number of executed is reputed to be between 65 and at least 100.

Promoted to vice admiral on 15 October 1944, Sakonju became chief of staff of the China Area Fleet, remaining in that post until the war's end in 1945.

In 1946, Sakonju was arrested by the American occupation authorities and extradited to Hong Kong, where he was charged with war crimes by a British military tribunal over his role in the murder of the survivors of the Behar. Captain Mayuzumi was charged alongside him. Sakonju took responsibility in his 1947 affidavit. "In view of the fact that the Allies are lately killing Japanese prisoners of war at Guadalcanal by running tanks over them and are often bombing and torpedoing Japanese hospital ships, causing many casualties, the H.Q. came to a conclusion that the Allies are aiming at the reduction of Japan's manpower, and H.Q. decided to retaliate." Sakonju's other defense was that "he ordered the execution during the operation, not after it" (The raiding operation had already concluded when the Tone's skipper executed his British charges) while Mazuyumi's defense was that he was carrying out Sakonju's orders. Mayuzumi received a 7-year sentence (partially for his attempt to receive an amendment to Sakonju's order). Sakonju was sentenced to death, and hanged in January 1948. Sakonju's remains and belongings were not given to his family.

=== Family ===
Sakonju's two sons followed him into the navy. Masafumi Sakonju graduated eighth of 342 cadets in the Naval Academy's 69th Class, and was killed in action as gunnery officer of the destroyer Shimakaze on 11 November 1944; he was promoted posthumously to lieutenant commander. Naotoshi Sakonju graduated 75th out of 625 cadets in the Naval Academy's 72nd Class. He served aboard the heavy cruiser Kumano until it was sunk, then on 15 March 1945 was appointed as an officer on the freshly commissioned Matsu-class destroyer Nashi (later Wakaba in postwar JMSDF service) until it was heavily damaged by air attack on 28 July. He ended the war as a lieutenant and the navigator of the destroyer Hatsuzakura, joined the Japanese Maritime Self-Defense Force after the war, and died on 30 June 2013. Naotoshi managed to secretly visit Stanley Prison where Naomasa was incarcerated after the war, with the help of Japanese Hong Kong consul Atsuyuki Sasa.
