= Indian Ocean campaign =

Indian Ocean campaign may refer to:

- Ottoman naval expeditions in the Indian Ocean (1538–54)
- Linois's expedition to the Indian Ocean (1803–6)
- Mauritius campaign of 1809–1811
- Andaman Islands Expedition (1867)
- Indian Ocean in World War II
  - Indian Ocean raid (1942)
  - Indian Ocean raid (1944)
