= Japanese cruiser Tone (1937) =

Lead ship of the Tone-class heavy cruisers

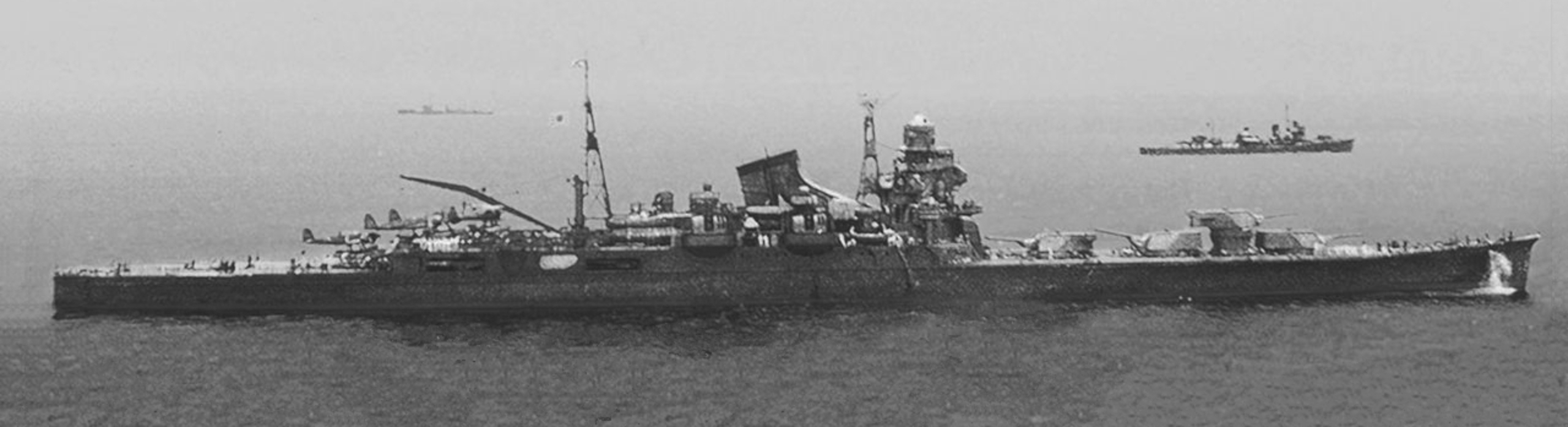
- Tone anchored in Hashirajima shortly before the battle of Midway, 27 May 1942, taken from battleship Hiei. The destroyer Urakaze is seen behind her

History

Empire of Japan
- Name: Tone
- Namesake: Tone River
- Ordered: 1932 Fiscal Year
- Builder: Mitsubishi
- Laid down: 1 December 1934
- Launched: 21 November 1937
- Commissioned: 20 November 1938
- Stricken: 20 November 1945
- Fate: Sunk 24 July 1945 by USN aircraft at Kure, Hiroshima 34°14′N 132°30′E. Raised postwar and broken up at Kure in 1948.

General characteristics
- Class & type: Tone-class heavy cruiser
- Displacement: 11,213 tons (standard); 15,443 (final)
- Length: 201.6 m (661 ft 5 in)
- Beam: 19.4 m (63 ft 8 in)
- Draught: 6.2 m (20 ft 4 in)
- Propulsion: Gihon geared turbines; 8 oil-fired boilers; 152,000 shp (113,000 kW); 4 shafts
- Speed: 35-knot (65 km/h)
- Range: 8,000 nmi (15,000 km) at 18 knots (33 km/h)
- Complement: 874
- Armament: 8 × 20cm/50 caliber Type 3 (4x2); 8 × 127 mm (5 in)/40 guns; 12 × Type 96 25 mm (0.98 in) AA guns (6x2); 12 × 610 mm (24 in) torpedo tubes (4x3)
- Armor: 100 mm (3.9 in) (belt); 65–30 mm (2.6–1.2 in) (deck)
- Aircraft carried: 6 x Aichi E13A floatplanes

Tone (利根) was the lead ship in the two-vessel Tone class of heavy cruisers in the Imperial Japanese Navy. The ship was named after the Tone River, in the Kantō region of Japan and was completed on 20 November 1938 at Mitsubishi's Nagasaki shipyards. Tone was designed for long-range scouting missions and had a large seaplane capacity. She was extensively employed during World War II usually providing scouting services to their aircraft carrier task forces. She almost always operated in this capacity in conjunction with her sister ship Chikuma. She was involved in sinking the destroyer USS Edsall in the Java Sea, before escorting aircraft carriers at the Indian Ocean Raid and battles of Midway, Eastern Solomons, and Santa Cruz throughout 1942.

In 1944, Tone sank the British steamship Behar, and committed a war crime when between 60 and 80 civilians were murdered aboard the ship. At the battle of Leyte Gulf, Tone survived several bomb hits from US aircraft and in turn fought Taffy 3 where she mostly operated alongside the heavy cruiser Haguro, together crippling the escort carrier USS Kalinin Bay and damaging the escort carrier USS Fanshaw Bay. Near the end of the war, Tone was sunk in port by US carrier aircraft and scrapped post war.

== World War II ==
=== Early Pacific War ===
At the end of 1941, Tone was assigned to CruDiv 8 with her sister ship, Chikuma, and was thus present during the attack on Pearl Harbor. That day, 7 December 1941, Tone and Chikuma each launched one Aichi E13A1 "Jake" floatplane for a final weather reconnaissance over Oahu. At 0630, Tone and Chikuma each launched short-range Nakajima E4N2 Type 90-2 reconnaissance seaplanes to act as pickets and patrol south of the Striking Force. Tone's floatplane flew to Lahaina, but found no American fleet units present.

On 16 December, CruDiv 8 was ordered to assist in the second attempted invasion of Wake Island. Tone launched two Nakajima E8N "Daves" for anti-submarine patrols. After the fall of Wake Island, CruDiv 8 returned to Kure, Hiroshima. By 14 January 1942, CruDiv 8 was based out of Truk in the Caroline Islands, and covered the landings of Japanese troops at Rabaul, New Britain as well as attacks on Lae and Salamaua, New Guinea. On 24 January, Tone's floatplanes attacked the Admiralty Islands. After 1 February air raid on Kwajalein by Vice Admiral William Halsey, Jr aboard the aircraft carrier Enterprise, Tone departed Truk with the Carrier Striking Force in an unsuccessful pursuit. Chikuma and Tone later participated in the Raid on Port Darwin, Australia on 19 February, which destroyed 15 aircraft and sank 11 ships. Tone launched a floatplane to report in weather conditions prior to the attack, but the plane's radio failed and it returned without reporting. Later, another floatplane had greater success, and shot down a PBY Catalina of the RAAF.

=== Battle of the Java Sea ===
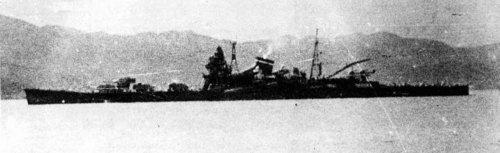
Tone at anchor in 1939

On 1 March 1942, Tone spotted the old American destroyer Edsall, 250 miles (400 km) SSE of Christmas Island. Four days later, floatplanes from Tone and Chikuma took part on the strike against Tjilatjap. On 6 March, Tone rescued a British seaman who had been adrift since his ship had been sunk off Java on 27 February.

=== Indian Ocean Raids ===
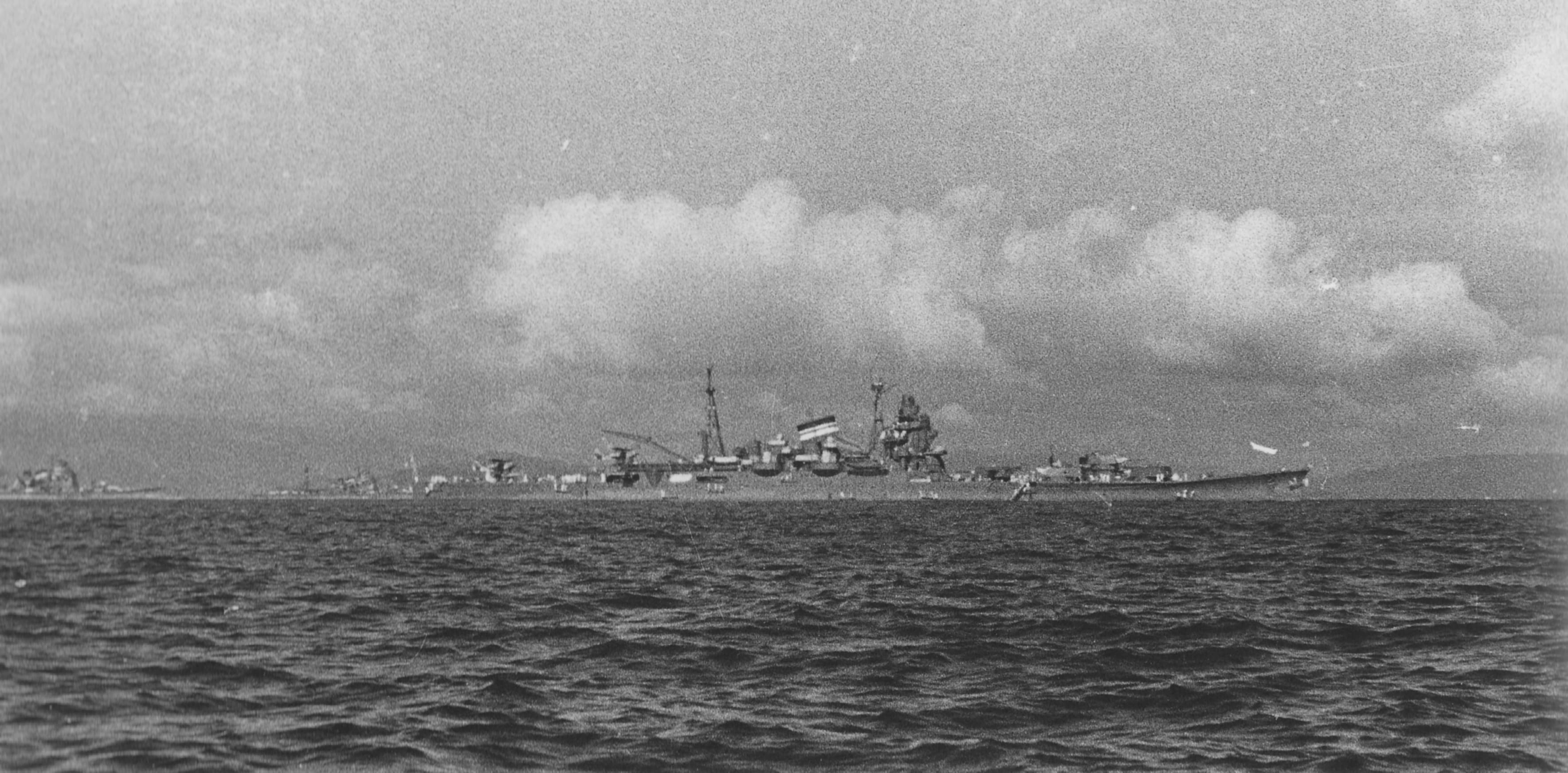
Tone at anchor in September 1940. The heavy cruisers Chōkai (right) and Maya (left) are seen behind her

On 5 April 1942, Tone was part of a major task force which launched 315 aircraft against British-held Colombo, Ceylon. The old destroyer HMS Tenedos, armed merchant cruiser Hector and 27 aircraft were destroyed and over 500 killed in harbor, while heavy cruisers HMS Cornwall and Dorsetshire were destroyed at sea. After searching for more remnants of the Royal Navy, the Indian Ocean Task Force launched 91 Aichi D3A1 "Val" dive-bombers and 41 Mitsubishi A6M2 "Zero" fighters on 9 April against the British naval base at Trincomalee, Ceylon. They found the harbor empty, but wrecked the base's facilities and shot down nine planes, and later sank the carrier HMS Hermes, destroyer HMAS Vampire, and corvette HMS Hollyhock, the oil tankers SS British Sergeant and SS Athelstane at sea 65 miles (105 km) from base.

Tone and the rest of the task force returned to Japan in mid-April 1942, when it was almost immediately assigned to the unsuccessful pursuit of Admiral Halsey's Task Force 16.2 with the aircraft carrier USS Hornet after the Doolittle Raid.

=== Battle of Midway ===
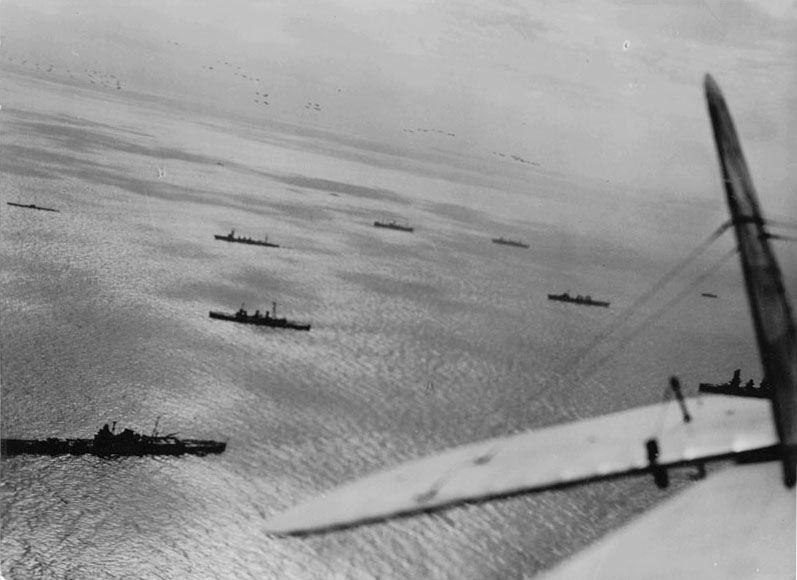
The Japanese fleet anchored off Yokohama for a fleet review, 11 October 1940. Tone is the heavy cruiser at the bottom left corner

At the crucial Battle of Midway, Tone and CruDiv 8 was part of Vice Admiral Chūichi Nagumo's Carrier Striking Force. On 4 June, Tone and Chikuma each launched two "Jakes" to search out 300 miles (480 km) for American carriers. Tone's floatplane discovered American ships, but owing to internal bureaucracy in their command structure its report was not immediately delivered to Admiral Nagumo. As a result, he had already ordered his aircraft to prepare for another attack on Midway before he received the report. Tone was attacked by enemy carrier aircraft during the battle, but sustained no damage, except the loss of a "Dave" with its crew. Chikuma and Tone were then detached to support Vice Admiral Boshiro Hosogaya's Aleutian invasion force. However, the anticipated American counter-attack failed to materialize. CruDiv 8 cruised northern waters uneventfully.

Rear Admiral Chuichi Hara assumed command of CruDiv 8 from 14 July 1942. With the US invasion of Guadalcanal, Chikuma and Tone were ordered south again on 16 August with the aircraft carriers Shōkaku, Zuikaku, Zuihō, Jun'yō, Hiyō and Ryūjō. They were joined by the battleships Hiei, Kirishima, seaplane tender Chitose, and cruisers Atago, Maya, Takao, Nagara.

=== Battle of the Eastern Solomons ===
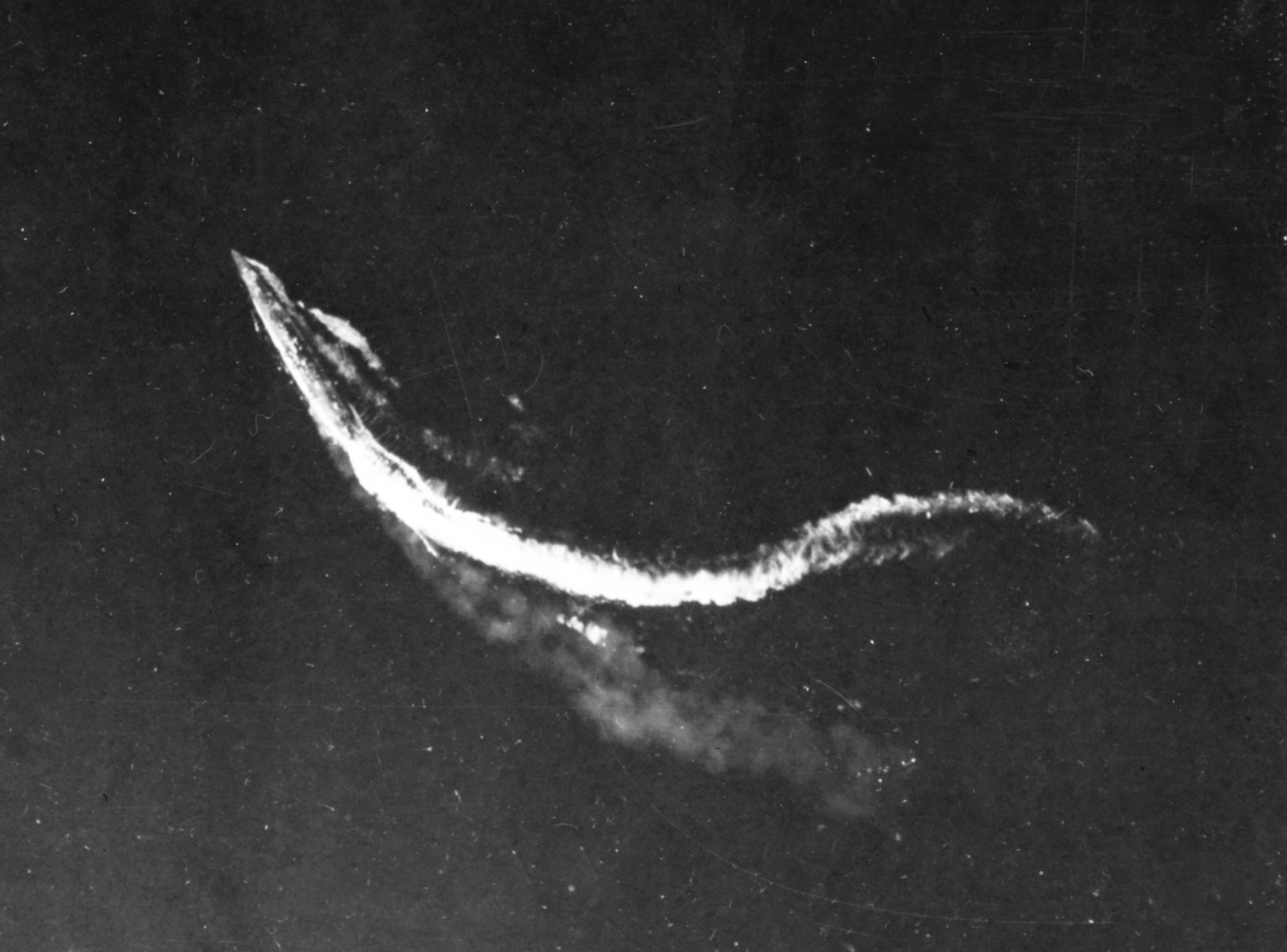
Tone maneuvering during the Battle of the Eastern Solomons, 24 August 1942

On 24 August 1942, CruDiv 7's Kumano and Suzuya arrived to join the reinforcement fleet for Guadalcanal. The following morning, a Consolidated PBY Catalina spotted Ryūjō, which Douglas SBD Dauntlesses and Grumman TBF Avengers from Enterprise unsuccessfully attacked. Seven floatplanes from Tone and Chikuma were launched to locate the American fleet. One of Chikuma's planes spotted the Americans, but was shot down before its report could be relayed. However, a second floatplane was more successful, and the Japanese launched an attack against Enterprise, hitting it with three bombs which set her wooden deck on fire. However, in the meantime, the Americans located the Japanese fleet, and Ryūjō was sunk by planes from the carrier Saratoga. Tone was attacked unsuccessfully by two Avengers whose Mark 13 torpedoes missed, returning to Truk safely.

=== Battle of Santa Cruz ===
Through October, Chikuma and Tone patrolled north of the Solomon Islands, awaiting word of recapture of Henderson Field by the Japanese. On 19 October, Tone (with the destroyer Teruzuki) was detached on an independent mission to scout for American ships. Both ships operated off the Santa Cruz Islands until a Kawanishi H6K "Emily" from Jaluit Atoll sighted a carrier off the New Hebrides. On 26 October 1942, 250 miles (400 km) northeast of Guadalcanal, Rear Admiral Hiroaki Abe's task force launched seven floatplanes to scout south of Guadalcanal. They located the American fleet, and Abe followed with an attack by carrier planes which sank the carrier Hornet and damaged the battleship South Dakota and cruiser San Juan. However, two of the four aircraft launched by Tone during the attack were shot down.

Tone supported Japanese reinforcement efforts at Guadalcanal through mid-November 1942, and was then assigned to patrols from its base in Truk through mid-February 1943. After returning to Maizuru for refit on 21 February, two additional twin-mount Type 96 25-mm AA guns were installed along with a Type 21 air-search radar. On 15 March 1943 Rear Admiral Kishi Fukuji assumed command of CruDiv 8, and Tone was ordered back to Truk. However, on 17 May, Chikuma and Tone were tasked to accompany battleship Musashi back to Tokyo for the state funeral of Admiral Isoroku Yamamoto. Tone was back in Truk by 15 July, having avoided numerous submarine attacks along the route. From July to November, Tone was engaged in making troop transport runs to Rabaul, and to patrols of the Marshall Islands in unsuccessful pursuit of the American fleet. While back at Kure on 6 November, Tone gained additional 25-mm AA guns, bringing its total to 20. CruDiv 8 was disbanded on 1 January 1944, and both Tone and Chikuma were reassigned to CruDiv 7 (with Suzuya and Kumano) under Rear Admiral Shoji Nishimura. Tone returned to Truk on 2 January. In February, Tone assisted with the evacuation of Japanese forces from Truk to Palau.

From 1 March 1944, Tone was assigned to commerce raiding in the Indian Ocean. On 9 March, Tone sank the British freighter Behar, taking aboard 108 survivors against orders. Of the survivors, 32 were disembarked as prisoners of war at Batavia. Admiral Naomasa Sakonju aboard the cruiser Aoba, ordered that the remaining prisoners be "disposed of", and they were taken out to sea and beheaded. (Following the war, Sakonju was executed for war crimes, including the murder of these prisoners, while the former commander of Tone, Captain Haruo Mayazumi, was sentenced to seven years imprisonment.) On 20 March 1944, Rear Admiral Kazutaka Shiraishi assumed command of CruDiv 7.

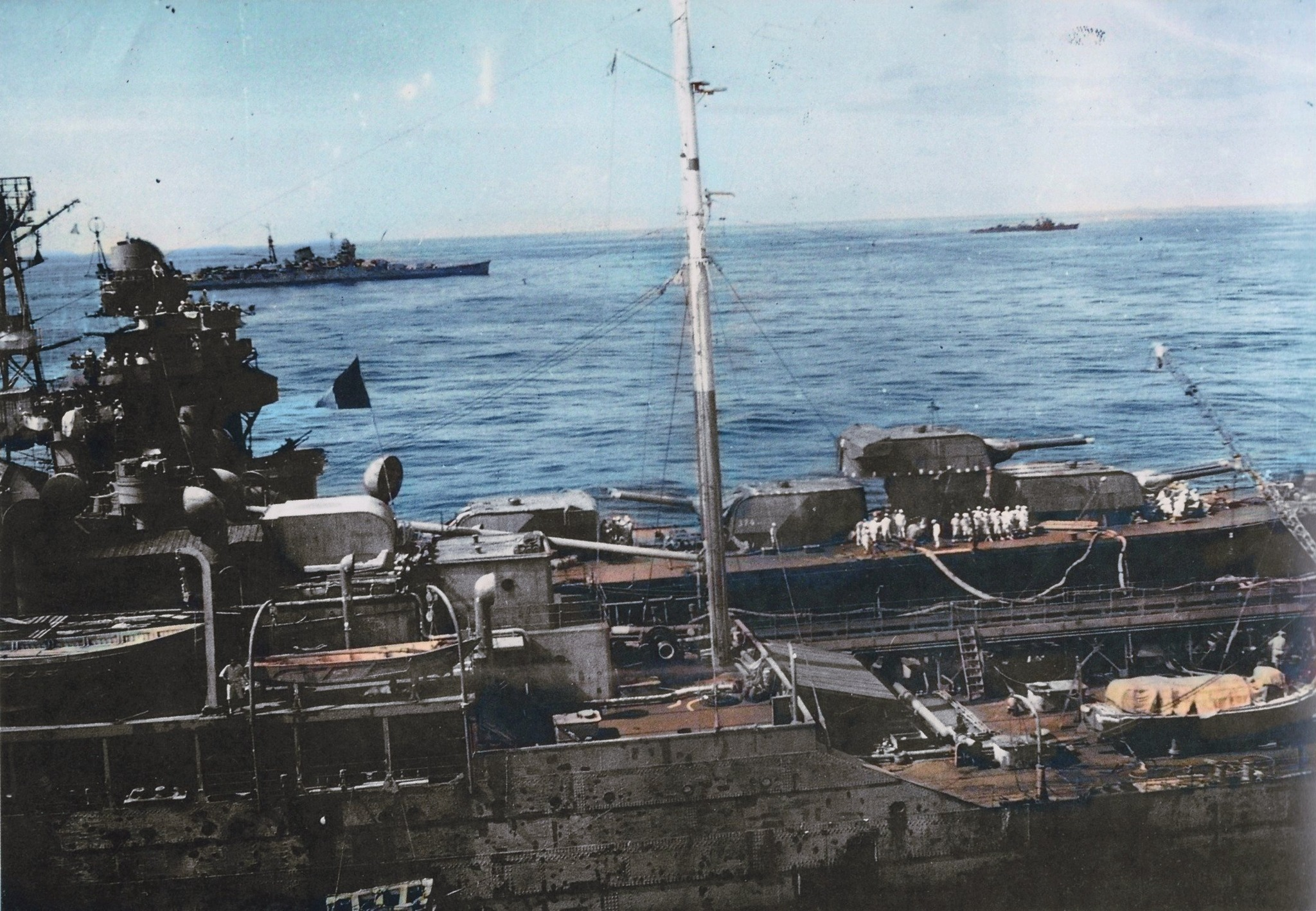
Tone refueling from the auxiliary oilier Kokuyō Maru shortly before the battle of the Philippine Sea, 17 June 1944. The heavy cruiser Suzuya and the destroyer Tamanami are seen in the distance

=== Battle of the Philippine Sea ===
On 13 June 1944, Admiral Soemu Toyoda activated "Operation A-GO" for the defense of the Mariana Islands. Tone was assigned to Force "C" of Vice Admiral Jisaburo Ozawa's Mobile Fleet, which proceeded through the Visayan Sea to the Philippine Sea headed towards Saipan. On 20 June, after the battleships Haruna, Kongō and carrier Chiyoda were attacked by aircraft from the carriers Bunker Hill, Monterey and Cabot and the bulk of the Japanese air cover was destroyed in the "Great Marianas Turkey Shoot", Tone retired with the Mobile Fleet to Okinawa, and from there to Kure. While at Kure from 26 June to 8 July 1944, Tone gained additional Type 96 25-mm AA, bringing its total to 57. Two new Type 22 surface-search radars and a Type 13 air-search radar were also fitted. After ferrying army troops to Okinawa, Tone was reassigned back to Singapore in July.

=== Battle of Leyte Gulf ===
On 23 October 1944, Tone along with the cruisers Kumano, Suzuya and Chikuma, sortied from Brunei towards the Philippines with Admiral Takeo Kurita's First Mobile Striking Force. The battle group was attacked by submarines while steaming through the Palawan Passage. The cruisers Atago and Maya were sunk, and Takao was damaged. As the force entered the Sibuyan Sea on 24 October, the Center Force suffered eleven raids by aircraft from the carriers of Task Group 38.2. Musashi was sunk and Tone was hit by bombs.

==== Battle off Samar ====
The following day during the Battle off Samar, Tone served in the fight against Taffy 3, a small US task force of six escort carriers, three destroyers, and four destroyer escorts. Tone started off the battle at 7:18 by engaging the destroyer USS Johnston, scoring no hits as in turn Johnston crippled the Kumano with 45 shell hits and a torpedo that blew off her bow, forcing her out of the battle alongside Suzuya to escort her. Shortly afterwards, she and Chikuma were attacked by American torpedo bombers at 7:30 and forced to break off from formation, and several minutes later change course to attack the escort carriers.

At 8:18, Tone joined the heavy cruiser Haguro in attacking the escort carrier USS Kalinin Bay, which from 18,000 yards, they successfully hit with three 8-inch (203 mm) shells. Simultaneously, aircraft strafing killed one sailor and injured several others. After Haguro was forced to disengage after being hit by two bombs and two 5-inch (127 mm) shells from Kalinin Bay, destroying her forward superfiring turret, Tone switched fire to the attacking destroyer USS Heermann, firing thirty 8-inch (203 mm) rounds and four torpedoes, straddling Heermann several times and forcing her to turn away. After Haguro had finished helping to sink the destroyer USS Hoel, she and Tone closed to 10,000 yards, and reengaged Kalinin Bay, crippling her with another eleven 8-inch (203 mm) shell hits, before Tone was forced to dodge air attacks from Taffy 2 and Taffy 3 aircraft during the same attacks that sank her sistership Chikuma with several torpedo hits, while separate air attacks sank the heavy cruisers Chōkai and Suzuya. By 8:55, Tone and Haguro took aim at the escort carrier USS Fanshaw Bay. Tone fired 28 rounds, hitting Fanshaw Bay with a single 8-inch (203 mm) shell, whilst Haguro struck the escort carrier with three 8-inch (203 mm) shells, starting a fire in her hangar bay and disabling her aircraft elevator.

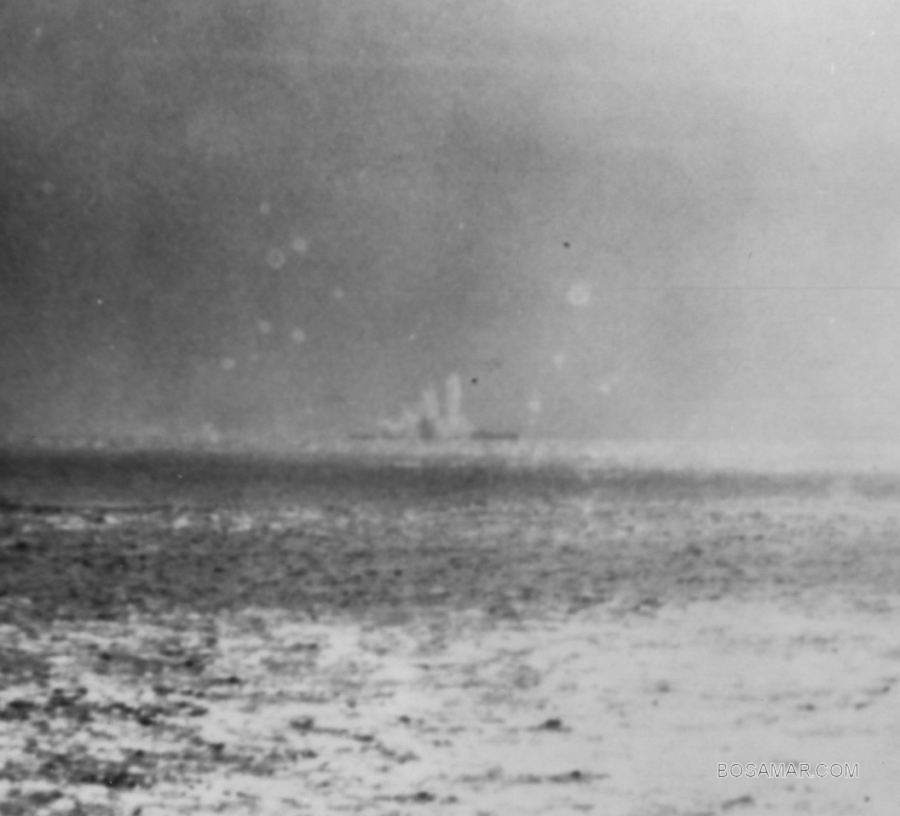
Bombs landing close to Tone during the Battle off Samar, 25 October 1944, as seen from the escort carrier USS White Plains.

With three heavy cruisers sunk and a fourth crippled, Admiral Kurita ordered a retreat from the battle, prompting Tone to disengage Taffy 3. While retreating, Tone was hit by two bombs from carrier aircraft, one was a dud, but the other disabled her steering wheel, forcing her crew to manually control the rudder. Throughout the next day, several aircraft raided Kurita's fleet, but Tone was not damaged and returned to Brunei on the 28th.

=== Drydock and use as a training ship ===
On 6 November, Tone departed Brunei towards Manila, and onward to Mako in the Pescadores and Kure. Back in dry dock in Maizuru, Tone gained four additional triple-mount 25-mm AA guns aft, bringing its total to 62. The Type 21 radar was replaced with a Type 22. CruDiv 7 was disbanded 21 November and Tone reassigned to CruDiv 5 with Kumano. Once repairs were completed on 18 February 1945, Tone relocated to Etajima, where it was moored for use as a training ship. It was slightly damaged in an air raid on 19 March.

=== Sinking during the bombing of Kure ===
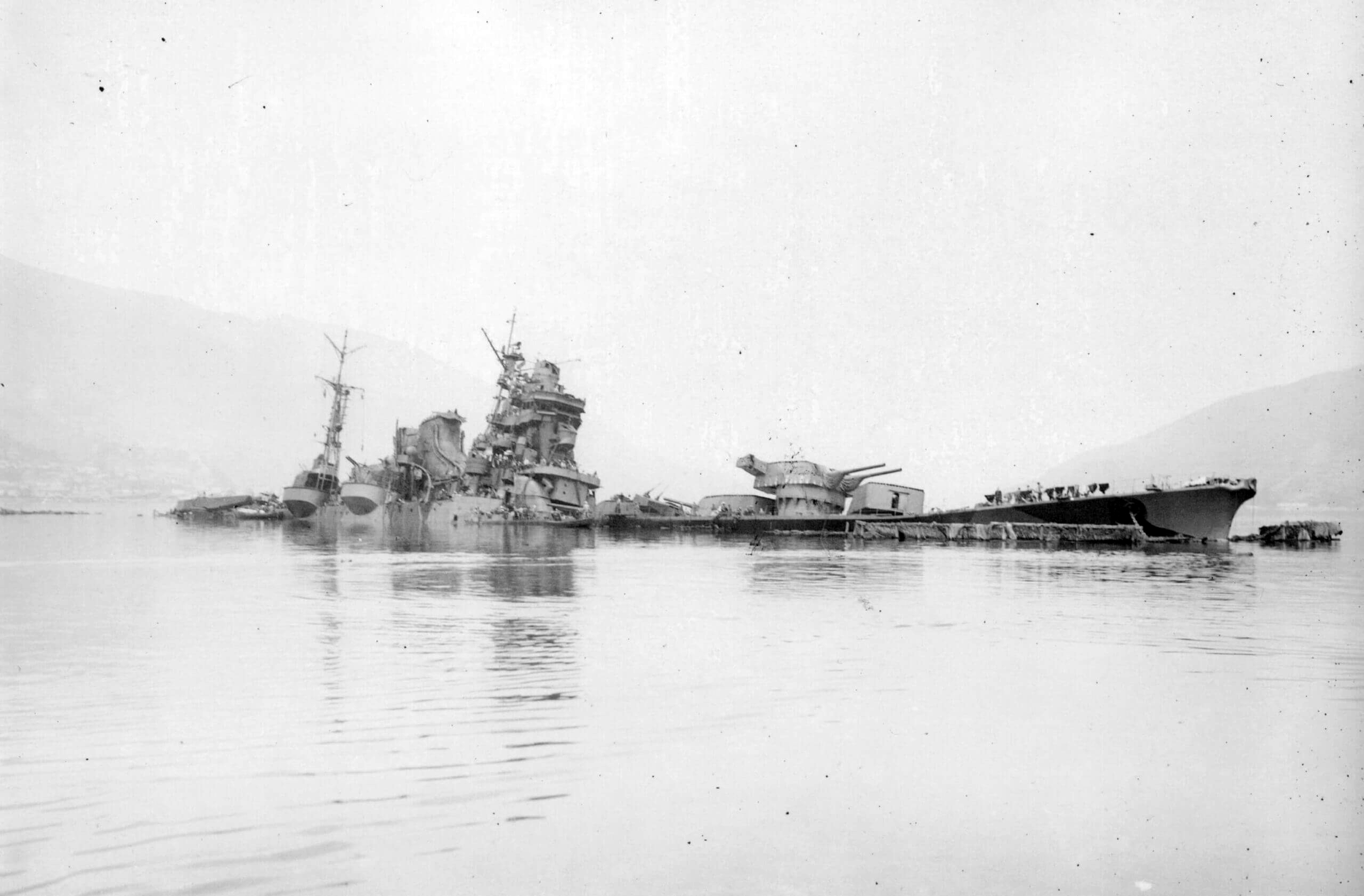
Tone sunk in Etajima Bay

On 24 July 1945, Task Force 38 launched a large air raid against Kure aimed at the final destruction of the Imperial Japanese Navy. Nine aircraft from the light carrier Monterey hit Tone with three bombs, causing her to settle to the bottom of the bay. The hulk was attacked again on 28 July by rockets and armor-piercing bombs dropped by planes from the carriers Wasp, Bataan and Ticonderoga. Tone was removed from the Navy List on 20 November 1945 and scrapped after the war from 1947 to 1948.
