= Japanese cruiser Chikuma (1938) =

Second ship of the Tone-class of Japanese heavy cruisers

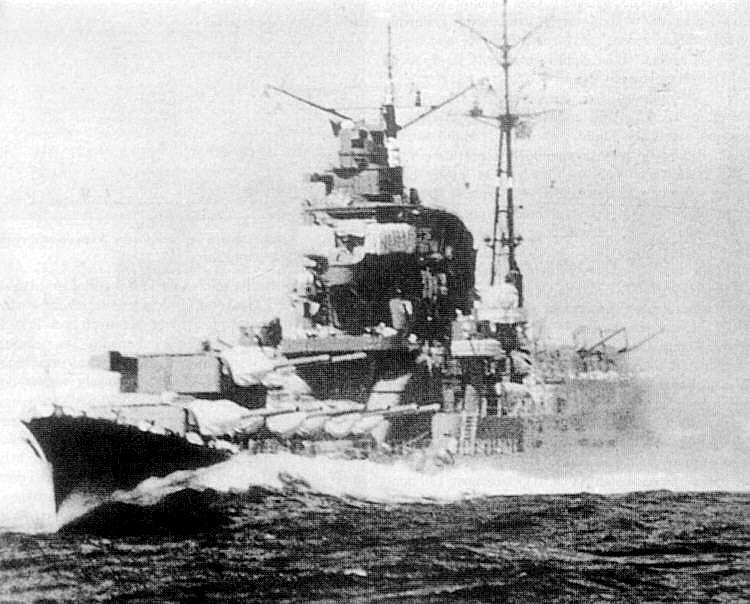
- Japanese heavy cruiser Chikuma

History

Japan
- Name: Chikuma
- Namesake: Chikuma River
- Ordered: 1932 fiscal year
- Builder: Mitsubishi
- Laid down: 1 October 1935
- Launched: 19 March 1938
- Commissioned: 20 May 1939
- Stricken: 20 April 1945
- Fate: Sank 25 October 1944

General characteristics
- Class & type: Tone-class cruiser
- Displacement: 11,213 tons (standard); 15,443 (final)
- Length: 201.6 m (661 ft 5 in)
- Beam: 19.4 m (63 ft 8 in)
- Draught: 6.2 m (20 ft 4 in)
- Propulsion: 4-shaft Gihon oil geared turbines; 8 boilers; 152,000 shp (113,000 kW)
- Speed: 35 knots (65 km/h)
- Range: 8,000 nmi (15,000 km) at 18 knots (33 km/h)
- Complement: 874
- Armament: 8 × 20 cm/50 3rd Year Type naval guns (4x2); 8 × 127 mm (5 in)/40 guns; 6 × Type 96 25 mm (0.98 in) AA guns; 12 × 610 mm (24-inch) torpedo tubes
- Armor: 100 mm (3.9 in) (belt); 65–30 mm (2.6–1.2 in) (deck)
- Aircraft carried: 6 x floatplanes

Chikuma (筑摩) was the second and last vessel in the Tone class of heavy cruisers in the Imperial Japanese Navy. The ship was named after the Chikuma River in Nagano Prefecture. Entering service in 1939, Chikuma saw battle during World War II in the Pacific, hunting small allied ships in the Indian Ocean and serving in many escorting missions throughout many large-scale aircraft carrier battles between Japan and the United States. On 25 October 1944, she served in the Battle off Samar where she damaged the destroyer USS Heermann before being crippled by gunfire from the destroyer escort USS Samuel B. Roberts and sunk by air attacks.

== Background ==
Chikuma was designed for long-range scouting missions and had a large seaplane capacity. She was extensively employed during World War II in conjunction with an aircraft carrier task force, or as part of a cruiser squadron with her sister ship, Tone.

The Tone-class cruisers were originally envisaged as the fifth and sixth vessels in the Mogami class. However, by the time construction began, serious weaknesses in the Mogami-class hull design had become clear following the Fourth Fleet Incident in 1935. As Japan no longer was obligated to abide by the limitations of the London Naval Treaty, a new design was created and new means of construction were utilized. Though the external dimensions were close to the Mogami class, the design was quite different, with four twin 203 mm (8-inch) main battery turrets placed forward of the bridge, the second super firing over the first, reserving the entire stern area as a large sea plane hangar. Unlike the United States Navy, the Japanese did not have a dual role attack/scout aircraft. No reconnaissance units were assigned to the Japanese carriers, and little emphasis was placed on this aspect of carrier warfare. Instead the Japanese reserved all of their carrier aircraft for attack roles. Reconnaissance was left up to float planes carried by cruisers. Chikuma was intended to provide the long range scout planes needed for their carrier Air Fleets.

Chikuma was equipped with the heaviest armor shipped on a Japanese cruiser. It consisted of a main belt 145 mm (5.7-inches) over the citadel, and 150 mm (5.9-inches) over the machinery. She also carried a deck 65 mm (2.55-inches) over the ammo, machinery, and steering spaces and 30 mm (1.2-inches) elsewhere. She was capable of 35 knots (65 km/h; 40 mph), and could cruise for 8,000 nautical miles (15,000 km; 9,200 mi) at 18 knots (33 km/h; 21 mph)

== Service career ==
=== Early career ===
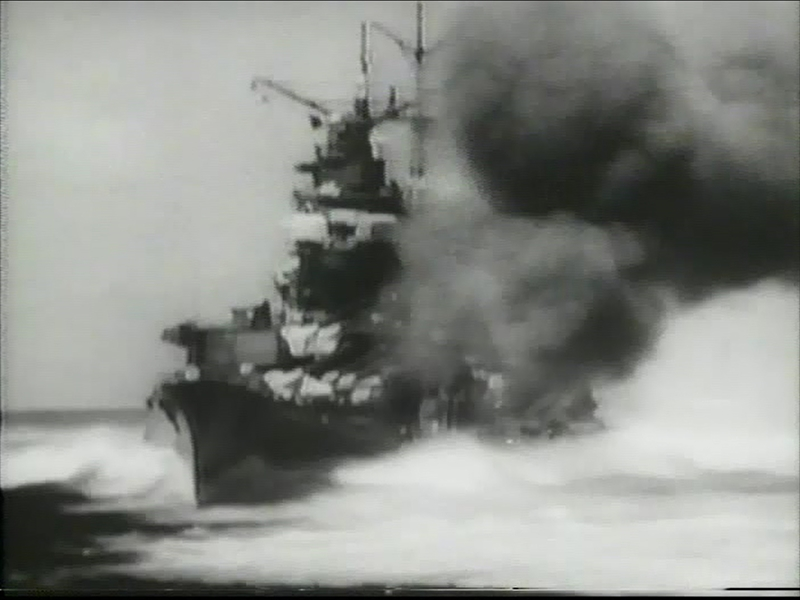
Chikuma firing her main guns, 1940

Chikuma was completed at Mitsubishi Nagasaki shipyards on 20 May 1939. After several months as a unit of the CruDiv6 (Sentai 6) of the Second Fleet, she was transferred to the CruDiv8 in November 1939. In addition to taking part in regular combat exercises in Japanese home waters, she operated off southern China on three occasions between March 1940 and March 1941.

=== Early stages of the Pacific War ===
At the end of 1941, Chikuma was assigned to CruDiv 8 with its sister ship, Tone, and was thus one of the key players in the attack on Pearl Harbor. On 7 December 1941, Tone and Chikuma each launched one Aichi E13A1 Type 0 "Jake" floatplane for a final weather reconnaissance over Oahu. At 0630, Tone and Chikuma each launched short range Nakajima E4N2 Type 90-2 Reconnaissance Seaplane to act as pickets and patrol south of the Striking Force. Chikuma's floatplane reported nine anchored American battleships. During the subsequent attack, the battleships Arizona, Oklahoma, West Virginia, and California were sunk and Nevada, Pennsylvania, Tennessee, Maryland and other smaller ships were damaged.

On 16 December, CruDiv 8 was ordered to assist in the second attempted invasion of Wake Island. Anti-aircraft fire damaged the scout plane from Chikuma, which was forced to ditch, but the crew was rescued. After the fall of Wake Island, CruDiv 8 returned to Kure.

On 14 January 1942, CruDiv 8 was based out of Truk in the Caroline Islands, and covered the landings of Japanese troops at Rabaul, New Britain and attacks on Lae and Salamaua, New Guinea. On 24 January Chikuma's floatplanes attacked the Admiralty Islands.

After the air raid on Kwajalein on 1 February by Vice Admiral William Halsey, Jr's aircraft carrier USS Enterprise, Chikuma departed Truk with the Carrier Striking Force in an unsuccessful pursuit. Chikuma and Tone later escorted carriers during the Raid on Port Darwin, Australia on 19 February, which sank 11 ships to air attacks. From 25 February 1942, Chikuma was involved in supporting the Japanese invasion of Java.

=== Surface actions ===
On 1 March 1942, Chikuma's floatplane located the 8,806-ton Dutch freighter Modjokerto attempting to escape from Tjilatjap to Australia, enabling a flotilla of destroyers to track the freighter down, with Kagerō, Shiranui, Kasumi, Isokaze, Ariake, and Yūgure shelling and sinking Modjokerto in three minutes. That afternoon, CruDiv 8's spotted the old destroyer USS Edsall, 250 miles (400 km) south-southeast of Christmas Island. Chikuma opened fire with her 8-inch guns at the extremely long range of 11 miles (18 km), and all shots missed. Chikuma was joined by battleships Hiei and Kirishima, which also opened fire with their 14-inch main batteries, but Edsall not only managed to avoid 297 14-inch, 132 6-inch shells from the battleships and an additional 844 8-inch and 62 5-inch rounds from the cruisers, but the destroyer also closed to range and fired its 4-inch guns at Chikuma. Hits from Hiei, Tone and dive bombers from the aircraft carriers Sōryū and Akagi finally stopped Edsall, which was then finished off by Chikuma. Chikuma rescued eight survivors of the sunken destroyer.

On 4 March, Chikuma and the destroyer Urakaze located and sank the 5,421-ton Dutch merchant Enggano (which had earlier been damaged by a floatplane from the cruiser Takao). On 5 March, floatplanes from Tone and Chikuma took part on the strike against Tjilatjap. After the surrender of the Dutch East Indies, Chikuma was assigned to Indian Ocean operations.

=== Indian Ocean raids ===
On 5 April 1942, Chikuma was part of a major task force which launched 315 aircraft against British-held Colombo, Ceylon. The old destroyer HMS Tenedos, armed merchant cruiser Hector and 27 aircraft were destroyed and over 500 killed in harbor, and the heavy cruisers HMS Cornwall and Dorsetshire were destroyed at sea. After searching for more remnants of the Royal Navy, the Indian Ocean Task Force launched 91 Aichi D3A1 "Val" dive-bombers and 41 Mitsubishi A6M2 "Zeke" fighters on 9 April against the British naval base at Trincomalee, Ceylon. They found the harbor empty, but wrecked the base's facilities and shot down nine planes, and later sank the carrier HMS Hermes, destroyer HMAS Vampire, and corvette HMS Hollyhock, the oil tankers SS British Sergeant and SS Athelstane at sea 65 miles (105 km) from base.

The task force with Chikuma returned to Japan in mid-April 1942, where it was almost immediately assigned to the unsuccessful pursuit of Admiral Halsey's Task Force 16.2 with the aircraft carrier USS Hornet after the Doolittle Raid.

=== Battle of Midway ===
At the crucial Battle of Midway, Chikuma and CruDiv 8 were in Vice Admiral Chuichi Nagumo's Carrier Striking Force. On 4 June, Tone and Chikuma each launched two Aichi E13A1 "Jake" long-range reconnaissance floatplanes to search out 300 miles (480 km) for American carriers. The floatplane from Tone discovered American ships, but did not recognize that the fleet was a carrier group, which proved to be a crucial mistake. Chikuma's floatplane found the aircraft carrier USS Yorktown, and shadowed the ship for the next three hours, guiding the bombers that attacked Yorktown that evening. Two other floatplanes from Chikuma continued to observe the heavily damaged Yorktown through the night, during which time one plane and crew were lost. Chikuma then directed the submarine I-168 to find and sink the Yorktown the following morning.

Chikuma and Tone were then detached to support Vice Admiral Boshiro Hosogaya's Aleutian invasion force. However, the anticipated American counter-attack failed to materialize. CruDiv 8 cruised northern waters uneventfully. Chikuma returned to Ominato port on 24 June.

Rear Admiral Chuichi Hara assumed command of CruDiv 8 from 14 July 1942. With the US invasion of Guadalcanal, Chikuma and Tone were ordered south again on 16 August with the aircraft carriers Shōkaku, Zuikaku, Zuihō, Jun'yō, Hiyō and Ryūjō. They were joined by the battleships Hiei, Kirishima, seaplane tender Chitose, and cruisers Atago, Maya, Takao, Nagara.

=== Battle of the Eastern Solomons ===
On 24 August 1942, CruDiv 7's Kumano and Suzuya arrived to join the reinforcement fleet for Guadalcanal. The following morning, a PBY Catalina seaplane spotted Ryūjō, which SBDs and TBFs from Enterprise unsuccessfully attacked. Seven floatplanes from Tone and Chikuma were launched to locate the American fleet. One of Chikuma's planes spotted the Americans, but was shot down before its report could be relayed. However, a second floatplane was more successful, and the Japanese launched an attack against Enterprise, hitting it with three bombs which set her wooden deck on fire. However, in the meantime, the Americans located the Japanese fleet, and Ryūjō was sunk by planes from the aircraft carrier USS Saratoga. Chikuma was undamaged in this engagement, and returned to Truk safely.

Through October, Chikuma and Tone patrolled north of the Solomon Islands, waiting word of recapture of Henderson Field by the Japanese.

=== Battle of Santa Cruz ===
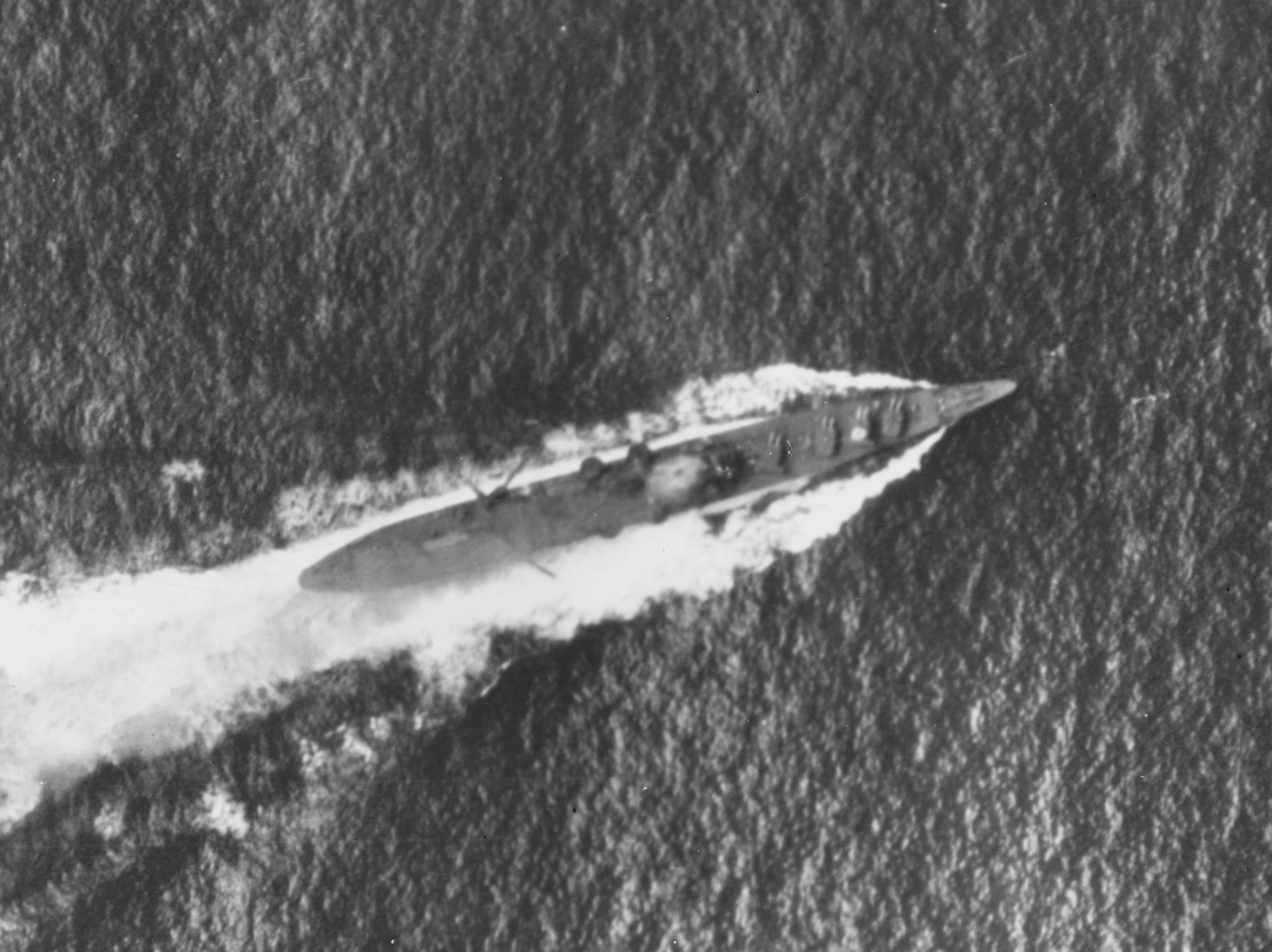
Chikuma under aerial attack during the Battle of Santa Cruz.

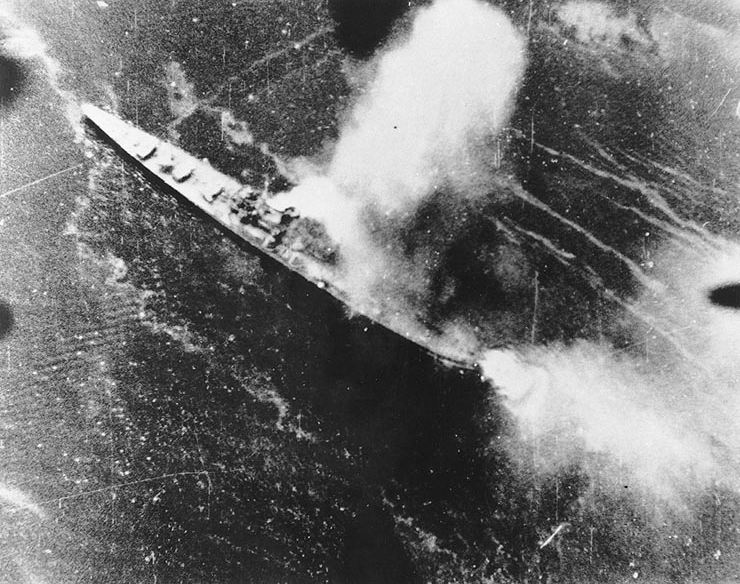
Chikuma being bombed in the attack on Rabaul, on 5 November 1943.

On 26 October 1942, 250 miles (400 km) northeast of Guadalcanal, Rear Admiral Hiroaki Abe's task force launched seven floatplanes to scout south of Guadalcanal. They located the American fleet, and Abe followed with an attack which sank Hornet and damaged the battleship South Dakota and cruiser San Juan. However, Chikuma was attacked by a Douglas SBD Dauntless dive-bomber from Hornet, and quick thinking crewmen jettisoned her torpedoes seconds before a 500 lb (230 kg) bomb hit her starboard forward torpedo room. She was also hit by two other bombs, destroying one floatplane on the aircraft catapult. Chikuma suffered 190 killed and 154 wounded including Captain Komura.

Chikuma (escorted by the destroyers Urakaze and Tanikaze) returned to Truk for emergency repairs and was then sent back to Kure with the damaged carrier Zuihō. During refit and repairs, two additional twin Type 96 25 mm AA guns and a Type 21 air-search radar were added. Repairs were completed by 27 February 1943.

On 15 March 1943 Rear Admiral Kishi Fukuji assumed command of CruDiv 8, and Chikuma was ordered back to Truk. However, on 17 May, Chikuma and Tone were tasked to accompany the battleship Musashi back to Tokyo for the state funeral of Admiral Isoroku Yamamoto. Chikuma was back in Truk by 15 July, having avoided numerous submarine attacks along the route.

From July to November, Chikuma was engaged in making troop transport runs to Rabaul, and to patrols of the Marshall Islands in unsuccessful pursuit of the American fleet. While refueling at Rabaul on 5 November 1943, Chikuma and its task force were attacked by 97 planes from the carriers Saratoga, and Princeton. Cruisers Atago, Takao, Maya, Mogami, Agano and Noshiro were damaged. Chikuma, attacked by a single SBD, suffered only near-misses with minor damage.

Back at Kure on 12 December, Chikuma gained additional 25-mm AA guns, bringing its total to 20. CruDiv 8 was disbanded on 1 January 1944, and both Tone and Chikuma were reassigned to CruDiv 7 (with Suzuya and Kumano) under Rear Admiral Shoji Nishimura. Refit completed by 1 February, Chikuma returned to Singapore on 13 February and Batavia on 15 March after a month of raiding commerce in the Indian Ocean. On 20 March 1944, Rear Admiral Kazutaka Shiraishi assumed command of CruDiv 7, and Chikuma was made flagship.

=== Battle of the Philippine Sea ===
On 13 June 1944, Admiral Soemu Toyoda activated "Operation A-GO" for the defense of the Mariana Islands. Chikuma was assigned to Force "C" Vice Admiral Jisaburo Ozawa's Mobile Fleet, which proceeded through the Visayan Sea to the Philippine Sea headed towards Saipan. On 20 June, after the battleships Haruna, Kongō and carrier Chiyoda were attacked by aircraft from the American carriers Bunker Hill, Monterey and Cabot and the bulk of the Japanese air cover was destroyed in the "Great Marianas Turkey Shoot", Chikuma retired with the Mobile Fleet to Okinawa.

After ferrying army troops to Okinawa, Chikuma was reassigned back to Singapore in July, serving as flagship for CruDiv 4 while Atago was under repairs.

=== Battle of Leyte Gulf ===
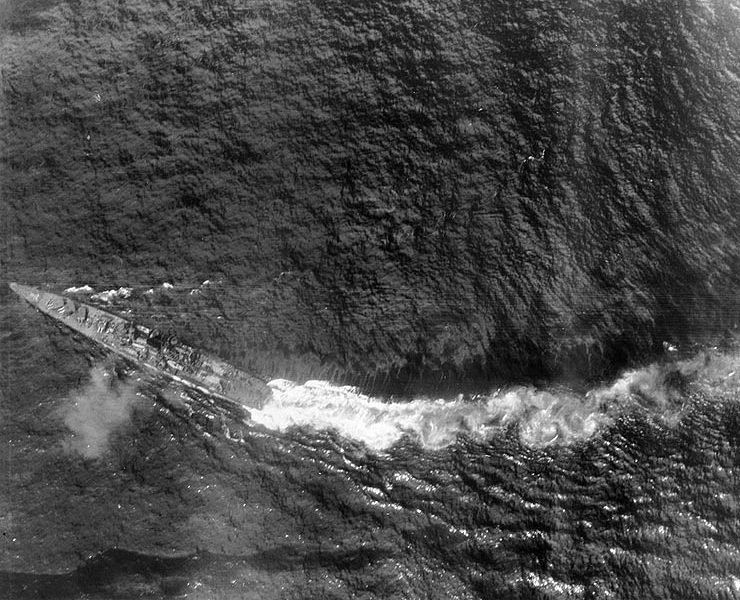
Chikuma under aerial attack during Battle off Samar in the Battle of Leyte Gulf, 25 October 1944. The ship's stern has been severely damaged by a torpedo hit, but the ship's outboard propellers are still keeping her somewhat moving.

On 23 October 1944, Chikuma (with Kumano, Suzuya and Tone) sortied from Brunei towards the Philippines with Vice Admiral Takeo Kurita's First Mobile Striking Force. In the Battle of the Palawan Passage, Atago and Maya were sunk by submarines, and Takao damaged. In the Battle of the Sibuyan Sea the following day Musashi was sunk, the cruiser Myōkō was crippled and had to be towed to safety, while the battleships Nagato and Haruna received damage.

On 25 October, during the Battle off Samar, Chikuma engaged U.S. escort carriers, destroyers, and destroyer escorts of Taffy 3. At 7:22, four torpedo bombers attacked Chikuma and Tone, forcing them to evade, then at 7:30 turned to engage the escort carriers. At 8:00, Chikuma took the escort carriers under fire, but a separate opponent stood its ground. The destroyer escort USS Samuel B. Roberts had closed to point blank range and fired her sole functioning 5-inch (127 mm) gun at 8:10, while the destroyer USS Heermann unloaded her main battery on the cruiser at a longer distance. Over the course of a half hour, Samuel B. Roberts ran out of high explosive shells and switched to armor pierce shells, then to training rounds, and finally depleting her star shells. Combined with gunfire from Heermann, Chikuma took around 200 5-inch (127 mm) shell hits, setting her ablaze. At 8:45, she managed a few hits on Heermann and assisted in crippling the destroyer and forcing her back, while Samuel B Roberts completely ran out of ammo and retired, later to be sunk by gunfire from the battleship Kongō.

==== Final moments and sinking ====
Heavily crippled, Chikuma disengaged, but was soon attacked by four TBM Avenger torpedo-bombers. An Avenger from Taffy 2 succeeded in hitting her stern port quarter with a Mark 13 torpedo that severed her stern and disabled her port screw and rudder. Chikuma's speed dropped to 18 knots (33 km/h), then to 9 knots (17 km/h), but more seriously, she became unsteerable. At 1105, Chikuma was attacked by five TBMs from USS Kitkun Bay. She was hit portside amidships by two torpedoes and her engine rooms flooded. At 1400, three TBMs from USS Ommaney Bay led by Lt. Joseph Cady dropped more torpedoes which hit Chikuma portside. Cady was later awarded the Navy Cross for his action. The destroyer Yukikaze was called to assist Chikuma, but she was ordered back as the destroyer Nowaki replaced her. It is generally thought Nowaki took off survivors from Chikuma, and then scuttled her at 11°25′N 126°36′E in the late morning of on 25 October 1944, but a more recent study suggests Chikuma sank from the effect of the air attack, and Nowaki only arrived in time to pick up survivors from the water.

On 26 October 1944, Nowaki was crippled by gunfire from the light cruisers USS Vincennes, Biloxi and Miami and finished off by a torpedo from DesDiv 103's destroyer USS Owen. The ship sank 65 miles (105 km) south-southeast of Legaspi, Philippines with about 1,400 men, including all Chikuma survivors. The sole survivor from Chikuma was a crew member who was not picked up by Nowaki and drifted ashore on his own, later to be captured by the US Navy.

Chikuma was removed from the navy list on 20 April 1945.
