= Japanese battleship Hiei =

Imperial Japanese Navy warship (1914–1942)

Coordinates: 9°04′S 159°45′E

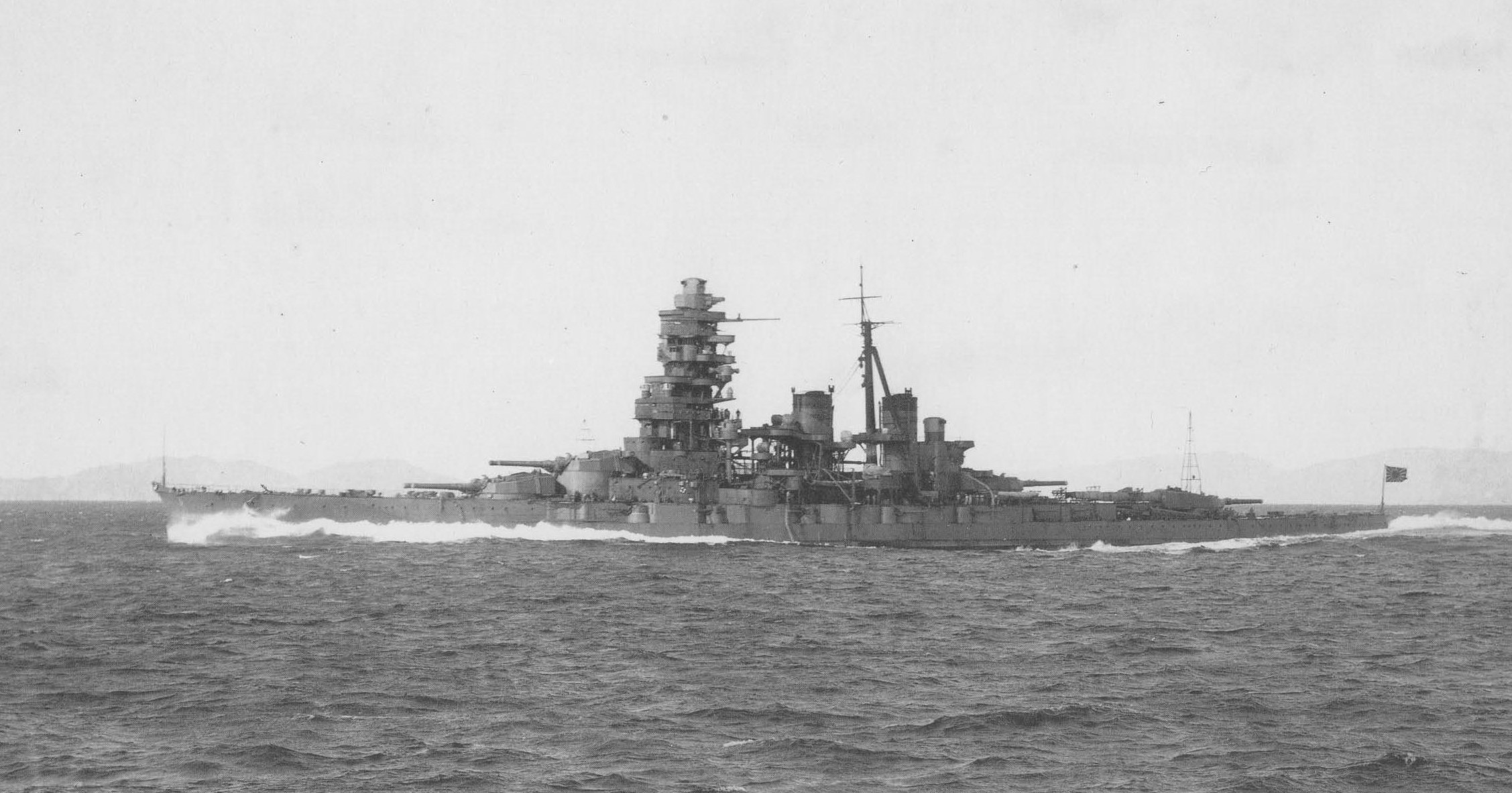
- Hiei undergoing sea trials off Tsukugewan after a refit, 5 December 1939

History

Japan
- Name: Hiei
- Namesake: Mount Hiei
- Ordered: 1911
- Builder: Yokosuka Naval Arsenal
- Laid down: 4 November 1911
- Launched: 21 November 1912
- Commissioned: 4 August 1914
- Fate: Sunk following the Naval Battle of Guadalcanal on 13 November 1942

General characteristics
- Class & type: Kongō-class battlecruiser
- Displacement: 36,600 long tons (37,187 t)
- Length: 222 m (728 ft 4 in)
- Beam: 31 m (101 ft 8 in)
- Draught: 9.7 m (31 ft 10 in)
- Propulsion: Steam turbines, 4 shafts
- Speed: 27.5 knots (31.6 mph; 50.9 km/h)
- Range: 10,000 nmi (19,000 km) at 14 kn (26 km/h)
- Complement: 1360
- Armament: As Built: 8 356 mm (14 in)/45 cal guns (4x2); 16 152 mm (6 in)/50 cal guns (16x1); 8 12-pounder (76 mm (3 in)) guns; 4 6.5 mm (0.26 in) machine guns; 8 submerged 533 mm (21 in) torpedo tubes (4x2); After 1937–1940 Refit: 8 356 mm (14 in)/45 cal guns (4x2); 14 152 mm (6 in) guns (14x1); 8 127 mm (5.0 in) DP guns (4x2); 20 1-inch (2.5 cm) Type 96 antiaircraft autocannons (10x2)
- Armor: Belt: 203 mm (8 in) (amidships); 76 mm (3 in) (ends); Deck: 69.85 mm (2.75 in); Bulkheads: 127 to 228.6 mm (5 to 9 in) (fore); 152 to 203 mm (6 to 8 in) (aft); Turrets: 228.6 mm (9 in); Conning Tower: 254 mm (10 in)

Hiei (Japanese: 比叡; named after Mount Hiei) was a warship of the Imperial Japanese Navy during World War I and World War II. Designed by British naval architect George Thurston, she was the second launched of four Kongō-class battlecruisers, among the most heavily armed ships in any navy when built. Laid down in 1911 at the Yokosuka Naval Arsenal, Hiei was formally commissioned in 1914. She patrolled off the Chinese coast on several occasions during World War I, and helped with rescue efforts following the 1923 Great Kantō earthquake.

Starting in 1929, Hiei was converted to a gunnery training ship to avoid being scrapped under the terms of the Washington Naval Treaty. She served as Emperor Hirohito's transport in the mid-1930s. After the treaty fell apart in 1937, she underwent a full-scale reconstruction that completely rebuilt her superstructure, upgraded her powerplant, and equipped her with launch catapults for floatplanes. Now fast enough to accompany Japan's growing fleet of aircraft carriers, she was reclassified as a fast battleship. On the eve of the US entry into World War II, she sailed as part of Vice-Admiral Chuichi Nagumo's Combined Fleet, escorting the six carriers that attacked Pearl Harbor on 7 December 1941.

As part of the Third Battleship Division, Hiei participated in many of the Imperial Japanese Navy's early actions in 1942, providing support for the invasion of the Dutch East Indies (now Indonesia) as well as the Indian Ocean raid of April 1942. During the Battle of Midway, she sailed in the Invasion Force under Admiral Nobutake Kondō, before being redeployed to the Solomon Islands during the Battle of Guadalcanal. She escorted Japanese carrier forces during the battles of the Eastern Solomons and Santa Cruz Islands, before sailing as part of a bombardment force under Admiral Kondō during the Naval Battle of Guadalcanal. In the early hours of 13 November 1942, Hiei engaged American cruisers and destroyers alongside her sister ship Kirishima. After helping to sink the light cruiser USS Atlanta and the destroyer USS Monssen, damage numerous other warships, and help to kill two admirals, Hiei was crippled by shell hits from the heavy cruiser USS San Francisco that jammed her rudder. Subjected to a daylight air attack from Henderson Field and the aircraft carrier USS Enterprise, she was scuttled on the evening of 13 November 1942.

== Design and construction ==
Hiei was the second of the Imperial Japanese Navy's Kongō-class battlecruisers, a line of capital ships designed by the British naval architect George Thurston. The class was ordered in 1910 in the Japanese Emergency Naval Expansion Bill after the commissioning of HMS Invincible in 1908. The four battlecruisers of the Kongō class were designed to match the naval capabilities of the other major powers at the time; they have been called the battlecruiser versions of the British (formerly Turkish) battleship HMS Erin. With their heavy armament and armor protection (the latter of which made up 23.3% of their approximately 30,000 ton displacement), Hiei and her sister ships were vastly superior to any other Japanese capital ship afloat at the time.

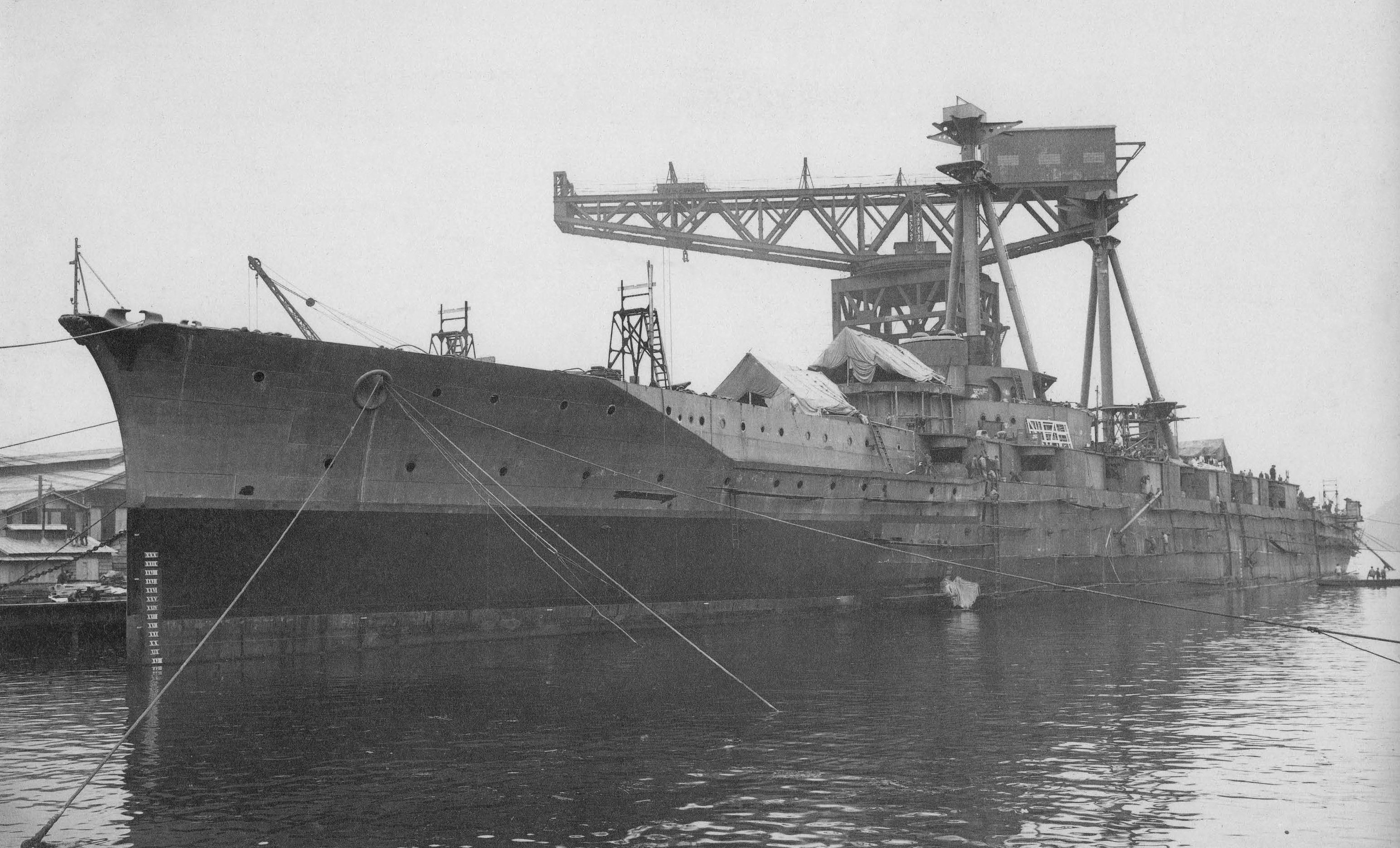
Hiei's fitting out in Yokosuka, September 1913

The keel of Hiei was laid down at Yokosuka Naval Arsenal on 4 November 1911, with most of the parts used in her construction manufactured in Britain. She was launched on 21 November 1912, and fitting-out began in December 1913. On 15 December 1913, Captain Shichitaro Takagi was assigned as her chief equipping officer. She was completed on 4 August 1914.

=== Armament ===
Hiei's main battery consisted of eight 14-inch (36 cm) heavy-caliber main guns in four twin turrets, two forward and two aft. The turrets were noted by the US Office of Naval Intelligence to be "similar to the British 15-inch turrets", with improvements made in flash-tightness in the gun chambers. Each of her main guns could fire high-explosive or armor-piercing shells 38,770 yards (19.14 nmi; 35.45 km) at a rate of two shells per minute. In keeping with the Japanese doctrine of deploying more powerful vessels than their opponents, Hiei and her sister ships were the first vessels in the world equipped with 14-inch (36 cm) guns. The main guns carried ammunition for ninety shots and had an approximate barrel-life of 250–280 shots.

Her secondary battery was originally sixteen 6-inch (15 cm) 50-caliber medium guns in single casemates (all located amidships), eight 3-inch (7.6 cm) guns and eight submerged 21-inch (53 cm) torpedo tubes. The sixteen 6-inch/50 caliber guns were capable of firing between 5 and 6 rounds per minute, with a barrel life of 500 rounds. The 6-inch/50 caliber gun was capable of firing both antiaircraft and antiship shells, though the positioning of the guns on Hiei made antiaircraft firing impractical. The eight 5-inch/40 caliber guns added later could fire between 8 and 14 rounds per minute, with a barrel life of 800–1,500 rounds. These guns had the widest variety of shot type of Hiei's guns, being designed to fire antiaircraft, antiship, and illumination shells. Hiei was also armed with a large number of 1-inch (2.5 cm) Type 96 antiaircraft autocannons.

== Service ==
=== 1914–1929: Battlecruiser ===
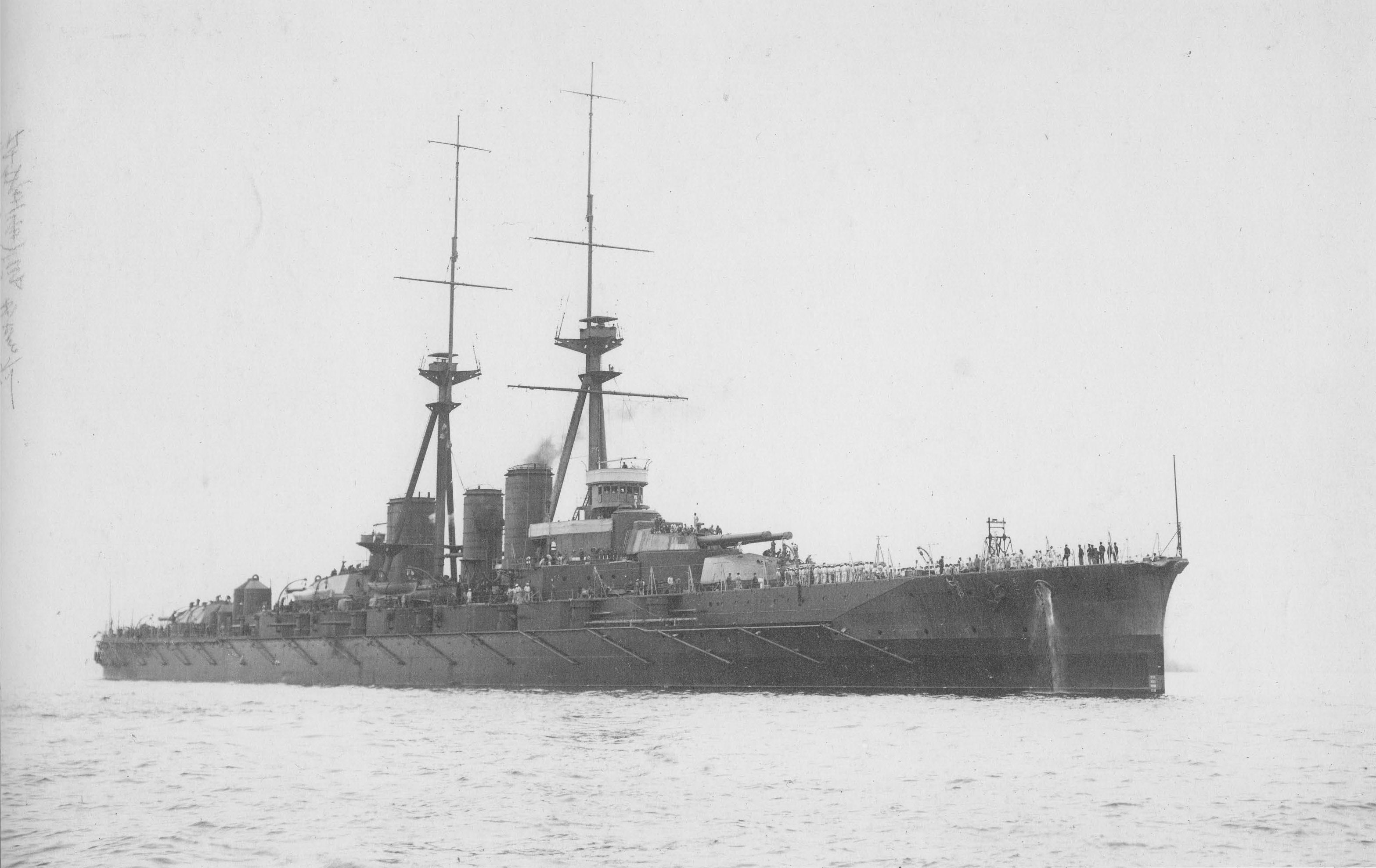
Hiei departing Yokosuka for Kure Naval Base, 23 March 1914

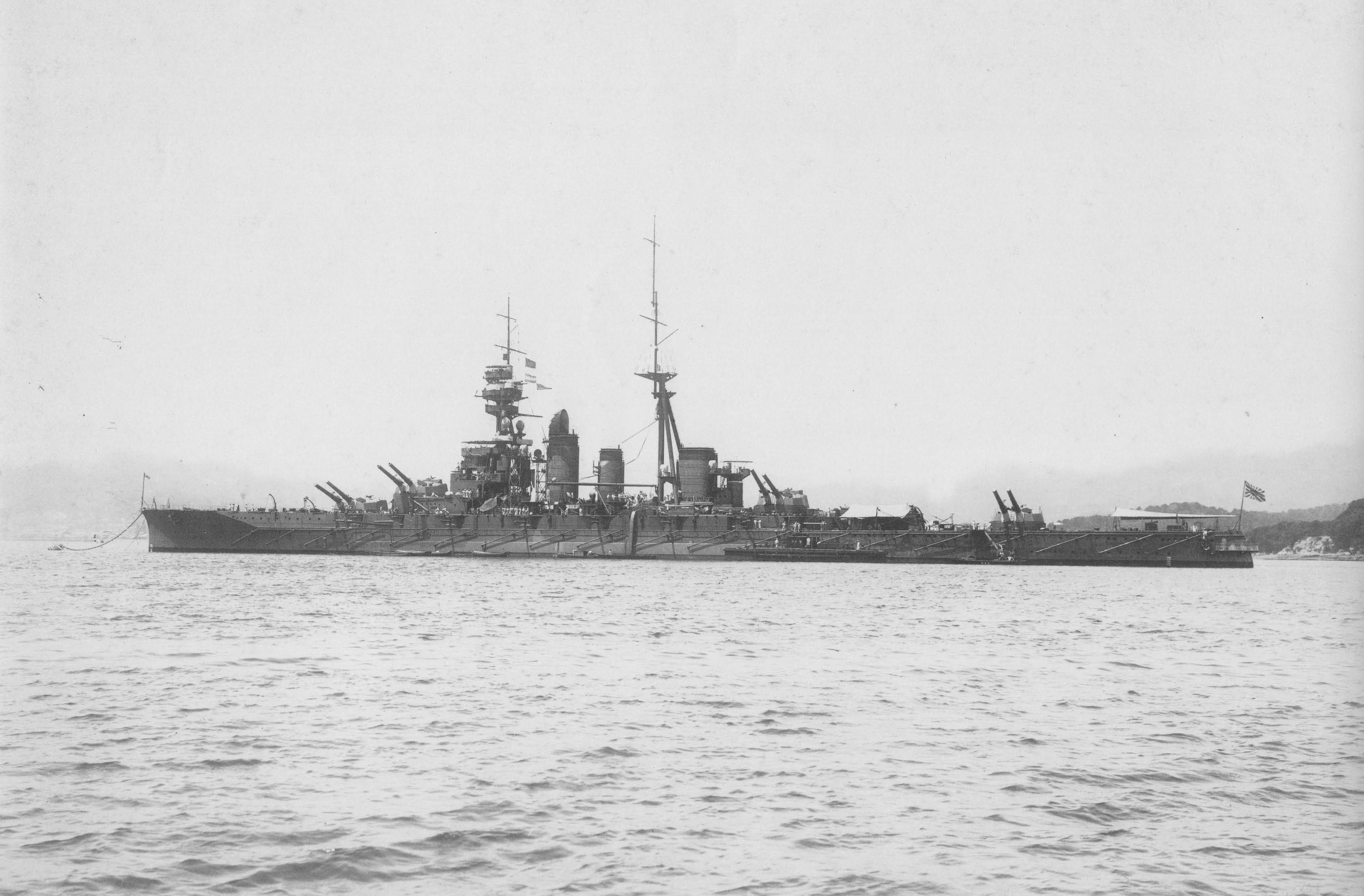
Hiei in Sasebo after first reconstruction, 1926

On 4 August 1914, Hiei was formally commissioned and assigned to the Sasebo Naval District, before being attached to the Third Battleship Division of the First Fleet two weeks later. On 23 August 1914, Japan declared war on the German Empire, occupying the former German colonies in Palau and in the Caroline, Marshall and Mariana Islands. In October 1914, Hiei departed Sasebo alongside Kongō to support Imperial Japanese Army units in the Siege of Tsingtao, but she was recalled on 17 October. On 3 October 1915, Hiei and Kongō participated in the sinking of the target ship Imperator Nikolai I, a Russian pre-dreadnought captured in 1905 during the Russo-Japanese War that had subsequently served in the Japanese Navy under the name Iki as a coastal defense ship. In April 1916, she patrolled the Chinese coast with her newly launched sisters Kirishima and Haruna. From 1917 to the end of World War I, Hiei remained primarily at Sasebo, patrolling the Chinese and Korean coasts with her sister ships on several occasions.

Following the end of World War I, the Japanese Empire gained control of former German possessions in the central Pacific per the terms of the Treaty of Versailles. Due to Japan's warm relations with the British Empire and the United States at the time, Hiei and other Japanese warships became significantly less active after the war. Other than a patrol alongside Haruna and Kirishima off the Chinese coast in March 1919, Hiei remained in the Japanese home ports. On 13 October 1920, she was placed in reserve. Following the Great Kantō earthquake of September 1923, the capital ships of the Japanese Navy assisted in rescue work until the end of the month. Hiei arrived at Kure Naval Base on 1 December 1923 for a refit which increased the elevation of her main guns from 20 to 33 degrees and rebuilt her foremast.

With the conclusion of World War I, the world powers attempted to stem any militarization that might re-escalate into war. Under the terms of Washington Naval Treaty of 1922, the Imperial Japanese Navy was significantly reduced, with a ratio of 5:5:3 required between the capital ships of the United Kingdom, the United States, and Japan. The treaty also banned Japan from building any new capital ships until 1931, with no capital ship permitted to exceed 35,000 tons. Provided that further additions did not exceed 3,000 tons, existing capital ships were allowed to be upgraded with improved torpedo bulges and deck armor. By the time the Washington Treaty had been fully implemented in Japan, only three classes of World War I-era capital ships—the Fusō class and Ise-class battleships, and the Kongō-class battlecruisers—remained active.

In July 1927, Crown Prince Takamatsu—Emperor Hirohito's younger brother—was assigned to Hiei. From October to November 1927, the ship underwent a minor refit at Sasebo to accommodate two Yokosuka E1Y floatplanes, though no launch catapults were added. On 29 March 1928, Hiei departed Sasebo alongside Kongō and the battleships Nagato and Fusō to patrol off the Chusan Archipelago, before arriving in the company of Kongō in Port Arthur in April 1928. In October 1929, she returned to Kure in preparation for her demilitarization and reconstruction.

=== 1929–1937: Demilitarization and training ship ===
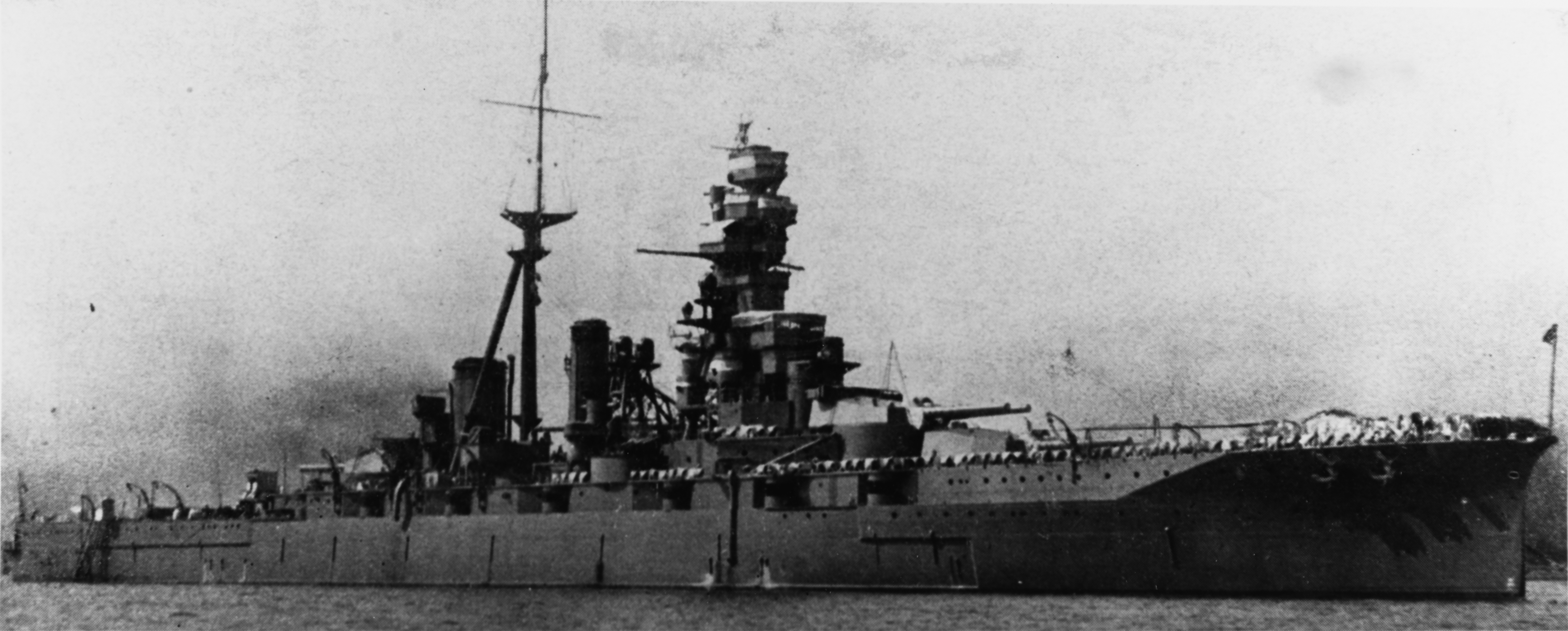
Hiei in August 1933, following her conversion to a training ship

To avoid having to scrap Hiei under the terms of the Washington Treaty, the Imperial Japanese Navy decided to convert her into a demilitarized training ship. On 15 October 1929, she went into drydock at Kure Naval Arsenal. Her No. 4 gun turret was removed, and she was stripped of all eight of her submerged torpedo tubes, as well as her 6-inch guns and armor belt. All but nine of her boilers were taken out, reducing her speed to 18 knots (33 km/h), and one of her three funnels was removed. She was reclassified as a reserve ship at the end of November 1929. On 24 April 1930, reconstruction was halted due to the signing of the London Naval Treaty, which further restricted battleship construction and possession amongst the great naval powers, and preservation work was begun at Sasebo. Reconstruction would not resume until July 1931.

In September 1931, Japanese army units invaded the Chinese province of Manchuria, transforming it into the puppet state of Manchukuo. In December 1932, Hiei was reassigned to the Imperial Japanese Navy's training squadron. On 25 February, the League of Nations ruled that Japan had violated Chinese sovereignty and international law in her invasion of Manchuria. Refusing to accept the League's judgment, the Empire of Japan withdrew from the League the same day. This also signaled its exit from the Washington and London Naval Treaties, which removed all restrictions on the Imperial Japanese Navy's construction of capital ships. From the end of May 1933 to 13 August, Hiei received upgrades that allowed her to perform regular duties for the Emperor, and she served as the Emperor's observation ship for the Imperial Naval Review three days later. From January to March 1934, her No. 4 turret and ammunition magazine were refitted. In November 1935, Hiei served as the Emperor's ship for his official visit to the Kagoshima and Miyazaki Prefectures.

=== 1937–1941: Reconstruction and fast battleship ===
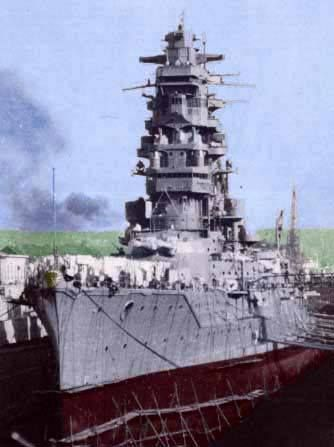
Hiei drydocked in November of 1941

No longer bound by the restrictions of the Washington and London Treaties, the Imperial Japanese Navy proceeded to reconstruct Hiei along the same lines as her sisters. She received eight new oil-fired Kampon boilers and geared turbines, while her stern was lengthened by 26 feet (7.9 m) to increase speed. Her aft 14-inch turret was refitted and fire control systems installed for all four main turrets. The elevation of her main and secondary guns was increased, and she was equipped with two Nakajima E8N "Dave" and Kawanishi E7K "Alf" reconnaissance floatplanes. To this end, catapults and launch-rails were also fitted aft of turret #3. Fourteen of her 6-inch guns were refitted, and an antiaircraft suite of eight 5-inch dual-purpose guns and ten twin mounts of Type 96 25 mm (0.98 in) autocannons were mounted. Her superstructure was rebuilt as a prototype of the tower-mast that would eventually be used on the Yamato class, then still in the design phase.

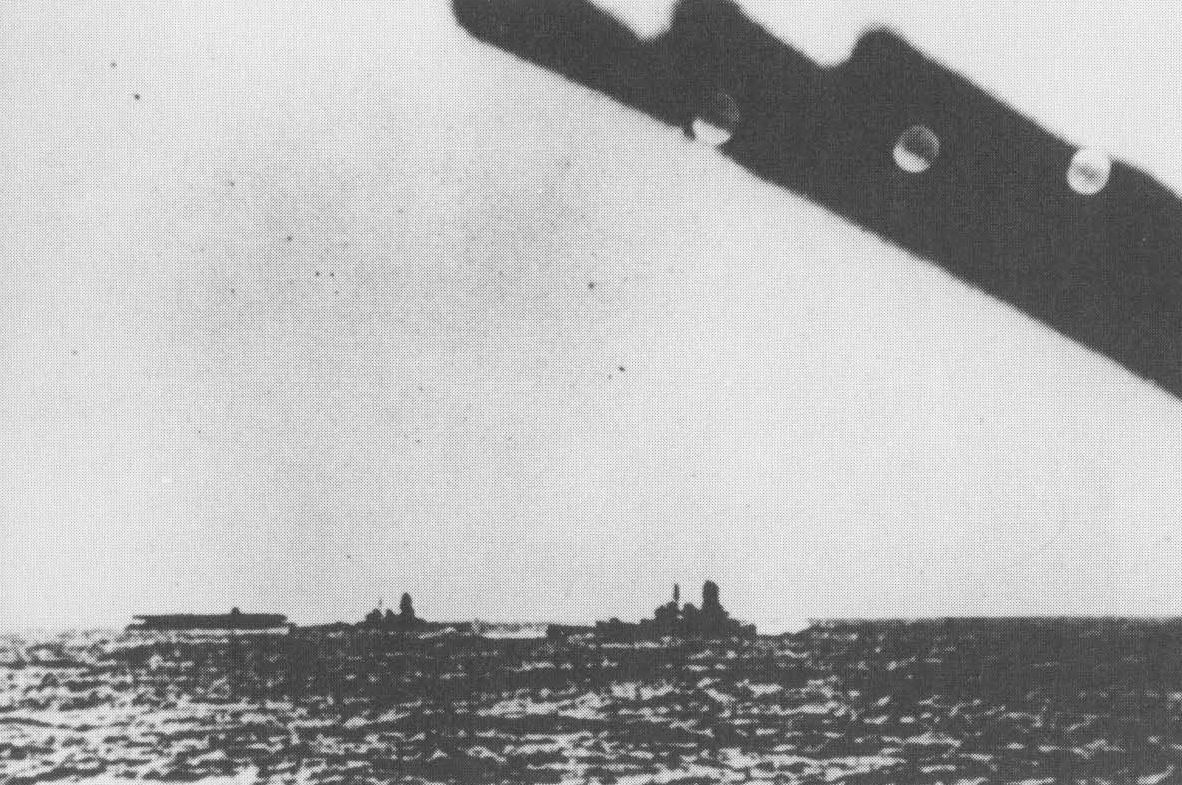
Akagi, Hiei, and Kirishima underway shortly before the attack on Pearl Harbor, 6 December 1941

Hiei's armor was also extensively upgraded. Her main belt was reapplied and strengthened to a uniform thickness of 8 inches (as opposed to varying thicknesses of 6–8 inches before the upgrades), while diagonal bulkheads of a depth ranging from 5 to 8 inches (127 to 203 mm) reinforced the main armored belt. The turret armor was strengthened to 10 inches (254 mm), while 4 inches (102 mm) were added to portions of the deck armor. The armor around her ammunition magazines was also strengthened over the course of the refit. Though still less heavily armored than other Japanese battleships, Hiei was significantly faster. The reconstruction was declared complete on 31 January 1940. Capable of speeds of up to 30.5 knots (56.5 km/h; 35.1 mph), Hiei was reclassified as a fast battleship. She participated in the Imperial Fleet Review in October 1940, where she was inspected by Emperor Hirohito, members of the royal family, Navy Minister Koshirō Oikawa, and Admiral Isoroku Yamamoto. In November, she was assigned to the Third Battleship Division of the First Fleet.

On 26 November 1941, Hiei departed Hitokappu Bay, Kurile Islands, in the company of Kirishima and six Japanese fast carriers of the First Air Fleet Striking Force (Akagi, Kaga, Sōryū, Hiryū, Shōkaku, and Zuikaku) under the command of Vice-Admiral Chuichi Nagumo. On 7 December 1941, aircraft from these six carriers attacked the United States Pacific Fleet at their home base of Pearl Harbor, sinking four US Navy battleships and numerous other vessels. Following the attack and the declaration of war by the United States, Hiei returned to Japan.

=== 1942: Combat and loss ===
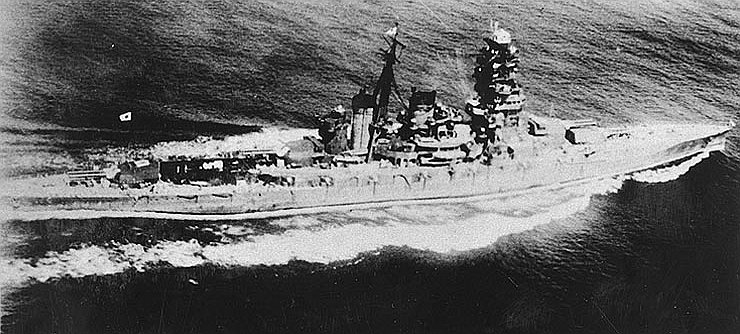
Hiei in Tokyo Bay, 11 July 1942

On 17 January 1942, Hiei departed Truk Lagoon Naval Base with the Third Battleship Division to support carrier operations against Rabaul and Kavieng. In February, she deployed alongside a force of carriers and destroyers in response to American raids on Japanese bases in the Gilbert and Marshall Islands. On 1 March, following carrier operations against Darwin and Java (in the Dutch East Indies), Hiei, Kirishima and Chikuma—which were acting as escorts for the carrier task force—engaged the destroyer USS Edsall, with Hiei firing 210 14-inch and seventy 6-inch shells. When the ships failed to score any hits, dive-bombers from three of Admiral Nagumo's carriers immobilized the destroyer, which was then finished off by gunfire from the three ships.

In April 1942, Hiei and the Third Battleship Division joined five fleet carriers and two cruisers in a massive raid against British naval forces in the Indian Ocean. On 5 April—Easter Sunday—the Japanese fleet attacked the harbor at Colombo, Ceylon while seaplanes from the cruiser Tone spotted two fleeing British heavy cruisers, both of which were later sunk by aerial attack. On 8 April, Japanese carrier aircraft attacked the Royal Navy base at Trincomalee, only to find that all of Admiral James Somerville's remaining warships in the British Eastern Fleet had withdrawn the previous night. Returning from the attack, a floatplane from Hiei's sister ship Haruna spotted the aircraft carrier HMS Hermes, which was quickly sunk by massive aerial attack. The fleet then returned to Japan, arriving at the home bases on 23 April.

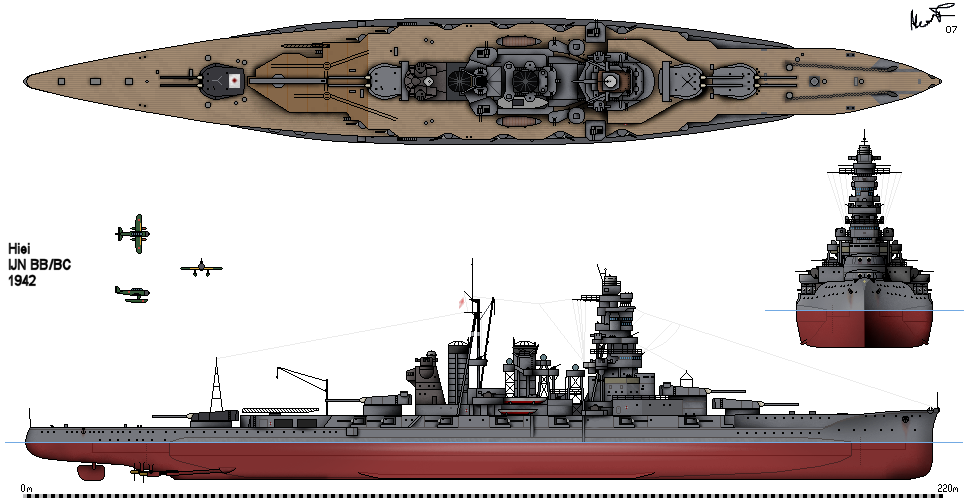
A drawing of Hiei, November 1942

On 27 May 1942, Hiei sortied with Kongō and the heavy cruisers Atago, Chōkai, Myōkō, and Haguro as part of Admiral Nobutake Kondō's Invasion Force during the Battle of Midway. Following the disastrous loss of four of the Combined Fleet's fast carriers on 4 June, Kondō's force withdrew to Japan. In July, Hiei was drydocked at Yokosuka for refits to her aircraft complement and the addition of single and twin 25 mm gun mounts. In August, she escorted the Japanese carrier Shōkaku during the Battle of the Eastern Solomons. In October, Hiei sortied as part of Rear Admiral Abe's Vanguard Force, and maintained distant cover as Kongō and Haruna nearly destroyed Henderson Field on Guadalcanal on the night of 13 October. From 26 to 30 October, Hiei and her sisters participated in the Battle of the Santa Cruz Islands.

=== Naval Battle of Guadalcanal ===
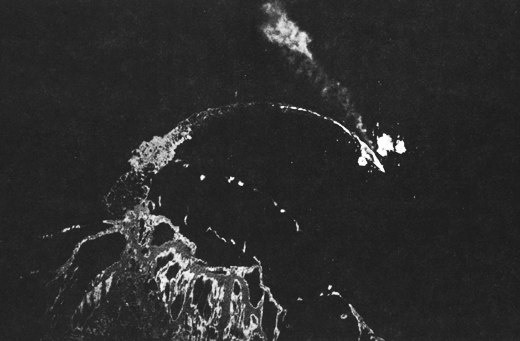
A damaged Hiei, trailing oil, is attacked by US Army B-17s, 13 November 1942

On 10 November 1942, Hiei departed Truk alongside Kirishima, the light cruiser Nagara, and eleven destroyers, all under the command of Vice Admiral Hiroaki Abe, to shell American positions near Henderson Field in advance of a major convoy of Japanese troops. The force was spotted by US Navy reconnaissance aircraft several days in advance. The US deployed a force of two heavy cruisers, three light cruisers and eight destroyers under the command of Rear Admiral Daniel J. Callaghan to meet the Japanese force in Ironbottom Sound. At 01:24 on 13 November, the Japanese force was detected 28,000 yards (26 km) out by the light cruiser USS Helena. Because Abe had not anticipated resistance, his battleships' main guns were loaded with anti-aircraft shells for bombarding Henderson Field. The initial salvos from the IJN battleships were thus not capable of dealing severe damage to the enemy's vital armor protected hull, engines and gun turrets.

At 01:50, Hiei activated her searchlights and illuminated the light cruiser USS Atlanta, which along with several other American ships sank the destroyer Akatsuki. However, Hiei and Nagara fired multiple main battery and secondary salvos, which likely hit Atlanta with 13 6-inch shells, followed closely by a torpedo hit from the destroyer Ikazuchi. Aflame and taking water steadily, Atlanta began to drift out of action. Crippled and disabled – and later mistakenly hit by an additional 19 8-inch (203 mm) shells from US cruisers which killed Admiral Scott – Atlanta was left adrift and sank two hours later with the loss of 170 men.

The lead cluster of American destroyers – USS Cushing, Laffey, O'Bannon, and Sterett – closed to point blank range; Cushing fired a spread of torpedoes at Hiei which missed, only to be ambushed and sunk by the Nagara and the destroyers Harusame, Yukikaze, and Teruzuki. O'Bannon, however, was the first destroyer to successfully attack the Japanese flagship, smashing Hiei with multiple 5-inch (127 mm) shell hits that set her on fire and a pair of dud torpedo hits, before a rain squall blinded the destroyers and temporarily saved Hiei from further damage.

However, a set of lights emerged from the fog, much to the crew's surprise. This was the Laffey, which had accidentally set herself on a collision course with Hiei and was speeding right towards her. Under an emergency speed boost and excellent maneuvering, Laffey just barely avoided crashing into Hiei, coming as close as 20 feet (6 meters) from the battleship, and was so close the ship's guns could not press low enough to hit her, and in turn the destroyer raked Hiei with shellfire, scoring hits to her superstructure which injured Admiral Abe and killed Abe's staff officer, Masakane Suzuki, before dashing off. O'Bannon and Sterett then re-engaged Hiei and further peppered her in 5-inch (127 mm) gunfire and another pair of dud torpedoes; Hiei taking no critical damage but suffering multiple fires setting off in the ship's unarmored portions.

Unable to press their main guns low enough to hit the attacking destroyers, Hiei and Kirishima instead focused their fire on the American cruisers, first dueling the American flagship, the heavy cruiser USS San Francisco. Together, they crippled San Francisco with twelve 14-inch (356 mm) shell hits, alongside some 35 shell hits from their secondary batteries and escorting destroyers, killing Admiral Callaghan. However, San Francisco managed to gouge Hiei with seventeen armor piercing 8-inch (203 mm) shells, two of which hit Hiei's steering gear room, flooding it with water, shorting out her power steering generators, and disabled her rudder, leaving her an unmaneuverable wreck. Without these hits, Hiei would have survived the battle. Instead, Hiei engaged in a gunnery duel with the heavy cruiser USS Portland, hitting her with a pair of 14-inch (356 mm) shells that impacted on her main belt; the majority of the damage inflicted to Portland came in the form of a torpedo hit from the Japanese destroyer Inazuma. Hiei was in turn damaged by thirteen more 8-inch (203 mm) shells from Portland.

As the distance between Hiei and the American destroyers increased, her crew realized the destroyers were in range of the main guns and opened fire. Hiei took revenge on the pesky Laffey and hit her with a pair of 14-inch (356 mm) shells, one exploding in her bridge, and the other in her amidships superstructure. However, the use of type 3 AA shells meant neither shell caused significant damage, and Laffey was sunk primarily via a torpedo hit from the destroyer Yukikaze. Hiei instead earned more success when she noticed the Japanese destroyers Asagumo, Murasame, and Samidare blasting the destroyer USS Monssen, which they immediately scored hits which destroyed her forward turrets and set her on fire. Hiei flanked Monssen and hit her with three 14-inch (356 mm) shells, sinking the destroyer alongside gunfire from her own escorting destroyers.

In total, Hiei had been struck by at least 85 American shells, including 30 8-inch (203 mm) shells from San Francisco and Portland and up to nine torpedo hits, most of which probably failed to detonate. Most critically were the shells San Francisco landed to her steering gear, crippling the ship. With one of his battleships crippled, Abe ordered the remainder of the Japanese fleet to withdraw at 02:00. Kirishima attempted to tow Hiei to safety, but water flooded Hiei's steering compartments, jamming her rudder to starboard and forcing her to steer in circles. Throughout the morning of 13 November, Hiei was subjected to attack from American Army B-17 Flying Fortress bombers. She continued circling to starboard at 5 knots (5.8 mph). At 11:30, three torpedoes launched from Grumman TBF Avenger torpedo-bombers struck Hiei, and after landing and rearming at Henderson Field, the torpedo planes from the USS Enterprise hit the battleship with three more torpedoes. The combined attacks by both the B-17s and strike aircraft from Henderson Field inflicted a total of 5–8 torpedo hits and 7–8 500 lb and 1000 lb bomb hits and a number of torpedoes on the stricken battleship in addition to the damage from the night surface battle. Her crew was ordered to abandon ship, and her escorting destroyers scuttled her with torpedoes. Hiei sank sometime in the evening on 13 November with the loss of 188 of her crew; the first battleship lost by Japan during World War II. She was removed from the Navy List on 20 December 1942.

=== Wreck ===
On 6 February 2019, Paul Allen's exploration ship RV Petrel announced the discovery of Hiei. According to Petrel, the main body of Hiei now lies upside down in 3,000 feet (900 m) of water northwest of Savo Island in the Solomon Islands. As with her sister ship, Kirishima, the bow of the ship is gone forward of the bridge due to a magazine explosion.
