= Indian Ocean raid (1944) =

World War II Japanese raid on Allied ships

Second Indian Ocean raid
- Part of the Pacific War
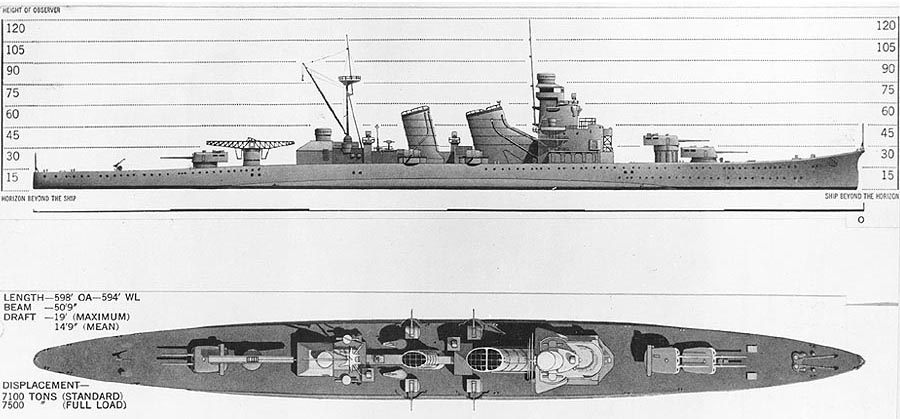
- US Navy recognition drawing for Aoba-class cruisers
Date	1–16 March 1944
Location	Indian Ocean
Result	Inconclusive

Belligerents
Japan	United Kingdom

Commanders and leaders
Naomasa Sakonju	James Somerville

Strength
3 heavy cruisers	1 steamer

Casualties and losses
None	1 steamer sunk; 3 killed
- Either 72 or 89 British survivors were murdered by Japanese forces after being taken prisoner.

In March 1944, in Operation SA No.1, a force of three Imperial Japanese Navy (IJN) heavy cruisers raided Allied shipping in the Indian Ocean. The cruisers departed Japanese-held territory on 1 March with the support of other IJN vessels and aircraft. On 9 March, they encountered and sank the British steamer Behar, with the heavy cruiser Tone picking up over 100 survivors. Fearing detection, the Japanese force subsequently returned to the Netherlands East Indies (NEI), arriving on 16 March.

Two days later, either 72 or 89 British crew and passengers of Behar were murdered on board Tone. Following the war the commander of the raid, Rear Admiral Naomasa Sakonju, was executed for this war crime and Tone's captain Haruo Mayuzumi was sentenced to seven years imprisonment.

== Background ==
=== Combined Fleet ===
In February 1944, the Japanese Combined Fleet withdrew from its base at Truk in the Central Pacific to Palau and Singapore. The appearance of a powerful Japanese naval force at Singapore concerned the Allies, as it was feared that these ships could potentially conduct raids in the Indian Ocean and against Western Australia.

=== Eastern Fleet ===
The Allies reinforced their naval and air forces in the area by transferring two British light cruisers from the Atlantic and Mediterranean as well as several US Navy warships from the Pacific. The number of air units in Ceylon and the Bay of Bengal region was also increased. Admiral James Somerville, the commander of the British Eastern Fleet, feared that the Japanese would repeat the Indian Ocean raid of early 1942, and on 25 February requested permission to withdraw his fleet from its base at Trincomalee so that it was not at risk from the larger Japanese force. The Admiralty rejected this request, directed that the fleet should remain at Trincomalee unless it was threatened by a superior Japanese force. A withdrawal would affect morale and harm Britain's prestige in the region. It was agreed that the Eastern Fleet should not engage superior Japanese forces and could withdraw if Somerville judged this necessary.

=== Japanese plan ===
In late February, the Commander in Chief, Southwest Area Fleet (Vice-Admiral Shiro Takasu) ordered the heavy cruisers Aoba, Chikuma, and Tone to raid Allied shipping on the main route between Aden and Fremantle. This force was commanded by Rear Admiral Naomasa Sakonju on board Aoba. In his instructions to Sakonju, Vice Admiral Takasu directed that if the force captured Allied merchant seamen, prisoners, except for radio operators and other personnel who might possess useful information, were to be killed. Sakonju did not question this order. The Japanese cruisers embarked specialised boarding parties as it was hoped that they could capture merchant ships to alleviate Japan's shipping shortage.

== Raid ==
The three Japanese heavy cruisers departed from the Combined Fleet anchorage in the Lingga Islands on 27 February. The light cruisers Kinu and Ōi and three destroyers escorted the force through the Sunda Strait on 1 March. The raiders were supported by ten medium bombers and three or four seaplanes based in Sumatra and west Java that conducted patrols in the direction of Ceylon. Three or four submarines from the 8th Flotilla also monitored Allied shipping movements near Ceylon, the Maldive Islands and Chagos Archipelago. The Allies did not detect the departure of the Japanese flotilla but reinforced their forces in Western Australia (Western Australian emergency of March 1944) after an American submarine encountered Kinu and Ōi operating near the Lombok Strait on 6 March. The presence of these ships was taken to indicate that a hostile force had possibly been dispatched into the Indian Ocean. On 8 March, Somerville directed all Allied ships travelling between 80° and 100° east to divert to the south or west.

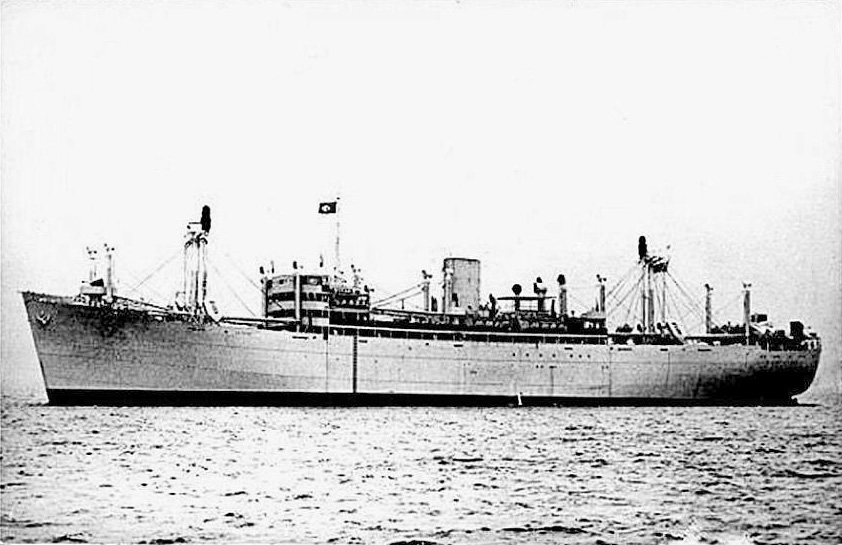
SS Behar in 1943

After leaving the Sunda Strait, the Japanese heavy cruisers sailed south-west for the main route between Aden and Fremantle. The ships were spread 50 km (27 nmi; 31 mi) by day and 20 km (11 nmi; 12 mi) by night and maintained radio silence. On the morning of 9 March, they encountered the 6,100-long-ton (6,200 t) British steamer Behar at 20°32′S 87°10′E, about midway between Fremantle and Colombo. The ship was travelling from Fremantle to Bombay as part of a voyage between Newcastle, New South Wales and the United Kingdom carrying a cargo of zinc.

Upon sighting the Japanese ships, Behar's master, Captain Maurice Symons, ordered that his radio operator transmit "RRR" to notify other ships and Allied bases that the merchant ship was being attacked by surface raiders. Tone's signals room picked up this message. Tone first signaled repeatedly to the Behar to surrender, but as the Behar continued to flee, the cruiser opened fire. The Japanese cruiser did not attempt to capture the steamer, as it was judged too risky to sail her back to Japanese territory. Tone's gunners scored hits on Behar's prow and stern which killed three of her crew. Five minutes after the sighting, Behar's crew and passengers abandoned ship. The steamer sank shortly afterwards and either 104 or 108 survivors were rescued by Tone. (Note: The number of Behar survivors rescued after the ship's sinking differ between sources. Lamont-Brown (2002) states that 108 of the 111 people on board the ship were rescued while Gill (1968) states that there were 104 survivors, all of whom were rescued.)

The Behar survivors were maltreated by members of Tone's crew. Japanese sailors forced the survivors to hand over all their personal belongings of any value, and then used ropes to tie the survivors in painful positions which caused them to have difficulty breathing. The merchant ship's chief officer was beaten after he complained that treating civilians in such a way violated the Geneva Convention. The female survivors later had their ropes removed. When the survivors were taken below decks to be imprisoned they were badly beaten by Japanese sailors.

Following the attack, Sakonju judged that it was too dangerous to continue the raid as Behar's distress message may have alerted the Allies to his force's presence and the Japanese turned back for the NEI that day. The heavy cruisers were again escorted through the Sunda Strait by Kinu, Ōi and five destroyers, and arrived back at the NEI on 15 March. During this time, the Behar survivors were held in a small and extremely hot store room on board Tone, and were given little access to food and water, sanitary facilities and exercise.

Despite Sakonju's fears, the Allies were not immediately aware of the attack on Behar. Her distress signal had been picked up by only an Allied merchant ship, which did not report it until she arrived at Fremantle on 17 March. In the meantime, Somerville had decided on 16 March that surface raiders no longer posed a threat to shipping in the Indian Ocean and allowed Allied vessels to resume their normal routing.

== Massacre ==
Shortly after the Behar survivors were rescued, Sakonju sent a radio message to Captain Haruo Mayuzumi, the commanding officer of Tone reprimanding him for taking non-essential personnel prisoner and not capturing the merchant ship. In this message Sakonju ordered that the survivors be killed. Mayuzumi was unwilling to do so as this would violate his Christian religious beliefs. His executive officer, Commander Junsuke Mii, also opposed killing the prisoners. Mayuzumi radioed a request to Sakonju that the prisoners be put ashore but this was rejected. The captain then visited Aoba to argue his case, but Sakonju remained unmoved and told Mayuzumi to "obey my orders". Despite his misgivings, Mayuzumi decided to kill the prisoners.

On 15 March the three heavy cruisers anchored at Tanjung Priok near Java. Following this, either 15 or 36 survivors were transferred to Aoba. (Note: Gill (1968) states that 15 Behar survivors were landed at Tanjung Priok while Lamont-Brown (2002) puts the figure at 36.) The party sent to Aoba included Symonds, the Behar's chief officer and several of the senior officers as well as both female passengers. All of this group were later landed at Tanjung Priok. The three cruisers sailed from Tanjung Priok bound for Singapore on 18 March. That night, all the prisoners on board Tone were beheaded by several officers. Mayuzumi watched the killings from the ship's bridge but Mii refused to take part. The number of the crew to be murdered was between 65 and more than 100.

== Aftermath ==
Aoba, Chikuma and Tone arrived at Singapore on 25 March. The Indian Ocean raid was the last operation conducted by Axis surface raiders during World War II. Behar was the final Allied merchant ship to be sunk by surface raiders during the war. The raid is notable chiefly for the Behar massacre; it achieved little militarily. The raid failed to disrupt Allied traffic in the region as the diversions ordered by Somerville on 8 March were rescinded by 16 March. The only tangible result was the sinking of Behar; by contrast Axis submarines sank three ships in the Indian Ocean during the same period. The raid was also less successful than comparable raids by surface ships in the region, such as that of Admiral Scheer in 1941. The Japanese made no attempt to exploit their numerical superiority in the region and by the end of the month it had vanished; reinforcements to the Eastern Fleet enabled Somerville to start carrier raids, commencing with an Operation Cockpit an attack on Sabang on 19 April 1944.

The party of Behar survivors who had been landed at Tanjung Priok were initially interned in prisoner of war camps in Java; the male prisoners were sent to a camp near Batavia and the women were held in a female camp nearby. After all the members of the group had been interrogated, the survivors were separated and sent to other camps in Java or to work as slave labourers in Japan. All the survivors were freed after the end of the war in August 1945. One of the survivors, Mrs Agnes (Nancy) Shaw, had been travelling to India to join her husband. They had been separated when they escaped from Malaya on different ships. She was imprisoned at Camp Makkasar in Batavia (now Java) where she worked in the camp bakery. She was reunited with her husband after Java was liberated. When the British government negotiated gratuities for Far East prisoners of war the Foreign and Commonwealth Office disavowed knowledge of her captivity. On being shown artefacts from captivity including a pastel sketchbook the gratuity was paid. She died in Aberdeen in February 2002 aged 89.

Following the war, the Allies prosecuted the officers responsible for the murders on board Tone. Vice Admiral Takasu had died from disease in September 1944, but Sakonju was tried by the British in 1947 at Hong Kong, and sentenced to death and executed 21 January 1948. Mayuzumi was also convicted for his role in the killings and sentenced to seven years imprisonment.

== See also ==
- Japanese raiders in the Indian Ocean
