= Japanese destroyers of World War II =

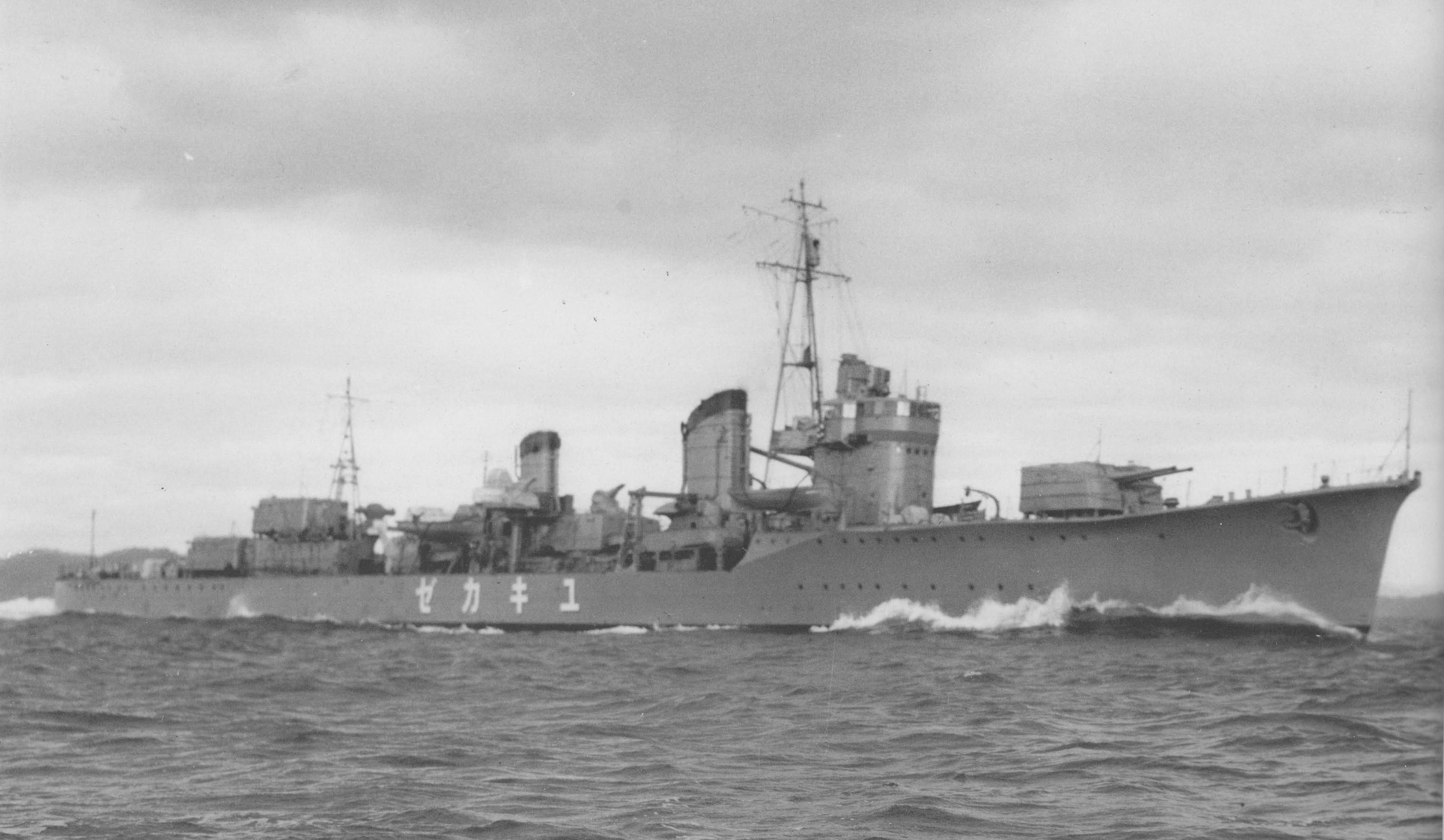
The Yukikaze, a particularly notable Japanese destroyer of World War II.

Japanese destroyers of World War II included some of the most formidable destroyers (駆逐艦, kuchikukan) of their day. This came as a surprise to the Allies, who had generally underestimated Japanese technical capabilities. The Japanese had reassessed their naval needs in the mid-1920s and, placing an emphasis on ship and weapons technology and night-fighting expertise, developed a completely new destroyer design. Subsequent development from one destroyer class to the next was not, however, a smooth progression. Aside from the usual changes arising from experience, serious design faults also came to light and naval treaties imposed restrictions. As a result, the early "Special Type" destroyers required significant changes and the specifications of subsequent classes was reduced in one way or another. Naval treaties were later abrogated in 1937 and so destroyer development continued without regard to limits.

Generally speaking, the Imperial Japanese Navy (IJN) requirements gave rise to warships that were substantially larger than most of their European or American equivalents. In the early war years, their advantages were aggressively exploited against the often second rate and poorly coordinated Allied ships stationed in the region, such as at the Battle of the Java Sea. The Japanese did not, however, continue to install new technology, such as radar, to match their opponents, and destroyer numbers were eroded steadily. The Japanese emphasis on fleet destroyers had neglected the need for large numbers of escort vessels to defend critical merchantmen, a need learnt by both the Royal Navy and the United States Navy in the Battle of the Atlantic. In recognition that quantity was as important as quality in some roles, design policy was therefore modified to produce units that were easier to build and operate. Despite this, Japan's destroyer force was halved by the end of the war. The surviving ships were surrendered to the Allies.

== Evolution ==
The oldest Japanese destroyers at the declaration of war with the United States dated from World War I designs and were rated as "class 1" (greater than 1,000 tons (standard)) or "class 2" (under 1,000 tons (standard)). As these became outclassed and unsuitable for front line duties, they were relegated to coastal protection and convoy escort duties, including support of the landings in the Dutch East Indies (now Indonesia), Philippines and Wake Island.

The Washington Naval Treaty of 1922 assigned Japan a tonnage allocation with which it was dissatisfied. IJN planners assessed their needs to protect Japan's maritime lifelines with the assumption that their most likely opponent would be the United States. A total of 144 destroyers was deemed to be necessary. In order to achieve a long-ranged fleet, capable of operating far from home waters and bases, treaty limitations were disregarded. Japanese naval strategy assumed a major deciding battle against the United States and the destroyers' role would have been to harass and reduce the enemy in the lead up to such a battle. The resultant design was the Fubuki-class destroyer, which were commissioned during 1928–1932. The Fubukis became the basis for subsequent destroyer development, but they needed significant modification when stability and hull strength problems became apparent. These modifications were worked into new ship designs.

The Japanese produced some unusual and advanced features. The third group of Fubukis introduced a unique splinterproof torpedo tube turret (later retrofitted), allowing the tubes to be reloaded in action. In addition, they introduced splinterproof, gas-tight turrets for the 5-inch guns, far ahead of their time. To increase comfort, the forecastle was raised and the bridge enlarged and enclosed, to offer protection against weather in the Pacific. Furthermore, in line with Japan's evident preference for two stacks, Fubukis had an unusual siamesed design (that is, having two separate sets of boiler, engine and powertrain system for redundancy).

The London Naval Treaty added more restrictions to ship design and displacements were temporarily reduced (Hatsuharu and Shiratsuyu classes) until Japan withdrew from the naval treaties. The subsequent Asashios, Kagerōs, and Yūgumos resumed the design evolution and delivered the ships that the IJN desired, with substantially increased displacements. Further technical developments were prototyped in Shimakaze, but the design was not continued. Although the anti-aircraft (AA) defences of Japanese destroyers were shown to be inadequate, the IJN had recognised the need for fleet AA defence and the Akizukis were intended to fill this need.

The IJN suffered one problem with their destroyers: small batches of different types, which made standardized spares and training (such as on powerplant) impossible. By contrast, the United States Navy's destroyer powerplant was standard across hundreds of ships.

A substantial number of Japanese destroyers were lost in 1942 in actions around the Solomon Islands. The urgent need for replacements necessitated design simplifications to improve construction speed and war experience prompted improvements to damage control and anti aircraft weaponry. The resultant Matsu-class destroyers were commissioned in 1944.

== Naming history ==
Due to the anticipated expansion of the navy, the IJN issued numerical designations to every destroyer for the short period 1923–1928. However, the bland numerical designations were unpopular with the officers and crews. The IJN abolished destroyers' numerical designations in August 1928, reverting to names. The reverence held by the Japanese for the arts of war, promoted by the pre-war military governments, led to poetic sounding names for warships. Destroyers were allocated names associated with natural phenomena of weather, sky and sea, e.g., wind (kaze), snow (yuki), rain (ame), clouds (kumo), waves (nami), mist (kiri), frost (shimo), tides (shio), and the moon (tsuki).

== Statistics ==
Excluding those ships that preceded the first "Special Type", or Fubuki, destroyers, Japan had sixty-eight front-line destroyers in commission at the declaration of war with the Allies (in contrast to the 144 planners had proposed). A further sixty-four were commissioned during the war, but these failed to compensate for the losses incurred and the number of ships available declined steadily until mid-1944. There was a further catastrophic decline in October–November 1944, when over twenty were lost. Only thirty-one survived hostilities. The high level of destroyer losses has been attributed to the poor effectiveness of their anti-aircraft and anti-submarine weaponry and radar, the aggressiveness with which they were used, and their being squandered on supply missions to Guadalcanal.

== Survivors ==
Despite the severe losses during the war, some Japanese destroyers survived. They were either scrapped or allocated as war reparation to one of the Allies (China, Netherlands, UK, USA or USSR).

Ship	Japanese	Class	Fate
Kuri	栗, "chestnut"	Momi	Surrendered September 1945. Mined 8 October 1945.
Fuji (renamed Patrol Boat No. 36 in 1939)	藤, "wisteria"	Momi	Surrendered August 1945. Ceded to the Netherlands in 1946 and scrapped 1947.
Ashi (became training ship Tomariura No.2)	葦, "reed"	Momi	Surrendered August 1945. Scrapped 1947.
Hasu	蓮, "lotus"	Momi	Surrendered September 1945. Scrapped 1946.
Sumire (became training ship Mitaka)	菫, "violet"	Momi	Surrendered August 1945. Scrapped March 1948.
Namikaze	波風, "wave wind"	Minekaze	Ceded to China 1947 and renamed Shen Yang.
Sawakaze	沢風, "swamp/marsh wind"	Minekaze	Scrapped 1948.
Yakaze	矢風, "arrow wind"	Minekaze	Scrapped.
Yūkaze	夕風, "evening wind"	Minekaze	Ceded to UK 1947.
Harukaze	春風, "spring wind"	Kamikaze	Scrapped 1947.
Kamikaze	神風, "divine wind"	Kamikaze	Scrapped October 1947.
Asagao	朝顔, "morning glory"	Wakatake	Scrapped June 1948.
Ushio	潮, "tide"	Fubuki	Scrapped August 1948.
Hibiki	響, "echo"	Akatsuki	Ceded to USSR in 1947 and renamed Verniy. Scrapped 1963.
Yukikaze	雪風, "snow wind"	Kagerō	Surrendered August 1945, ceded to China in 1947 and renamed Tan-Yang. Scrapped after grounding in 1970.
Suzutsuki	涼月, "clear autumn moon"	Akizuki	Scrapped 1948.
Fuyutsuki	冬月, "winter moon"	Akizuki	Scrapped 1948.
Hanazuki	花月, "flower moon"	Akizuki	Ceded to USA August 1947. Sunk as target off Gotō Islands, Japan February 1948.
Yoizuki	宵月, "early evening moon"	Akizuki	Ceded to China August 1947 and renamed Fen Yang. Scrapped 1963.
Harutsuki	春月, "spring moon"	Akizuki	Surrendered August 1945, ceded to USSR August 1947 and renamed Pospeschny.
Natsuzuki	夏月, "summer moon"	Akizuki	Ceded to UK September 1947. Scrapped 1948.
Take	竹, "bamboo"	Matsu	Ceded to UK July 1947. Scrapped 1948.
Maki	槇, "Chinese black pine"	Matsu	Ceded to UK August 1947. Scrapped 1947.
Kiri	桐, "paulownia"	Matsu	Ceded to USSR July 1947.
Sugi	杉, "cedar"	Matsu	Ceded to China July 1947, renamed Huiyang. Scrapped 1951.
Kashi	樫, "live oak"	Matsu	Ceded to US August 1947. Scrapped 1948.
Kaya	萱, "Japanese nutmeg"	Matsu	Ceded to USSR July 1947.
Kaede	楓, "maple"	Matsu	Ceded to China July 1947, renamed Hengyang. Scrapped 1962.
Nara	楢, "oak"	Matsu	Scrapped 1948.
Tsubaki	椿, "camellia"	Matsu	Scrapped 1948.
Keyaki	欅, "keyaki tree" (zelkova serrata)	Matsu	Ceded to US July 1947. Sunk off Bōsō peninsula as target 1947.
Yanagi	柳, "willow"	Matsu	Scrapped 1948.

== Tasks ==
Japanese destroyers performed the usual range of tasks: fleet and convoy escorts, supply and reinforcement runs to various isolated island outposts and garrisons. Japanese destroyers were particularly skilled at night actions and the use of torpedo salvoes, tactics which attracted success in several actions. This advantage, however, was reduced by the Allies' use of superior radar and resources.

== Destroyer classes ==
=== Momo ===
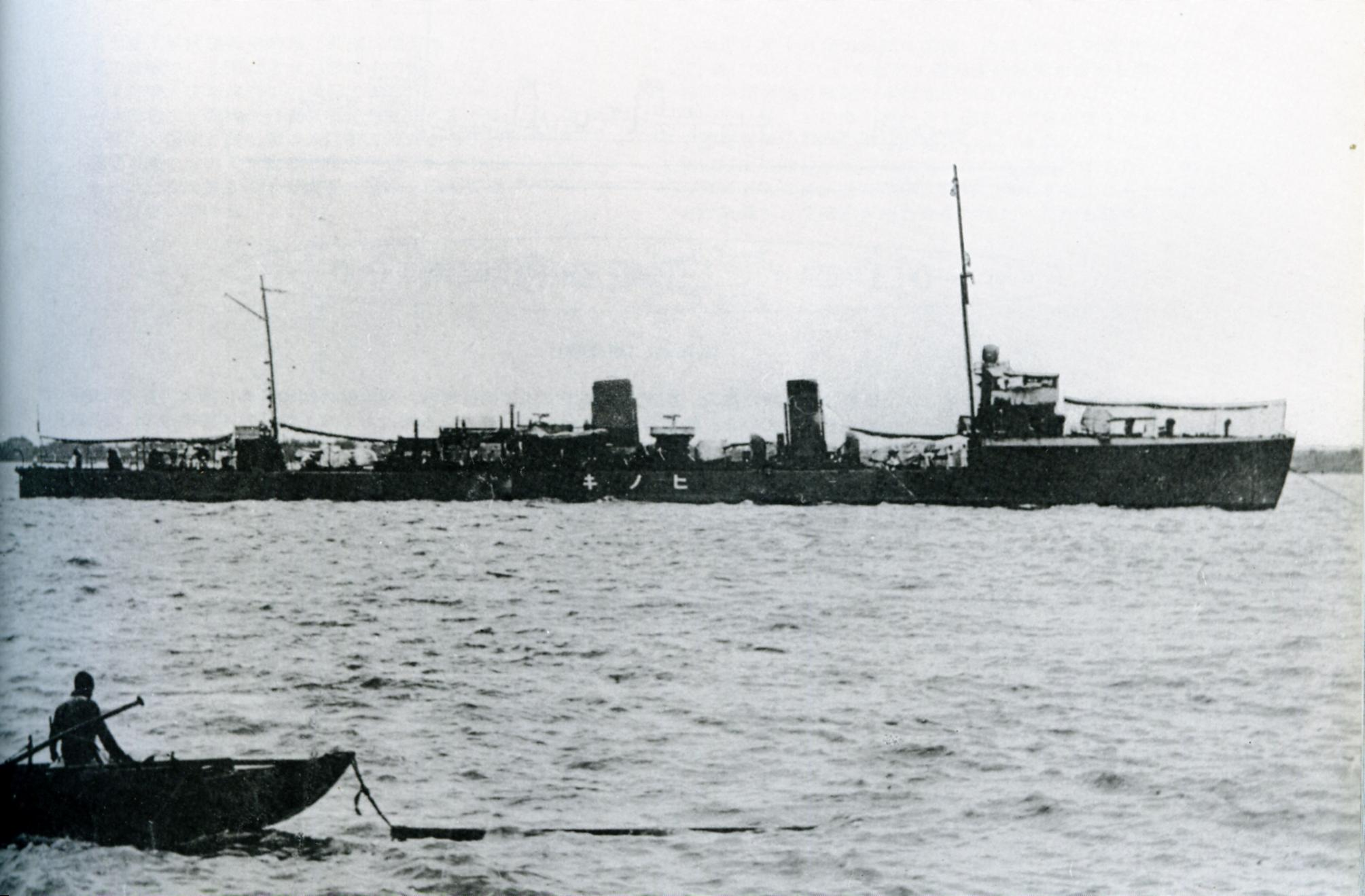
Momo class (桃型駆逐艦)

Four Momo-class (桃, "Peach Tree") ships were built by Japan and commissioned during 1916–17. They displaced 835 tons standard and carried three 4.7-inch (120 mm) guns and six 21-inch (53 cm) torpedo tubes.

By the outbreak of war with the United States in 1941, all had either been scrapped, reduced to non-combatant roles or were used for secondary escort work. One survived the war and was scrapped soon after.

=== Momi ===
Twenty-one vessels of the Momi class (樅, "Fir Tree") were built by Japan and commissioned in the early 1920s as second-class destroyers. They displaced 770 tons standard and carried three 4.7-inch (120 mm) guns and four 21-inch (53 cm) torpedo tubes.

By the outbreak of war with the United States in 1941, all had either been scrapped, reduced to non-combatant roles or were used for secondary escort work. Five survived the war and were scrapped soon after.

=== Minekaze ===
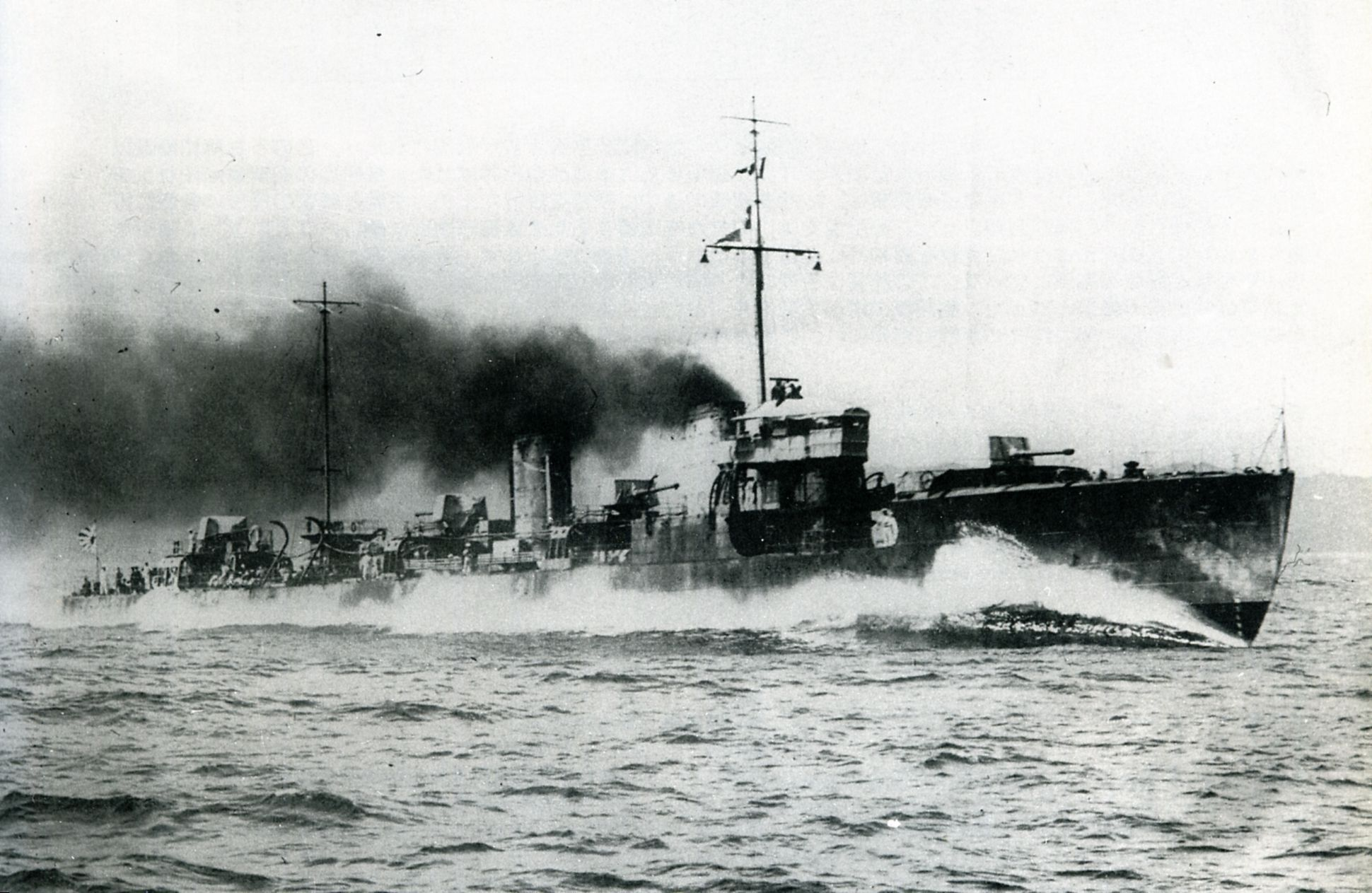
Minekaze class (峯風型駆逐艦)

Fifteen Minekaze-class (峯風, "Summit Wind") ships were commissioned between March 1920 and July 1922, although two of these were converted into destroyer transports in 1940. They were developments of earlier classes, displaced 1,650 tons (full load) and carried four 4.7-inch (120 mm) guns and six 21-inch (53 cm) torpedo tubes. The siting of some of the weaponry was poor. Two of the four guns were placed amidships, one forward and one abaft the after funnel; in this position they had limited arcs of fire, being restricted by the ships' superstructure. One torpedo tube mounting was ahead of the bridge and liable to be washed over by heavy seas.

By the start of the war, these ships were no longer suitable for fleet duties, being used instead as escorts. Four survived the war.

=== Wakatake ===
Eight Wakatake-class (若竹, "Young Bamboo") ships were commissioned between September 1922 and November 1923, seven (one lost in a storm in 1932) served in World War II, one re-rated as a patrol boat. They were small (1,100 tons) second-class destroyers, developed from the Momi class. Armament consisted of three 4.7-inch (120 mm) guns (one replaced by two triple 25mm weapons in 1941–1942) and four 21-inch (53 cm) torpedo tubes. Minesweeping and minelaying capabilities were replaced by depth charge launchers.

As with other destroyers of their age, they were unsuitable for fleet operations by the start of the war with the United States and served as escorts. Their shallow draft allowed their inshore use in China and the Philippines. One ship survived the war.

=== Kamikaze ===
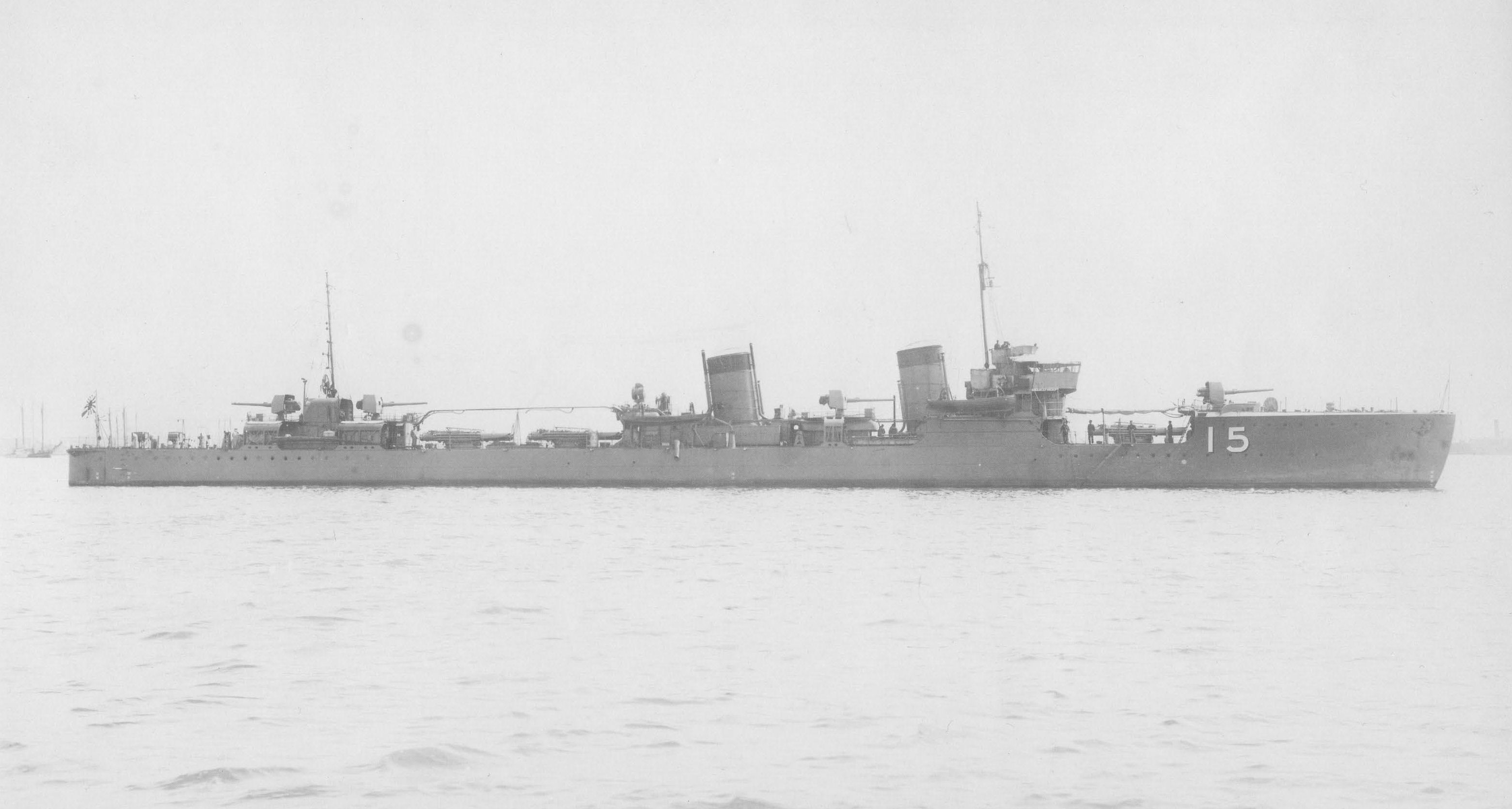
Kamikaze class (神風型駆逐艦)

Nine Kamikaze-class (神風, "Divine Wind") ships were commissioned between December 1922 and December 1924. They were similar to the Minekaze class, with an enlarged bridge and broader beam to compensate. The construction of this class was cut short by Japan's participation in the Washington Naval Treaty of 1922.

Ships of the class were active in several Japanese sea-borne landings in Malaya, the Philippines and the Dutch East Indies. In the last case, they defended the landings against the Allied cruisers HMAS Perth and USS Houston at the Battle of Sunda Strait, with the Harukaze landing one of the four torpedo hits that sank Perth. Two survived the war, Harukaze and Kamikaze herself, and were scrapped soon after.

=== Mutsuki ===
Twelve Mutsuki-class (睦月, "First Moon") ships were commissioned between November 1925 and July 1927. They were developed from the Kamikaze class and introduced the new 24-inch (61 cm) Type 93 torpedo. These were in triple mounts, allowing the reduction of torpedo placements from three to two. Half of the class were rebuilt in 1935–36, receiving shields to the torpedo tubes, strengthened hulls and modifications to funnels. Further changes occurred in 1941–1942 when many were converted to fast transports, with reduced gunnery.

All Mutsuki-class ships were lost during the war.

=== Fubuki ===
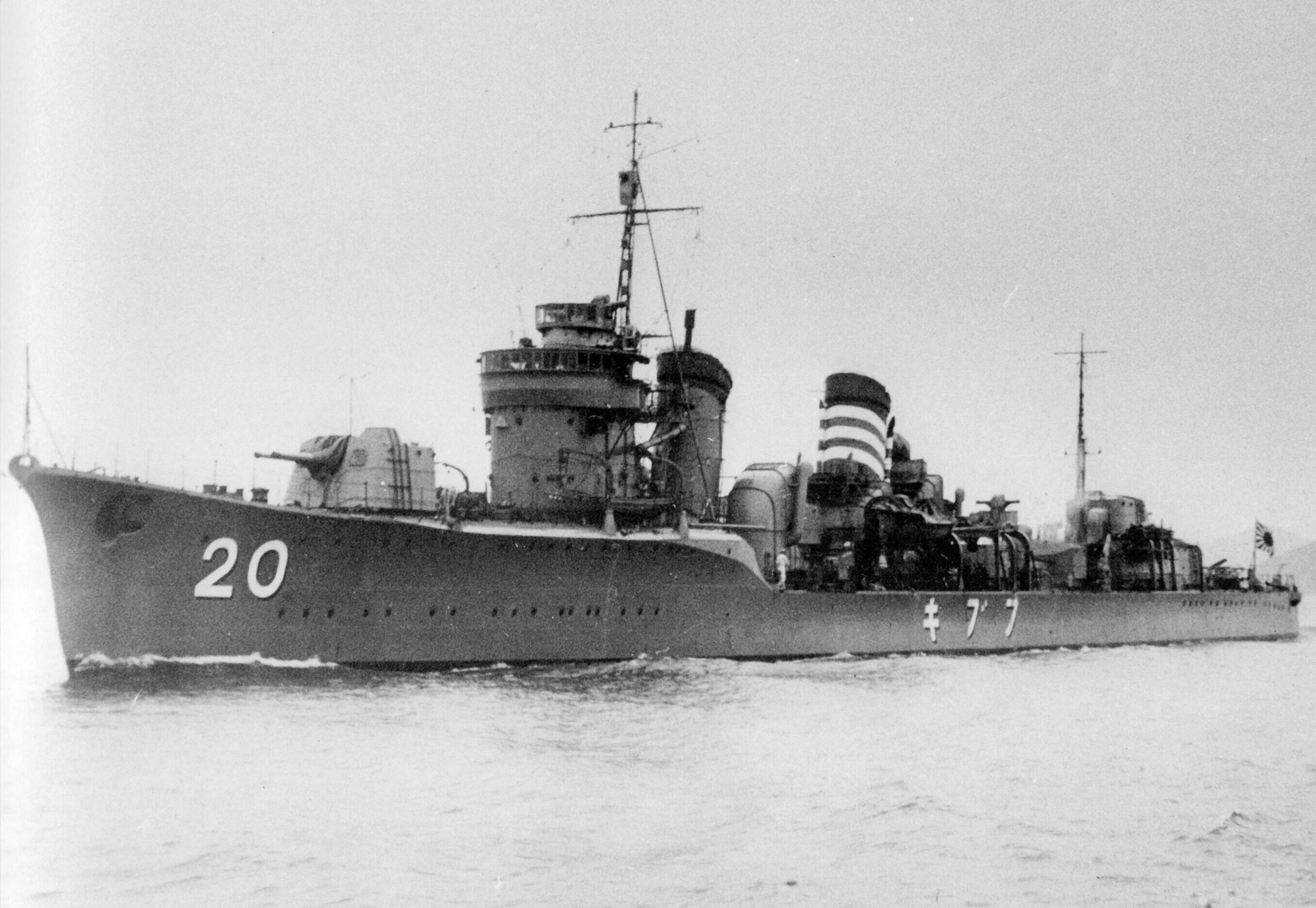
First group Fubuki class (吹雪型駆逐艦)

The twenty Fubuki-class (吹雪, "Snowstorm"), or "Special Type", destroyers were commissioned between May 1928 and May 1932. They were a completely new design and a radical change from their predecessors.

The 1922 Washington Naval Treaty had limited the tonnage of Japanese warships and, to counteract this, the IJN sought to build a high quality, technologically advanced navy. The Fubukis resulted from this. Treaty provisions pointed to an individual ship displacement of 1,400 tons, but this was disregarded: the proposals of 1924 resulted in nearly 1,800 tons.

The design changes included 5-inch guns, twin mounted in weatherproof, splinter-proof turrets, the transfer aft of torpedo tubes from forward of the bridge, a high, covered bridge and an improved power plant. The new positioning of the torpedo tubes enabled the extension aft of the forecastle and thus greatly improved the ships' seakeeping. Two types of turret were fitted. Type A, with 40° elevation were superseded by Type B with 75° elevation, but neither were satisfactory as anti-aircraft mountings. Anti-aircraft weaponry was otherwise inadequate and it was progressively strengthened during refits, with a final count of 22 25mm (1 in) guns in some vessels. The Type 93 torpedo had proved itself and was installed in this and all subsequent classes.

Although an impressive and powerful specification, the Fubukis suffered from design flaws. In order to squeeze the required performance into the required displacement, weight had been saved by the use of light alloys, lighter machinery and the use of welded construction. The reduction of weight within the hulls, and the mass of superstructure, produced potentially unstable vessels, but this was not appreciated until March 1934, when the torpedo boat Tomozuru capsized and the IJN reviewed all of its ships' designs. In addition, five ships were severely damaged (in two instances, the bows were lost) in a typhoon and another five had lesser damage to their hulls.

As a result, in 1937 and 1938, all Fubukis had their bridges and other superstructure reduced and magazines converted to oil storage (this would act as ballast). The last members of the class to be built were equipped with lighter Type C turrets with reduced elevation. Despite the increased weight (to 2,090 tons) leading to a loss of speed (by 1 knot {1.8 km/h, 1.2 mph}), these destroyers remained amongst the best warships of their type.

One ship survived the war, the Ushio, which was scrapped in 1948.

=== Akatsuki ===
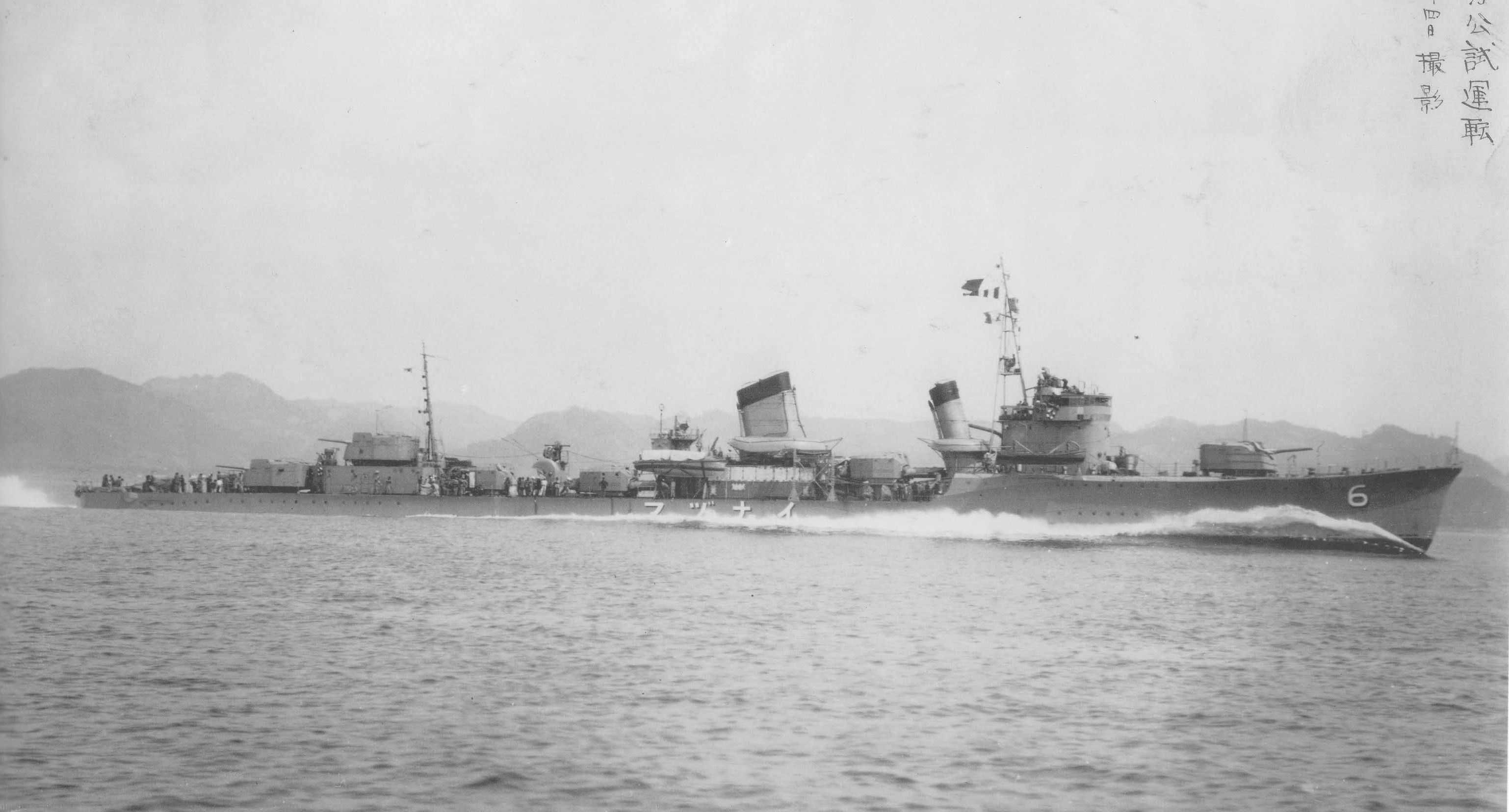
Akatsuki class (暁型駆逐艦)

The four Akatsuki-class (暁, "Daybreak") ships were commissioned between August 1932 and March 1933. They were derived from the preceding Fubuki design. They were lighter than the Fubukis, with less powerful machinery. Improved design meant they produced comparable power with just three boilers, rather than four. The bridge was enlarged, and new firecontrol systems were fitted. Torpedo tubes were fitted with shields, and reloads were carried.

They also had the same design issues of stability and hull strength which were similarly corrected. The resulting increase in displacement reduced their maximum speed to 34 kt (63 km/h, 39 mph). Hibiki had the distinction of being IJN's first all-welded ship.

Three were lost during the war, and the lone survivor, the Hibiki, was transferred to the Soviet Union postwar.

=== Hatsuharu ===
The six Hatsuharu-class (初春, "Early Spring") ships were commissioned between September 1933 and March 1935. They were reduced versions of the preceding Akatsuki design, resulting from the restrictions of the 1930 London Naval Treaty. A further six incomplete vessels were redesigned in the light of stability problems and eventually commissioned as Shiratsuyus.

With much ingenuity, the Treaty limitations were (nearly) adhered to and displacement was a little over 1500 tons. Despite this, the Hatsuharus retained all but one of the Special Types' 5-inch guns and introduced the oxygen-powered version of the 24-inch torpedo. They introduced a forward, superfiring single 5-inch gun and retained the tall bridge structure. The impact of the Tomozuru incident, which exposed the instability of contemporary Japanese warship designs, affected the Hatsuharus and the two that had been completed and four more under construction were significantly redesigned. The forward single gun was moved aft to a lower position, the bridge and other structures were reduced or removed and ballast was added. Displacement increased to 2,090 tons and speed was consequently reduced.

These ships saw service throughout the Pacific, from the Aleutians to the Solomon Islands. All were lost before the Japanese surrender.

=== Shiratsuyu ===
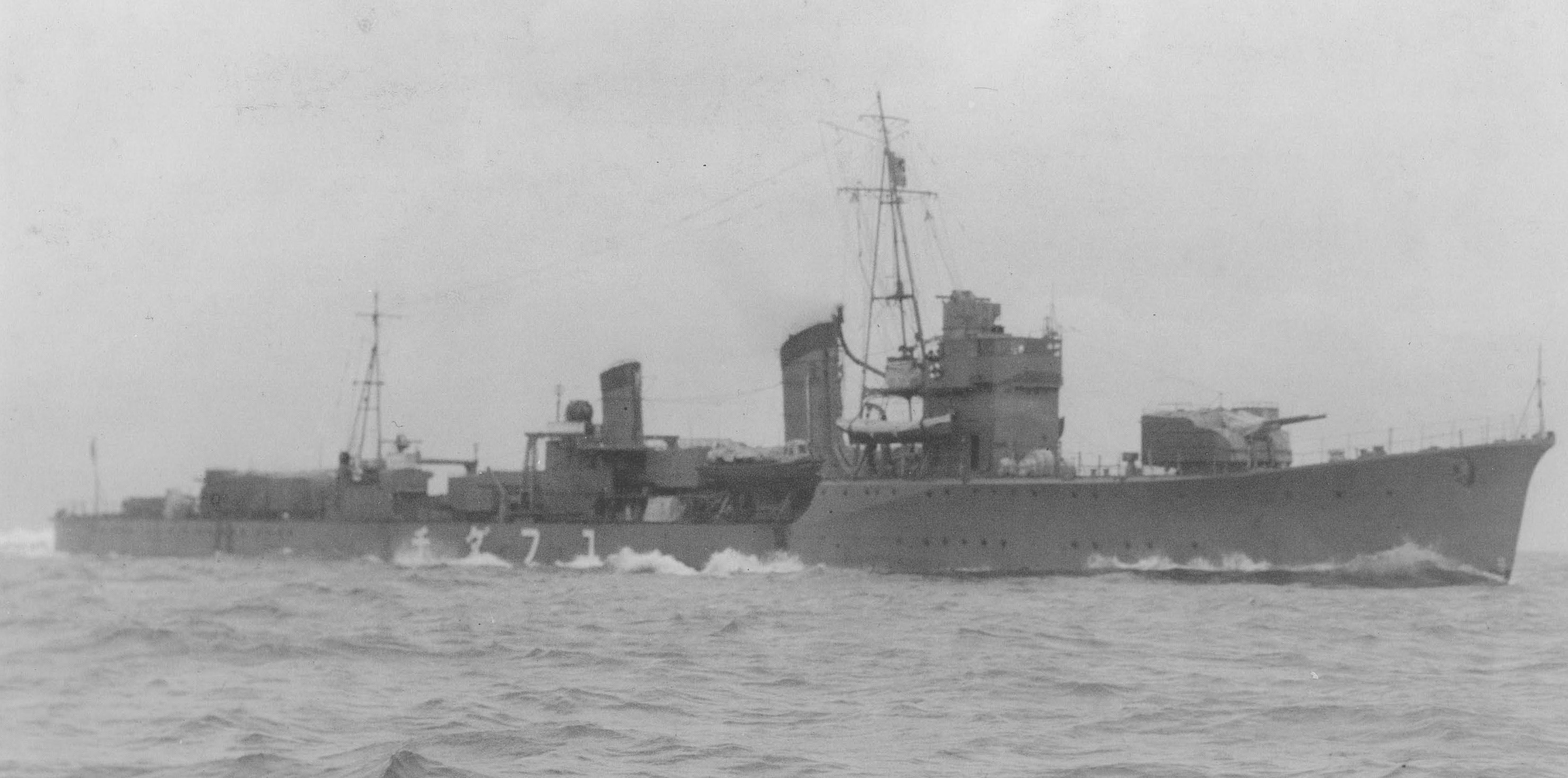
Shiratsuyu class (白露型駆逐艦)

The ten Shiratsuyu-class (白露, "White Dew") ships were commissioned between August 1936 and August 1937. They were redesigned Hatsuharas (six, later increased to ten), in the light of the Tomozuru incident.

These were very similar to the Hatsuharus but with a narrower and deeper hull and greater displacement (1,710 tons). The gun layout of the Hatsuharus was retained but Type C gun houses were used and the torpedo mountings were quadruples, for the first time. The four added ships were further developed, showing an evolution into the succeeding Asashios.

All ten were lost during the war.

=== Asashio ===
The ten Asashio-class (朝潮, "Morning Tide") ships were commissioned between August 1937 and June 1938. They were developments of preceding designs with the intention of combining the firepower of the Fubukis with the designed stability of the Shiratsuyus. The outcome was a displacement in excess of Japan's commitments under the London Naval Treaty, from which Japan had already decided to withdraw.

Six 5-inch guns were mounted in three Type C turrets, with the two aft turrets super-firing (i.e., one turret mounted higher than and firing over the other). Stability was sustained by an increase in the beam. Engine power was increased. Despite preceding experience, there were two significant defects in the design, however. Rudder design did not give the required turning circle and the stern was redesigned as transom. The new engines suffered damage to the turbine blades, a problem not solved until 1943.

The class was active in the landings in the Dutch East Indies, Battle of Midway and the Solomon Islands. All were lost during the war.

=== Kagerō ===
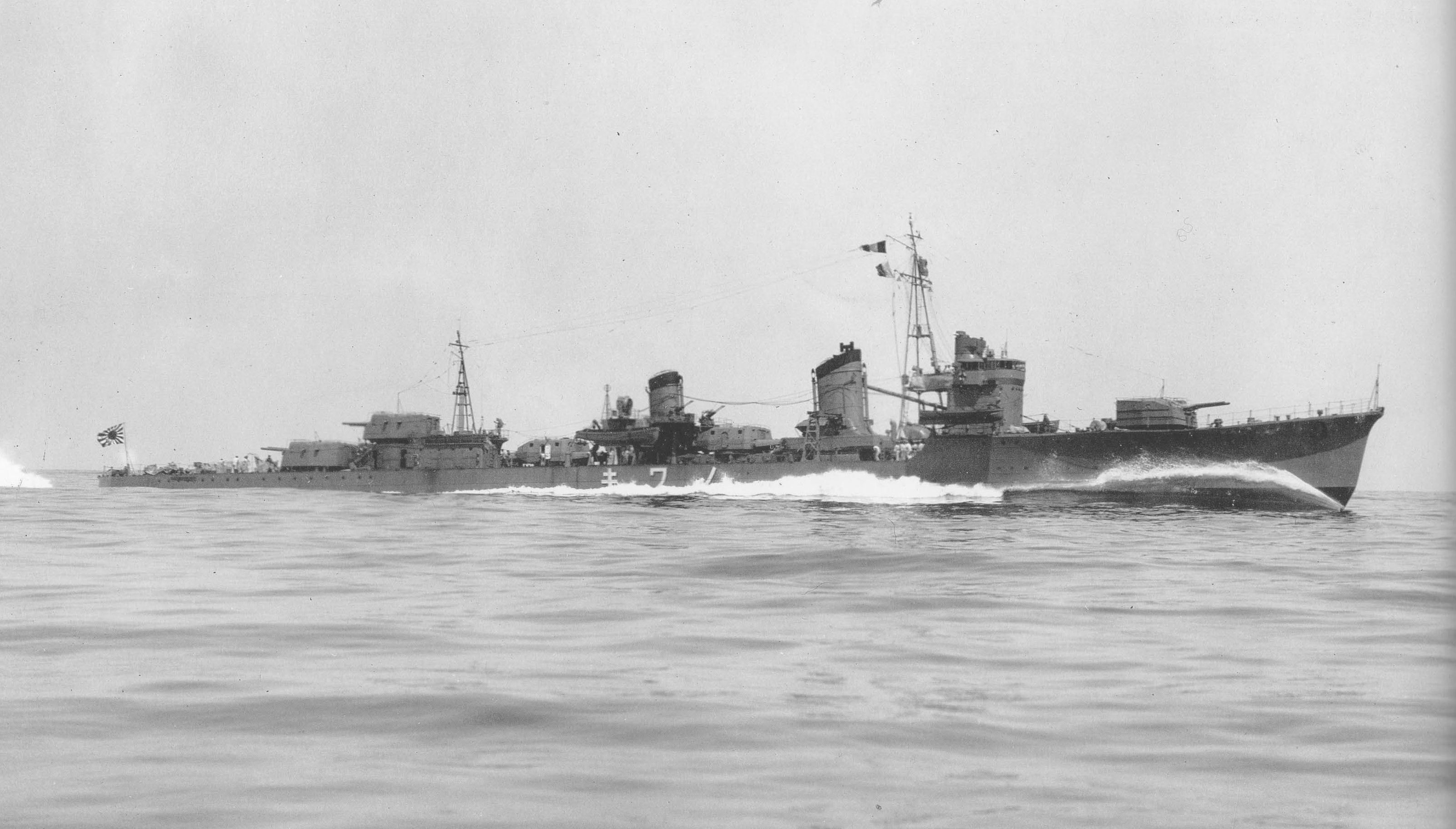
Kagerō class (陽炎型駆逐艦)

The eighteen-ship Kagerō class (陽炎, "Heat Haze") was commissioned between November 1939 and July 1941. In 1937, Japan withdrew from the London Naval Treaty and the Kagerōs were designed free of these restrictions, utilising experience drawn from previous classes.

The outcome was a class of ships exceeding 2,500 tons. Solutions to the stability problems of earlier classes were incorporated in the design, with a lower bridge and a slightly wider and deeper hull. Weaponry was restored to the six 5-inch guns of the Fubukis, in Type C mountings, and eight 24-inch torpedoes, in two quadruple mountings with improved reloading facilities, were also fitted. New engines and machinery layouts were used to improve performance and weight. As completed, there was no improvement to anti-submarine and anti-aircraft (AA) weaponry, somewhat surprisingly in view of Japan's commitment to naval aviation and the anti-aircraft capability of the subsequent Akizuki class. During 1943 and 1944, however, the AA outfit was improved on the surviving ships and radar was fitted.

Ships of the class screened the force that attacked Pearl Harbor. They were also present in the Philippines, Midway, and the Dutch East Indies. Only one ship, the Yukikaze, survived the war, and was transferred to the Taiwanese navy.

=== Shimakaze ===
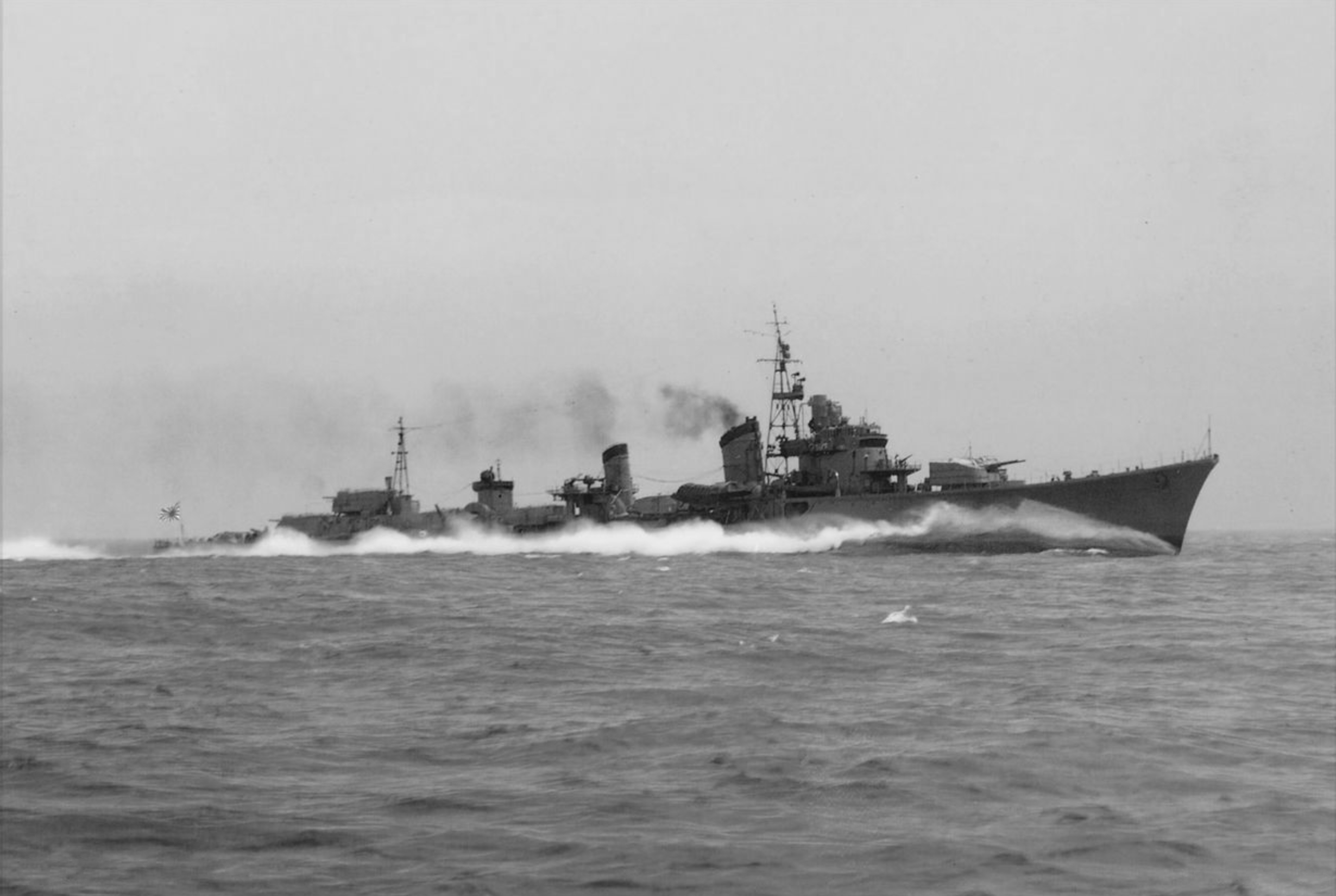
Shimakaze (島風)

Shimakaze (島風, "Island Wind"), the sole member of its class, was commissioned in May 1943. It was an experimental design for high speed.

Within a significantly larger hull that displaced 2,600 tons, a new turbine design gave 50% more power than earlier designs and enabled trials speeds of over 40 knots (74 km/h, 46 mph). The standard six five-inch guns were retained but in Type D turrets with greater elevation. The larger hulls allowed 15 torpedo tubes in three quintuple mounts. During 1943/44, the AA gunnery was improved and radar was fitted.

The class, of which Shimakaze was the prototype, was not ordered. She was sunk in the Philippines in November 1944.

=== Yūgumo ===
The twenty Yūgumo-class (夕雲, "Evening Clouds") ships were commissioned between September 1941 and May 1944. They were continuation of the earlier Kagerō class, with some changes.

The hull was marginally longer and broader and the main guns were mounted in Type D turrets. The anti-aircraft weaponry was improved during 1943–44, completed ships had one 5-inch turret removed to allow room for additional 25-millimetre weapons, but incomplete ones had extra space built in and retained all six 5-inch guns. Ships of this class were commissioned in March 1942 and later were the first Japanese destroyers to be completed with radar (Types 13 and 22).

All of the class were lost during the war.

=== Akizuki ===
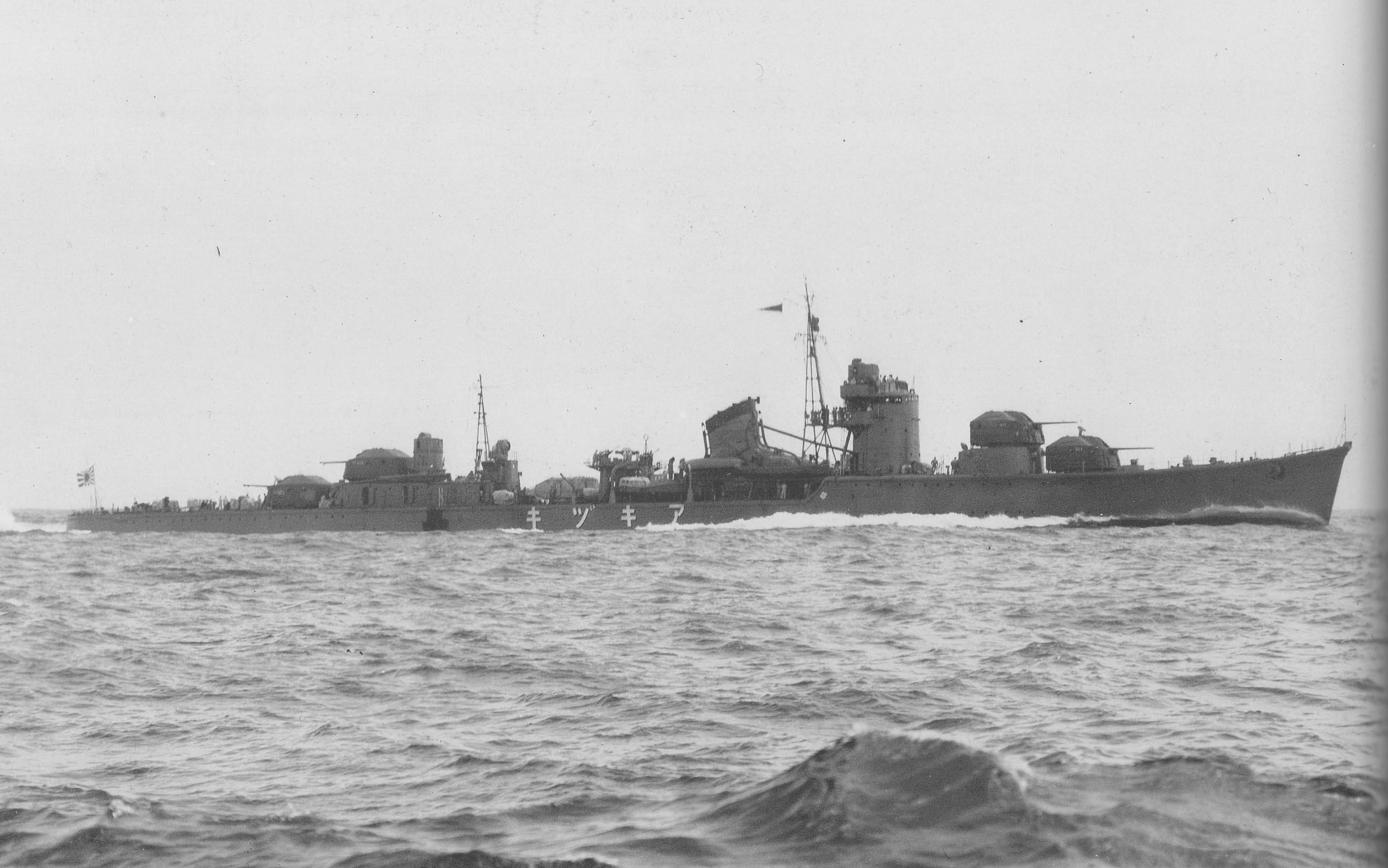
Akizuki class (秋月型駆逐艦)

The sixteen Akizuki-class (秋月, "Autumn Moon") ships were commissioned between June 1942 and January 1945. They were originally intended as anti-aircraft ships, but were instead completed as general purpose destroyers. This class was the first to be equipped with radar.

The design diverged from the IJN destroyer standard of six 5-inch (127 mm) guns, instead mounting eight 3.9-inch (100 mm) high-velocity guns in four twin high-angle mountings. Their rapid fire, 90° elevation and excellent AA fire control system provided an effective dual purpose weapon to the Imperial Japanese Navy for the first time. In fact, the 100 mm's range and rate of fire both exceeded the U.S. Navy's standard 5-inch (127 mm)/38 calibre. Four 24 in (61 cm) torpedo tubes, plus depth charge throwers, were added as the requirements changed to a general-purpose warship. The heavier gun mountings and the extra super-firing mounting required a significantly larger hull than the Yūgumos to ensure stability. The class displaced 2,740 tons.

The class was incomplete at the end of the war; three were cancelled and one was scrapped before its launch. A further 32 planned ships to improved designs (Arashikaru and Yamatsuki groups) were cancelled due to raw material shortages. Six Akizukis survived the war, of which two were scrapped and four were ceded to Allied navies (China, UK, USA, USSR).

=== Matsu ===
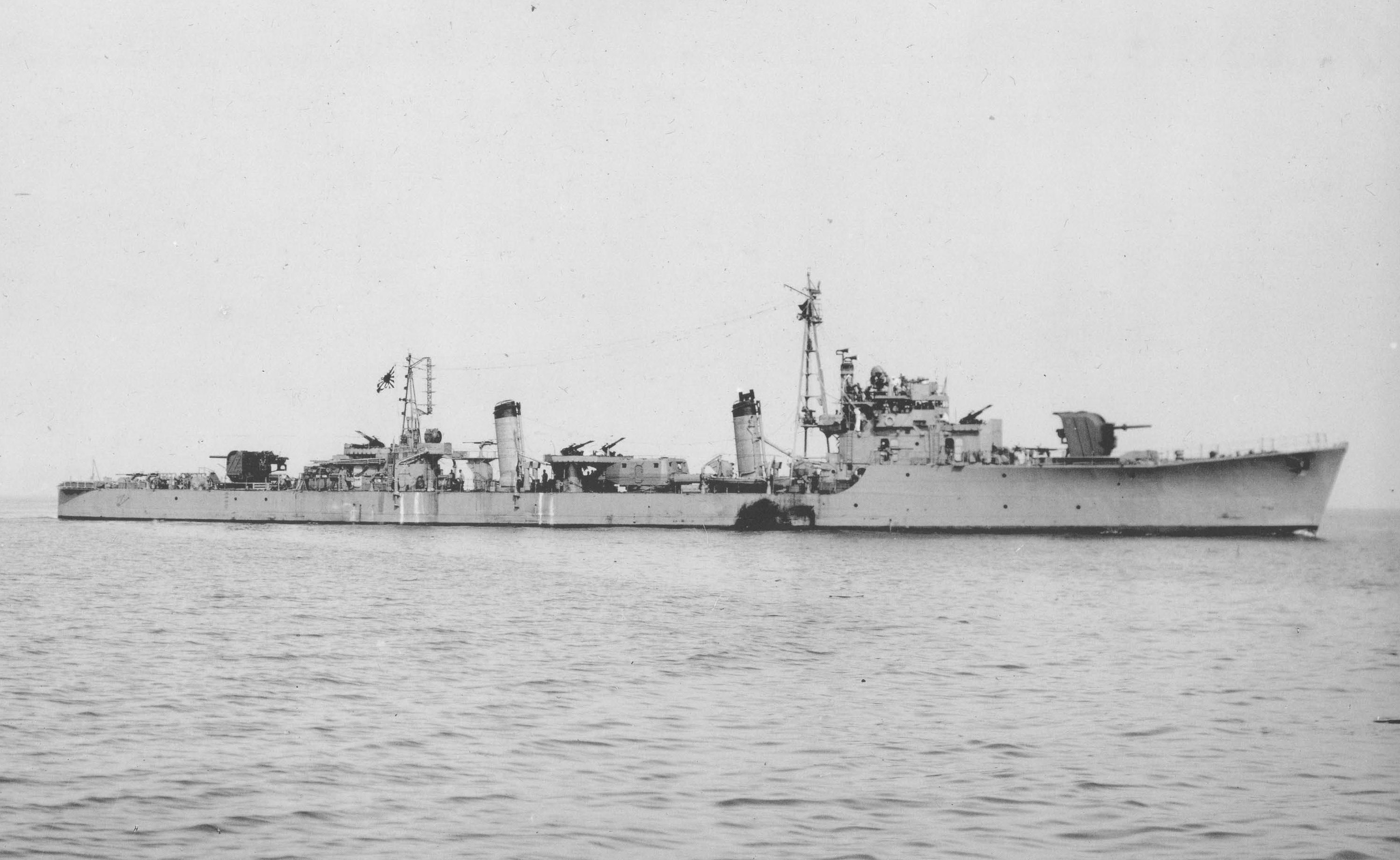
Matsu class (松型駆逐艦)

The eighteen Matsu-class (松, "Pine Tree") destroyers were commissioned between April 1944 and January 1945. This class were a simplified destroyer design introduced to speed construction times and intended to be used for escort and supply missions. The urgent need for replacements arose from the severe losses around the Solomon Islands in 1942.

The design criteria were speed of build, improved damage-control and anti-aircraft and torpedo capabilities. The hull design was simplified and shorter than the Fubukis, partly due to a reduction in the number of boilers, which itself resulted in a significant reduction in speed. The heretofore standard six 5-inch/50 calibre weapons were replaced by three Type 89 5-inch/40 calibre guns which performed better than its predecessor in an AA role. The enclosed turrets were also replaced by a forward single open shield and an aft twin open mounting. This major redesign delivered a significantly smaller ship (1,280 tons). A number of the class were modified to transport kaiten.

Eleven additional ships were cancelled and replaced by a greater number of Tachibanas. Seven Matsus were sunk during the war, three were scrapped and eight were ceded to Allied navies.

=== Tachibana ===
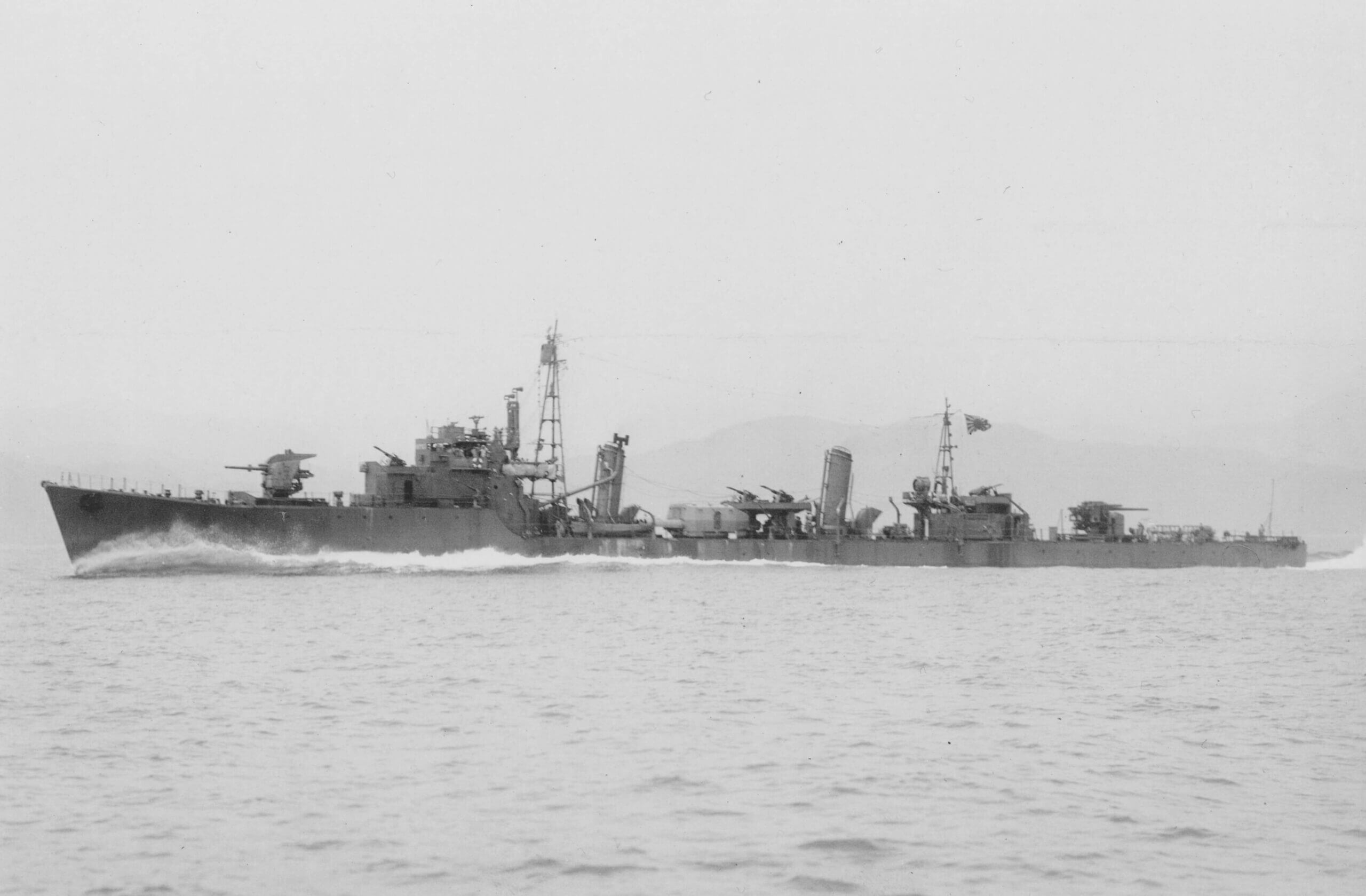
Tachibana class (橘型駆逐艦)

Fourteen Tachibana-class (橘, "Tachibana orange") ships were commissioned between January and June 1945. Another four were launched but not completed and five were not launched before the Japanese surrender. They were a development of the Matsu class, with further simplifications to the design.

Four were lost in ports or home waters in the final weeks of the war and the remainder were scrapped or given to Allied navies.

== Torpedo boats ==
In 1930, the London Naval Treaty was concluded in which the IJN received a heavy limit on the destroyers. The IJN planned to build the under 600 ton-class destroyer which were not limited by the treaty, and the category of torpedo boat was revived for them. The aim for these ships was to have half the armament of the Fubuki-class destroyer.

Two classes of large torpedo boats were subsequently built and employed by the Imperial Japanese Navy:

=== Chidori class ===
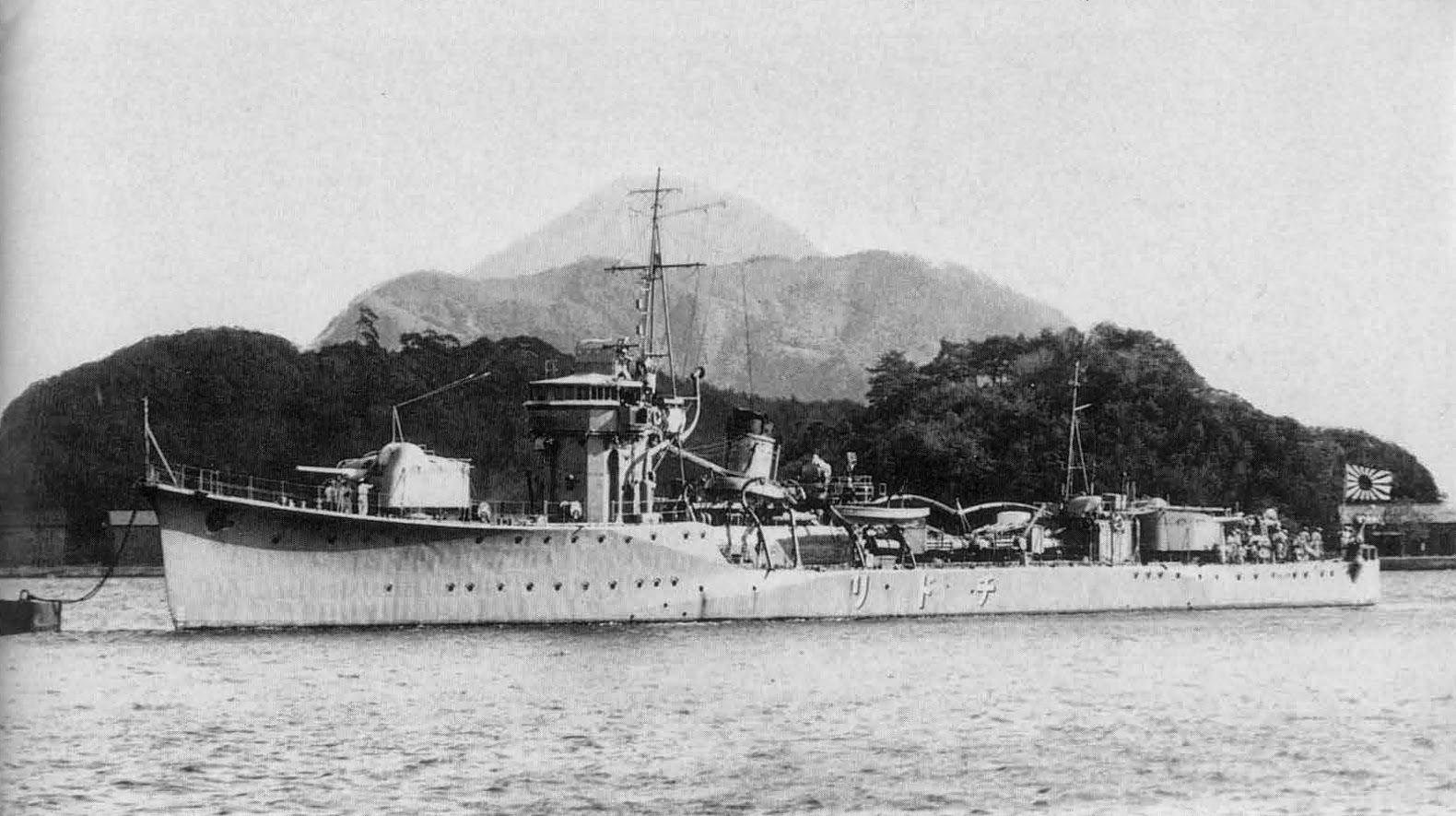
Chidori class (千鳥型水雷艇)

Four Chidori-class (千鳥) ships were ordered under the 1931 Building Programme (as Nos. 1 to 4) and commissioned between November 1933 and July 1934. They displaced 738 tons (full load) and originally carried three 5.0-inch (127 mm) guns, one 12.7mm(0.5 in) AA machine gun, four 533 mm (21.0 in) torpedo tubes (two twin mounts) and up to nine depth charges.

On 12 March 1934, shortly after completion, Tomozuru (友鶴) sailed in company with her sister Chidori (千鳥) and the light cruiser Tatsuta for night torpedo training. The weather worsened during the exercise and it was called off at 0325; the ships returned to port. Tomozuru never arrived and a search was launched. She was spotted at 1405 that same day, capsized, but still afloat. Thirteen of her 113-man crew were rescued. She was towed to Sasebo and docked where she was rebuilt and returned to service.

After the Tomozuru incident, the Chidoris exchanged their 127mm (5.0 in) Type 3 guns for hand-worked 4.7-inch (120 mm) 11th Year Type M guns, landed the rear twin torpedo tube mount, and the bridge structure was cut down by one level. The bulges were removed, but displacement increased to 815 long tons (828 t) with the addition of 60–90 tonnes (59–89 long tons; 66–99 short tons) ballast. Their speed dropped to 28 knots (32 mph; 52 km/h) and range to 1,600 nmi (3,000 km) at 14 kn (16 mph; 26 km/h). Their successors, the Ōtori-class torpedo boats, were redesigned to reduce the top-heaviness that caused Tomozuru to capsize.

=== Ōtori class ===
Sixteen Ōtori-class (鴻) large torpedo boats were ordered (as Nos. 5 to 20) under the 1934 Building Programme to incorporate modifications made to the Chidori class. The last eight of these were cancelled in favour of additional submarine chasers, but the remaining eight were commissioned between October 1936 and September 1937. They displaced 960 tons (full load) and carried three 4.7-inch (120 mm) guns, one Vickers 40mm AA gun, one 12.7mm(0.5 in) AA machine guns, six 533mm (21.0 in) torpedoes, and two paravanes. Later up to 48 depth charges were added.

== Ocean Defence Ships ==
In addition to proper destroyers, the Imperial Japanese Navy also employed 178 Kaibōkan "ocean defence ships", (Kai = sea, ocean, Bo = defence, Kan = ship), to denote a multi-purpose vessel. They were initially intended for patrol and fishery protection, minesweeping and as convoy escorts.

They were Japanese equivalent to American destroyer escorts. Like their American counterparts, they were mass-produced during the war as a less expensive anti-submarine warfare alternative to fleet destroyers.

Seven classes of Kaibōkan were built in total:

=== Shimushu ===
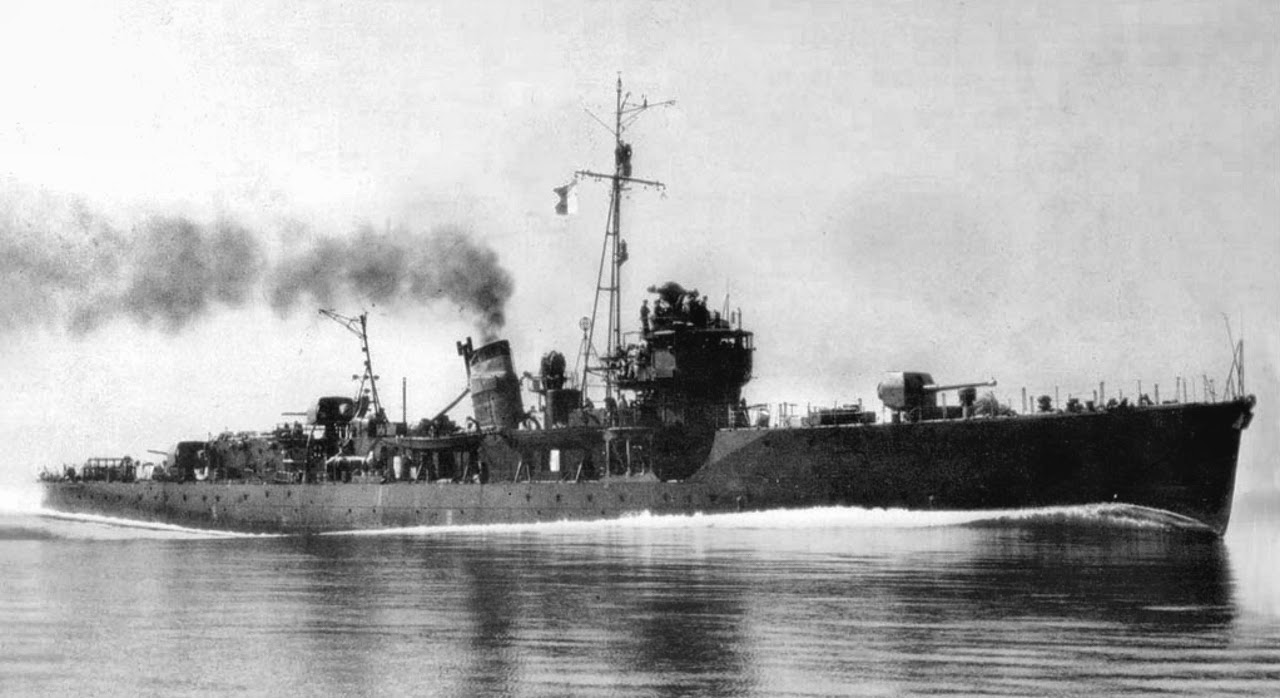
Shimushu class (占守型海防艦)

Four Shimushu-class (占守) or Type A ocean defence ships were ordered under the 1937 Programme and commissioned between June 1940 and March 1941. They displaced 1,020 tons (full load) and carried three 4.7-inch (120 mm) guns (taken from World War I-era destroyers) and six depth charge throwers, up to 60 depth charges and one 81mm (3.2 in) A/S trench mortar.

=== Etorofu ===
Fourteen Etorofu-class (択捉) or Modified Type A ocean defence ships were commissioned between May 1943 and 1945. They displaced 1,020 tons (full load) and carried three 4.7-inch (120 mm) guns and six depth charge throwers, up to 60 depth charges and one 81mm (3.2 in) mortar.

The Etorofu class was an improved version of the preceding Shimushu class with a greater emphasis on anti-submarine warfare.

=== Mikura ===
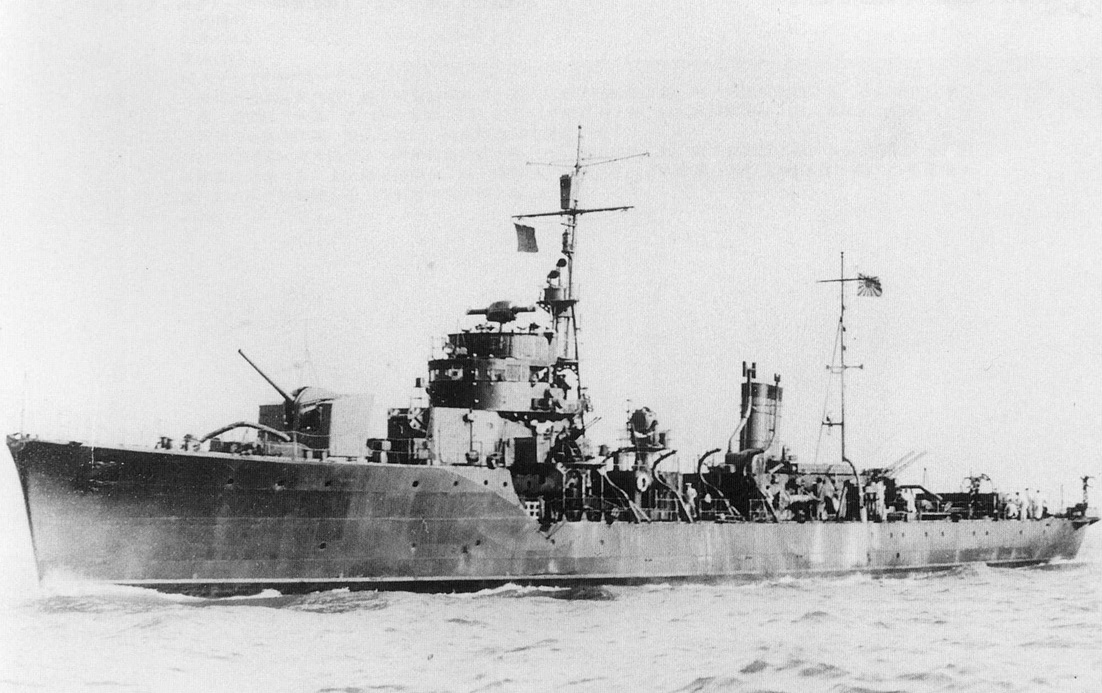
Mikura class (御蔵型海防艦)

Eight Mikura-class (御蔵) or Type B ocean defence ships were commissioned between October 1943 and 1945. They displaced 1,020 tons (full load) and carried three 4.7-inch (120 mm) guns and six depth charge throwers, up to 120 depth charges and one 81mm (3.2 in) mortar.

The eight ships of the Mikura class served as convoy escorts during World War II. They were denoted "Type B" and were the third class of Kaibokan. The Mikuras, unlike the preceding Etorofu and Shimushu classes, were dedicated to the anti-aircraft (AA) and anti-submarine role.

=== Hiburi ===
Nine Hiburi-class (日振) or Modified Type B ocean defence ships were commissioned between June 1944 and April 1945. Two further vessels were never completed. They displaced 940 tons (full load) and carried three 4.7-inch (120 mm) guns, two depth charge projectors, six depth charge throwers and up to 120 depth charges.

The nine ships of the Hiburi class served as convoy escorts during World War II.

=== Ukuru ===
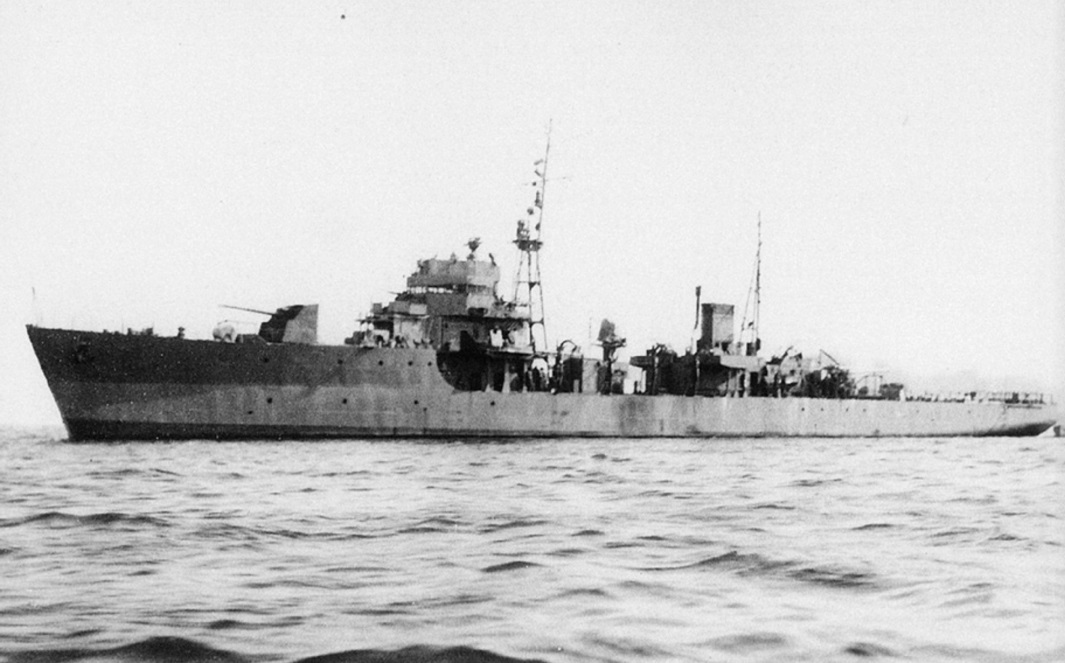
Ukuru class (鵜来型海防艦)

Twenty-two Ukuru-class (鵜来) or Modified Type B ocean defence ships were built but the last two were never completed. The other twenty were commissioned between July 1944 and April 1945. These numbers exclude nine completed and two uncompleted ships which were built to the Hiburi sub-class design. They displaced 1,020 tons (full load) and carried three 4.7-inch (120 mm) guns, 4 (later 16) 25mm (0.98 in) AA machine guns, 16 depth charge throwers, two depth charge projectors, two depth charge chutes, up to 120 depth charges and one 81mm (3.2 in) mortar.

The Ukurus, like Mikuras, were dedicated to the anti-aircraft (AA) and anti-submarine role. The Ukuru class was a further simplification of Mikura. Ukurus were constructed using prefabricated sections that enabled them to be built in as little as four months. Despite being easy to build, they proved quite durable, with 11 occurrences of the class striking mines and only 3 sinking, one of which was after the war. Ikuna survived being torpedoed by USS Crevalle and striking a mine as well.

=== Type C ===
A hundred and thirty-two Type C (丙型) ships were ordered but only fifty-six were commissioned between February 1944 and 1945. A further 168 ships were planned under the 1944–45 Programme but were never ordered. They displaced 1,020 tons (full load) and carried three 4.7-inch (120 mm) guns, six 25mm (0.98 in) AA machine guns, 13 depth charge throwers, one depth charge chute, up to 120 depth charges, and one 81mm (3.2 in) mortar.

The Type C Kaibōkan was a further simplification of the Ukuru design. Due to the simplifications of the design, a significant saving was made in construction time. The Type C escorts required approximately 20,000 man-hours each, compared to the 35,000 man-hours of the Ukurus and the 57,000 man-hours of the Mikuras.

=== Type D ===
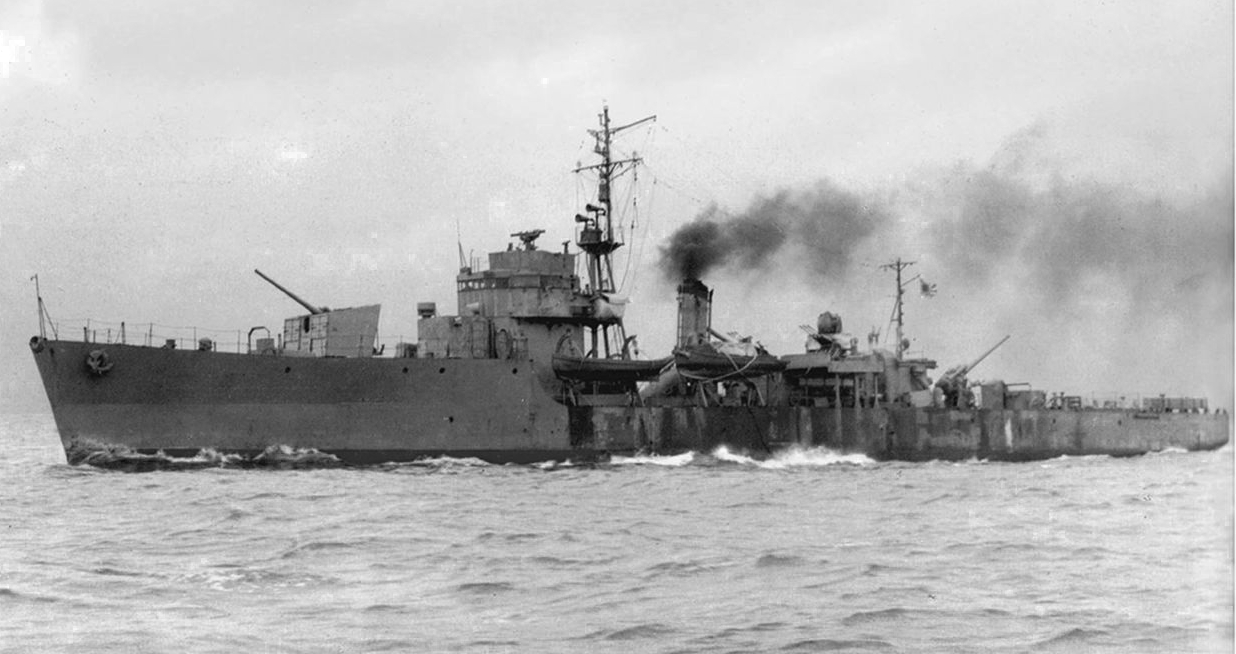
Type D (丁型海防艦)

A hundred and forty-three Type D (丁型) ships were ordered but only sixty-seven were completed and commissioned between February 1944 and July 1945. A further 57 ships were planned under the 1944–45 Programme but were never ordered. They displaced 1,020 tons (full load) and carried three 4.7-inch (120 mm) guns, six 25mm (0.98 in) AA machine guns, 13 depth charge throwers, one depth charge chute, up to 120 depth charges, and one 81mm (3.2 in) mortar.

The Type D version was a further simplification of the Ukuru design and were built to the same design as the Type C escort ship. Due to a shortage of diesel engines to power both groups of vessels, the Type Ds were powered by turbine engines, the only Kaibōkan type to use turbines.

== Notable and Famous destroyers ==
=== Yukikaze ===
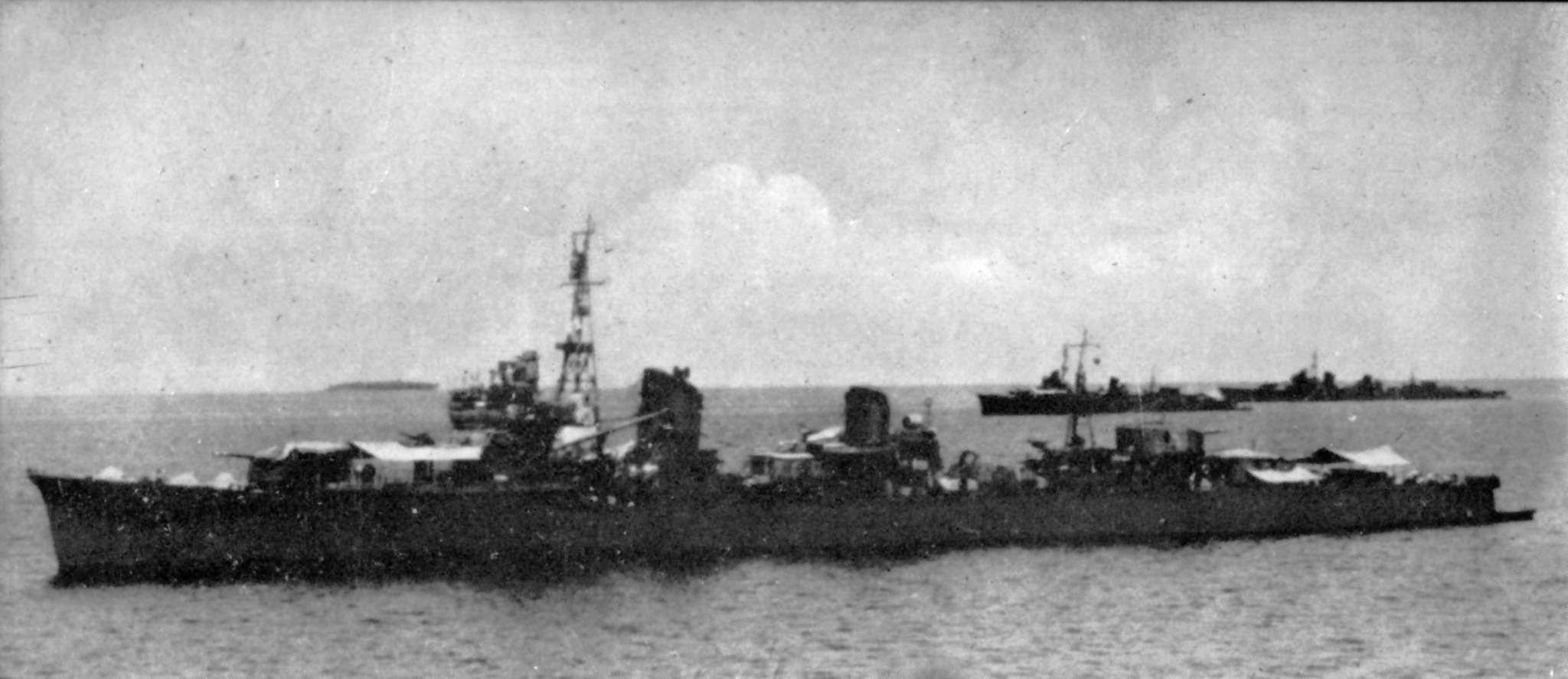
Yukikaze anchored in Rabaul, July of 1943.

The Yukikaze is probably the most famous destroyer of the Imperial Japanese navy in modern times, known as a fortune ship for surviving the entire war without being hit by a single shell, bomb, or torpedo, while fighting in several famous battles. Yukikaze helped to sink the submarine USS Perch on March 3 1943, and escorted carriers during the battle of Santa Cruz, October 26 1942. On November 13 1942, Yukikaze saw combat fighting a US cruiser force at the naval battle of Guadalcanal, helping to sink the destroyer USS Cushing with gunfire before sinking the destroyer USS Laffey with a torpedo hit that blew off her stern, broke her keel, and ignited her turret 4 magazines. She then took on survivors from the wrecked battlecruiser Hiei before scuttling her, then escorted damaged ships to Truk.

Yukikaze took on a variety of escorting duties and transport runs throughout 1943, surviving the defeat that was the battle of the Bismarck Sea throughout March 2–4 undamaged. On July 13, she led the destroyers Hamakaze, Kiyonami, and Yūgure with radar during the battle of Kolombangara. Yukikaze was credited for the torpedo hit that damaged the light cruiser HMNZS Leander so badly she could not be repaired in time to take further part in World War II, then took part in a mass torpedo attack that sank the destroyer USS Gwin and crippled the light cruisers USS Honolulu and USS St. Louis. More secondary roles ensued until she escorted tankers at the defeat which was the battle of the Philippine Sea, June of 1944. Later that October, Yukikaze took part in the battle of Leyte Gulf, witnessing the sinking of several major Japanese warships while in turn assisting in sinking the destroyer USS Johnston. Yukikaze escorted the aircraft carrier Shinano when she was torpedoed and sunk by the submarine USS Archerfish, then escorted battleship Yamato when she was sunk by air attacks. She survived the war intact.

After the war, Yukikaze was transferred to the Taiwanese Navy, and renamed the ROCS Dan Yang. She would see service fighting the Soviets, during which she captured two oil tankers and a cargo ship and took part in two separate shore bombardment missions. The former Yukikaze was decommissioned on November 16 1966, and sold for scrap in 1970.

=== Shigure ===
The Shigure, similar to Yukikaze, was also known as a fortune ship, and famous throughout the Japanese public for her wartime experience, so much so that there was actually a folk saying about the two ships. She was commanded by Tameichi Hara throughout 1943, who later published a book detailing his wartime experience. On August 6-7, she was the only destroyer to survive the battle of Vella Gulf, when the destroyers USS Dunlap, Maury, and Craven attacked a troop transport force with gunfire and torpedoes, sinking the destroyers Kawakaze, Arashi, and Hagikaze. Shigure was hit by a dud torpedo to her rudder. On August 17–18, Shigure assisted in fending off American destroyers during the battle off Horaniu, successfully defending a Japanese troop transport force. On October 6–7, Shigure helped to defend another force of troop transports against US destroyers at the battle of Vella Lavella, before surviving the naval defeat that was the battle of Empress Augusta Bay. Throughout these missions, Shigure had not been hit by a single bomb, shell, or torpedo (that managed to explode) and had not lost a single man in combat, all the while being worn down and in need of refit.

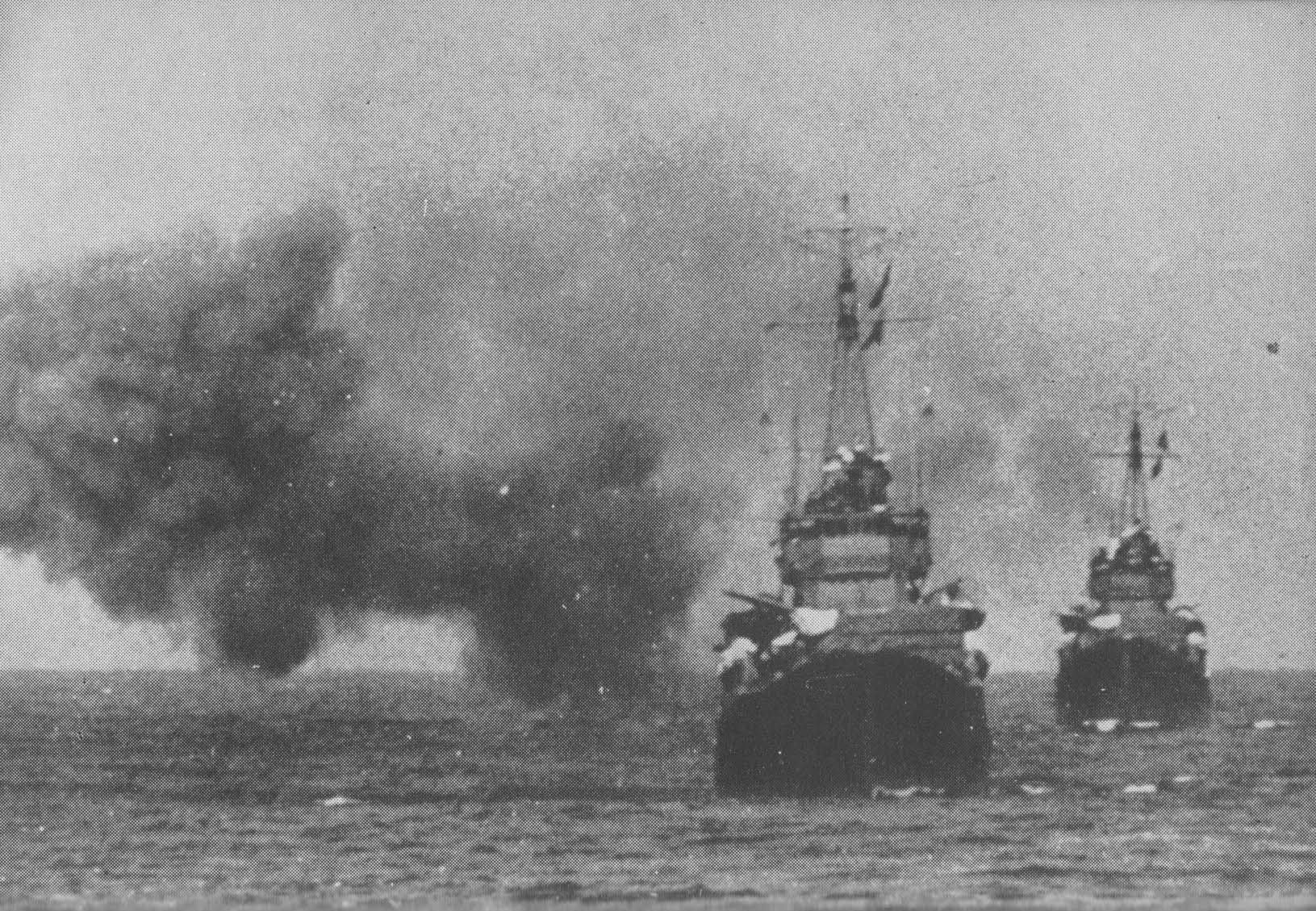
Shigure and her sister ship Samidare on gunnery trails hours before the battle of Vella Lavella, October 6, 1943

Upon being drydocked in November 1943 for repairs, Shigure was heavily publicized for her lucky career as a morale booster for the Japanese public, and Tameichi Hara became a famed war hero. Her efforts were hailed by the Japanese public as legendary, albeit in large part due to Japanese propaganda, such as the untrue claim that Shigure torpedoed and sank an enemy cruiser at the battle off Horaniu. Shigure continued to serve in 1944, and on June 8 was engaged by the light cruisers USS Phoenix and USS Boise, and damaged by a pair of 6-inch (152 mm) shell hits, before escorting carrier during the battle of the Philippine Sea. In October of 1944, part of the overall battle of Leyte Gulf, Shigure was the only ship of the Southern Force to survive the battle of the Surigao Strait, albeit badly damaged from shell hits. During the return to Japan, Shigure helped to sink the submarine USS Growler. She then escorted the aircraft carrier Unryū when she was torpedoed and sunk by the submarine USS Redfish. Ultimately, Shigure's lucky career failed her when on January 24, 1945, she was sunk by the submarine USS Blackfin. However, she sank slowly, allowing for most of her crew to escape.

=== Amatsukaze ===
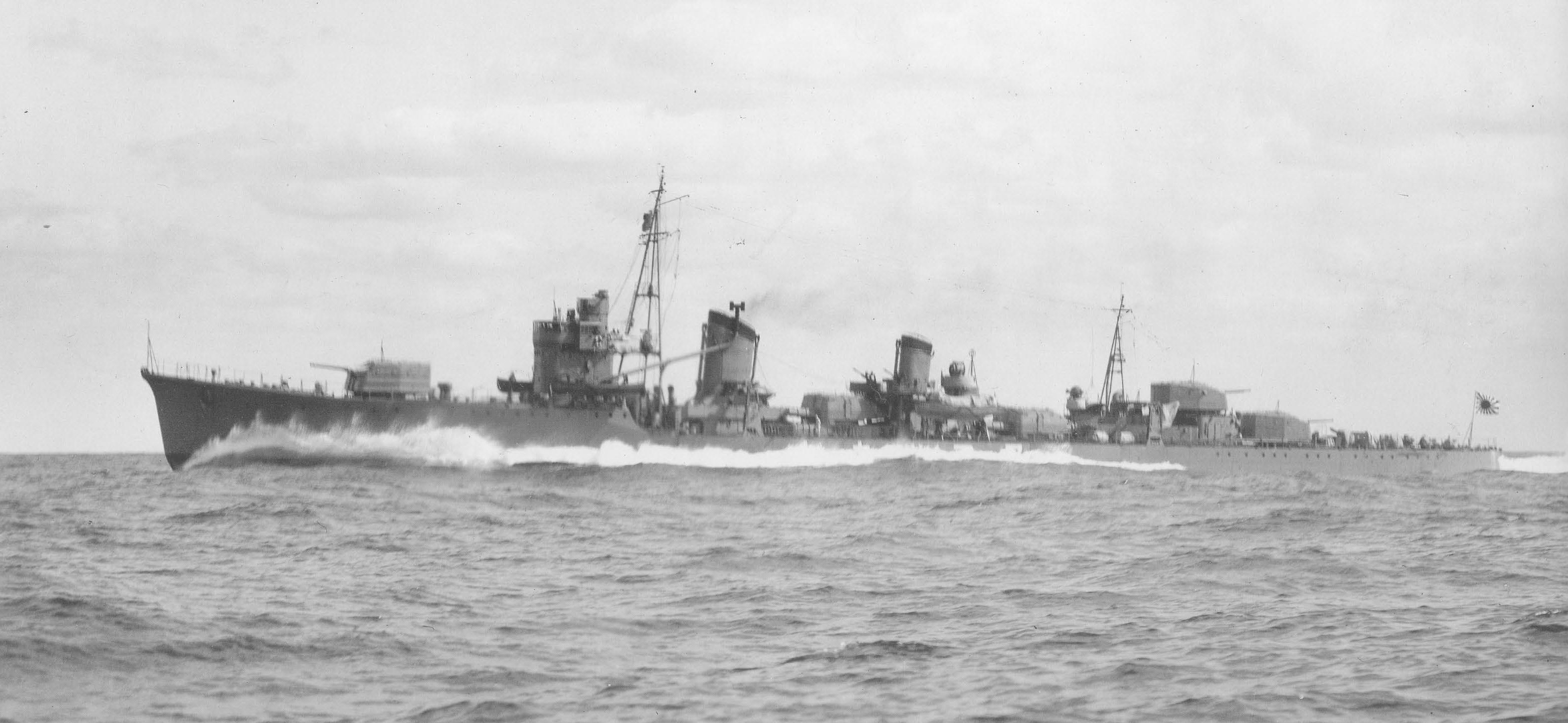
Amatsukaze on sea trials off Uraga, October 17 1940

Amatsukaze was the other destroyer commanded by Tameichi Hara, but from the beginning of the war to January of 1943. She took part in several convoy escorting and shore bombardment duties in the early war, notably when she protected the landings at the Port of Davao by bombarding the pier, sending back 200 machine gunners and destroying a Philippine oil tanker in the process. Amatsukaze took part in the battle of the Java sea but missed her torpedoes, but after the battle she assisted in capturing the hospital ship SS Op Ten Noort and sinking the submarine USS Perch. Amatsukaze was deployed with Yamamoto's battleship force at the battle of Midway, then escorted aircraft carriers during the battles of the Eastern Solomons and Santa Cruz.

Amatsukaze saw her highlight when Captain Hara led her at the naval battle of Guadalcanal on November 13, 1942. With torpedo hits, Amatsukaze sank the destroyer USS Barton and helped to sink the light cruiser USS Juneau, before shelling the crippled heavy cruiser USS San Francisco. In turn, her searchlights attracted the attention of the light cruiser USS Helena, which proceeded to maul Amatsukaze with five 6-inch (152 mm) shell hits, disabling her guns and steering wheel, cutting her speed to 20 knots, and killing 43 men, but Amatsukaze hid behind a smokescreen and escaped the battle. Throughout 1943, Amatsukaze took part in a variety of troop and supply transport missions very successfully, but never saw direct combat. On January 16 1944, Amatsukaze was escorting high-speed transports when she was blown in half by a torpedo fired from the submarine USS Redfin. The forward half sank, but the back half miraculously stayed afloat and was towed to Singapore, where she spent nearly the rest of the war. In March of 1945, Amatsukaze was rigged with a temporary bow and sent back to Japan, but on April 6 was destroyed by US air force bombers. In his book, Tameichi Hara also extensively detailed his career on Amatsukaze.

=== Amagiri ===
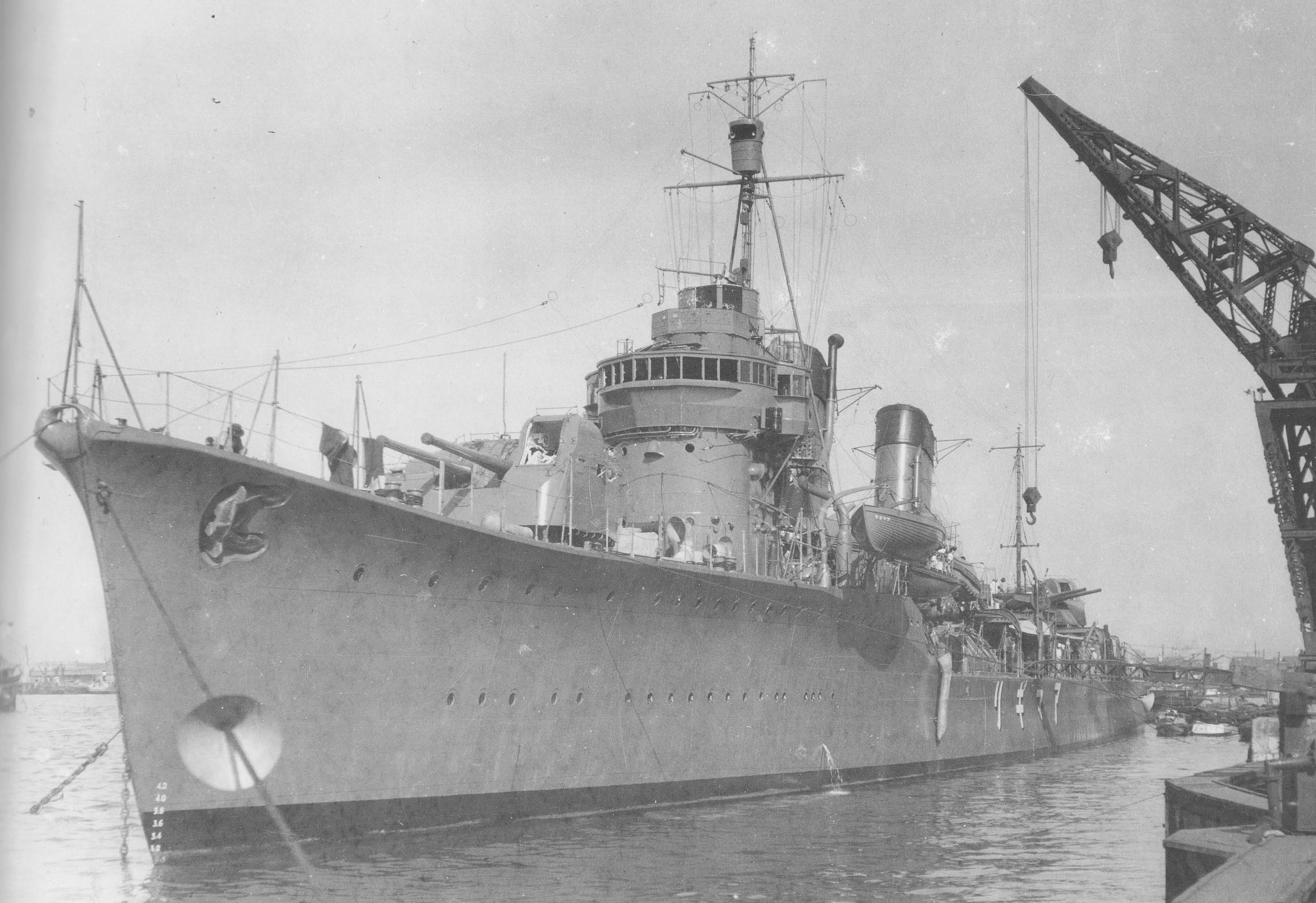
Amagiri being fitted out in November of 1930

The Amagiri saw action several times through the war. She escorted invasion convoys to Malaya and the Dutch East Indies, and on January 26–27 1942, she took part in the battle off Endau, where she helped to sink the elderly destroyer HMS Thanet, before assisting the heavy cruisers Mogami and Mikuma during the Indian Ocean raid, where she helped two sink two steamships and a merchant ship. She undertook troop and supply transport missions during the Guadalcanal Campaign, and fought in the battle of Kula Gulf, July 6 1943, where she lost a gunfight to the destroyer USS Nicholas, being driven away from the battle while being damaged by five 5-inch (127 mm) shells in the process.

However, what made Amagiri such a famous destroyer was an event that occurred on August 2 1943. Amagiri was the lead ship on a troop transport run to the Solomon Islands, when en route they encountered a squadron of US PT boats. Amagiri increased speed and rammed straight into PT-109, splitting the PT boat in half and sinking it. PT-109 was commanded by John F Kennedy, who survived the sinking, and went on to become president of the United States. On November 25, she escaped the battle of Cape Saint George undamaged while fighting off American destroyers. Eventually, on April 23 1944, Amagiri was transporting troops near Borneo when she hit a mine and sank.

=== Arashi ===
The Arashi is well known, but can be classified as an infamous ship due to her blunders at the battle of Midway. Before this, she saw a successful career, escorting convoys to the Philippines and Dutch East Indies, before raiding small Allied warships and other vessels in the Indian Ocean, where she assisted in sinking the destroyer/minelayer HMS Stronghold, the gunboat USS Asheville, and the British tanker Francol. However on June 5 1942, Arashi was alerted of the presence of an American submarine, and engaged the USS Nautilus with depth charges. But Nautilus was in good shape afterwards, and after radioing Arashi's location, Arashi was trailed by a plane from USS Enterprise to the Japanese aircraft carriers and radioed their position to American carriers, leading to a devastating attack which sank four Japanese aircraft carriers and a heavy cruiser. After the battle, Arashi picked a downed USS Yorktown pilot, and subsequently murdered him, making Arashi a direct participant in a war crime to top off her bad fortune.

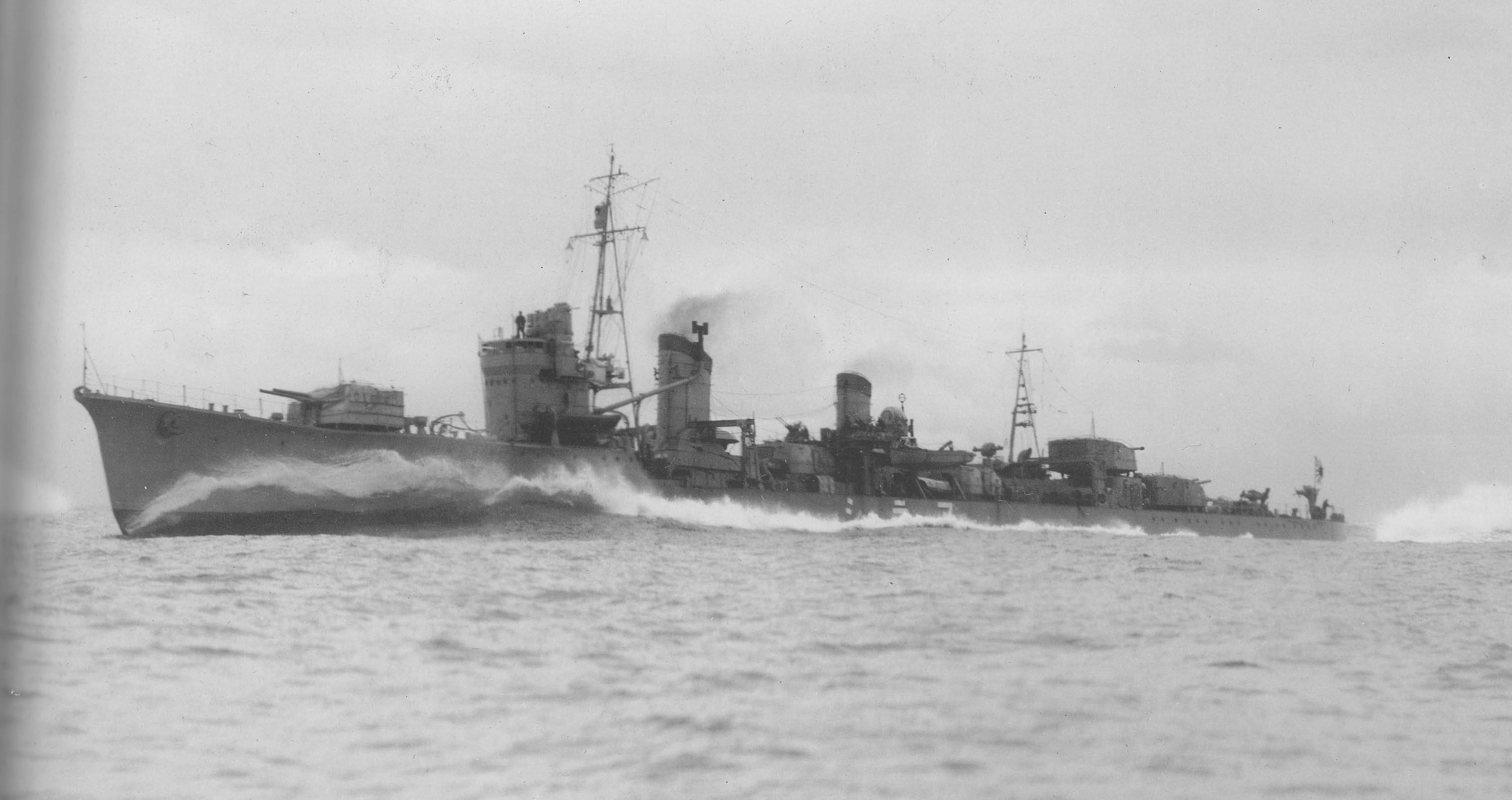
Arashi underway in December of 1940

Arashi took on escorting and transport missions during the Guadalcanal and Solomon Islands campaigns, and on September 6 1942 assisted in sinking the British cargo ship Anshun, and was present when Amagiri sank PT-109. On August 7 1943, Arashi met her fate when the American destroyers USS Dunlap, Craven, and Maury, using radar to take advantage of a rain squall, closed to point blank range and fired out 22 torpedoes. Arashi was hit by two torpedoes fired by Craven and quickly began to sink. While the fatal damage was already dealt, any chance of saving Arashi was lost when subsequent gunfire hits ignited her magazines and sank her instantly. The engagement has become known as the battle of Vella Gulf.

== Weapons systems ==
=== Guns ===
- 4.7in/45 calibre (classes: Momi, Minekaze, Kamikaze, Wakatake & Mutsuki)
- 127mm 1914 type (Fubuki and all subsequent classes except Akizuki)
- 5 inch/40 calibre Type 89 (Matsu)
- 3.9in/65 calibre Type 98 (Akizuki)
- 7.7mm
- 13mm (classes: Akatsuki, Hatsuhara, Shiratsuyu)
- Type 96 25 mm AT/AA Gun (classes: Asashio and all subsequent classes)

=== Gun mountings ===
- 3rd year type 1914 hand-worked
- Type "A" (40° maximum elevation) (Fubuki)
- Type "B" (75° maximum elevation) (classes: Fubuki, Akatsuki, Hatsuharu)
- Type "C" (55° maximum elevation) (classes: Shiratsuyu, Asashio, Kagerō)
- Type "D" (75° maximum elevation) (classes: Shimakaze, Yūgumo)
- 90° maximum elevation enclosed (Akizuki)
- 90° maximum elevation open (Matsu)

=== Fire control ===
- Type 94 Kosha Sochi anti-aircraft (Akizuki)

=== Torpedoes ===
- 45 cm (in Momo and earlier classes)
- 53 cm 6th year Type torpedo (Momi, Minekaze, Kamikaze & Wakatake)
- 61 cm Type 93 torpedo (Mutsuki, Fubuki, Akatsuki; oxygen fuelled in Hatsuharu and all subsequent classes)

=== Radar ===
The first radar sets were installed in Japanese destroyers in March 1942, initially in newly commissioned ships of the Yūgumo class. This continued at an increasing rate through 1943 and 1944, with retro-fitting of existing and even older, pre-1922, vessels.

==== Type 13 ====
Aircraft detection radar experimentally introduced in 1941, widely fitted from March 1943. Effective up to 100 kilometres (62 mi).

==== Type 21 ====
Used for aircraft and ship detection; introduced in August 1943. Effective against aircraft up to 100 kilometres and against ships up to 20 kilometres (12 mi). It was the first Japanese set capable of deriving height estimates for aircraft.

==== Type 22 ====
Used for aircraft and ship detection up to 35 km and 34.5 km, respectively. Introduced in August 1943. It was also capable of gunnery control and became the most widely installed Japanese naval set.

== Gallery ==
Destroyers

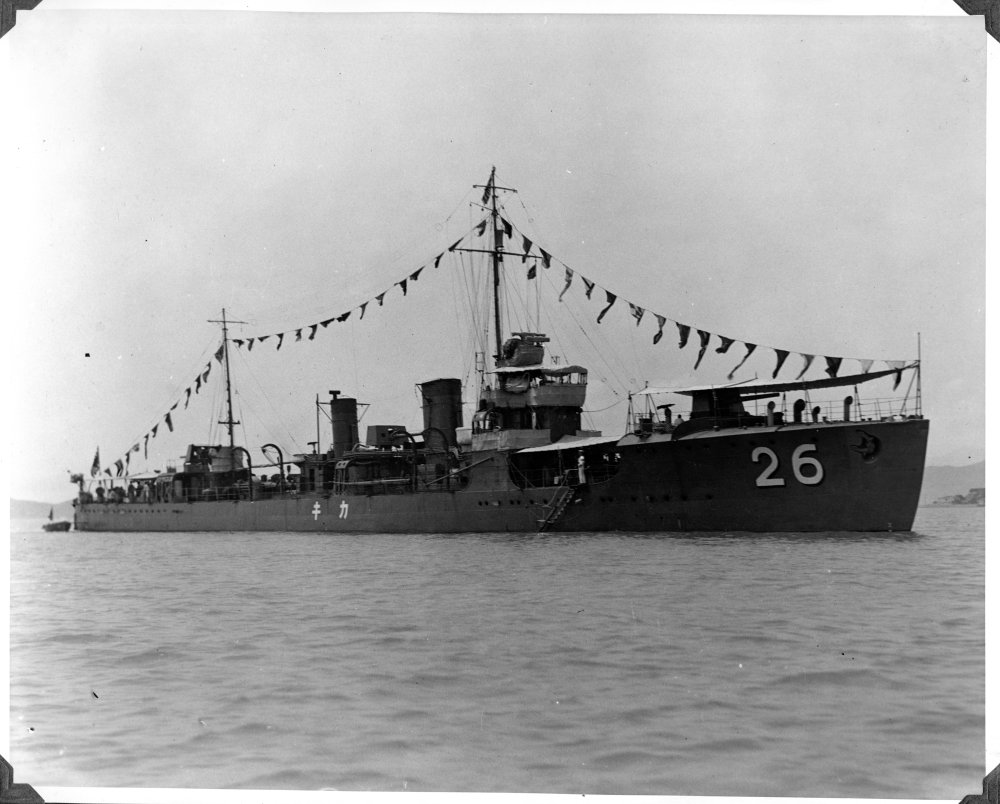
Momi class (樅型駆逐艦)

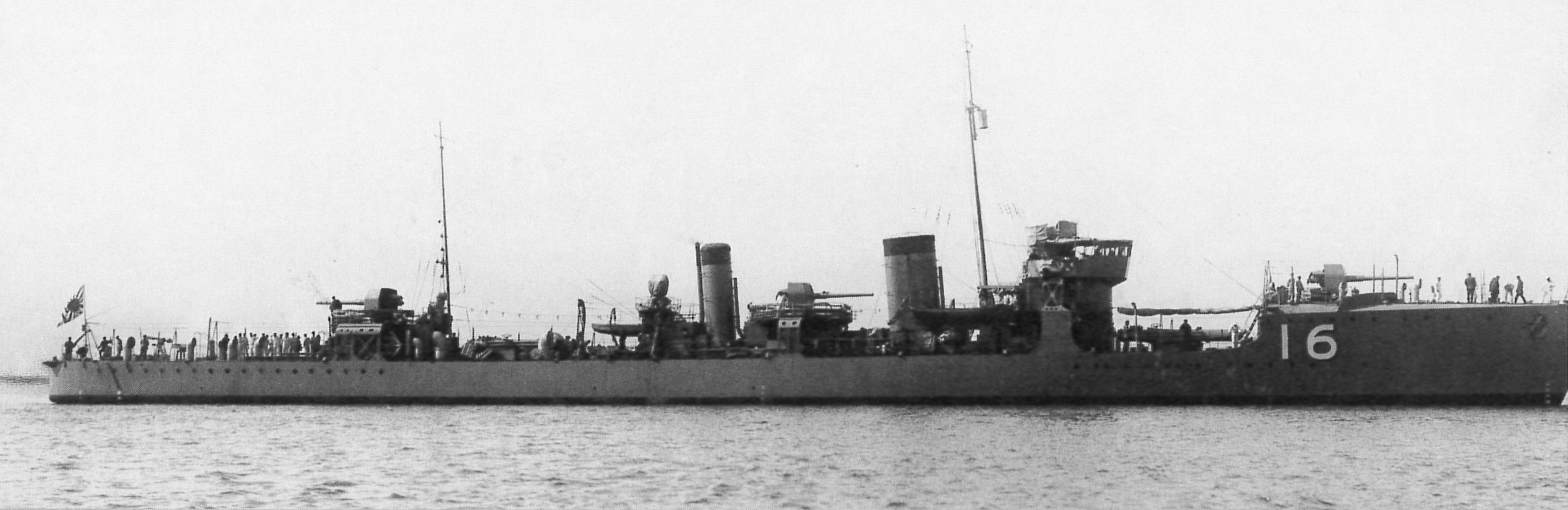
Wakatake class (若竹型駆逐艦)

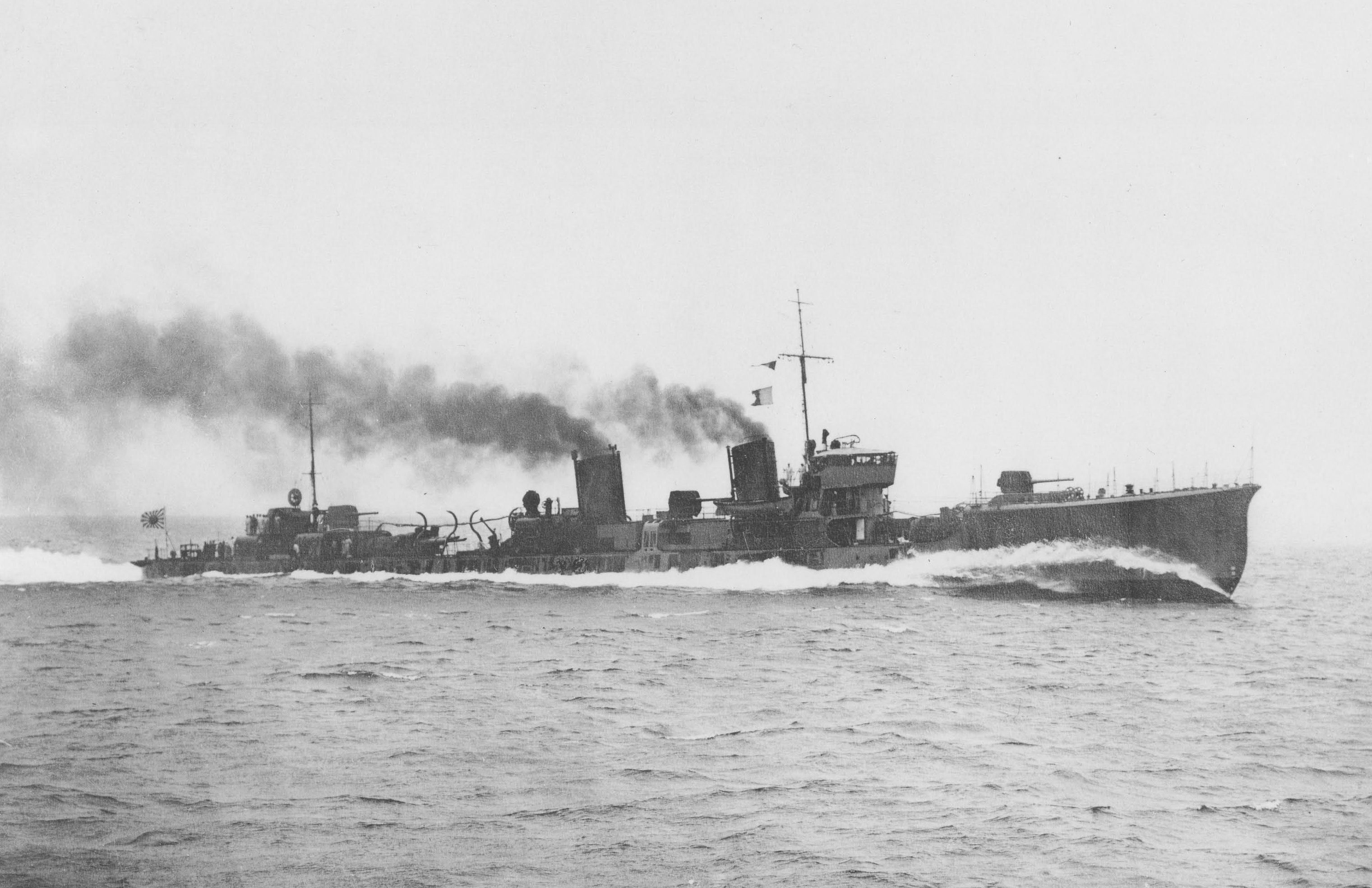
Mutsuki class (睦月型駆逐艦)

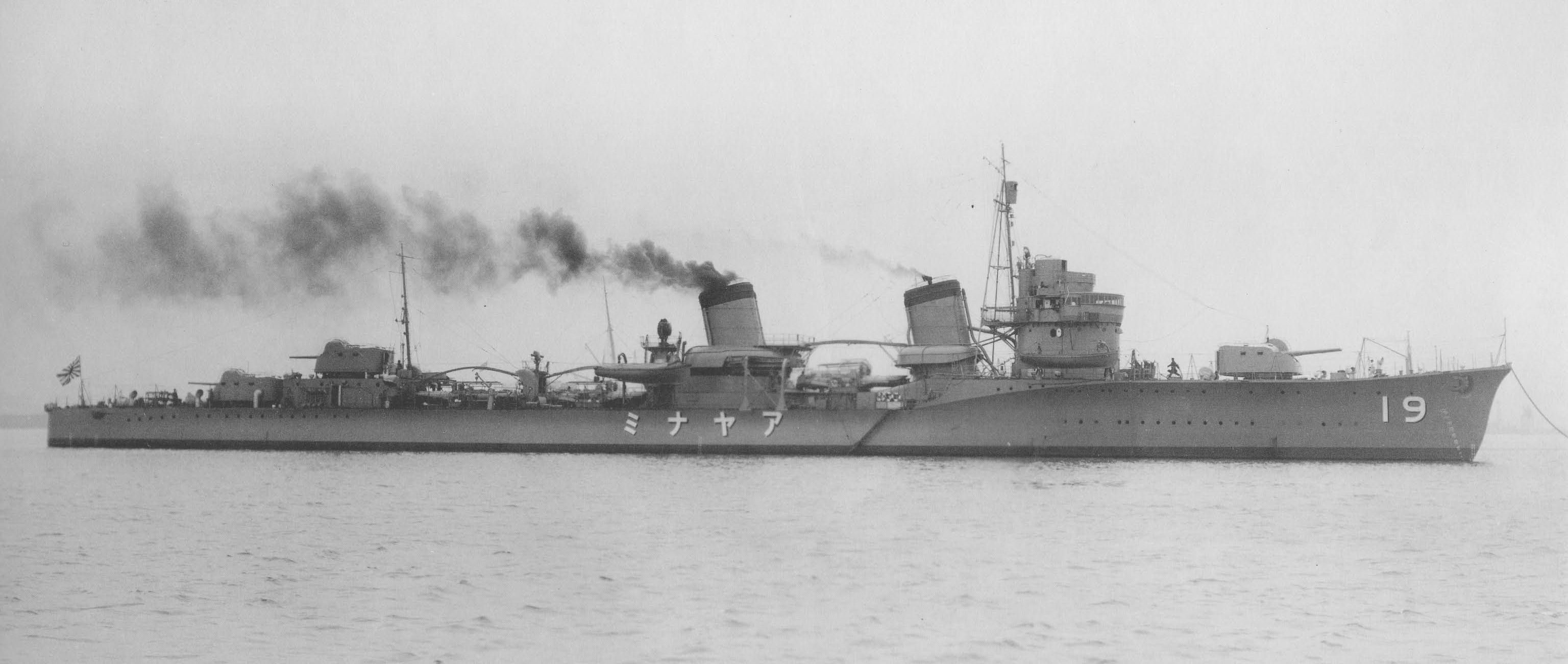
Second group Fubuki class or Ayanami class(綾波型駆逐艦)

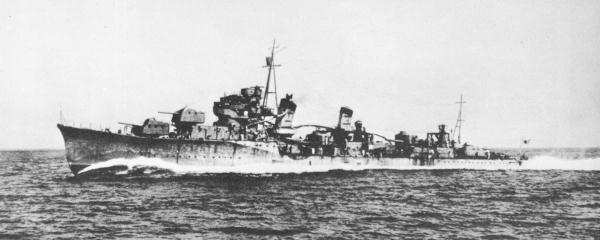
Hatsuharu class (初春型駆逐艦)

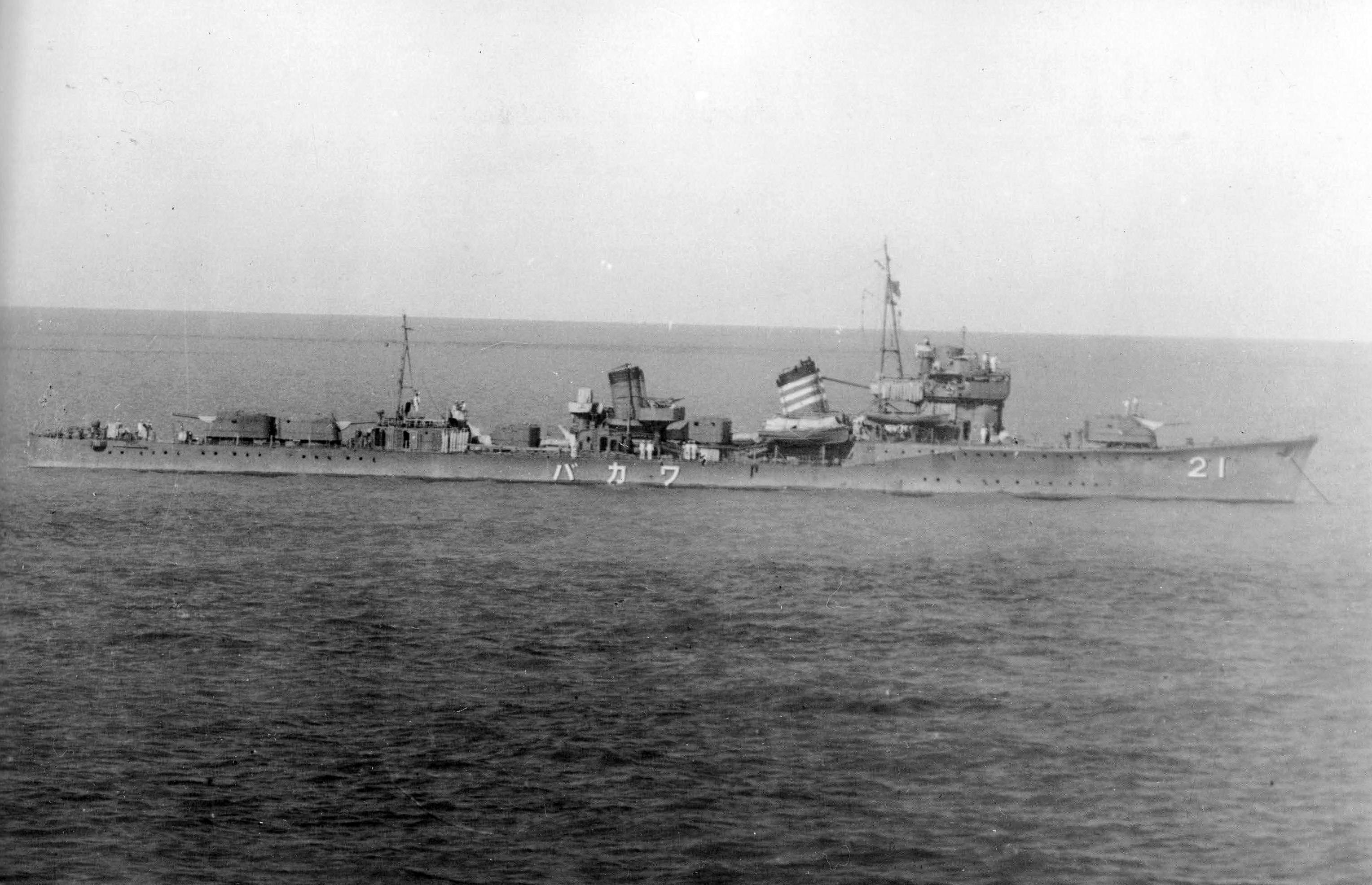
Hatsuharu class (初春型駆逐艦)

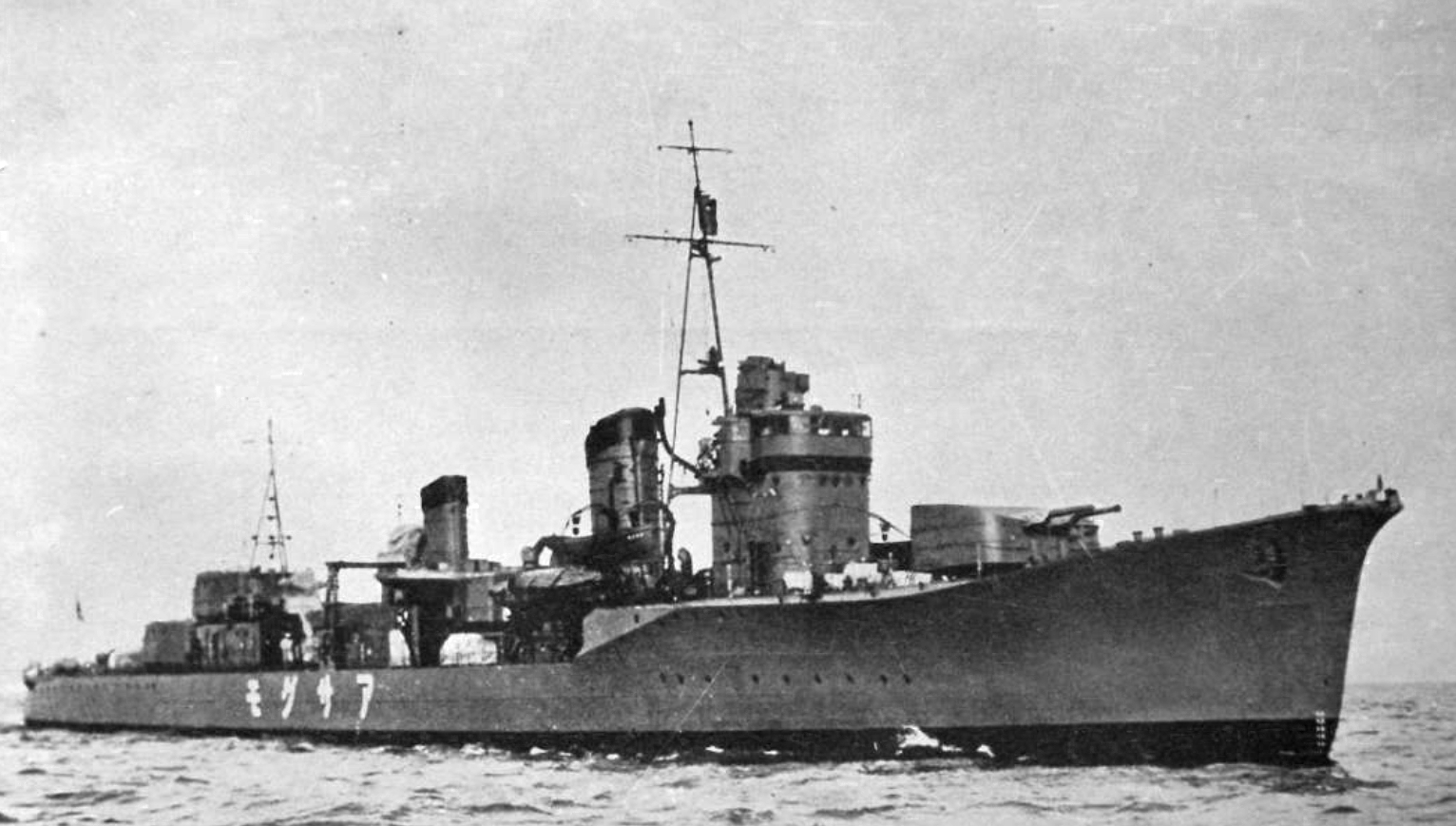
Asashio class (朝潮型駆逐艦)

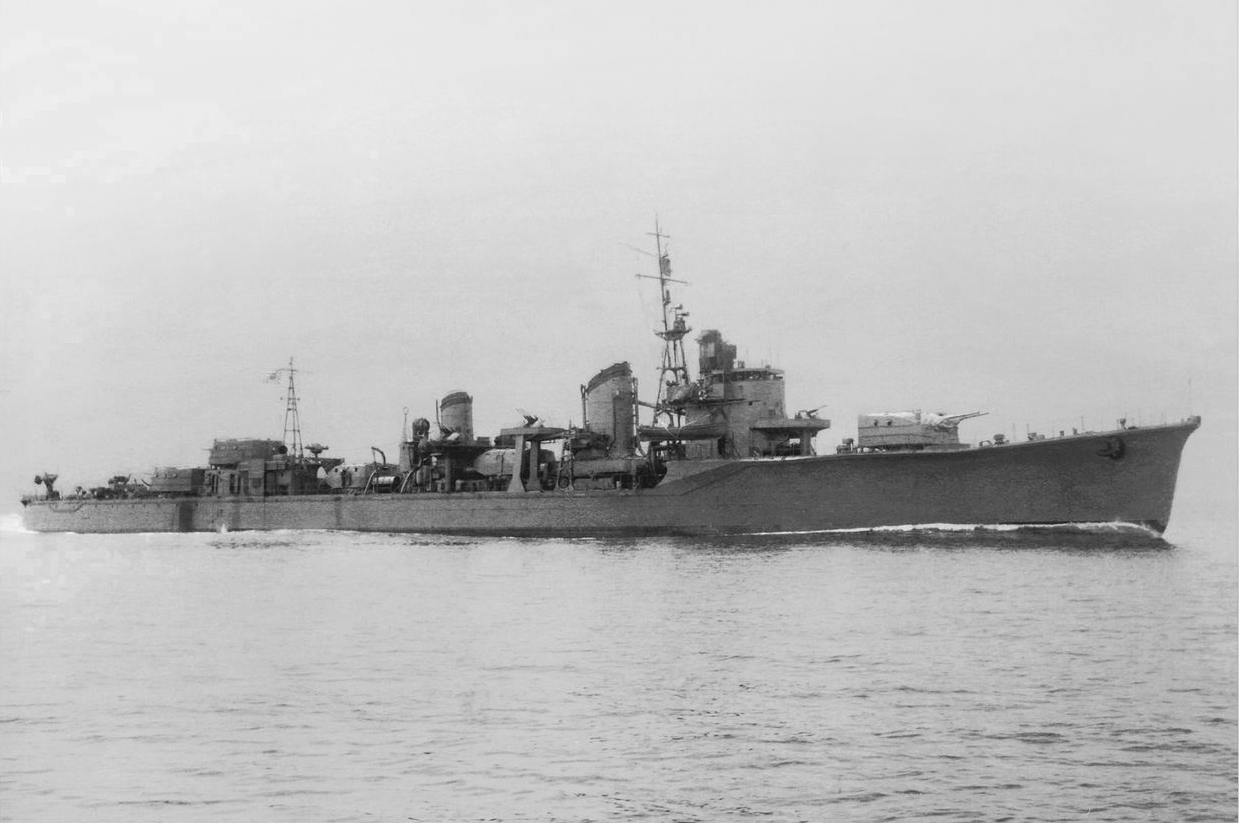
Yūgumo class (夕雲型駆逐艦)

Ocean Defence Ships

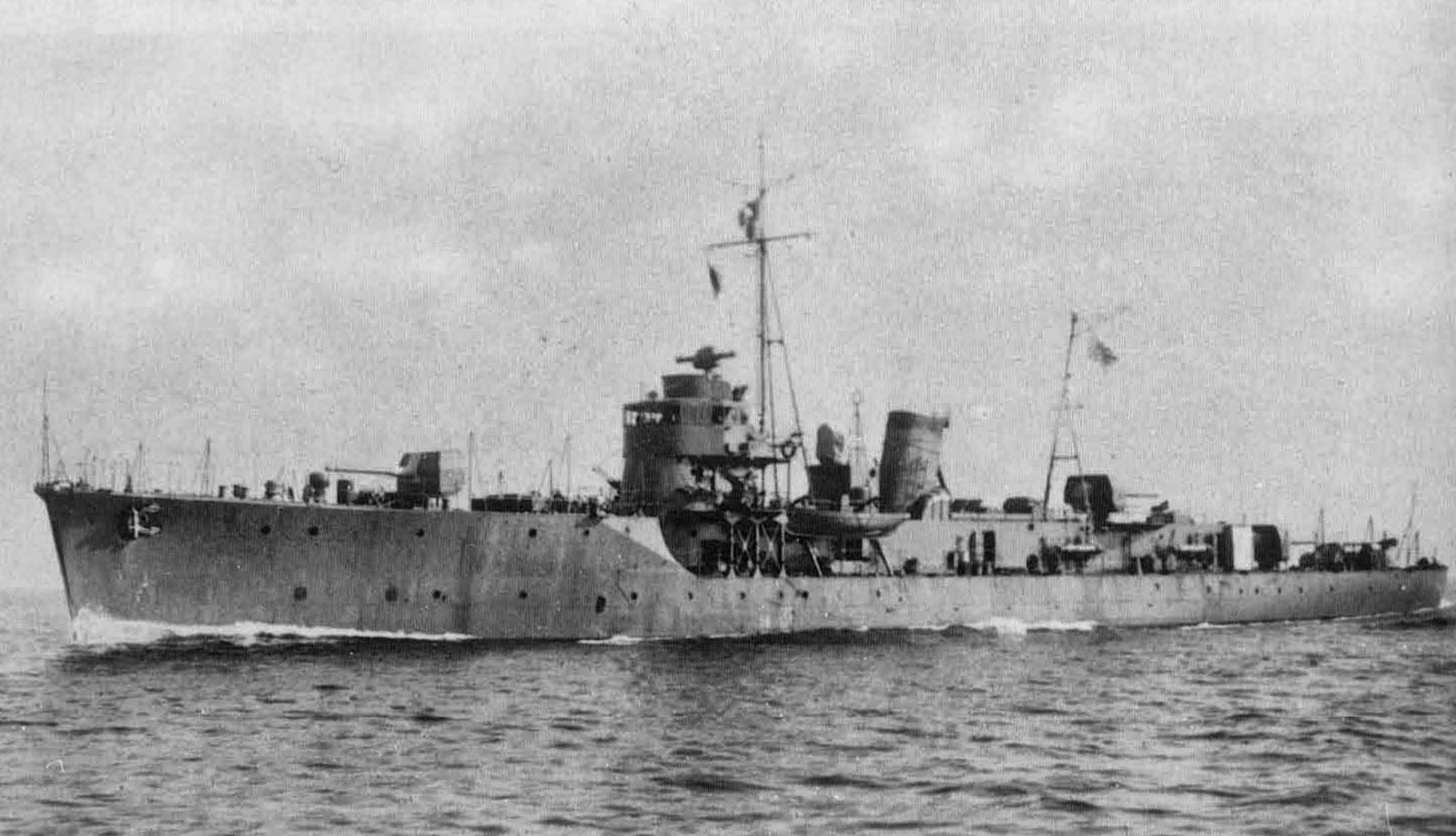
Etorofu class (択捉型海防艦)

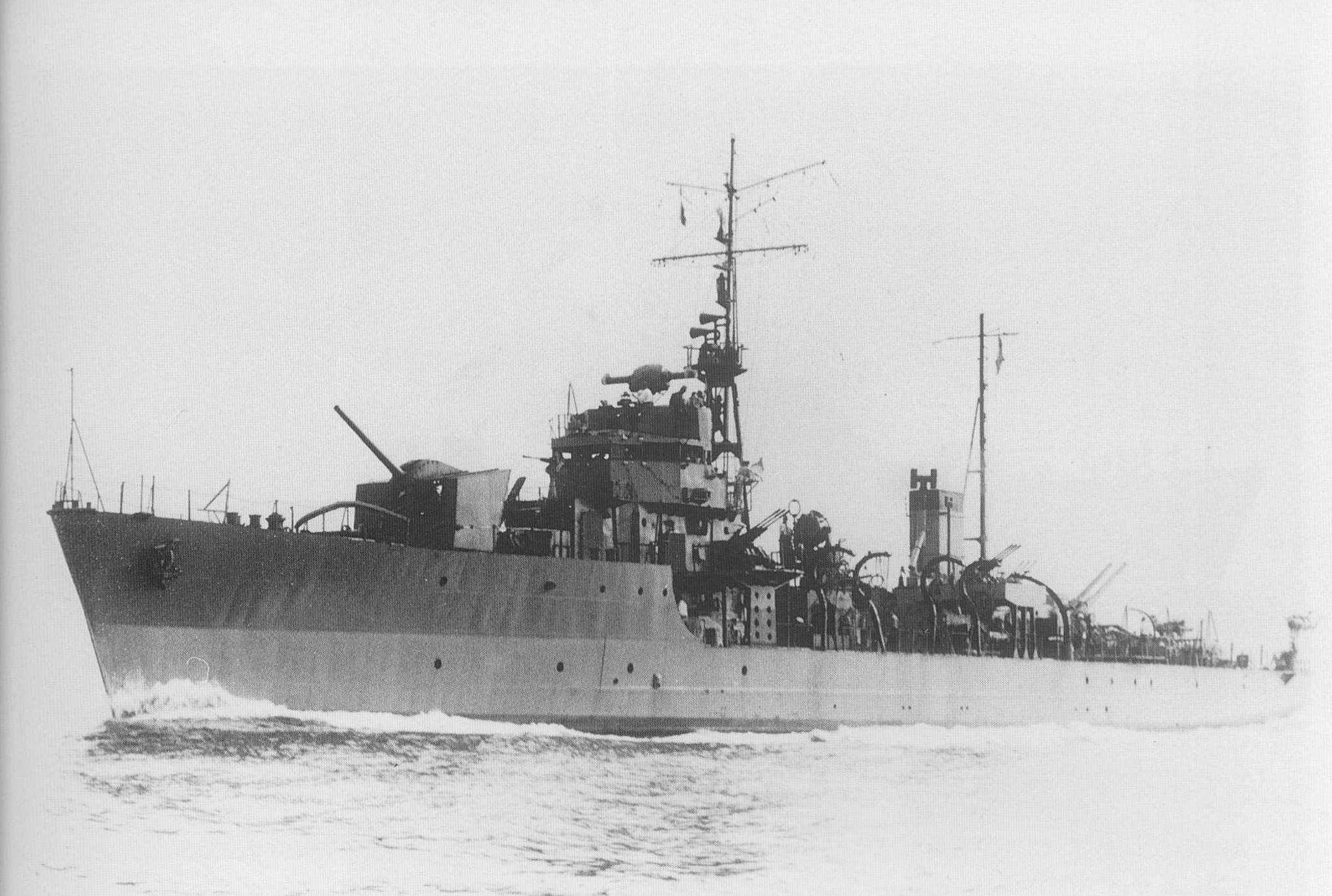
Hiburi class (日振海防艦)

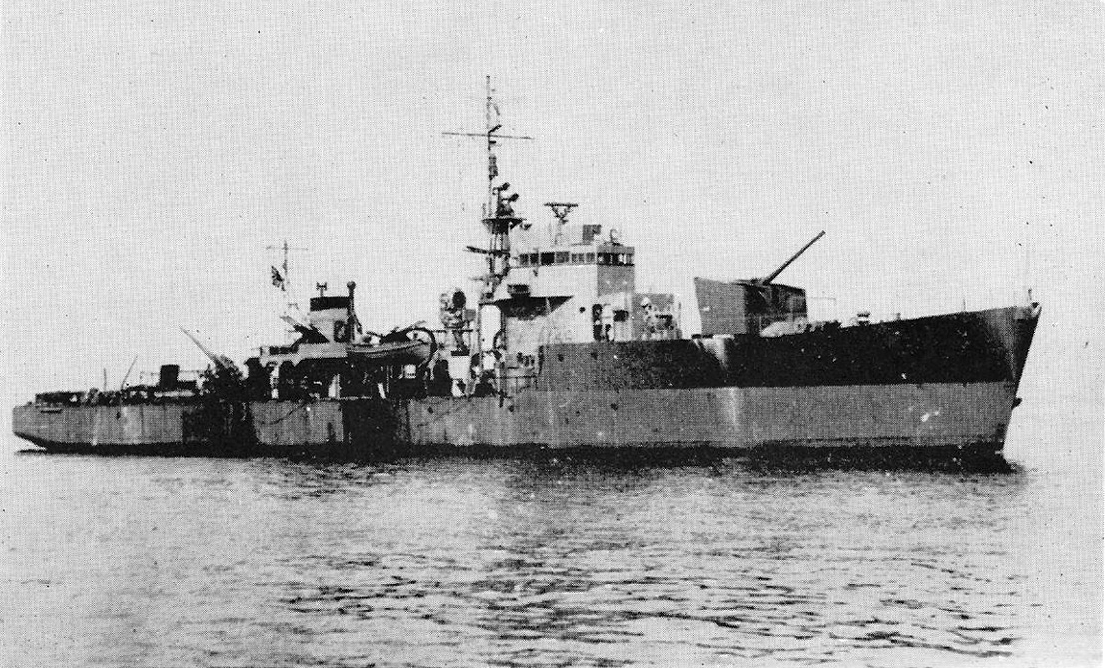
Type C (丙型海防艦)

Torpedo boats

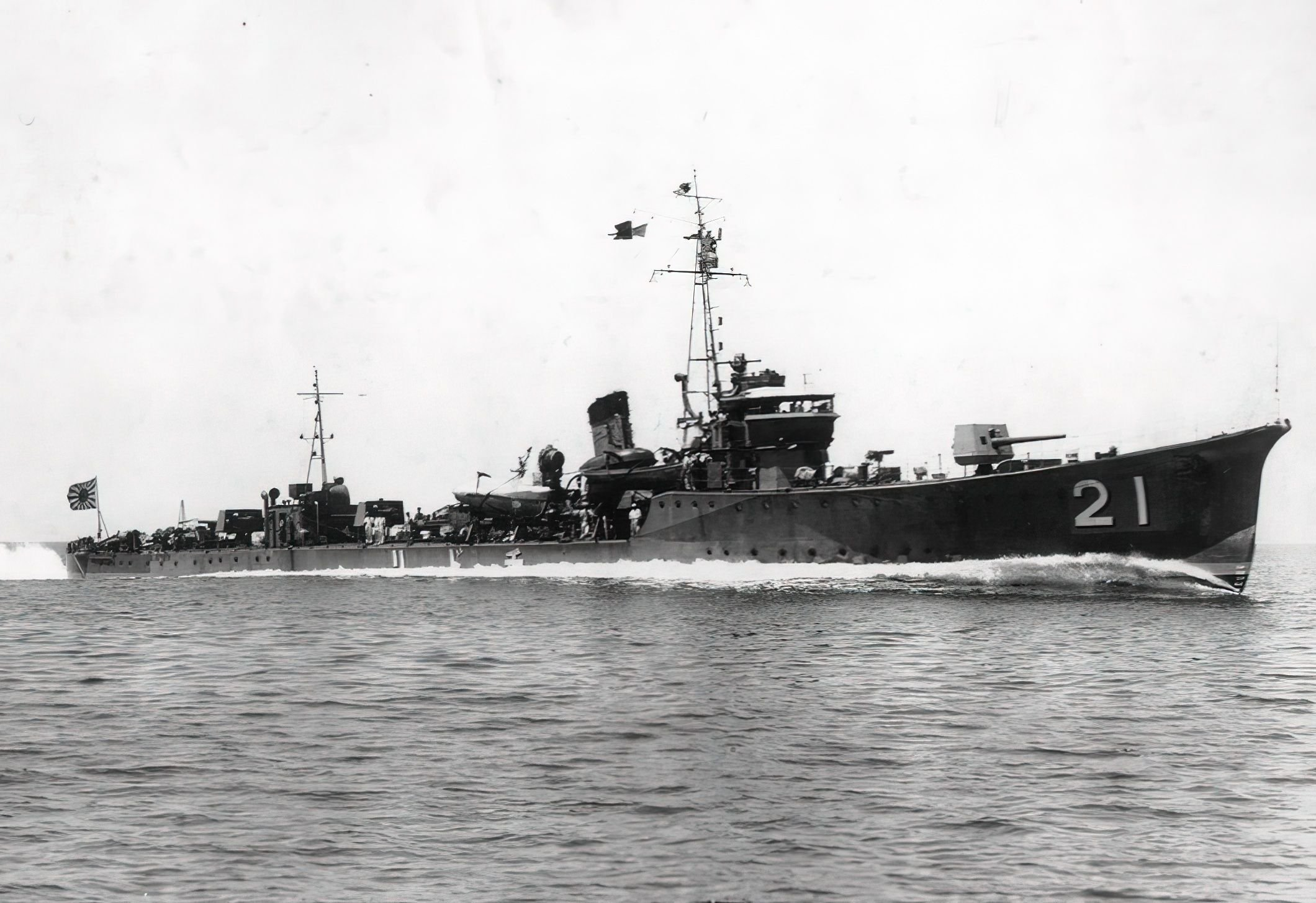
Chidori class (千鳥型水雷艇)

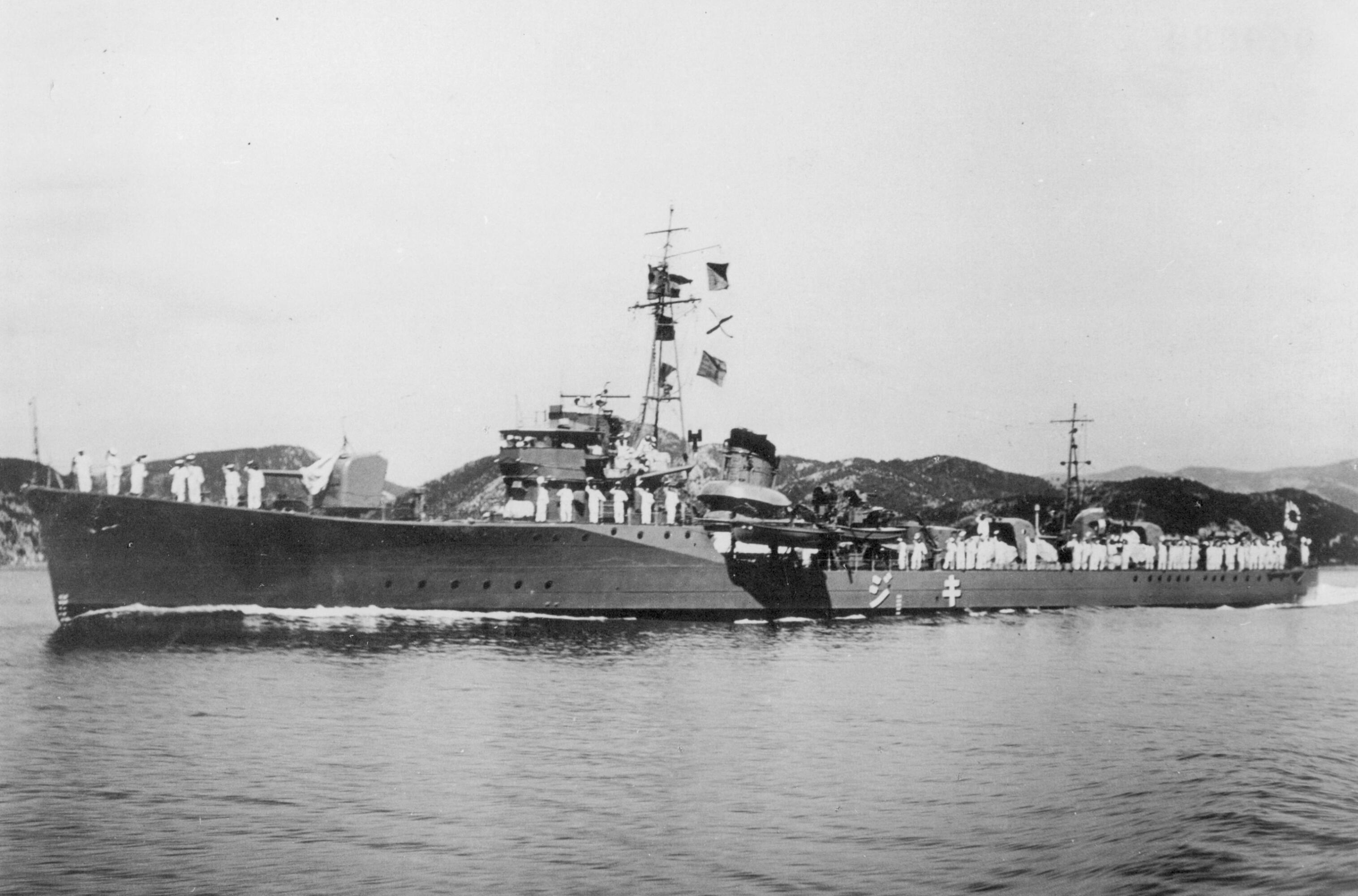
Ōtori class (鴻型水雷艇)
