= USS Cushing (DD-376) =

Mahan-class destroyer

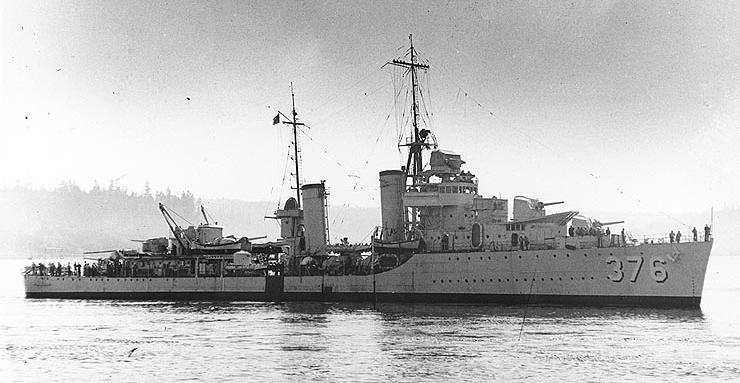
- Cushing off the Puget Sound Navy Yard during her pre-commissioning trials period in July 1936.

History

United States
- Name: Cushing
- Namesake: William Barker Cushing
- Builder: Puget Sound Navy Yard
- Laid down: 15 August 1934
- Launched: 31 December 1935
- Commissioned: 28 August 1936
- Identification: DD-376
- Fate: Sunk during Naval Battle of Guadalcanal on 13 November 1942.

General characteristics
- Class & type: Mahan-class destroyer
- Displacement: 1,500 tons
- Length: 341 ft 4 in (104.0 m)
- Beam: 35 ft 0 in (10.7 m)
- Draft: 9 ft 10 in (3.0 m)
- Speed: 37 knots (69 km/h; 43 mph)
- Complement: 158
- Armament: 5 × 5 in (127 mm) guns; 12 × 21 in (533 mm) torpedo tubes

USS Cushing (DD-376) was a Mahan-class destroyer in the United States Navy before and during World War II. She was the third Navy ship named for Commander William Barker Cushing (1842–1874).

== History ==
Cushing was launched on 31 December 1935 at the Puget Sound Navy Yard and sponsored by Miss. K. A. Cushing, daughter of Commander Cushing. The ship was commissioned on 28 August 1936 and reported to the Pacific Fleet.

Cushing joined the search in the Hawaiian Islands and at Howland Island, for the missing aviator Amelia Earhart from 4 to 30 July 1937, then returned to San Diego, California for training exercises, tactics, and fleet problems. Except for brief periods of training at Pearl Harbor and one cruise to the Caribbean, she cruised the west coast from San Diego for exercises and training.

== World War II ==
Undergoing overhaul at Mare Island Navy Yard when the Japanese struck Pearl Harbor, Cushing sailed from San Francisco, California 17 December 1941 for convoy escort duty between the West Coast and Pearl Harbor until 13 January 1942. She sailed to Midway to serve on antisubmarine patrol from 18 January to 2 February, then returned to San Francisco 19 February to screen TF 1 off the California coast in training and patrol duty.

On 1 August 1942, Cushing departed San Francisco for training exercises at Pearl Harbor, then to join the operations around Guadalcanal. Constantly on the move, she escorted vital resupply convoys to the bitterly contested island, and fought in the Battle of Santa Cruz of 26 October, when an outnumbered American force turned a Japanese flotilla back from their advance toward Guadalcanal.

== Fate ==
Cushing screened transports safely into Guadalcanal on 12 November 1942, and was in the van of the force that moved out to intercept the Japanese fleet in the Naval Battle of Guadalcanal on the night of 13 November 1942. As the range closed, she suddenly sighted the light cruiser Nagara and the destroyer Yukikaze at 3,000 yards (2,700 m). In the bitter gunfire which followed Cushing received several hits amidships, resulting in a gradual power loss, but she determinedly continued to fire her guns at the enemy, launching her torpedoes by local direction at an enemy battleship. Fires, exploding ammunition, and her inability to shoot any longer made the "abandon ship" order unavoidable at 0230. Her burning hulk was last seen from Guadalcanal at 1700 when she sank about 3,500 yards (3,200 m) southeast of Savo Island. Cushing lost about 70 men killed or missing; some men were rescued from the water, and many were wounded. Despite the loss, along with the task force, she had aided in saving Guadalcanal's Henderson Field from bombardment by the Japanese forces. Her wreck rests at the bottom of the waters around Savo Island, in an area off Guadalcanal known as Ironbottom Sound.

== Awards ==
Cushing received three battle stars for World War II service.
