= Ukuru-class escort ship =

1943 class of Japanese escort ships

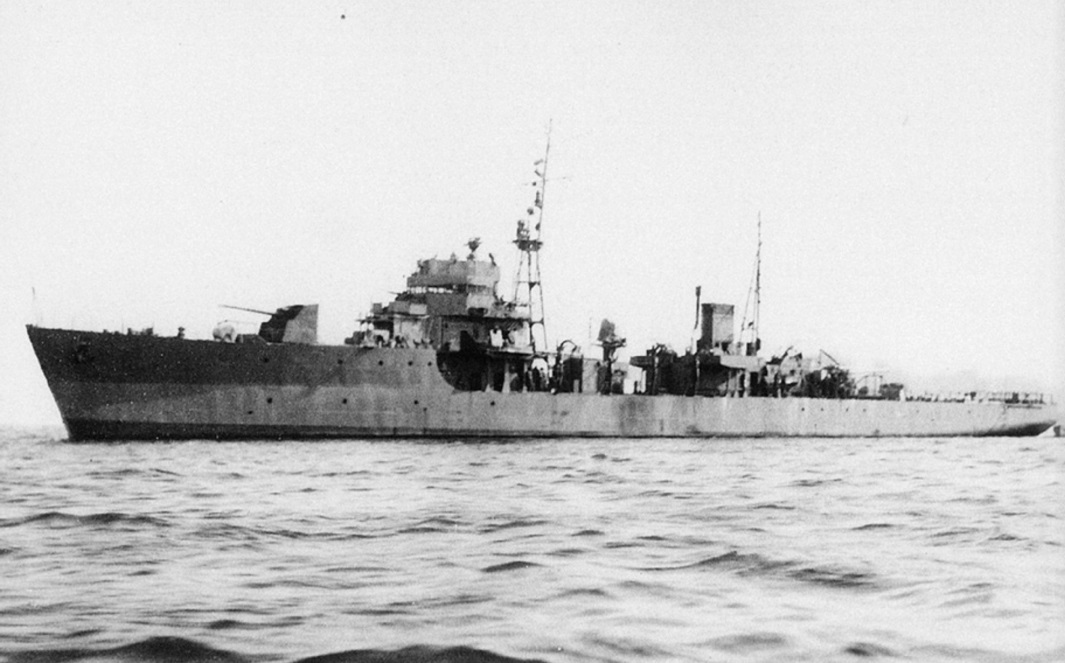
- Uku in 1944

Class overview
- Name: Ukuru class
- Builders: Hitachi Zōsen (7); Uraga Dock Company (7); Mitsui Shipbuilding & Eng. (5); Nihon Kōkan (4); Sasebo Naval Arsenal (3); Maizuru Naval Arsenal (1)
- Operators: Imperial Japanese Navy; Japan Ministry of Transport; Japan Coast Guard; Republic of China Navy; People's Liberation Army Navy; Soviet Navy
- Preceded by: Mikura class
- Succeeded by: Type C; Type D
- Subclasses: Hiburi class
- Built: 1942–1944
- In commission: 1943–1964
- Planned: 142
- Completed: 29
- Canceled: 2
- Lost: 10

General characteristics
- Type: Escort vessel
- Displacement: 940 long tons (955 t) standard
- Length: 77.7 m (255 ft)
- Beam: 9.1 m (29 ft 10 in)
- Draught: 3.05 m (10 ft)
- Propulsion: 2 shaft, geared diesel engines, 4,400 hp (3,281 kW)
- Speed: 19.5 knots (22.4 mph; 36.1 km/h)
- Range: 5,000 nmi (9,300 km) at 16 kn (18 mph; 30 km/h)
- Complement: 150
- Sensors & processing systems: Type 22 and 13 radars; Type 93 and/or Type 3 sonar
- Armament: As built : 3 × 120 mm (4.7 in)/45 cal DP guns; 4 × Type 96 25 mm (0.98 in) AA machine guns (2×2); 2 × Type 94 depth charge projectors; 16 × Type 3 depth charge throwers; 2 × depth charge chutes; 120 × depth charges

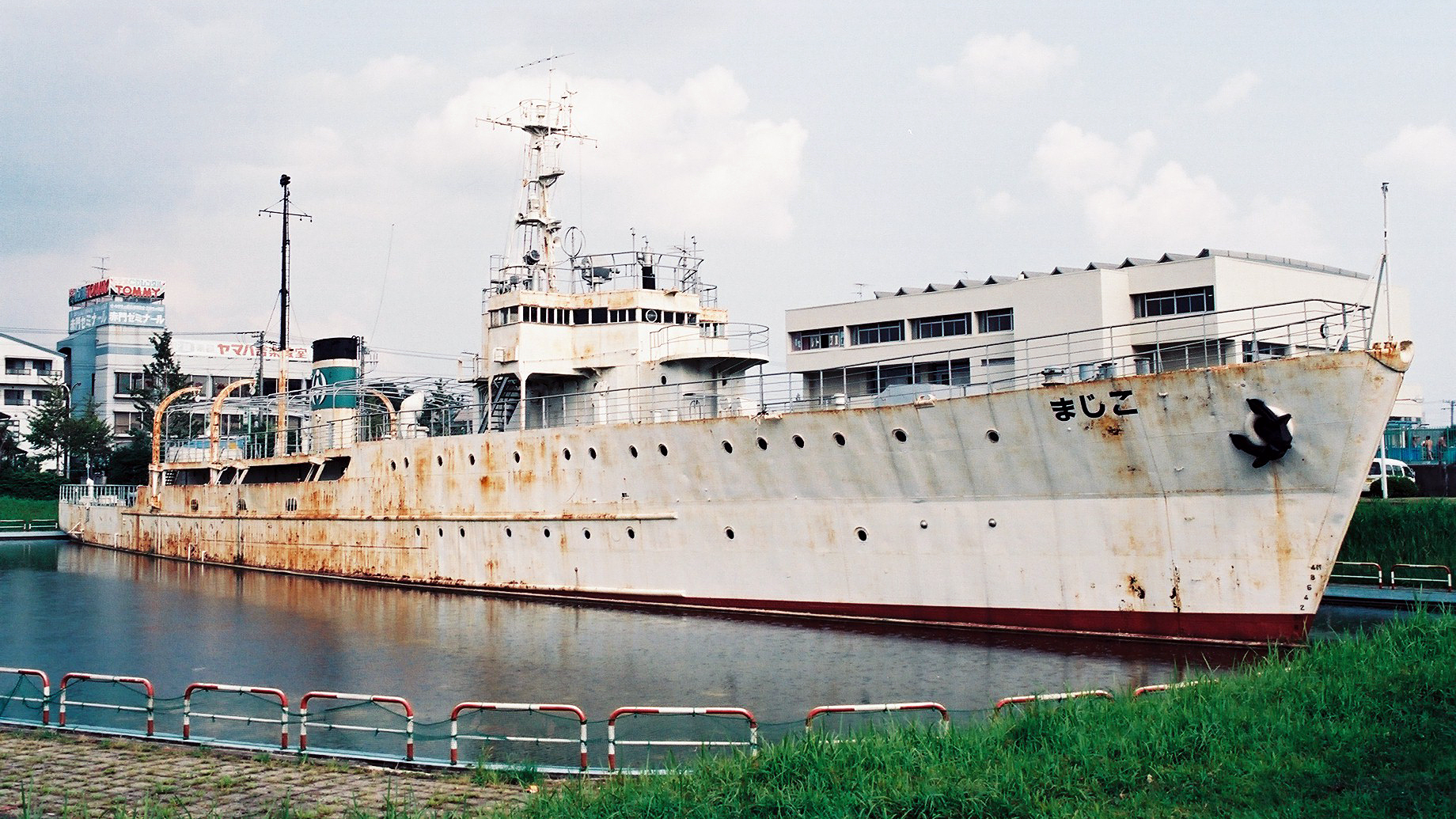
Shiga while she was preserved in Chiba City.

The Ukuru-class escort ships (鵜来型海防艦, Ukuru-gata kaibōkan) were a class of twenty kaibōkan escort vessels built for the Imperial Japanese Navy during World War II. The class was also referred to by internal Japanese documents as the "Modified B-class" coastal defense vessel (改乙型海防艦, Kai-Otsu-gata kaibōkan), and they were the fourth class of kaibōkan.

== Background ==
The Mikura class escort ship was developed after the start of the Pacific War, it became apparent that a design more capable of anti-submarine warfare than the previous Shimushu and Etorofu class kaibōkan was needed. Despite being a simplified design, the Mikura-class vessels still took too long to construct, and due to the high attrition of Japan's destroyer and escort ships, action needed to be urgently taken to produce more ships in a quicker time. Furthermore, operational experience had shown that the Mikura-class was still very weak in its anti-aircraft capability.

The first five of the new Ukuru-class were authorized under the 1941 Rapid Naval Armaments Supplement Programme and an additional six in the 1942 Modified 5th Naval Armaments Supplement Programme and nine under the 1944 Wartime Naval Armaments Supplement Programme. Twenty vessels were commissioned; two more (Urumi and Murotsu) were launched by Uraga Dock and completed in August 1945 but were still uncommissioned by the war’s end. In addition to these, nine units and two additional unfinished ships belong to a sub-class called the Hiburi class and are included in the table below.

== Description ==
The Ukuru-class was a further simplification of the Mikura design. The hull was constructed using prefabricated sections which avoided the use of shaped steel or curved plates, which greatly reduced construction time. The curved plates on the bridge were also eliminated, and the smoke stacks were made of hexagonal elements instead of with a circular or oval cross-section. Internally, individual crew quarters were eliminated, becoming a communal area, and overall the construction was very spartan. These changes reduced construction time to under four months, although construction was often hindered by the lack of diesel engines.

The main battery was the same as on the Mikura-class, with three dual-purpose Type 10 120 mm AA guns one forward, and a twin mount aft, but the later ships in the class were fitted with modified gun shields. Anti-aircraft protection was by five triple-mount Type 96 25-millimeter (1.0 in) anti-aircraft guns with two abreast the bridge, one of each side of the smokestack, and one aft on the deck house, along with a single-mount in front of the bridge. Some units received additional single-mount Type 96s, which were located on the forecastle. The Ukuru-class was equipped with the Type 22 and Type 13 radar. The Ukuru class was initially armed with 120 depth charges with two Type 94 depth charge projectors, sixteen Type 3 depth charge throwers and two depth charge chutes at the stern. The ships were provided with a Model 93 sonar and a Type 93 hydrophone; later units received the Type 3 Model 2 sonar, and some would later receive an 8 cm (3 in) trench mortar.

Initially, the class retained capacity as a minesweeper, and was equipped with two paravanes; however, this was removed soon after completion.

== Operational service ==
Despite being easy to build, they proved quite durable, with 11 occurrences of the class striking mines and only 3 sinking, one of which was after the war. Ikuna survived being torpedoed by USS Crevalle and striking a mine as well.

The Ukuru vessels were used extensively on convoy escort assignment in the South China Sea and East China Sea, where they frequently were attacked by Allied submarines or aircraft. However, despite their durability, they proved to be relatively ineffective against Allied submarines. Okinawa was the most successful ship of the class, helping to sink two US submarines, USS Snook on April 14, 1945 with the kaibōkan CD-8, CD-32, and CD-52; and USS Bonefish on June 19, 1945 with kaibokan CD-63, CD-75, CD-158, and CD-207.

Surviving ships were used in the immediate postwar period as minesweepers and for repatriation. Five vessels survived to return to Japanese control, and were used as weather survey ships or as patrol ships, with the last being retired in 1966.

== Ships ==
| Number | Kanji | Name | Builder | Laid down | Launched | Completed | Fate |
|---|---|---|---|---|---|---|---|
| #332 | 鵜来 | Ukuru | Nihon Kōkan, Tsurumi | 9 October 1943 | 15 May 1944 | 31 July 1944 | Ukuru survived the war and later became a weather survey ship in the Japanese Maritime Transport Bureau before being sold for scrapping on 24 November 1965. |
| #335 | 沖縄 | Okinawa | Nihon Kokan, Tsurumi | 10 December 1943 | 19 June 1944 | 16 August 1944 | Okinawa was damaged by a bomb in an air attack by P-38s while escorting TA no. 2 on 5 November 1944 and damaged by PT boats on 9 November and by aircraft again on 18 November 1944. Okinawa was sunk on 30 July 1945 by aircraft from HMS Formidable. |
| #336 | 奄美 | Amami | Nihon Kokan, Tsurumi | 14 February 1944 | 30 November 1944 | 8 April 1945 | Amami survived the war and was ceded to the UK as a war reparation and scrapped on 20 December 1947. |
| #337 | 粟国 | Aguni | Nihon Kokan, Tsurumi | 15 February 1944 | 21 September 1944 | 2 December 1944 | On 27 May 1945, Aguni was damaged by a Bat glide bomb. The bomb's 1,000 lb (450 kg) warhead exploded off Aguni's starboard bow demolishing the whole foredeck area ahead of the bridge and killing 33 sailors. After being hit, Aguni's crew had to cut her anchor chain to free her. Kaibokan CD-12 was dispatched to assist Okinawa in rescuing Aguni’s crew, but despite the heavy damage the kaibokan remained navigable and proceeded stern first to Pusan, Korea on her own power. Aguni survived the war and was sold for scrapping on 20 May 1948. |
| #338 | 新南 | Shinnan | Uraga Dock Company | 30 June 1944 | 4 September 1944 | 21 October 1944 | Shinnan survived the war and later became a weather survey ship in the Japanese Maritime Transport Bureau before being sent to the petrol development agency in October 1967. She was scrapped in 1975. |
| #339 | 昭南 | Shōnan | Hitachi Zōsen, Sakurajima | 23 February 1944 | 19 May 1944 | 13 July 1944 | Torpedoed and sunk by USS Hoe on 25 February 1945, with 198 crew and passengers killed. |
| #4701 | 稲木 | Inagi | Mitsui Shipbuilding & Eng., Tamano | 15 May 1944 | 25 September 1944 | 16 December 1944 | Inagi was bombed and sunk by planes from HMS Formidable on 9 August 1945, with the loss of 29 killed and 35 wounded. |
| #4702 | 羽節 | Habushi | Mitsui Shipbuilding & Eng., Tamano | 20 August 1944 | 20 November 1944 | 10 January 1945 | Habushi struck a mine on 8 April 1945 and was damaged. She survived the war and was ceded to the United States as a war reparation and scrapped starting 17 October 1947. |
| #4703 | 男鹿 | Ojika | Mitsui Shipbuilding & Eng., Tamano | 7 September 1944 | 30 December 1944 | 21 February 1945 | Ojika was torpedoed and sunk by USS Springer on 2 June 1945. |
| #4704 | 金輪 | Kanawa | Mitsui Shipbuilding & Eng., Tamano | 15 November 1944 | 20 January 1945 | 25 March 1945 | Kanawa survived the war and was ceded to the UK as a war reparation and scrapped on 14 August 1947. |
| #4705 | 宇久 | Uku | Sasebo Naval Arsenal | 1 August 1944 | 12 November 1944 | 30 December 1944 | Uku struck a mine on 9 April 1945 and was damaged. She survived the war and was ceded to the United States as a war reparation and later scrapped. |
| #4707 | 高根 | Takane | Mitsui Shipbuilding & Eng., Tamano | 15 December 1944 | 13 February 1945 | 26 April 1945 | Takane survived the war and was scrapped starting 27 November 1947. |
| #4709 | 久賀 | Kuga | Sasebo Navy Yard | 1 August 1944 | 19 November 1944 | 25 January 1945 | Kuga struck a mine on 25 June 1945 and was damaged. She survived the war and was scrapped on 30 June 1947. |
| #4711 | 志賀 | Shiga | Sasebo Naval Arsenal | 25 November 1944 | 9 February 1945 | 20 March 1945 | Shiga survived the war and later became a weather survey ship in the Japanese Maritime Transport Bureau before being discarded on May 6, 1964. Her hull became the pavilion for Maritime Amusement Park in Chiba City, but her hull deteriorated because of poor maintenance and was dismantled and scrapped in 1998. |
| #4712 | 伊王 | Iwō | Maizuru Naval Arsenal | 25 November 1944 | 12 February 1945 | 24 March 1945 | Iwo struck a mine on 13 June 1945 and was damaged. She was damaged lightly in an air attack by planes from USS Shangri-La, losing 4 killed and 61 wounded. She survived the war and was scrapped starting 2 July 1948. |
| #5251 | 屋久 | Yaku | Uraga Dock Company | 30 June 1944 | 4 September 1944 | 23 October 1944 | Torpedoed and sunk by USS Hammerhead on 23 February 1945, with the loss of 132 men. |
| #5252 | 久米 | Kume | Hitachi Zōsen, Sakurajima | 26 May 1944 | 15 August 1944 | 25 September 1944 | Torpedoed and sunk by USS Spadefish on 28 January 1945, with the loss of 89 men. |
| #5253 | 竹生 | Chikubu | Uraga Dock Company | 8 September 1944 | 12 November 1944 | 31 December 1944 | Chikubu survived the war and later became a weather survey ship in the Japanese Maritime Transport Bureau before being sold for scrapping on 4 October 1962. |
| #5254 | 生名 | Ikuna | Hitachi Zōsen, Sakurajima | 30 June 1944 | 4 September 1944 | 15 October 1944 | Ikuna was hit by a torpedo by USS Crevalle and damaged on 10 April 1945. On 1 August she struck a mine and was damaged. Ikuna survived the war and later became a weather survey ship in the Japanese Maritime Transport Bureau before being sold for scrapping on 25 May 1963. |
| #5255 | 神津 | Kōzu | Uraga Dock Company | 20 October 1944 | 31 December 1944 | 7 February 1945 | She survived the war and was ceded to the Soviet Union as a war reparation on 28 August 1947. Served in Soviet Pacific Ocean Fleet as patrol ship EK-47 (1947), oceanographic research ship Nord (1948), later - Glubomer (1953), repair ship PM-62 (1955). Decommissioned on 25 January 1969 and scrapped. |
| #5256 | 保高 | Hodaka | Uraga Dock Company | 27 November 1944 | 28 January 1945 | 30 March 1945 | She survived the war and was ceded to the United States as a war reparation and scrapped starting 1 March 1948. |
| #5257 | 四阪 | Shisaka | Hitachi Zōsen, Sakurajima | 21 August 1944 | 31 October 1944 | 15 December 1944 | She survived the war and was ceded to the Republic of China Navy as a war reparation and renamed as Huai An (惠安), but later was captured by the Chinese communists at the end of Chinese Civil War, and entered PLAN under the same name. The ship was later renamed as Rui Jin (瑞金) and served as a training ship in PLAN until the early 1980s before it as finally scrapped. |
| #5258 | 伊唐 | Ikara | Uraga Dock Company | 26 December 1944 | 22 February 1945 | 30 April 1945 | On 9 August 1945, Ikara struck a mine and sank. |
| #5259 | 崎戸 | Sakito | Hitachi Zōsen, Sakurajima | 7 September 1944 | 29 November 1944 | 10 January 1945 | On 27 June 1945, Sakito struck a mine and was damaged. Sakito survived the war and was scrapped on 1 December 1947. |
| #5260 | 生野 | Ikuno | Uraga Dock Company | 3 January 1945 | 11 March 1945 | 17 July 1945 | She survived the war and was ceded to the Soviet Union as a war reparation on 29 July 1947. Served in Soviet Pacific Ocean Fleet as patrol ship EK-41 (1947), target ship TsL-41 (1948), oceanographic research ship Val (1949). Decommissioned on 1 June 1961 and scrapped. |
| #5263 | 目斗 | Mokuto | Hitachi Zōsen, Sakurajima | 5 November 1944 | 7 January 1945 | 19 February 1945 | On 4 April 1945, Mokuto struck a mine and sank. |
| #5264 | 波太 | Habuto | Hitachi Zōsen, Sakurajima | 3 December 1944 | 28 February 1945 | 7 April 1945 | Habuto struck a mine on 6 June 1945 and was damaged. She struck a second mine on 10 June 1945 and was again damaged. She survived the war and was ceded to the UK as a war reparation and scrapped on 16 July 1947. |

Twelve other ships were cancelled in 1945 - numbers #4706, #4708, #4710, #4713 to #4721. These included Murotsu and Urumi (both launched but incomplete); also cancelled (unstarted) were #5261, #5262, #5267 to #5284 (all of the Yaku group) from the Modified 5th Naval Armaments Supplement Programme. Also cancelled incomplete were two of the Hiburi class - numbers #5265 (Ōtsu) and #5266 (Tomoshiri).

== See also ==
- Shimushu-class escort ship
- Etorofu-class escort ship
- Hiburi-class escort ship
- Type C escort ship
- Type D escort ship
- Destroyer escort
- Tacoma-class frigate
- Flower-class corvette
