= Japanese destroyer Yukikaze (1939) =

Kagerō-class destroyer

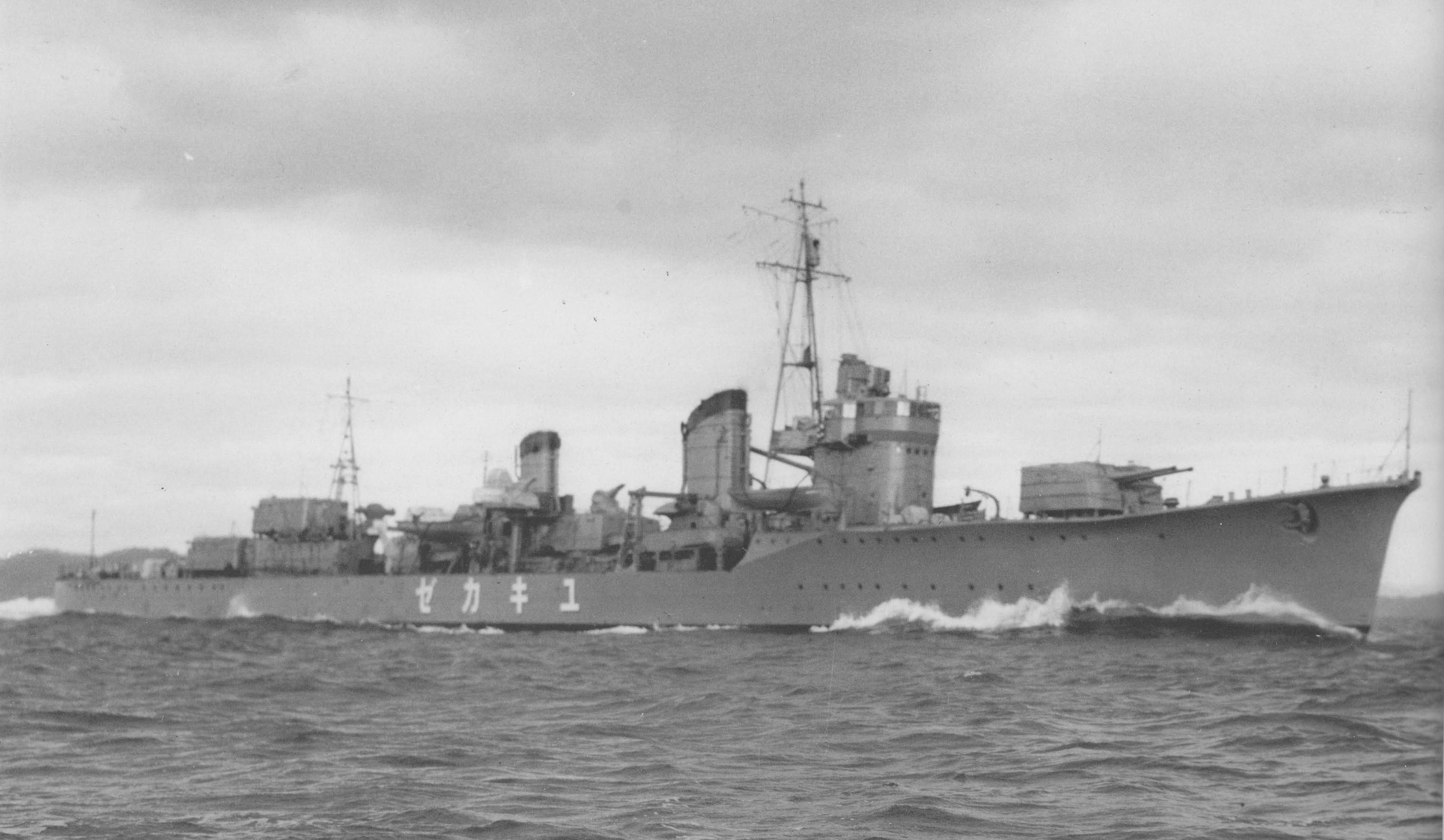
- Yukikaze on sea trials, December 1939

History

Empire of Japan
- Name: Yukikaze
- Builder: Sasebo Naval Arsenal
- Launched: 24 March 1939
- Commissioned: 20 January 1940
- Stricken: 5 October 1945
- Fate: Transferred to the Republic of China Navy, 6 July 1947

Republic of China
- Name: ROCS Dan Yang (丹陽)
- Namesake: Danyang
- Acquired: 6 July 1947
- Commissioned: 1 May 1948
- Decommissioned: 16 November 1966
- Identification: Hull number: DD-12
- Fate: Scrapped, 1970

General characteristics
- Class & type: Kagerō-class destroyer
- Displacement: 2,490 long tons (2,530 t)
- Length: 118.5 m (388 ft 9 in)
- Beam: 10.8 m (35 ft 5 in)
- Draft: 3.8 m (12 ft 6 in)
- Speed: 35.5 knots (40.9 mph; 65.7 km/h)
- Complement: 240
- Armament: 6 × 12.7 cm/50 Type 3 DP guns; up to 28 × 25mm Type 96 AA guns; up to 4 × 13.2 mm (0.52 in) AA guns; 8 × 610 mm (24 in) Type 93 torpedoes (in 2 × 4 tube rotating midship launchers + reloads); 36 depth charges

Yukikaze (雪風; "Snowy Wind") was a Kagerō-class destroyer in service with the Imperial Japanese Navy during World War II. She was the only member of her class to survive the war, and did so without suffering any major damage. She participated in the battles of the Java Sea, Midway, and Santa Cruz, and saw her first major surface action at the Naval Battle of Guadalcanal, sinking the destroyer USS Laffey and helping to sink the destroyer USS Cushing, alongside crippling the destroyer USS Sterett and lightly damaging the destroyer USS O'Bannon. She survived the devastating naval defeat that was the Battle of the Bismarck Sea undamaged, and led a Japanese counterattack at the Battle of Kolombangara, where she likely directly torpedoed the light cruiser HMNZS Leander and took part in a mass torpedo spread that sank the destroyer USS Gwin and torpedoed the light cruisers USS Honolulu and USS Saint Louis.

Yukikaze undertook escort missions during the Battle of the Philippine Sea, and later took part in the Battle of Leyte Gulf, surviving the allied attacks that sank dozens of Japanese ships and engaging the escort carriers and destroyers of Taffy 3, firing torpedoes at US escort carriers without obtaining a hit before helping to sink the destroyer USS Johnston. Yukikaze saw her last major action escorting and witnessing the sinking of the battleship Yamato during the Battle of Okinawa, before surviving the war, being the only ship of her class to do so.

Following the war, the ship was transferred to the Republic of China Navy, where she was renamed Dan Yang (丹陽 DD-12) and served until 1966, taking part in two shore bombardment missions and capturing two oil tankers and a cargo ship, before being scrapped in 1970.

== Design and description ==
The Kagerō class was an enlarged and improved version of the preceding Asashio class of destroyers. Their crew numbered 240 officers and enlisted men. The ships measured 118.5 meters (388 ft 9 in) overall, with a beam of 10.8 meters (35 ft 5 in) and a draft of 3.76 meters (12 ft 4 in). They displaced 2,065 metric tons (2,032 long tons) at standard load and 2,529 metric tons (2,489 long tons) at deep load. The ships had two Kampon geared steam turbines, each driving one propeller shaft, using steam provided by three Kampon water-tube boilers. The turbines were rated at a total of 52,000 shaft horsepower (39,000 kW) for a designed speed of 35 knots (65 km/h; 40 mph). However, the class proved capable of exceeding 35.5 knots on sea trials. The ships were designed with a range of 5,000 nautical miles (9,300 km; 5,800 mi) at a speed of 18 knots (33 km/h; 21 mph). However, the class more accurately proved to have a range of 6,053 nautical miles (11,210 km; 6,966 mi) on trials.

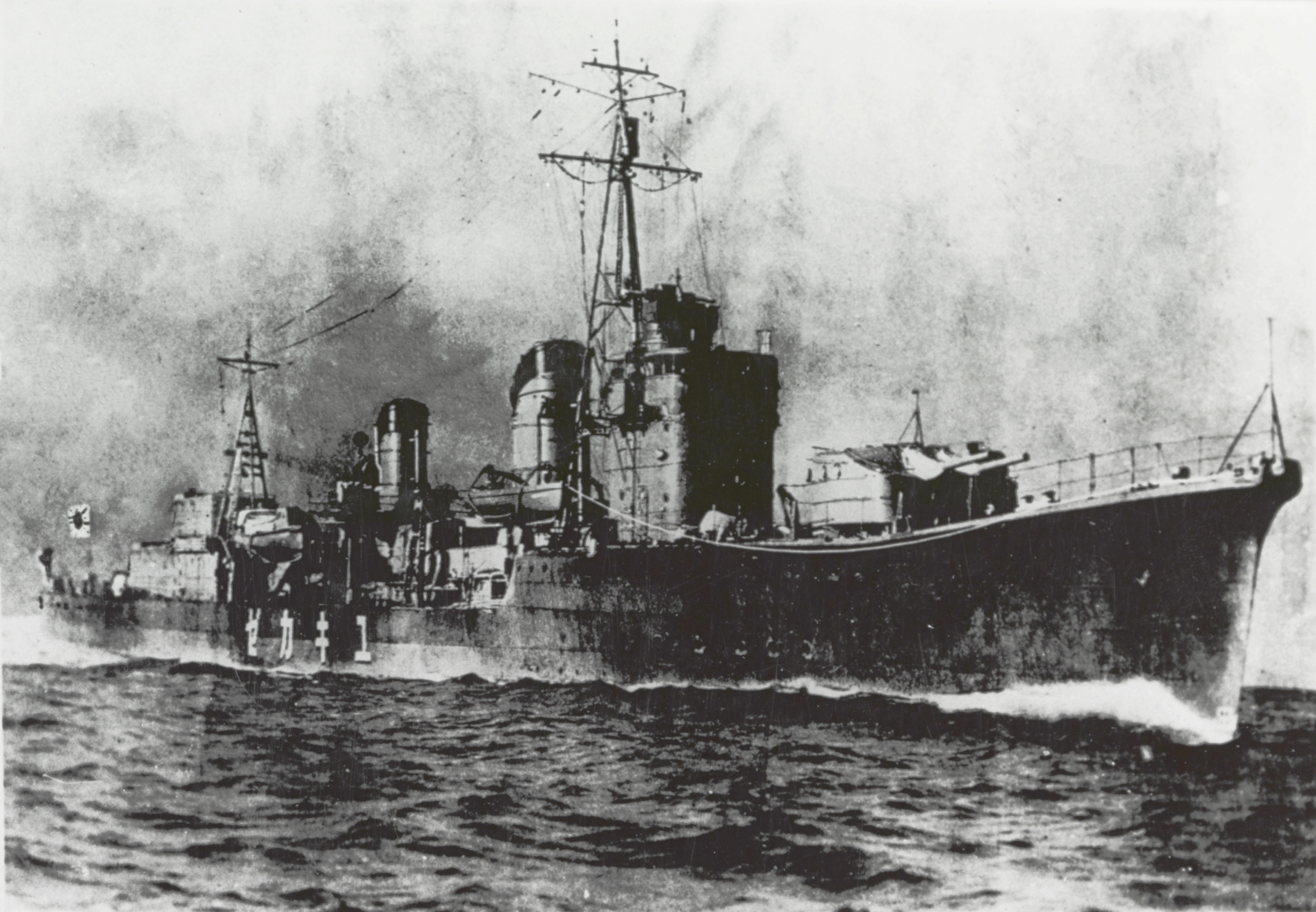
Yukikaze departing Sasebo on her maiden voyage, January 1940

The main armament of the Kagerō class consisted of six Type 3 127-millimeter (5.0 in) guns in three twin-gun turrets, one superfiring pair aft and one turret forward of the superstructure. They were built with four Type 96 25-millimeter (1.0 in) anti-aircraft guns in two twin-gun mounts, but more of these guns were added over the course of the war. The ships were also armed with eight 610-millimeter (24.0 in) torpedo tubes for the oxygen-fueled Type 93 "Long Lance" torpedo in two quadruple traversing mounts; one reload was carried for each tube. Their anti-submarine weapons originally consisted of 16 depth charges, but this was upgraded to 36 depth charges by June 1942. As the war went on, any remaining Kagerō class destroyers by 1944 had their X turret removed and replaced by up to 28 25-mm guns.

== Career in Imperial Japanese Navy ==
Yukikaze was laid down on 2 August 1938, launched on 24 March 1939, and completed on 20 January 1940, and upon commissioning she was appointed as the third ship of destroyer division 16 (Kuroshio, Hatsukaze, Yukikaze) and immediately saw a series of peacetime patrol duties and visits to foreign harbors. On 11 October 1940, Yukikaze took part in the 2,600 year anniversary Japanese navy fleet review, the last major fleet review before the start of the Pacific Theater. Then, at the end of 1940, the 16th destroyer division was reorganized; Kuroshio was reappointed to destroyer division 15, while the newly completed destroyers Amatsukaze and Tokitsukaze joined the group, and Yukikaze was appointed as flagship of Captain Shibuyu Shiro, while commander Tobida Kenjirō took personal leadership of the destroyer.

=== Beginning of the Pacific War ===
During the start of World War 2 for Japan, 7 December 1941, Yukikaze led destroyer division 16 in escorting the light carrier Ryūjō during an air raid on Davao. Throughout the rest of December and into January 1942, Yukikaze would escort invasion convoys heading to Legaspi, Lamon Bay, Menado, Kendari, and Ambon. On 20 February, Yukikaze would escort the invasion force destined for Timor. Then, on the 27th, Yukikaze would see her first active combat role taking part in the battle of the Java Sea, the destruction of the allied surface ships attempting to defend the Dutch East Indies against Japanese invasion. However, Yukikaze only led a torpedo attack that failed to land a single hit. In the aftermath of the battle, Yukikaze rescued some 40 survivors from several sunken allied warships. Commander Tobida interrogated Captain Thomas Spencer, the highest-ranking member of the survivors who had served as a gunnery chief on the destroyer HMS Electra, which was sunk in a gunfight with the destroyer Asagumo. No relevant information was found, but Spencer reportedly conversed about his birthplace in Scotland and graduation from the Britannia Royal Naval College. The next day, Yukikaze and Tokitsukaze located the submarine USS S-37 and together dropped 10 depth charges, completely destroying her starboard engine, breaking her coolers, and causing major flooding and an oil leak, forcing S-37 to retreat to Australia for immense repairs.

Continuing on to Bandjarmasin, in the early morning on 2 March, Yukikaze and Tokitsukaze located another submarine and dropped 10 more depth charges to unknown effect. Later that night, Yukikaze spotted another (possibly the same) submarine - which promptly crash dived - and dropped another 2 depth charges to unknown effect yet again. (Note: The identity of this submarine remains elusive. Some Japanese sources credit it as an assist kill on USS Perch, but this is extremely unlikely.) Right at the break of dawn on the fourth, Yukikaze sailed into Bandjarmasin and transferred all prisoners to the recently captured prison ship Tenno Maru (formerly the Dutch hospital ship SS Op Ten Noort), and after reloading her fuel and depth charges continued submarine patrols, but had no further encounters, then escorted the invasion force for New Guinea before returning to Davao. From 26 April to 2 May, Yukikaze was drydocked for maintenance, then steamed from Kure to Saipan.

In preparation for the Battle of Midway, Yukikaze would escort a number of troop transports for the phase of the battle which involved the invasion of Midway Island. However, through 3–6 June, the battle turned into one of the most devastating naval defeats of the entire war. Four Japanese aircraft carriers and a heavy cruiser were sunk by American aircraft carrier raids, prompting the invasion forces to retreat. After the battle, Yukikaze joined the main body force, and assisted the crippled heavy cruiser Mogami.

With such a blunder out of the way, it was off to the Guadalcanal campaign. Around this time, Yukikaze would receive a new captain, Ryokichi Kanma, and after a series a training missions, Yukikaze would see some action again as an aircraft carrier escort at the battle of Santa Cruz, 26 October. American aircraft carrier attacks damaged a number of Japanese vessels (but failed to sink any), but the attacks were mostly focused on the carriers as Yukikaze remained undamaged. The Japanese planes in turn sank the aircraft carrier USS Hornet and the destroyer USS Porter, and damaged or crippled several other vessels. With the battle concluded in a victory, the Japanese ships returned to Truk on the 30th.

=== Naval Battle of Guadalcanal ===
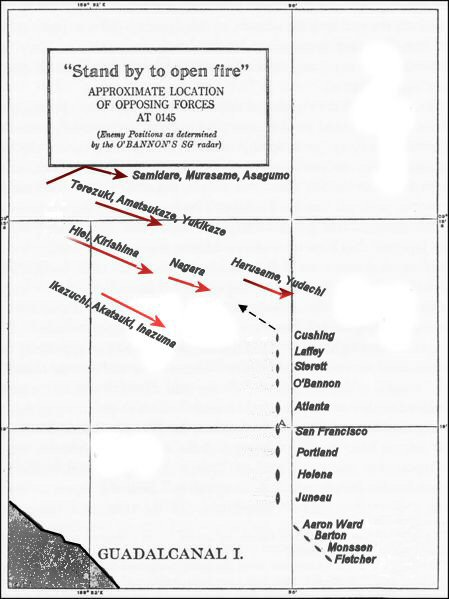
The formation of the Japanese and American warships during the first naval battle of Guadalcanal at 1:45 am

Yukikaze saw her first notable action in what would combinate into the first naval battle of Guadalcanal. With a goal of conducting another major bombardment on Henderson Field, a former Japanese air base which was captured by US forces and being used against Japanese shipping to great effect, the main ships of the force consisted of the battleships Hiei and Kirishima, each armed with eight 14-inch (356 mm) guns and a variety of smaller guns. Hiei served as Admiral Abe's flagship. Escorting the force came the light cruiser Nagara, and a total of eleven destroyers, including Yukikaze. The force departed on 9 November. While the destroyers initially operated in a standard formation, heavy rain squalls had managed to break up the formation and leave the destroyers operating in small clusters, in turn leaving Yukikaze operating alongside the destroyers Amastukaze and Teruzuki.

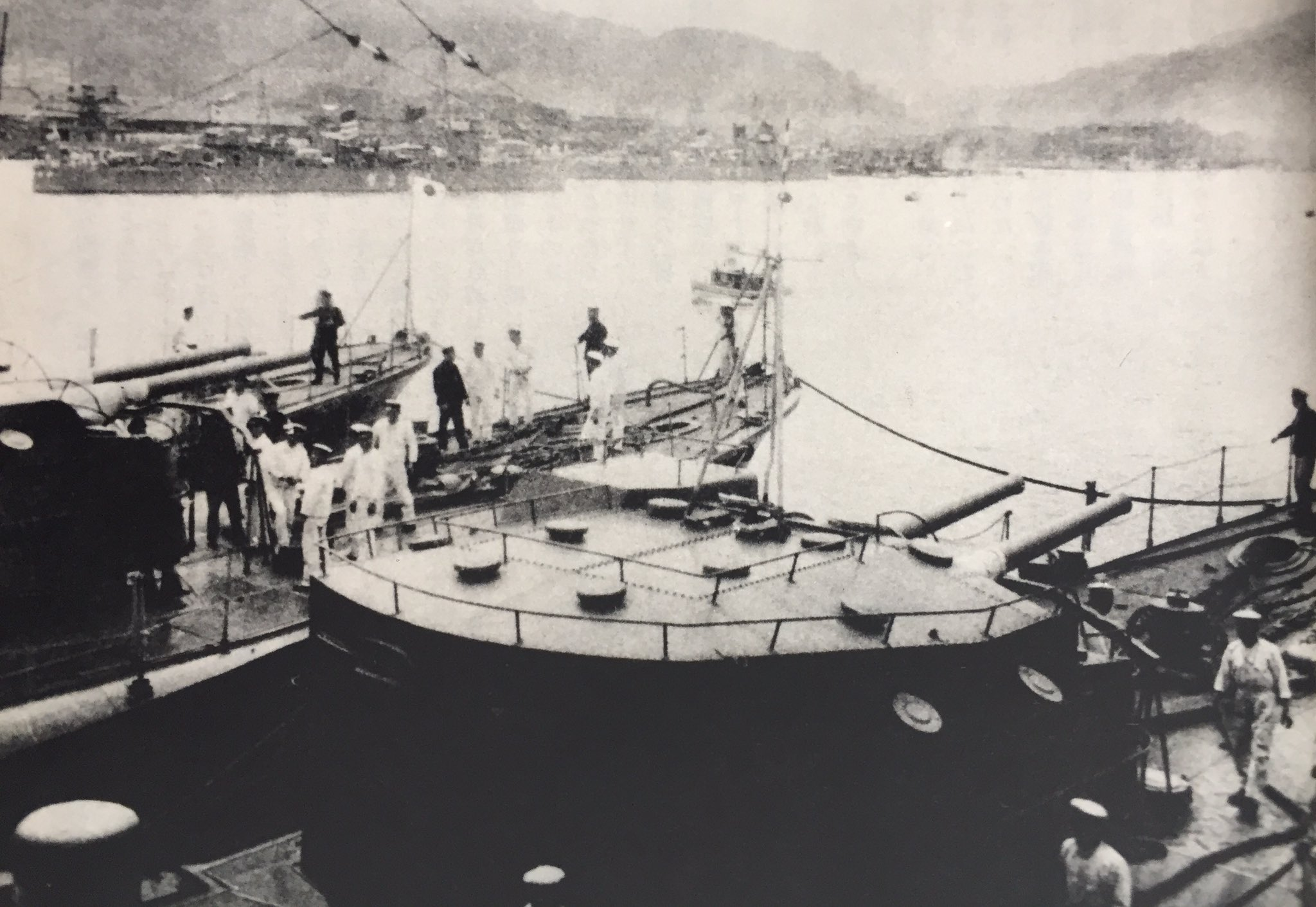
Japanese destroyers anchored in Keelung, April 1940. Yukikaze (left) and Kuroshio (right) are seen at a distance

In the early morning of the 13th, the force was en route when by 1:25, signs of enemy ships began to appear. A US naval squadron of two heavy cruisers, three light cruisers, and eight destroyers had intercepted the Japanese ships, and by 1:48 Hiei and the destroyer Akatsuki illuminated the light cruiser USS Atlanta, starting the battle in a point blank range skirmish which resulted in both Akatsuki and Atlanta's sinking. Yukikaze quickly rushed into the action. With the US formation left a scattered mess due to poor command decisions by Admiral Callaghan, Yukikaze along with Nagara and the destroyer Harusame engaged the lead American destroyer, USS Cushing. Cushing fired back at Yukikaze, and though no hits were scored machine gunfire killed a sailor on the deck, Yukikaze's first casualty. However, Yukikaze helped to inflict far more damage than she received, a barrage of Japanese shell hits disabled Cushing's electrical power and guns, leaving her dead in the water and set aflame. With Cushing rendered a defenseless floating wreck she was eventually abandoned at 2:30 and left to sink several hours later, losing 70 men in the process. (Note: Yukikaze was not joined by Amatsukaze or Teruzuki which were blocked from joining her by the destroyers Ikazuchi and Inazuma, and both operated independently for most of the battle. Teruzuki later further shelled USS Cushing as her crew were starting to put out a few fires, contributing to her sinking)

With an enemy destroyer on her kill sheet, Yukikaze just before 2:00 spotted the destroyer USS Laffey, which had just escaped a point blank range duel with Hiei where she raked her with gunfire, wounding admiral Abe and killing his chief of staff. Yukikaze opened fire and hit Laffey with three 5-inch (127 mm) shells, one of which hit and destroyed her number 2 5-inch (127 mm) gun turret, while simultaneously two 14-inch (356 mm) shells from Hiei hit the bridge and amidships superstructure. Yukikaze fired a spread of torpedoes, one of which hit Laffey aft, blowing her stern and propellers clean off, breaking her keel, disabling all electrical power, and starting a massive fire. (Note: Accounts of the battle overly reliant on American records sometimes differ on which destroyers engaged USS Laffey and the scorer of the fatal torpedo hit, but Japanese records make it clear Yukikaze and Nagara engaged Laffey, with Yukikaze scoring the torpedo hit.) The abandon ship order was issued as the massive fire caused by Yukikaze's torpedo hit suddenly blew up Laffey's turret 4 magazines and sank her instantly with the loss of 59 men.

As the destroyer USS O'Bannon swerved to evade the sinking Laffey, Yukikaze noticed her and briefly opened fire. No hits were scored, but a near miss detonated underneath the keel, temporarily disrupting O'Bannon's lighting and power. Yukikaze continued on sweeping for targets, and near the end of the battle she managed to ambush the destroyer USS Sterett and hit the destroyer with eight 5-inch (127 mm) shells. The damage destroyed Sterett's aft guns and torpedo tubes, set her on fire, killed 28 men and injured 13 others. However, all damage was inflicted above the waterline as Sterett limped away on her functional engine.

However, during a point-blank range gunfight Hiei was crippled by a pair of 8-inch (203 mm) shell hits fired from the heavy cruiser USS San Francisco that disabled her steering gear. Yukikaze attempted to assist the crippled Hiei, but aircraft from both Henderson Field and USS Enterprise attacked the vulnerable battleship, scoring several bomb hits which served as the final blow. Yukikaze came under light air attacks, and through a bomb near miss cracked a boiler no hits were scored, and damage was only minor before Abe ordered Yukikaze to moor aside her for assistance. While underway, Yukikaze passed by the badly damaged Amatsukaze, which had sunk the destroyer USS Barton and helped to sink the light cruiser USS Juneau, before being mauled by gunfire from the light cruiser USS Helena and being presumed sunk by her fellow Japanese ships. Yukikaze signaled surprise at Amatsukaze's survival and offered up assistance before Amatsukaze's crew refused, before the crews of both ships saluted each other and exchanged greetings before continuing on their way. Admiral Abe transferred his flag to Yukikaze, joined by a large quantity of Hiei survivors. It has been said Yukikaze assisted in scuttling Hiei with torpedo hits, but this is not backed up by substantial evidence. Yukikaze then withdrew from the battle to both transfer Hiei survivors and escort damaged and crippled Japanese ships to Truk, arriving to their destination on the 18th.

==== Operation Ke ====
Yukikaze would escort the aircraft carrier Hiyō between 5-10 December and the carriers Zuihō and Zuikaku between 18 and 23 January. With the start of 1943, Japan had finally decided to cut their losses and retreat from Guadalcanal, allowing an allied takeover of the Island. From 1–4 February, Yukikaze was one of the 20 destroyers that took part in both the first and second evacuations of Japanese troops. Yukikaze in particular transported the 17th army to safety. At a meeting at combined fleet headquarters, it was debated whether to use high speed motor boats for the final evacuation, but Captain Kanma, along with other destroyer commanders insisted that the evacuation was a job for their destroyers, even shouting together at some points. The Japanese command gave in, and Yukikaze took part in the final evacuation of Guadalcanal from the 7th to 8th. The evacuation was completely successful, and allied attacks were very light, only sinking the destroyer Makigumo and the submarine I-1. The Japanese in total rescued 10,652 troops from Guadalcanal.

During the evacuation, the destroyer Maikaze was crippled by air attacks, prompting Yukikaze to escort her to Truk from 10 to 14 February, before she escorted the transport ship Gokoku Maru from Rabaul to New Britain and back.

=== Battle of the Bismarck Sea ===
It was not long until Yukikaze felt the heat of action again. Lae was in desperate need of resupply in order to turn back General MacArthur's forces from New Guinea, and the 51st army division had just the heavy artillery to do that. A total of eight troop ships were sent out to reinforce Lae, escorted by eight destroyers, including Yukikaze and Tokitsukaze. Transiting through the Bismarck Sea on 1 March, allied reconnaissance planes spotted the force by 15:00. At the dawn of March 2, a squadron of B-17s attacked, sinking the troop ship Kyokusei Maru and damaging two more, prompting Yukikaze to assist in rescuing survivors. The next day, a second wave failed to sink any ships, but scattered the force, leaving the ships vulnerable, and when a third wave attacked, they sank a troop ship and the destroyer Arashio, and fatally wounded the destroyers Shirayuki and Tokitsukaze. Yukikaze removed Tokitsukaze's crew while others scuttled Shirayuki. Wave after wave of B-17s and B-25s attacked the force, and through heavy fighting all the remaining six troop ships were all sunk, alongside finishing off the crippled Tokitsukaze. Yukikaze and the other destroyers attempted to rescue as many survivors as possible, as they did so a final wave of B-17s sank the destroyer Asashio with most of her crew.

With the battle of the Bismarck Sea lasting from 2–4 March, all eight troop ships and four of the eight destroyers were sunk. Yukikaze survived completely undamaged. Having rescued survivors from several sunken ships, Yukikaze ferried them to Rabaul, arriving at her destination on 5 March. Immediately afterwards, Yukikaze sailed for a troop transport run to Kolombangara, arriving on 7 March. Throughout the rest of March and into April, Yukikaze took part in troop transport runs to Kolombangara, Rekata, Finschhafen, and Tuluvu. From 3–8 May, Yukikaze was drydocked and was refitted with radar and additional anti-aircraft guns, before taking part in a troop transport run to Nauru and back.

=== Battle of Kolombangara ===
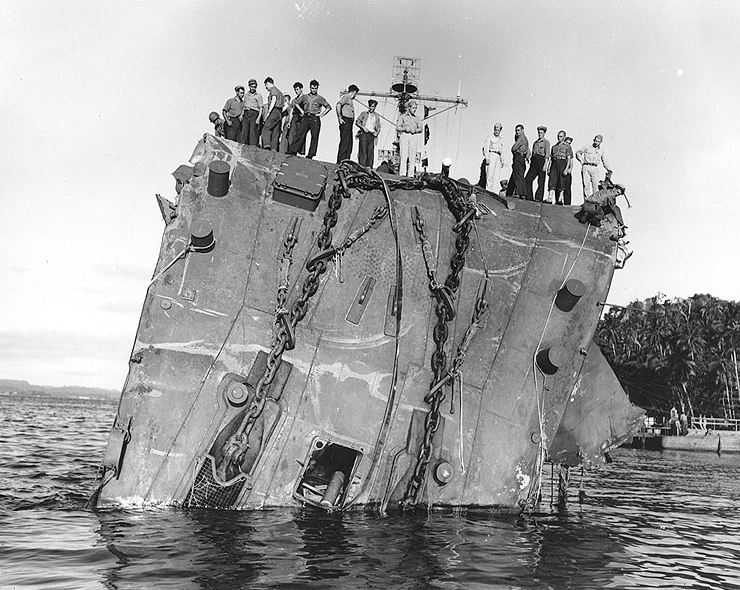
The collapsed bow of USS Honolulu following a torpedo hit from a mass torpedo attack that Yukikaze took part in.

On 9 July, Yukikaze departed on another troop transport run to Kolombangara. Protecting four destroyer transports carrying some 1,200 ground troops, Yukikaze due to her radar was the lead ship in a flotilla of destroyers, leading the destroyers Hamakaze, Kiyonami, and Yūgure. The four destroyers operated alongside the Japanese flagship, the light cruiser Jintsū, as well as the elderly destroyer Mikazuki.

The first three days of the run went relatively smoothly, but en route the force was spotted by allied coastwatchers, who relayed their information to allied intelligence. Hoping to ambush the Japanese ships, Admiral Ainsworth scrambled up a force consisting of the American light cruisers USS Honolulu and USS Saint Louis, alongside the New Zealand light cruiser HMNZS Leander, supported by 10 destroyers.

By 1:03 on the 13th, the allied ships were about 10,400 yards (9,500 meters) away from the Japanese task force, when in a critical moment, Jintsū illuminated the enemy ships with her searchlights. Honolulu, Saint Louis, and Leander all fired at Jintsū, drawing the complete attention of the allied ships and away from Yukikaze and the other destroyers. While Mikazuki stayed behind to assist Jintsū, Captain Kanma led his destroyers to partake in a torpedo attack on the allied ships, closing to 5,250 yards (4,800 meters) away from the enemy. At 1:20, Yukikaze, Hamakaze, Kiyonami, and Yūgure each fired a full spread of torpedoes at the allied ships. It was four minutes later that a long lance torpedo (probably) from Yukikaze made a critical hit as it slammed into Leander amidships as she was attempting to complete a turn. Yukikaze's hit killed 23 sailors and forced Leander to retire from the battle with severe damage. Leander was damaged so badly she could not be repaired in time to take further part in WW2, and on top of that never served as a New Zealand warship again, being decommissioned in May 1944 and transferred to the British Navy in September 1945.

In turn, the Japanese ships failed to save Jintsū. After being shelled into a floating wreck by gunfire mostly from Honolulu and Saint Louis, American destroyers closed to point blank range to deliver the final blow. At least one torpedo probably from USS Taylor made its mark, breaking Jintsū in half and finally finishing the cruiser off. This did not stop Kanma from ordering another torpedo strike against the allied ships. In just 18 minutes, the torpedo tubes on all four destroyers were fully reloaded and ready to fire. Yukikaze led the other destroyers to another torpedo attack, and by 1:50 had closed to around 4,900 yards (4,500 meters), Every allied ship that could fire their guns focused their attention on Yukikaze, which took some light damage from straddles and near misses. However, much to the amazement of Hamakaze's crew, Yukikaze was not directly hit by even a single shell. The destroyers promptly fired their torpedoes. While the scorers of the following hits are rather ambiguous, at 2:18 the first and second torpedo hits crippled Honolulu. One landed aft but was a dud, but the other landed forward and blew the cruiser's bow clean off. A third torpedo hit badly damaged Saint Louis, twisting her bow to the port side. A fourth and final torpedo fatally damaged the destroyer USS Gwin. The torpedo destroyed her engine room and caused significant flooding, forcing Gwin to be scuttled. (Note: Sources differ on whether Gwin immediately exploded and sank or was fatally damaged and needed to be scuttled, but far more sources support the idea that Gwin was scuttled rather than sinking naturally to battle damage.)

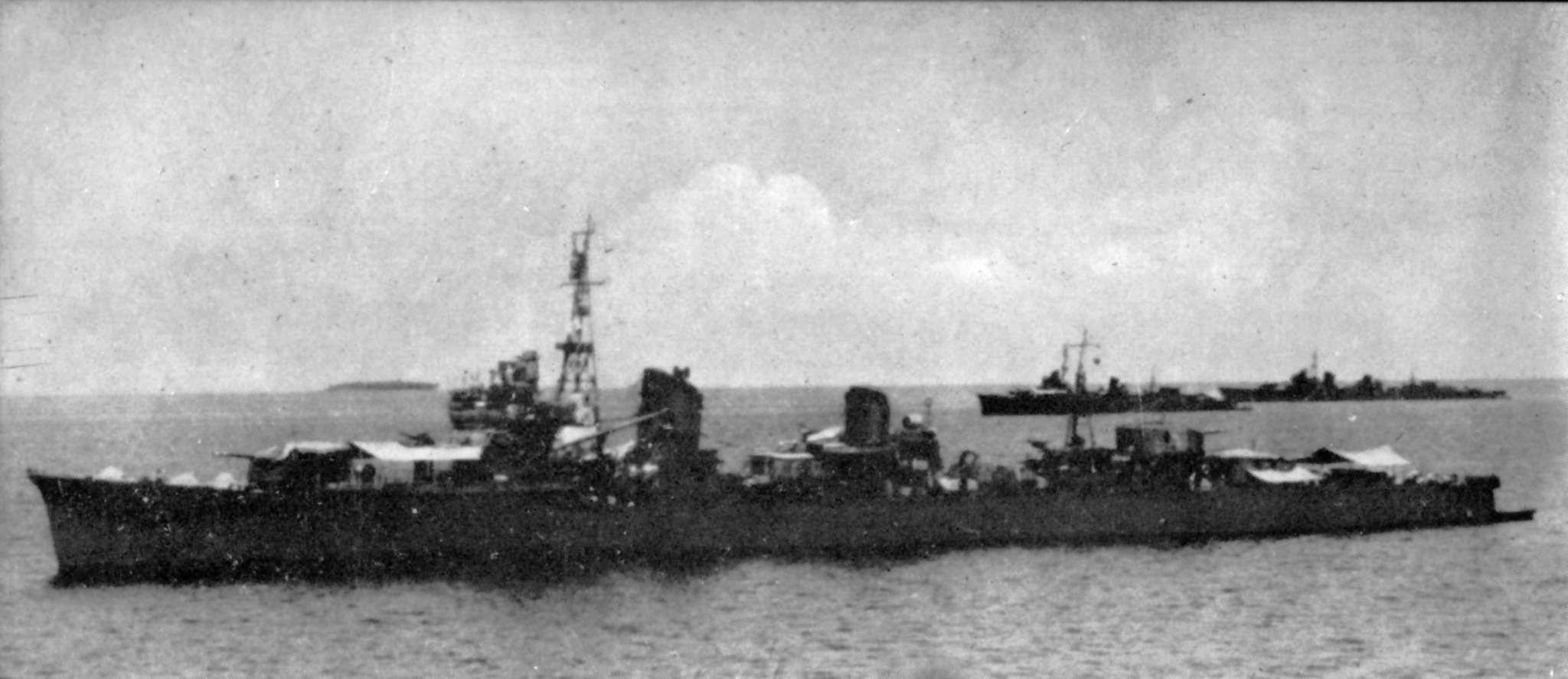
Yukikaze anchored off Rabaul, July 1943. The destroyers Tanikaze (left) and Kiyonami are seen in the background

While the battle was a costly victory with the loss of Jintsū, it was a victory nonetheless. Alongside the numerous allied ships sunk or critically damaged, the destroyer transports made it to Kolombangara and unloaded all 1,200 soldiers to reinforce the area. On 19 July, Yukikaze would take part in another troop transport run to Kolombangara, where en route both Kiyonami and Yūgure were sunk by land-based bombers the next day. Yukikaze saw another troop transport run to Kolombangara on the 23rd before departing from Rabaul to Truk, then escorting Japanese ships to Kure. From August to September 3, Yukikaze would undergo a major refit, which removed her aft superfiring 5-inch (127 mm) gun turret and replaced it with a pair of triple 25 mm machine guns, with the addition of more anti-aircraft guns and updated type 22 and type 13 radar. Upon refit, Yukikaze would spend the rest of 1943 taking part in various escorting duties. On December 10, Ryokichi Kanma was relieved of duty and replaced with commander Terauchi Masamichi.

=== Philippine Campaign ===
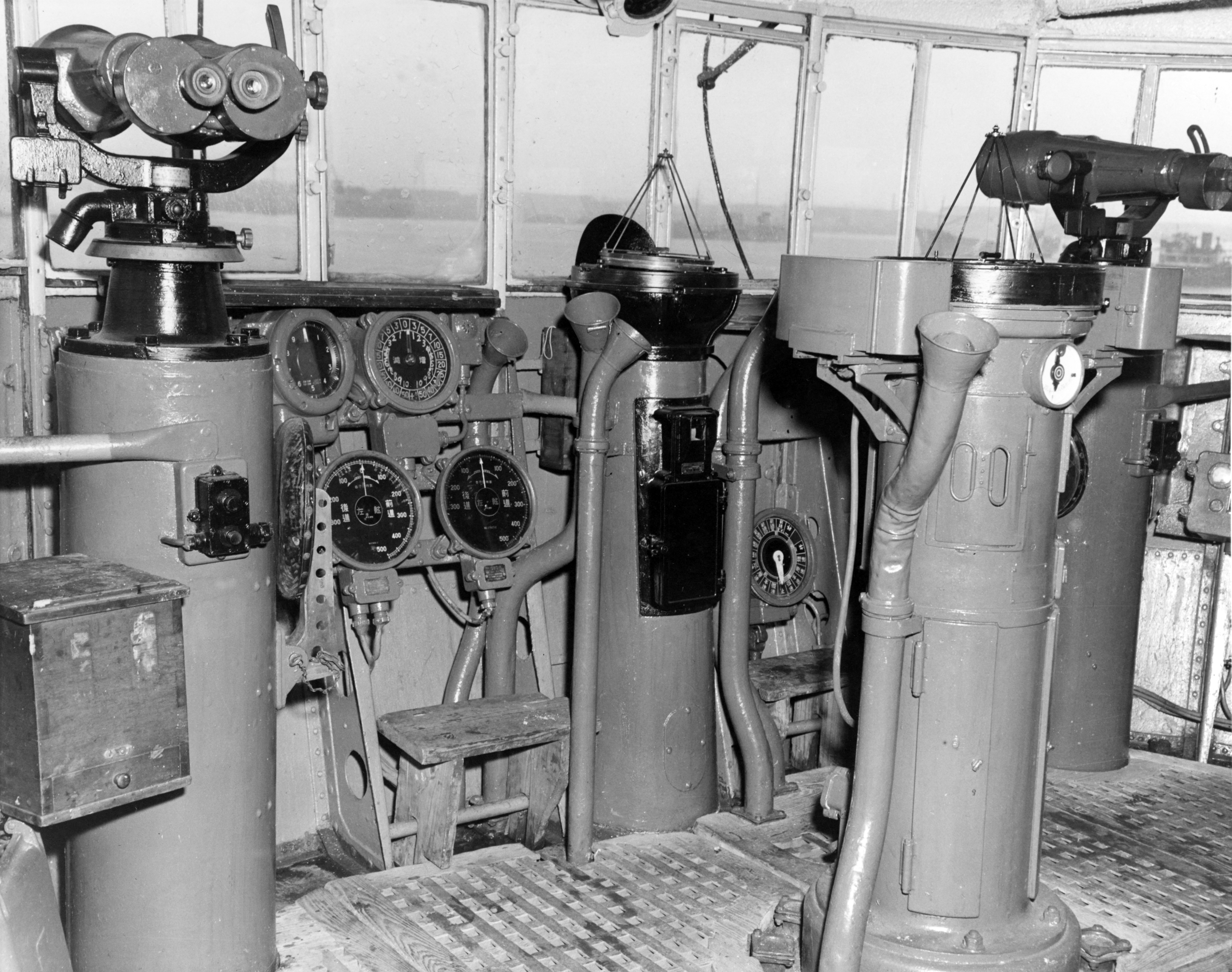
A view of Yukikaze's plot bridge, May 1947

Yukikaze would escort escorted high speed tankers from Moji to Singapore from the 11th to 20 January 1944, during which her consort, the Amatsukaze, was damaged beyond repair by a torpedo fired from the submarine USS Redfin. With Amatsukaze's crippling and Hatsukaze's and Tokitsukaze's sinking, the 16th destroyer division was dispensed, and Yukikaze was reassigned to destroyer division 17 (Urakaze, Isokaze, Tanikaze, Hamakaze). She then immediately afterwards escorted the light carrier Chitose and convoy HI-32 back to Moji, before escorting Chitose to Saipan and Yokosuka, then escorting the light carrier Zuihō to Guam throughout February and March. From April 20 to May 1st, Yukikaze escorted Japanese warships from Kure to Lingga. On May 22, Yukikaze scraped her hull on a reef while patrolling off Tawitawi, cutting her speed to 25 knots, which was more damage than any enemy forces had managed to inflict throughout her career.

Upon being repaired, Yukikaze would be tasked to take part in Operation A-Go, a planned decisive battle to protect the Philippines from allied liberation. With the fall of most of the Soloman Islands territories, the Philippines acted as a crucial supply line between mainland Japan and the Dutch East Indies. If the Philippines were taken over, it would sever the supply line and render Japan unable to function as a wartime economy. Yukikaze would see a major role escorting crucial oil tankers from submarine attack to operate with the Japanese ships, otherwise the force would not have enough fuel to operate. This still enraged commander Masamichi, since his ship was relegated to mere escorting duties, reportedly stating he would rather have Yukikaze sunk in battle than not see combat.

In the afternoon of 17 June, Yukikaze would fulfill her role when she protected the tankers from the submarine USS Cavalla. Two days later, the Japanese aircraft carriers launching raids on American warships, but only managed to damage the battleship USS South Dakota. In turn, Yukikaze's crew would witness the battle turn into a crippling defeat for the Japanese navy as submarine attacks sank the new armored aircraft carrier Taihō and the Kido Butai veteran aircraft carrier Shōkaku, the latter having been sunk by Cavalla's torpedoes. American aircraft from USS Belleau Wood on the 20th sank the aircraft carrier Hiyō, before planes from USS Wasp attacked Yukikaze's group, fatally damaging the oil tankers Gen'yo Maru and Seiyo Maru. Yukikaze removed Seiyo Maru's crew before scuttling her, while others did the same to Gen'yo Maru. Alongside the multiple Japanese ships sunk, American forces destroyed over 400 Japanese aircraft. The battle effectively destroyed Japan's carrier fleet as a fighting force.

Having survived the battle of the completely undamaged, Yukikaze would escort the surviving oil tankers to Kure, arriving to their destination on July 2, before being drydocked from July 5 to August 15. She would not leave Kure until September 25, when she escorted the battleships Fusō and Yamashiro to Lingga.

=== Battle of Leyte Gulf ===
Yukikaze, Hamakaze, and Urakaze (left to right) anchored in Brunei shortly before the battle of Leyte Gulf, 21 October 1944

Yukikaze departing Brunei (as seen from Isokaze), 22 October 1944

On 20 October, Yukikaze arrived at Brunei to meet up with the rest of the Japanese fleet intended to take part in Operation Sho-Go. Due to the destruction of Japan's carrier fleet, their plan was to use their mostly intact surface fleet to engage and sink American troop convoys heading towards the Leyte Gulf and whatever escorts protected them, using the remnants of Japan's carrier task force armed with Kamikaze suicide bombers to distract the large naval fleets led by Admiral Halsey. Yukikaze departed on 22nd with Admiral Kurita's center force, consisting of Japan's "super battleships", Yamato and Musashi, the largest and most powerful battleships ever built, alongside the older but capable battleships Nagato, Kongō, and Haruna, escorted by 10 heavy cruisers, 2 light cruisers, and 15 destroyers including Yukikaze. Upon departing, Yukikaze joined the other destroyers of squadron 10 in forming a ring around the southern formation, protecting Musashi, Kongō, and Haruna.

On the 23rd, the plan would immediately begin to fall apart as the opening stages of the battle of Leyte Gulf began. Torpedo attacks from the submarines USS Darter and USS Dace sank the heavy cruisers Atago and Maya and damaged the heavy cruiser Takao beyond repair, forcing her out of the battle alongside the destroyers Naganami and Asashimo to escort her. On the 24th, the center force came under the much feared US carrier attacks in what would become known as the battle of the Sibuyan Sea. Yukikaze got off undamaged, but a number of ships were damaged, notably the heavy cruiser Myōkō was forced to withdraw from the battle due to an aerial torpedo hit, taking the destroyers Hamakaze and Kiyoshimo with her for protection. A low number of Japanese ships were actually sunk, but that was because the air attacks were mostly focused on Musashi. Over a seven hour long battle, Musashi was hit by a minimum of 17 bombs and 19-20 torpedoes, leaving her dead in the water and adrift. It would take a further two hours for the crippled Musashi to slip beneath the waves and sink by the bow.

==== Battle off Samar ====
Admiral Kurita ordered a retreat from the battle. However, two hours later, he revealed the retreat to be false and ordered the center force to steam back to the battle. The false retreat successfully fooled the American forces into believing the center force was well out of the battle, and following the annihilation of Admiral Nishimura's Southern Force at the battle of the Surigao Strait, when US forces discovered the decoy carrier force, Admiral Halsey took his ships to engage it, leaving the troop convoys vulnerable. By the morning of the 25th, the center force was diminished to four battleships, six heavy cruisers, two light cruisers, and eleven destroyers. Yukikaze was left operating alongside the destroyers Urakaze, Isokaze and Nowaki, led by the light cruiser Yahagi. Just before 6:00, the force would come into contact with Taffy 3, a group of six small escort carriers, three destroyers, and four destroyer escorts. Yamato fired the first salvos into the battle, followed by the other large warships, opening up the battle off Samar. Yukikaze would take part in a torpedo attack on the escort carriers USS Kalinin Bay and USS Saint Lo. However, none of the torpedoes made their mark. In particular, a Japanese torpedo was dangerously close to hitting Kalinin Bay when US fighters intercepted and destroyed it with machine gunfire.

As they prepared for another torpedo attack, Yukikaze and the other destroyers would then notice the limping destroyer USS Johnston attempting to cover the sinking escort carrier USS Gambier Bay. (Note: American accounts of the battle usually list six destroyers operating alongside Yahagi, but Japanese records only credit Yukikaze, Isokaze, Urakaze, and Nowaki for engaging Johnston.) Johnston was already crippled by several 18.1-inch (46 cm) shell hits from the Yamato – disabling her 5-inch (127 mm) gun turrets 3, 4, and 5 and steering wheel and cutting her speed to 17 knots – but Commander Evans ordered an attack and attempted to cross Yukikaze's T. Yahagi recognized this and ordered her destroyers to turn broadside, and scored at least one 6-inch (152 mm) shell hit that destroyed Johnston's turret 2 before turning away to attack the escort carriers. Yukikaze, Isokaze, Urakaze, and Nowaki closed to 6,000 yards and smothered Johnston in 5-inch (127 mm) gunfire. Shell hits destroyed her remaining turret and her remaining boilers and engine; exploded in her bridge, radio room, and superstructure; blew off her forward funnel; damaged her forward torpedo mount; detonated AA guns and ammunition; and started a large fire next to her bridge which forced her command staff to evacuate to the stern, alongside poking many holes below the waterline. After 45 minutes of intense punishment from Yukikaze and others, the abandon ship order was issued as Johnston was evacuated and left to sink with the loss of 186 men. Yukikaze inspected Johnston within throwing distance and pumped one last salvo into the ship to make sure she sank, before saluting the valiant destroyer for her bravery, with Captain Masamichi personally paying his respects to the US sailors and a large number of the crew doing the same. Masamichi allegedly saw Commander Evans salute Yukikaze back in a lifeboat with tears in his eyes. This would prove to be the last time Yukikaze engaged enemy ships during her service in the Japanese navy.

Throughout the battle, mixed surface and air attacks sank the heavy cruisers Chōkai, Chikuma, and Suzuya and permanently damaged the heavy cruiser Kumano, as well as damaging other ships. Yukikaze was ordered to assist the then crippled but still afloat Chikuma but was called off as Nowaki took her place. (Note: Nowaki was sunk the next day by a US cruiser-destroyer group with the loss of all hands, including the Chikuma survivors) Combined with the previous losses faced during the battle, Admiral Kurita finally lost his nerve. Believing he had sunk several fleet carriers and cruisers, he ordered a retreat from the battle, leaving the troop convoys untouched. Throughout the next few days, further air attacks sank the light cruiser Noshiro and several destroyers, but Yukikaze came out without being hit. By the 27th, the battle of Leyte Gulf was over, and on the 28th, what remained of Kurita's center force managed to return to Brunei, during which Yukikaze was refueled by Haruna.

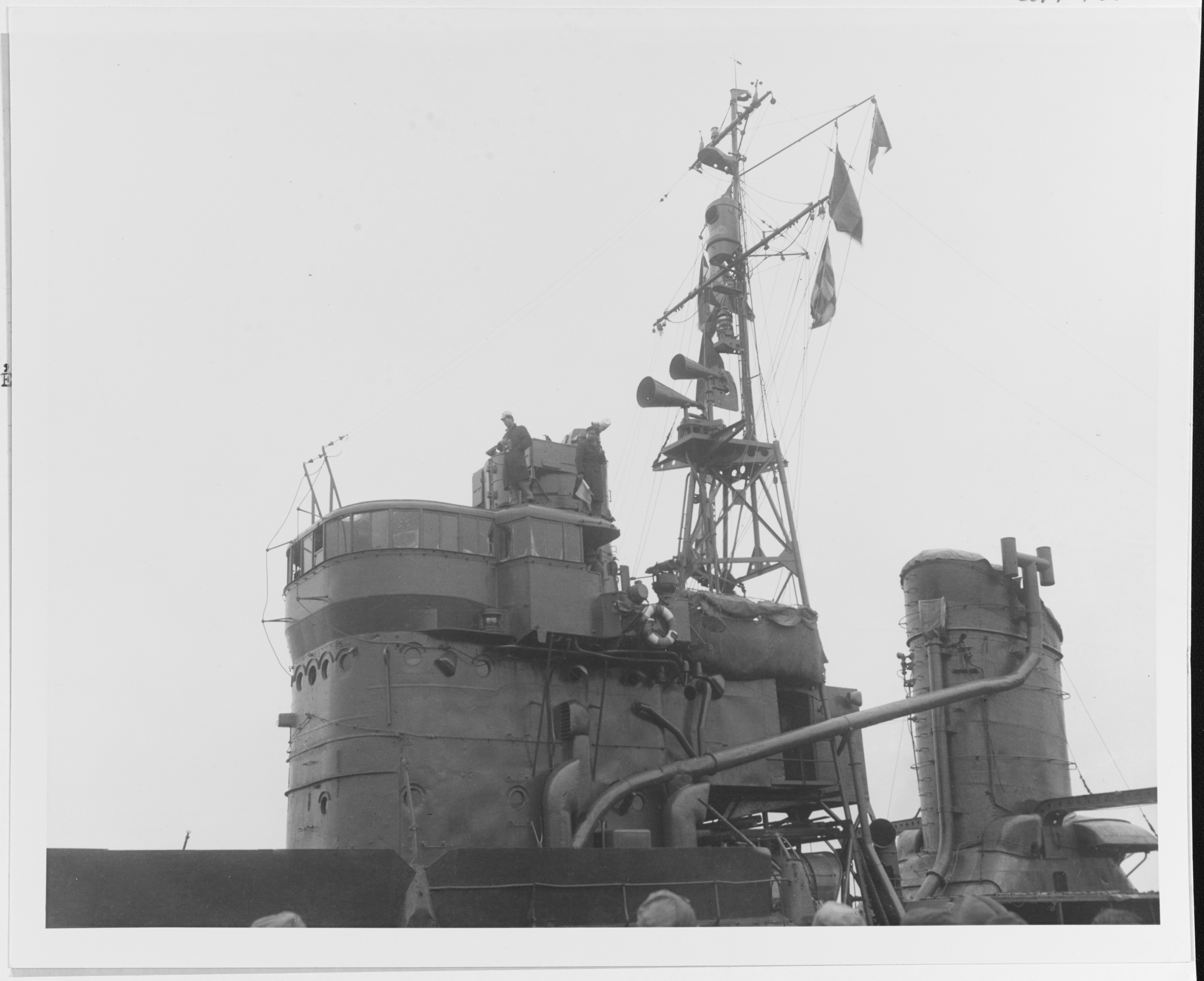
Yukikaze's bridge, photographed in May 1947.

=== Final months of the war ===
While stuck in Brunei, the Japanese fleet would come under air attacks, during which strafing from fighters killed one of Yukikaze's machine gunners, prompting her crew to hold a funeral on the deck. As American forces slowly but successfully liberated the Philippines, the Japanese ships desperately needed to evacuate the increasingly dangerous area. In November, Japanese warships would begin to flee the area, culminating on the 16th when the main fleet left Brunei permanently and set sail to Kure, with Yukikaze being assigned to protect the capital ships. On the 22nd, both the battleship Kongō and the destroyer Urakaze were torpedoed and sunk by the submarine USS Sealion, but Yukikaze and the rest of the force successfully arrived at Kure on the 24th. The next day, Yukikaze escorted the battleship Nagato to Yokosuka.

==== Escorting the Shinano ====
Upon arriving at Yokosuka, Yukikaze would be assigned to an important mission. The Japanese aircraft carrier Shinano was one of Japan's largest warships, having been converted from a Yamato class battleship. Several days earlier, she was spotted by a B-29 bomber, and due to Japan fearing follow up air attacks, Shinano was commissioned before being fully fitted out, most crucially her watertight doors were either not installed correctly or not installed at all. Yukikaze, along with Isokaze and Hamakaze were tasked with escorting Shinano from Yokosuka to Kure. The four ships departed on the 28th. However, en route just after 3:00 on the 29th, signs of an enemy submarine began to appear. Isokaze signaled to Yukikaze to defense Shinano, but she never received the message. Fearing a wolf pack, Shinano undertook maneuvers, which ironically showed a full broadside to the lone submarine USS Archerfish. Archerfish fired a spread of torpedoes, four of which hit their mark. Admiral Abe (Note: Admiral Toshio Abe is not to be confused with Admiral Hiroaki Abe, commander of Hiei during the naval battle of Guadalcanal.) initially ignored the damage, given how many hits her half sistership Musashi took before sinking, but over several hours as it became clear that fatal damage was inflicted due to the incomplete nature of the ship, it was too late. Even if Shinano was complete, according to some accounts in the presence of flooding pumps and other damage control equipment, whatever crew Shinano had instead resorted to forming bucket chains throughout the ship. By 11:00, Shinano fully capsized and sank, with Yukikaze picking up several survivors.

Upon Shinano's sinking, Yukikaze retreated to Moji. She would remain there until 29 December, when she escorted a troop convoy to Formosa and back. From January to March 1945, Yukikaze would take part in a number of training exercises. During this time, Shigure, the destroyer sent to replace Yukikaze on escorting duties, was torpedoed and sunk by the submarine Blackfin.

==== Operation Ten Go ====
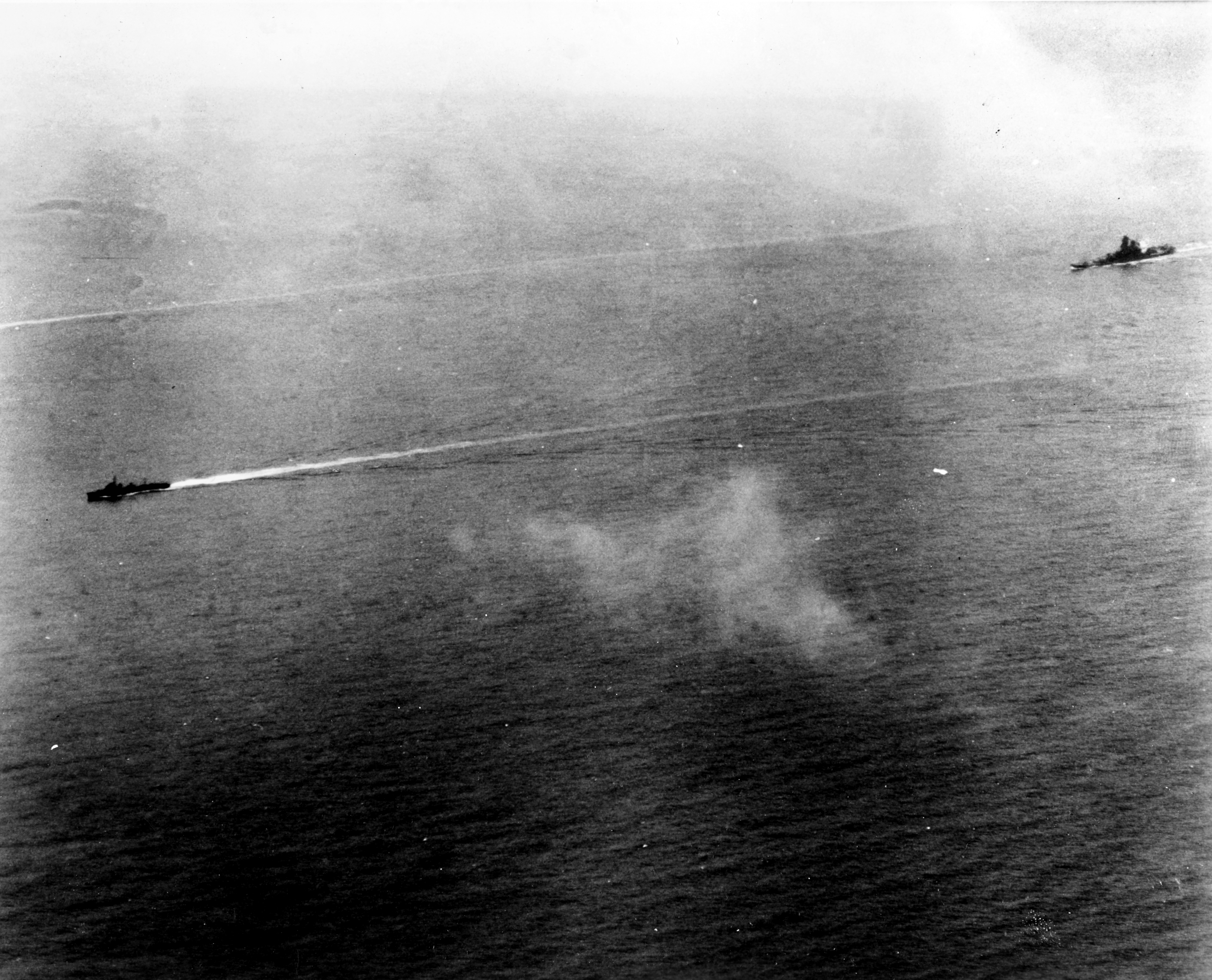
Yukikaze under air attacks during Operation Ten Go, leading the battleship Yamato which can be seen listing heavily to port, 7 April 1945

In April 1945, an invasion of Okinawa, Japan's last defensible position besides the mainland itself was imminent. While the army was willing to do anything it could to defend Okinawa, the navy was more concerned with reserving what few ships it had for the eventual battle on mainland Japan. However, Emperor Hirohito reportedly questioned the navy's lack of action to defend Okinawa, and thus a plan was scrambled up. The navy would send out battleship Yamato on a mission to beach herself on the Island and act as a stationary unsinkable gun fortress to destroy allied landing convoys. In turn, an escort was quickly scrambled up to protect Yamato. The plan was named Operation Ten-Go, becoming part of the overall battle of Okinawa.

Yukikaze would be one of nine escorts tasked with defending Yamato from any potential allied attacks. She would be reunited with a number of ships she fought with in previous battles, such as the light cruiser Yahagi and the destroyers Hamakaze, Isokaze, and Asashimo. She would also serve with other warships for the first (and last) time, such as the destroyers Hatsushimo, Kasumi, Fuyutsuki, and Suzutsuki. On 6 April, the force departed Tokuyama. Just a few hours later, they were spotted by US submarines, which could not attack due to the force's high cruising speed, but still radioed the Japanese ship's location. Throughout the rest of the day and into the 7th, the force was trailed by Catalina floatplanes.

By 11:30, the Japanese ships would be attacked by a total of 386 aircraft from US aircraft carriers. Planes from Franklin and San Jacinto quickly sank Asashimo, which was suffering engine trouble, before sinking Hamakaze as well. Further air attacks quickly overpowered and sank Yahagi, and as Isokaze attempted to assist her, she too was fatally damaged by bomb near misses. By that point, Isokaze was the last Kagerō class destroyer still afloat besides Yukikaze. (Note: The still unrepaired Amatsukaze was eventually scuttled on April 10, but had run aground a day prior to Isokaze's sinking after being bombed by land-based aircraft.) Dive bombers then fatally damaged Kasumi, while torpedo bombers crippled Suzutuki with a torpedo that blew off her bow. With most of her escorts either sunk or out of the fight, the remaining air attacks all focused on Yamato, which was already badly damaged. Over a three hour long battle, Yamato took at least 7 bombs and 13 torpedoes before she sank in a massive magazine explosion, sinking faster to less hits than Musashi due to being attacked at the port side only as opposed to any angle. For her part, Yukikaze survived the battle with only strafing damage, killing 3 sailors and injuring 15 others. Yukikaze first rescued survivors from Yamato. Afterwards, Yukikaze approached the floating wreck that was Isokaze, and removed her crew before scuttling the last of her sisterships, while others did the same to Kasumi.

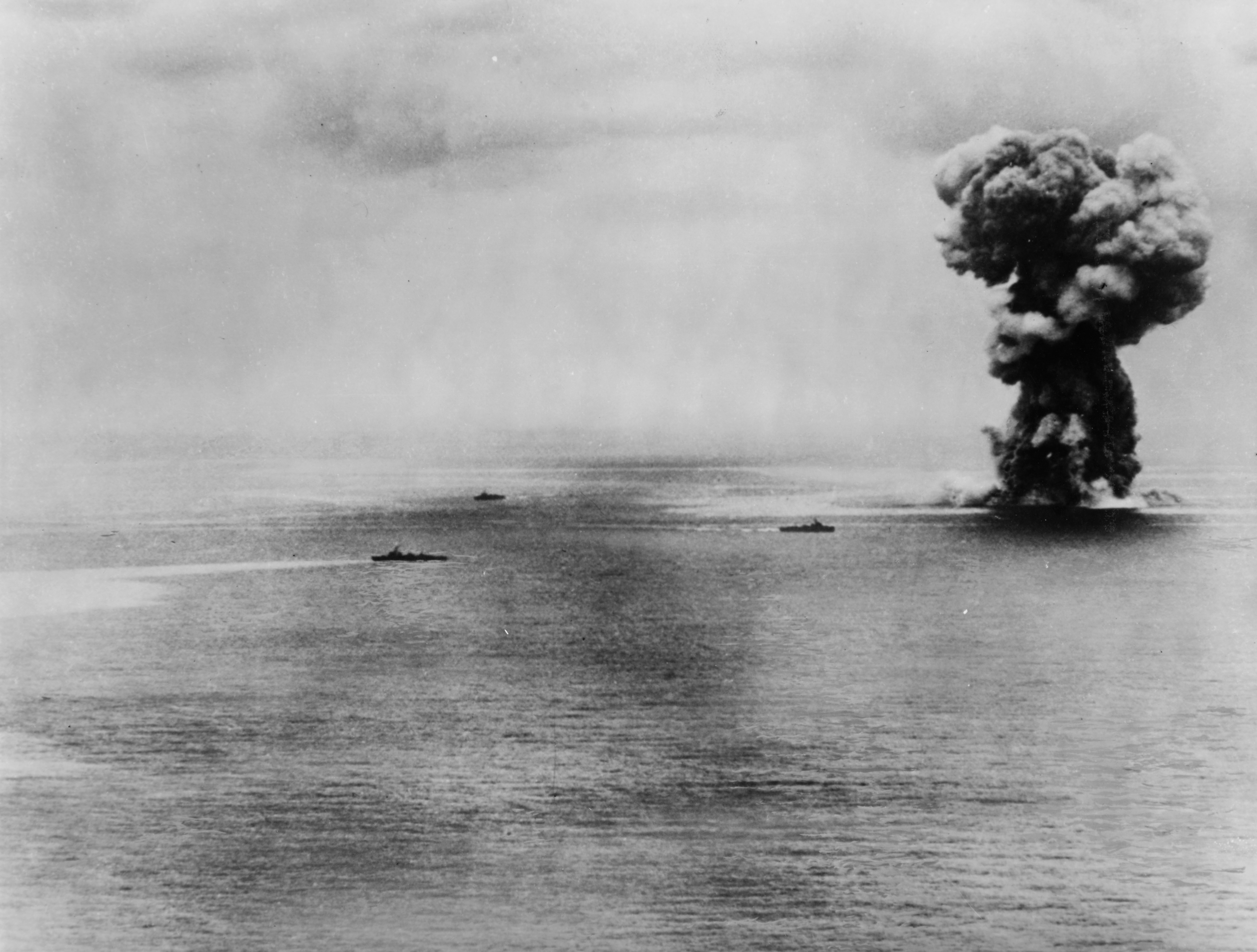
A photograph of the massive mushroom cloud after the battleship Yamato exploded and sank. Yukikaze, Hatsushimo, and Fuyutsuki (R to L) can be seen circling the area for survivors

Yukikaze steamed to Sasebo after the ordeal was over, where she dropped off Yamato and Isokaze survivors. Throughout the rest of April and into May, Yukikaze was limited to patrol duties, and eventually with Japan's oil reserves almost entirely depleted, Yukikaze could not even set sail and was stuck in port without fuel. On 30 May, carrier aircraft attacked Maizuru harbor, and while no direct hits were scored on Yukikaze, shrapnel damaged killed one sailor and injured 20 others to varying degrees. Shortly afterwards, Yukikaze was given enough fuel to escape Maizuru along with Hatsushimo. During the journey, Hatsushimo struck a mine and was forced to run aground, but Yukikaze successfully arrived at Ōjima. Upon arrival, Yukikaze was camouflaged, and spent the rest of the war anchored on security duties. On 30 July, Yukikaze took further minor damage from aircraft strafing, killing one man and injuring several others.

As a result of participating in and surviving some of the most dangerous battles the IJN had fought while avoiding any major damage whatsoever, never being hit by a single naval shell, torpedo, or air dropped bomb, Yukikaze is called "the unsinkable ship" and "the miracle ship". Yukikaze took part in more than 10 major battles, and more than 100 escort missions and resupply transport missions during World War II.

=== End of the war ===
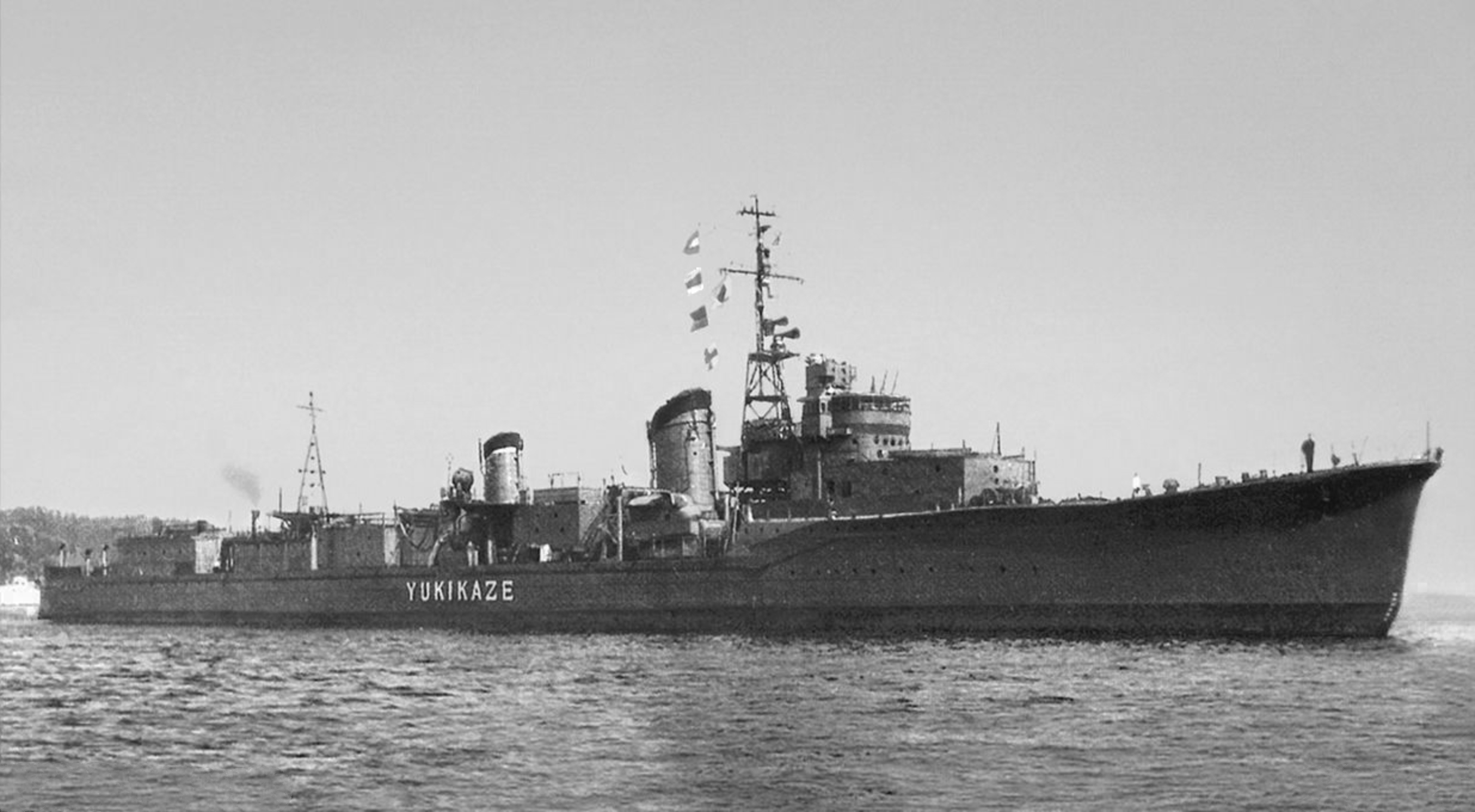
Yukikaze anchored in Kure following the WW2's end during her service transporting Japanese prisoners of war.

After the atomic bombings of Hiroshima and Nagasaki, on 15 August 1945, Emperor Hirohito announced that the Japanese would unconditionally surrender to allied forces. Upon the announcement, Yukikaze's camouflage was removed, and her crew prepared for the war's end, which included secret documents on the ship being destroyed. A day after the formal Japanese surrender in Tokyo Bay, she was inspected by allied intelligence. Yukikaze was stripped of all her guns, and like many surviving Japanese warships she would be used to transport Japanese prisoners of war. Yukikaze's name was written in English on both sides of the hull.

== ROCS Dan Yang ==
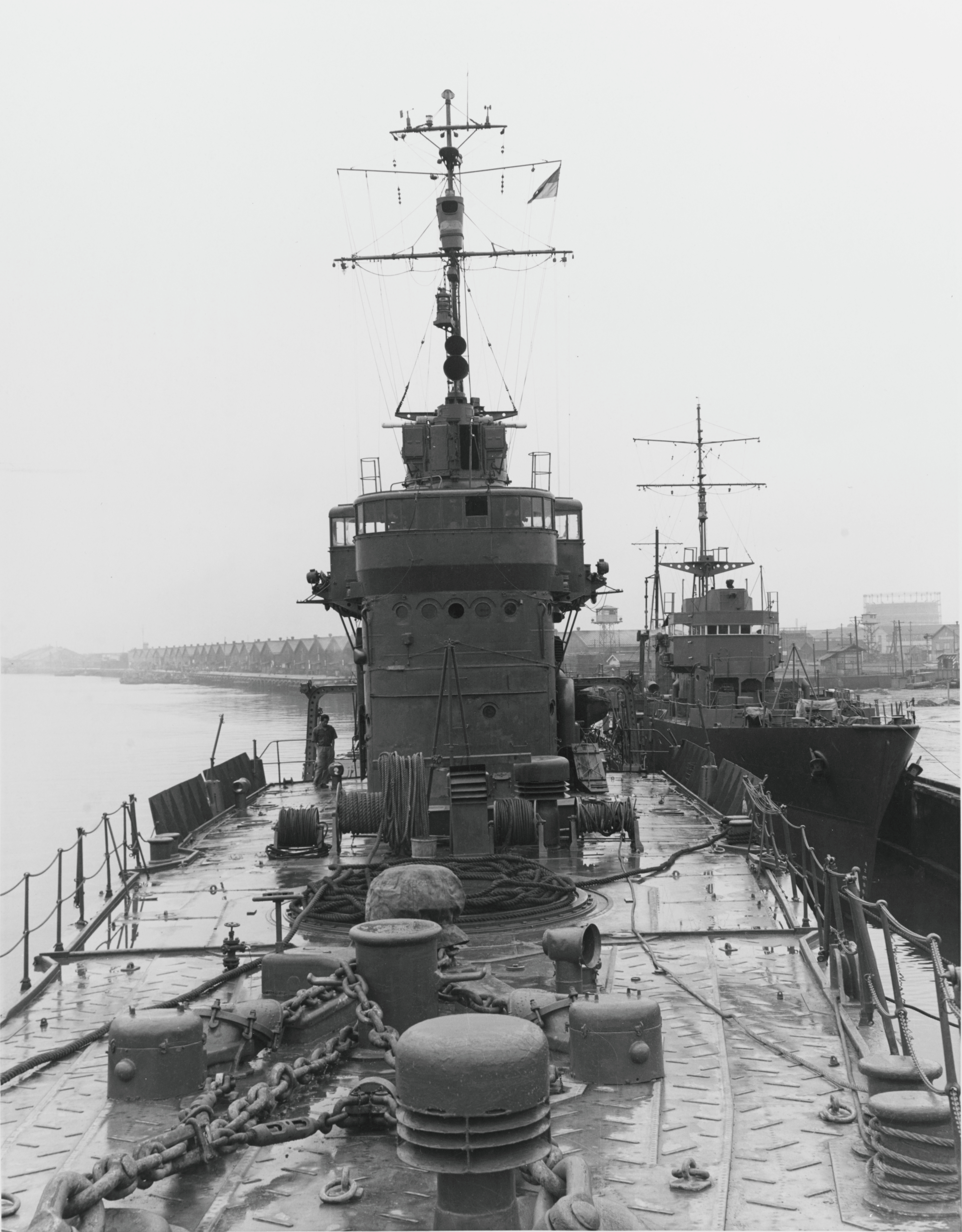
Yukikaze alongside escort ship Shisaka at Tokyo after they were used to repatriate Japanese nationals from overseas, May 1947

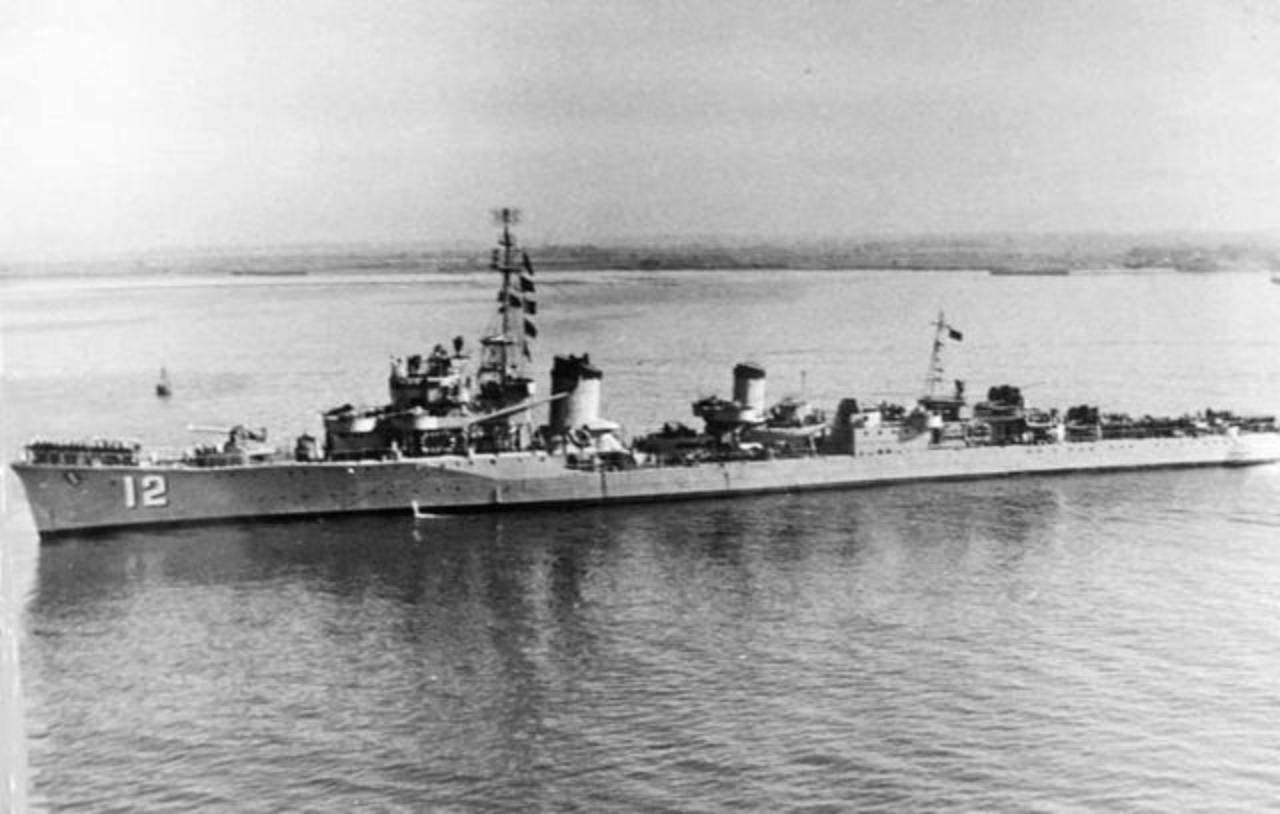
Dan Yang in ROC Navy service

On 6 July 1947, Yukikaze was transferred to the Republic of China as a war reparation, where she was renamed Dan Yang (丹陽 DD-12). All destroyers were named after Yang regardless of country of origin.

Dan Yang served as flagship of the Republic of China Navy. It was an unarmed training vessel until 1952. In 1953, it was fitted with Type 89 12.7 cm/40 dual mounted guns, in addition to the Type 98 10cm/65 dual mounted guns already in use. In 1956, Dan Yang had all the Japanese armaments removed and replaced with three open air mounted 5"/38 caliber guns, 3"/50 caliber guns replaced the torpedo tubes, Bofors 40 mm guns, and newer depth charge launchers. The Republic of China Navy had no use for the original torpedo tubes as they did not have access to the appropriate armaments.

She is notable for visiting Manila where 50,000 overseas Chinese visited her in August 1953. Dan Yang's service included patrolling the South China Sea and intercepting incoming ships carrying wartime materials into Shanghai. On 4 October 1953, she captured the Polish civilian oil tanker Praca at 21°06'N 122°48'E in the West Pacific Ocean, 125 sea miles southeast of Taiwan. On 12 May 1954, she bombarded and captured another Polish civilian freighter Prezydent Gottwald with machinery and medicines at 23°45'N 128°35'E. On 23 June 1954, she captured the civilian oil tanker Tuapse of the Soviet Union carrying kerosene eastbound at 19°35′00″N 120°39′00″E in the high sea of Balintang Channel near Philippines All ships were confiscated into the ROC Navy list, and the crews were either released, executed or detained for various time frames up to 35 years in captivity till 1988. She also saw action along the Taiwan Strait in a supporting role as she was one of the few ships with long range guns. However, the arrival of surplus US destroyers entering service put the famous destroyer that once served as flagship into retirement, and she was scrapped in 1970 after being damaged beyond repair in a typhoon in 1969.

In Japan, there was a campaign to have her returned to Japan from Taiwan for preservation as a museum ship since she was a symbol of longevity. Her rudder and one of her anchors were repatriated to the Japan Navy Academy Museum as a good will gesture.

== In popular culture ==
- In 1964, the movie "Destroyer Yukikaze" was released, focusing on her action during the initial invasion of the Philippines and Dutch East Indies, the battle of the Java Sea, the battle of Leyte Gulf, and Operation Ten Go through the perspective of main character Yutaro Kida. However, the film does not include the naval battle of Guadalcanal and battle of Kolombangara, Yukikaze's most significant actions. As Yukikaze was still in Taiwanese service, the movie was filmed aboard the JDS Yukikaze, a Harukaze class destroyer commissioned in 1956.
- Yukikaze was prominently featured in the final act of the 2023 Japanese movie Godzilla Minus One and played a key role in the finale and the defeat of Godzilla, being one of four destroyers to catch the monster in a trap (alongside Hibiki, Yūkaze, and Keyaki). After Yūkaze and Keyaki are destroyed by Godzilla as a distraction, Yukikaze and Hibiki trap Godzilla in a net, connected to canisters containing Freon which aerate the water, causing him to sink before being hauled back to the surface with cables and air balloons in an attempt to kill him through decompression. The water pressure severely injures but fails to kill Godzilla, but right before he can destroy the two ships, the main character flies into Godzilla's mouth (after ejecting from his plane), which explodes, destroying his head and causing his body to fall apart. While Yukikaze and Hibiki both play equal roles in defeating Godzilla, Yukikaze is the main focus of the battle due to being sailed by several main characters, and her fame in Japanese pop culture.
- A film focusing on the Yukikaze was released in August 2025.

== Readings ==
- Chesneau, Roger, ed. (1980). Conway's All the World's Fighting Ships 1922–1946. Greenwich, UK: Conway Maritime Press. ISBN 0-85177-146-7.
- Dodson, Aidan & Cant, Serena (2020). Spoils of War: The Fate of Enemy Fleets after Two World Wars. Barnsley, UK: Seaforth Publishing. ISBN 978-1-5267-4198-1.
- Jentschura, Hansgeorg; Jung, Dieter & Mickel, Peter (1977). Warships of the Imperial Japanese Navy, 1869–1945. Annapolis, Maryland: United States Naval Institute. ISBN 0-87021-893-X.
- Whitley, M. J. (1988). Destroyers of World War 2. Annapolis, Maryland: Naval Institute Press. ISBN 0-87021-326-1.
- Cutler, Thomas J. (1994). The Battle of Leyte Gulf 23-26 October 1944. Harpercollins. ISBN 978-0-06-016949-7.
- John W. Garver (1997-04-30). The Sino-American Alliance, Nationalist China and American Cold war Strategy in Asia. Armonk: M. E. Sharpe, Inc. ISBN 978-0-7656-0053-0.
- Robert Accinelli (1996-01-23). Crisis and Commitment: United States Policy toward Taiwan, 1950-1955. The Journal of American History. ISBN 0-8078-2259-0.
- Stille, Cdr Mark (2008). Imperial Japanese Navy Battleship 1941–1945. Oxford: Osprey Publishing. ISBN 978-1-84603-280-6
- Tameichi Hara (1961). Japanese Destroyer Captain. New York: Ballantine Books. ISBN 978-0-345-02522-7
- Brett L Walker (2024). Yukikaze's War. Cambridge University Press. ISBN 978-1-108-83729-3
- Masataka Chiyaka; Yasuo Abe (1972). Warship Profile 22; IJN Yukikaze/Destroyer/1939-1970. Profile Publications Ltd.
- Samuel Eliot Morison (1949). The Struggle for Guadalcanal, August 1942 – February 1943. History of United States Naval Operations in World War II. Vol. 5. Boston: Little, Brown and Company. ISBN 978-0-316-58305-3
- Samuel Eliot Morison (1950). Breaking the Bismarcks Barrier, vol. 6 of History of United States Naval Operations in World War II. Castle Books. ISBN 978-0-7858-1307-1
- Morison, Samuel Eliot (1958). Leyte: June 1944 – January 1945 History of United States Naval Operations in World War II. Vol. XII. Little, Brown and Company. ISBN 978-0-316-58317-6
