= Hiburi-class escort ship =

Imperial Japanese Navy ship

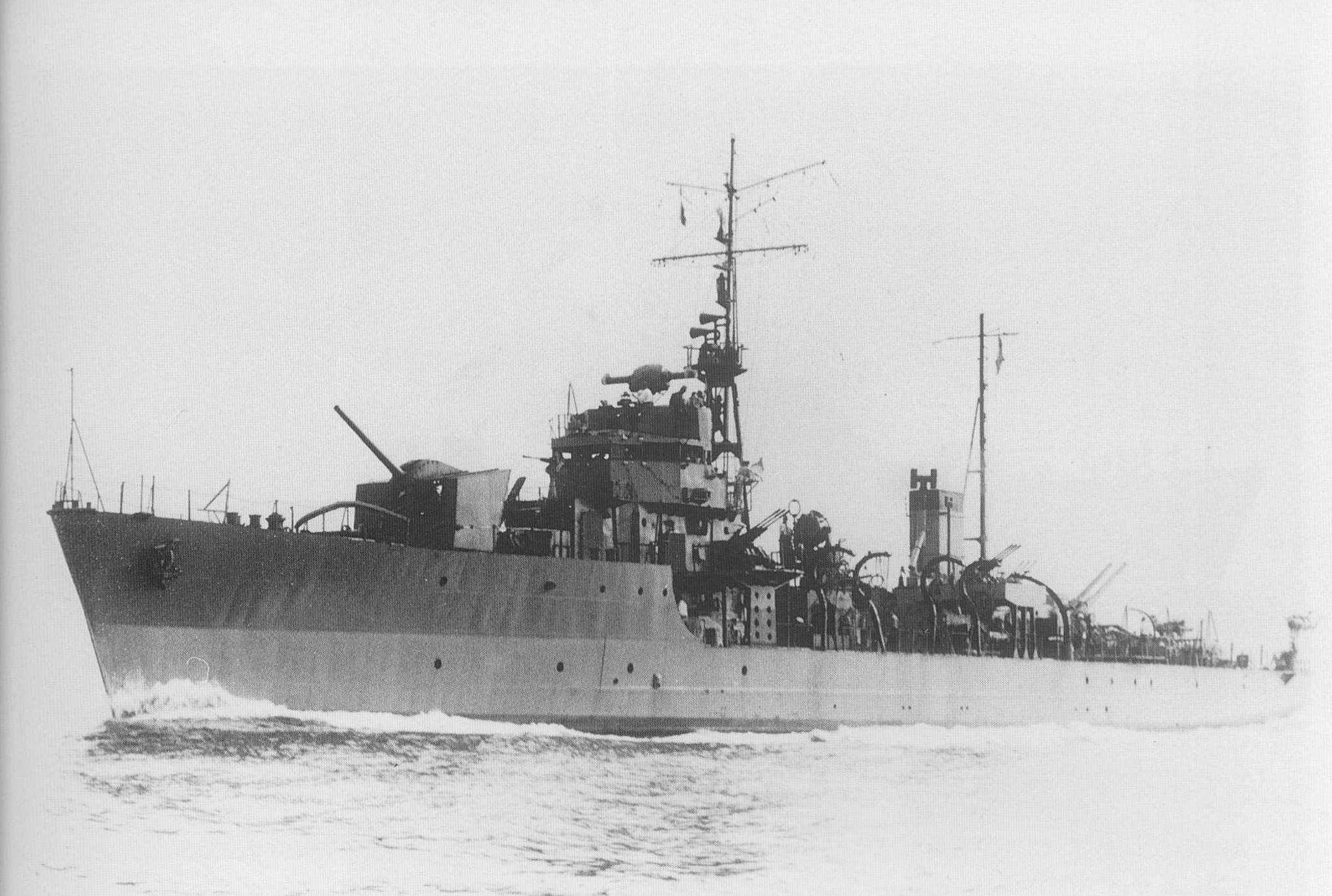
- Daitō or Shōnan

Class overview
- Name: Hiburi class
- Builders: Hitachi Zōsen Corporation
- Operators: Imperial Japanese Navy; Japan Meteorological Agency; Japan Coast Guard; Republic of China Navy; People's Liberation Army Navy
- Preceded by: Mikura class
- Succeeded by: Ukuru class
- Cost: 5,112,000 JPY (as the Etorofu class under the Maru Kyū Programme); 6,200,000 JPY (as the Ukuru class under the Kai-Maru 5 Programme)
- Built: 1944–1945
- In commission: 1944–1990
- Planned: 11 (converted from 3 of the Mikura class, and 8 of the Ukuru class)
- Completed: 9
- Canceled: 2
- Lost: 5
- Retired: 4

General characteristics
- Type: Escort ship
- Displacement: 940 long tons (955 t) standard
- Length: 78.77 m (258 ft 5 in) overall
- Beam: 9.10 m (29 ft 10 in)
- Draught: 3.06 m (10 ft 0 in)
- Propulsion: 2 × Kampon Mk.22 Model 10 diesels; 2 shafts, 4,200 bhp (3,100 kW)
- Speed: 19.5 knots (22.4 mph; 36.1 km/h)
- Range: 5,000 nmi (9,300 km) at 16 kn (18 mph; 30 km/h)
- Complement: 150
- Armament: Hiburi, June 1944; 3 × 120 mm (4.7 in) L/45 AA guns; 6 × Type 96 25 mm AA guns; 120 × Type 95 depth charges; 2 × Type 94 depth charge projectors; 2 × depth charge throwers; 1 × 22-Gō surface search radar; 1 × Type 93 active sonar; 1 × Type 93 hydrophone; 2 × Paravanes; Shisaka, 1945; 3 × 120 mm (4.7 in) L/45 AA guns; 16 × Type 96 Type 96 25 mm (0.98 in) AA guns; 120 × Type 2 depth charges; 3 × Type 94 depth charge projectors; 2 × depth charge throwers; 1 × Type 3 81 mm mortar; 1 × 22-Gō surface search radar; 1 × 13-Gō early warning radar; 2 × Type 3 active sonars; 1 × Type 93 hydrophone

The Hiburi-class escort ship (日振型海防艦,, Hiburi-gata Kaibōkan) was a design development from the Mikura-class escort ships of the Imperial Japanese Navy (IJN), serving during and after World War II.

== Background ==
In the Rapid Naval Armaments Supplement Programme of 1941, the Imperial Japanese Navy ordered the construction of thirty escort vessels (kaibōkan) – designated as #310 to #339 of that Programme, to provide escort ships for the Navy. Fourteen of these were planned as Etorofu class (Escort ship Type-A) of 860 tons standard displacement and sixteen as Mikura class (Escort ship Type-B) of 940 tons, although in the Budget (for which 153,360,000 yen was provided for the ships, or 5,112,000 per ship) they were all stated to be of 1,200 tons. However, three of the Mikura class (ships #328, #333 and #339) were subsequently designated as to be built to the Hiburi design.

In the next year's Modified 5th Naval Armaments Supplement Programme, the IJN ordered the construction of another thirty-four ships to a modified version (Ukuru class) of the Type-B design; these were designated as #5251 to #5284 of that Programme. However, eight of these ship (ships #5252, #5254, #5257, ##5259 and #5263 to #5266) were subsequently designated to be built to the Hiburi design. Only six of the eight were so completed, with #5265 and #5266 being incomplete at the end of the Pacific War and broken up.

The eleven ships were all ordered from the Hitachi Zōsen shipbuilding concern at Sakurajima, which had also received other orders for ships completed to the Etorofu, Mikura and Ukuru designs. The Hiburi design used the same hull as the Ukuru class, but with different fittings. In 1943, the Japanese Navy General Staff (Gunreibu) promoted the building of Escort ship Type-A, the Etorofu class and Escort ship Type-B, the Mikura class and Ukuru class. However, the Navy General Staff also noted that too many man-hours of work were needed for their building.

== Design ==
- The Navy Technical Department (Kampon) used the Ukuru's basic designs for the new drawings. It was a chimera of Mikura and Ukuru classes.
- The new drawings had the following characteristic.
  - Armaments and under waterline designs were same as Mikura.
  - Everything else was same as in the Ukuru.
- The Kampon estimated man-hours for building will be between 42,000 to 40,000.
- The new drawing was sent to the Hitachi Zōsen Corporation, Sakurajima Shipyard. Those ships of the Mikura class and the Ukuru class that had not been started were converted to the Hiburi class. The Hitachi Zōsen built all of the Hiburi class vessels.

== Ships in class ==
Of the nine ships completed, three were sunk by US submarines and two by naval mines.

Ship #	Ship	Laid down	Launched	Completed	Fate
#328	Hiburi (日振)	3 January 1944	10 April 1944	27 June 1944	Sunk by USS Harder at west of Manila, 22 August 1944.
#333	Daitō (大東)	17 April 1944	24 June 1944	7 August 1944	Sunk by naval mine at Tsushima Strait, 16 November 1945.
#339	Shōnan (昭南)	23 February 1944	19 May 1944	13 July 1944	Sunk by USS Hoe at south of Hainan Island, 25 February 1945.
#5252	Kume (久米)	26 May 1944	15 August 1944	25 September 1944	Sunk by USS Spadefish at Yellow Sea 33°54′N 122°55′E, 28 January 1945.
#5254	Ikuna (生名)	30 June 1944	4 September 1944	15 October 1944	Decommissioned on 30 November 1945. Transferred to Meteorological Agency 26 December 1947, and renamed Ikuna-maru. Transferred to Maritime Safety Agency 1 January 1949, and renamed Ojika (PS-102). Decommissioned on 25 May 1963.
#5257	Shisaka (四阪)	21 August 1944	31 October 1944	15 December 1944	Decommissioned on 15 September 1945. Surrendered to Republic of China on 6 July 1947, and renamed Huian. Defected to People's Liberation Army 23 April 1949. Sunk by aircraft at Yanziji, 28 April 1949. Repairs were completed on 24 December 1953, and given the pennant number 218. Decommissioned in 1990.
#5259	Sakito (崎戸)	7 September 1944	29 November 1944	10 January 1945	Decommissioned on 20 November 1945. Scrapped January 1947.
#5263	Mokuto (目斗)	5 November 1944	7 January 1945	19 February 1945	Sunk by naval mine at Kanmon Straits, 4 April 1945.
#5264	Habuto (波太)	3 December 1944	28 February 1945	7 April 1945	Decommissioned on 23 October 1945. Surrendered to United Kingdom on 16 July 1947, later scrapped.
#5265	Ōtsu (大津)	12 January 1945	10 May 1945		Not completed by the end of the war (95%). Scrapped on 25 March 1948.
#5266	Tomoshiri (友知)	5 March 1945			Not completed by the end of the war (20%). Scrapped on 23 October 1947.

== Appendix ==
- Classification of the Kaibōkan classes in IJN official documents
  - The Shimushu, Etorofu, Mikura, Hiburi and Ukuru were classed in the Shimushu class.
  - The IJN changed their classification on 5 June 1944, because the shipyards and commanders were confused.
  - The Escort ship Type-B and Modified Type-B were combined to the Escort ship Type-A, and Type-Bs became extinct thereby.

Before 5 June 1944			>>	And after 5 June 1944		
Plan names	Official class names	Common class names	>>	Plan name	Official class names	Common class names
Type-A	Shimushu class	Shimushu class	>>	Type-A	Shimushu class	Shimushu class
Type-A	Shimushu class	Etorofu class	>>	Type-A	Shimushu class	Etorofu class
Type-B	Shimushu class	Mikura class	>>	Type-A	Mikura class	Mikura class
Type-B	Shimushu class	Hiburi class	>>	Type-A	Mikura class	Hiburi class
Modified Type-B	Shimushu class	Ukuru class	>>	Type-A	Ukuru class	Ukuru class
Type-C	No.1 class	No.1 class	>>	Type-C	No.1 class	No.1 class
Type-D	No.2 class	No.2 class	>>	Type-D	No.2 class	No.2 class

== Gallery ==
(Changes of equipment and under waterline design)

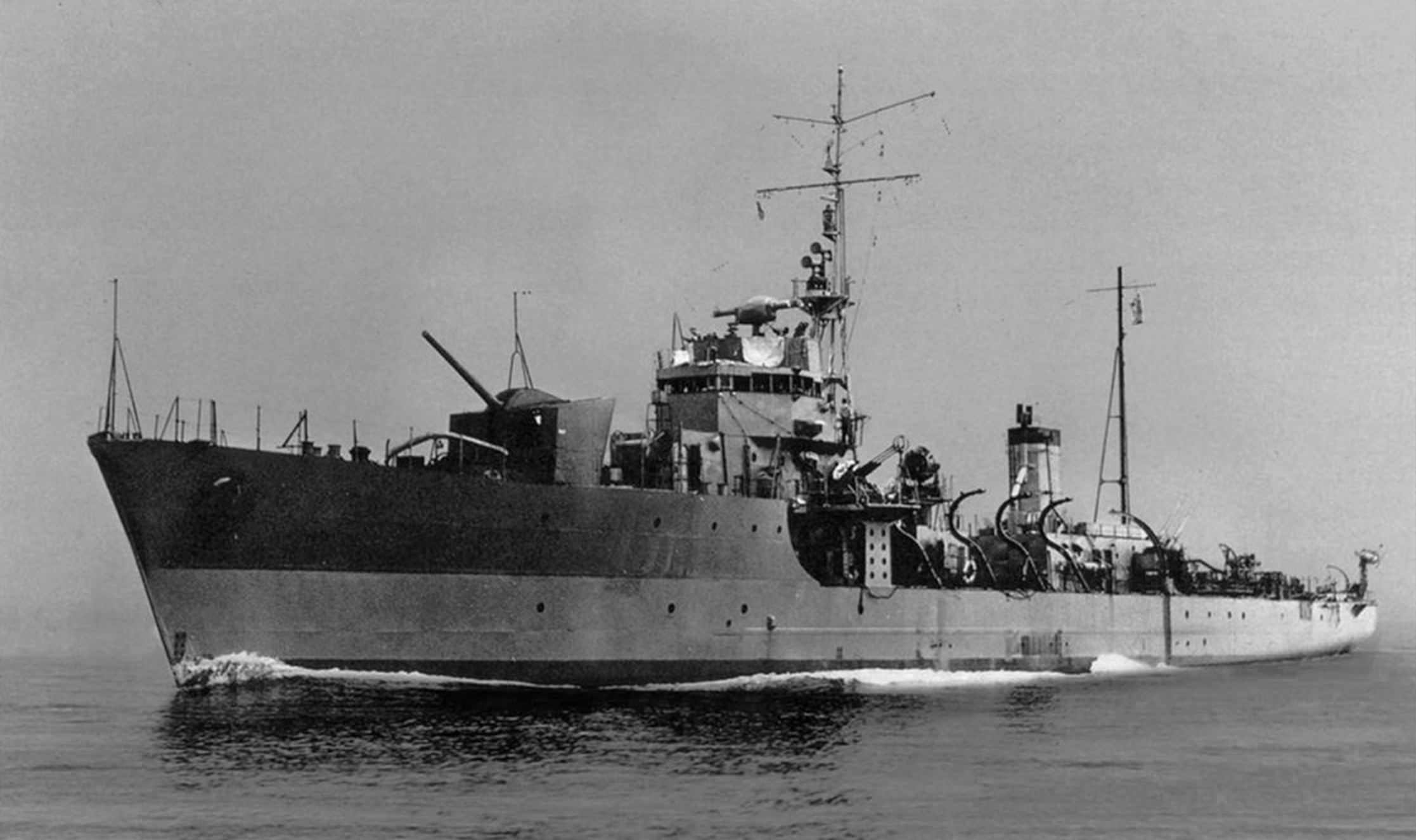
Daitō or Shonan in August 1944

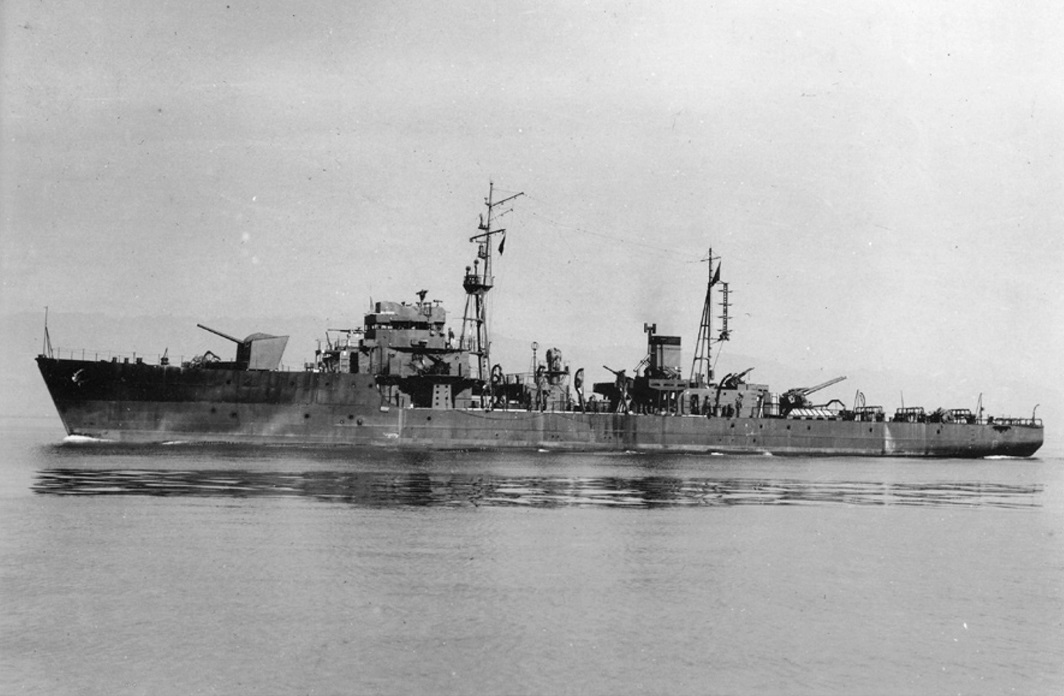
Ikuna in October 1944

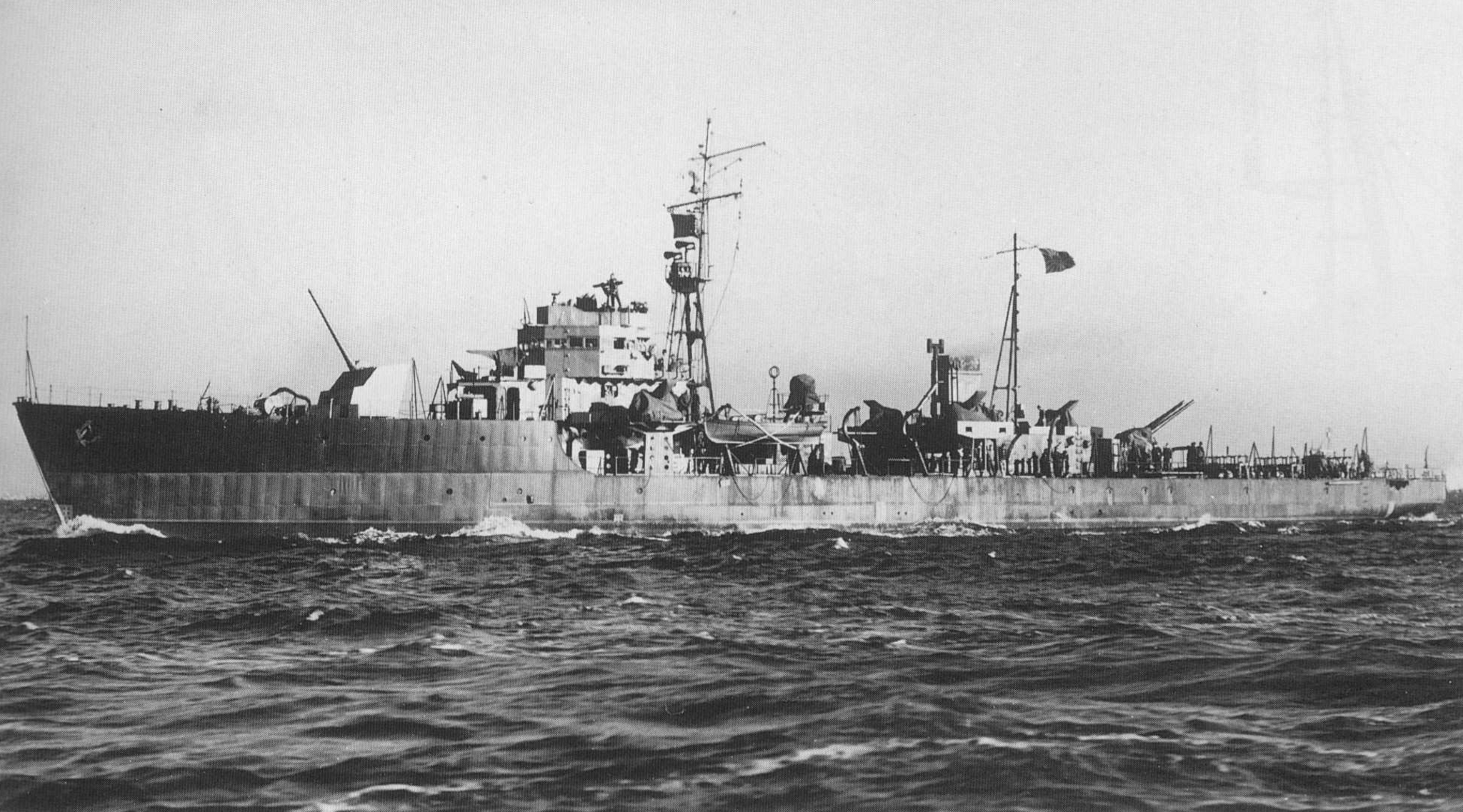
Shisaka in December 1944

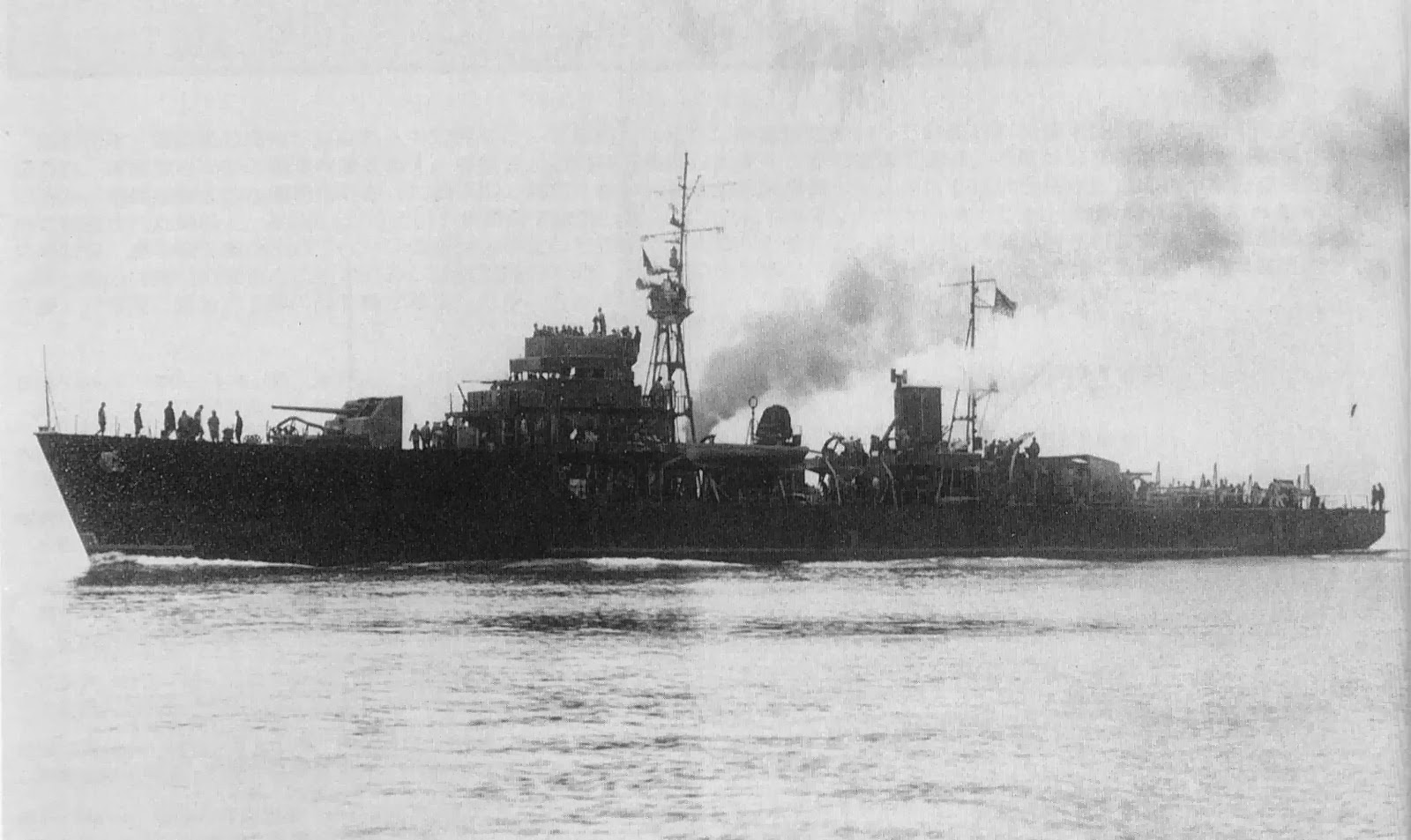
Habuto in April 1945

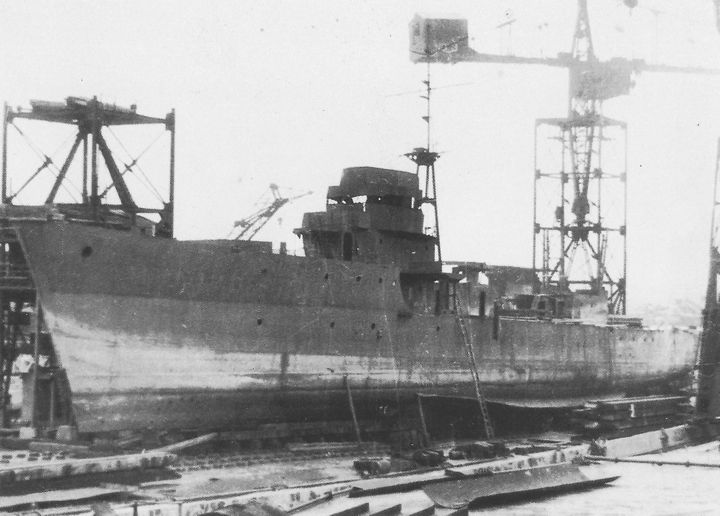
Ōtsu in 1945

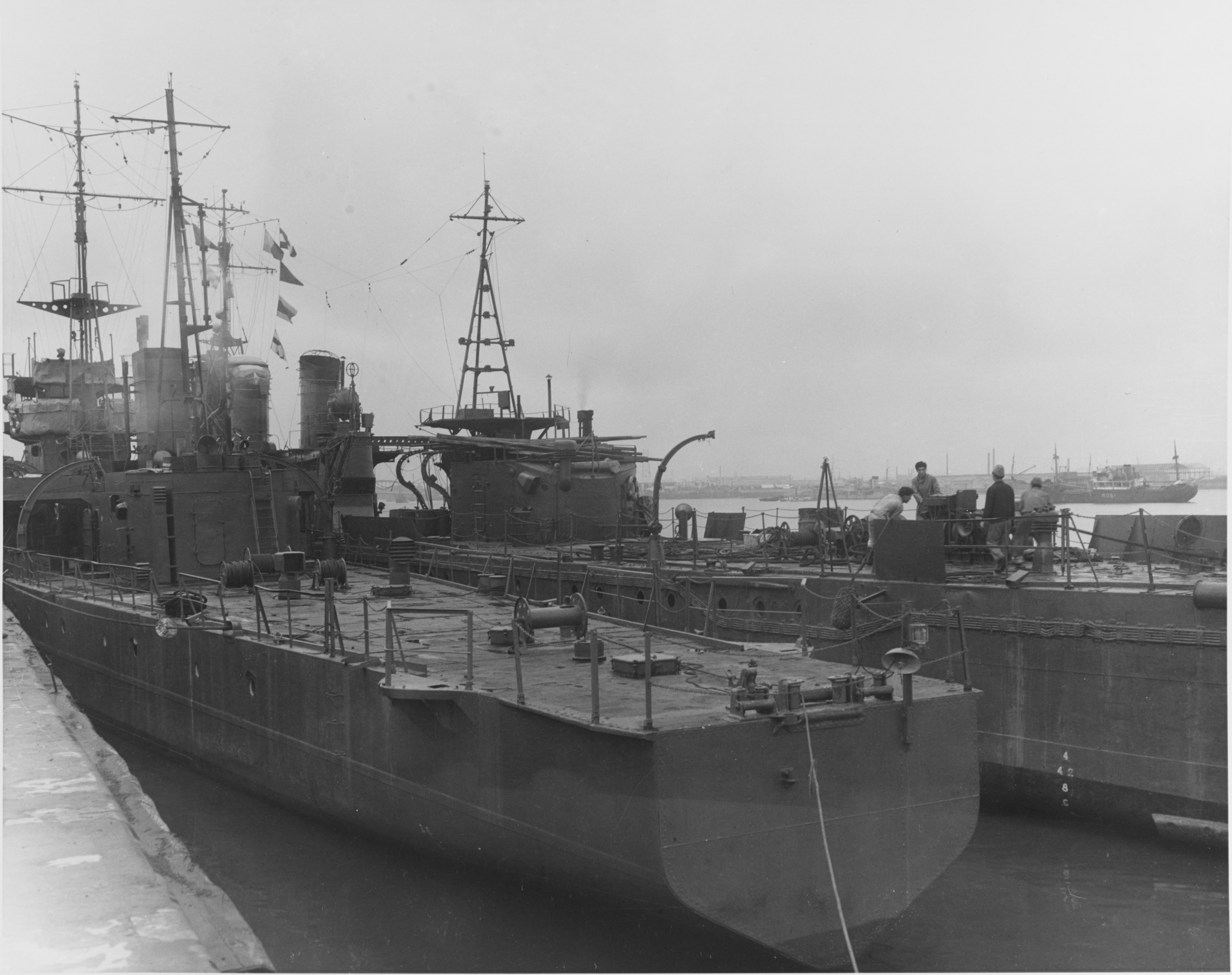
Disarmed Shisaka (left) and Yukikaze in Tokyo, after they were used to repatriate Japanese nationals from overseas, May 1947

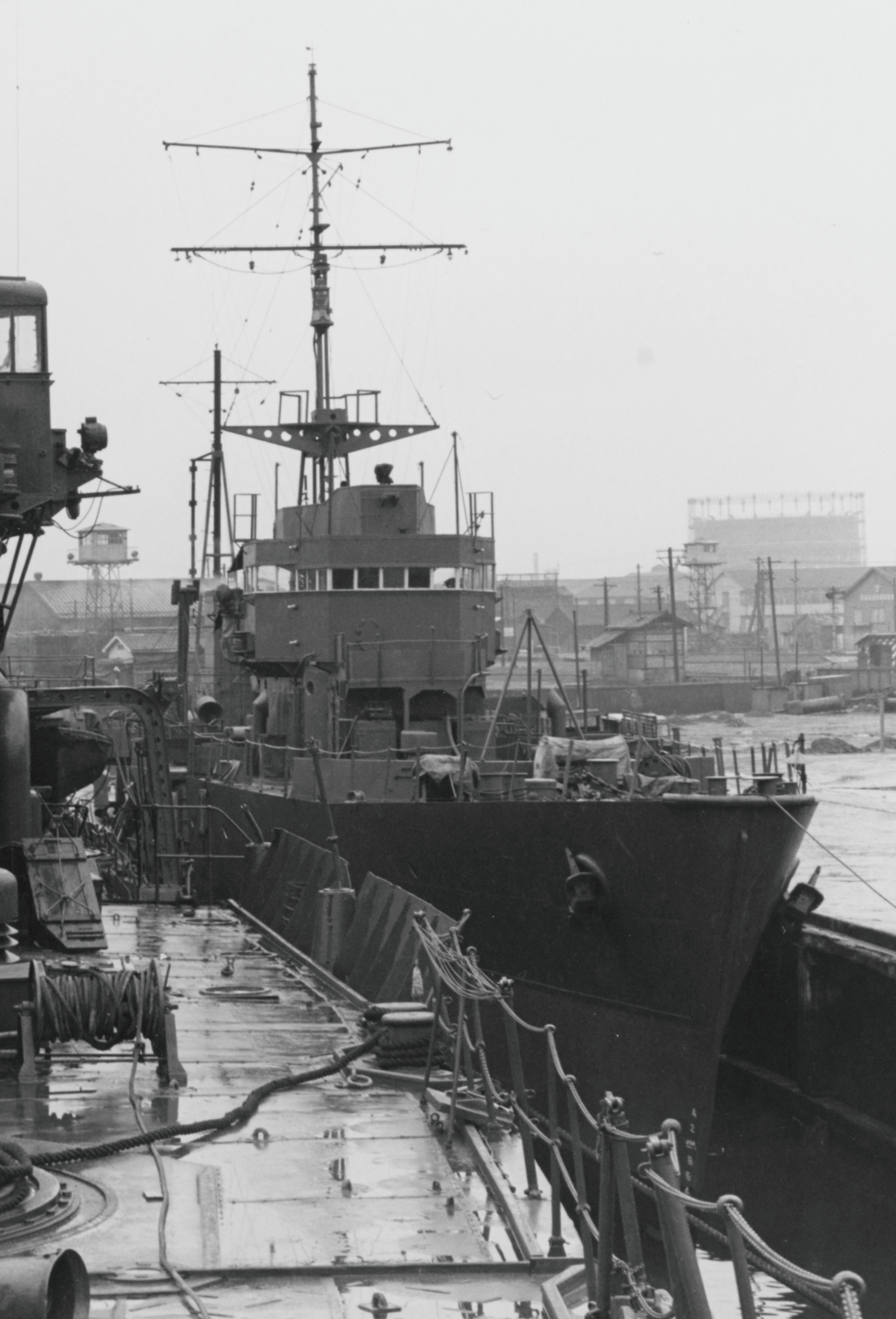
Shisaka in May 1947

== See also ==
- Shimushu-class escort ship
- Etorofu-class escort ship
- Mikura-class escort ship
- Ukuru-class escort ship
- Type C escort ship
- Type D escort ship
- Destroyer escort
- Tacoma-class frigate
- Flower-class corvette

== Bibliography ==
- "Rekishi Gunzō"., History of Pacific War Vol.51, The truth histories of the Imperial Japanese Vessels Part.2, Gakken (Japan), June 2002, ISBN 4-05-602780-3
- Ships of the World special issue Vol.45, Escort Vessels of the Imperial Japanese Navy, "Kaijinsha"., (Japan), February 1996
- Model Art Extra No.340, Drawings of Imperial Japanese Naval Vessels Part-1, "Model Art Co. Ltd". (Japan), October 1989
- The Maru Special, Japanese Naval Vessels No.28, Japanese escort ships, "Ushio Shobō". (Japan), June 1979
