= Japanese escort ship Kanawa =

Imperial Japanese escort ship

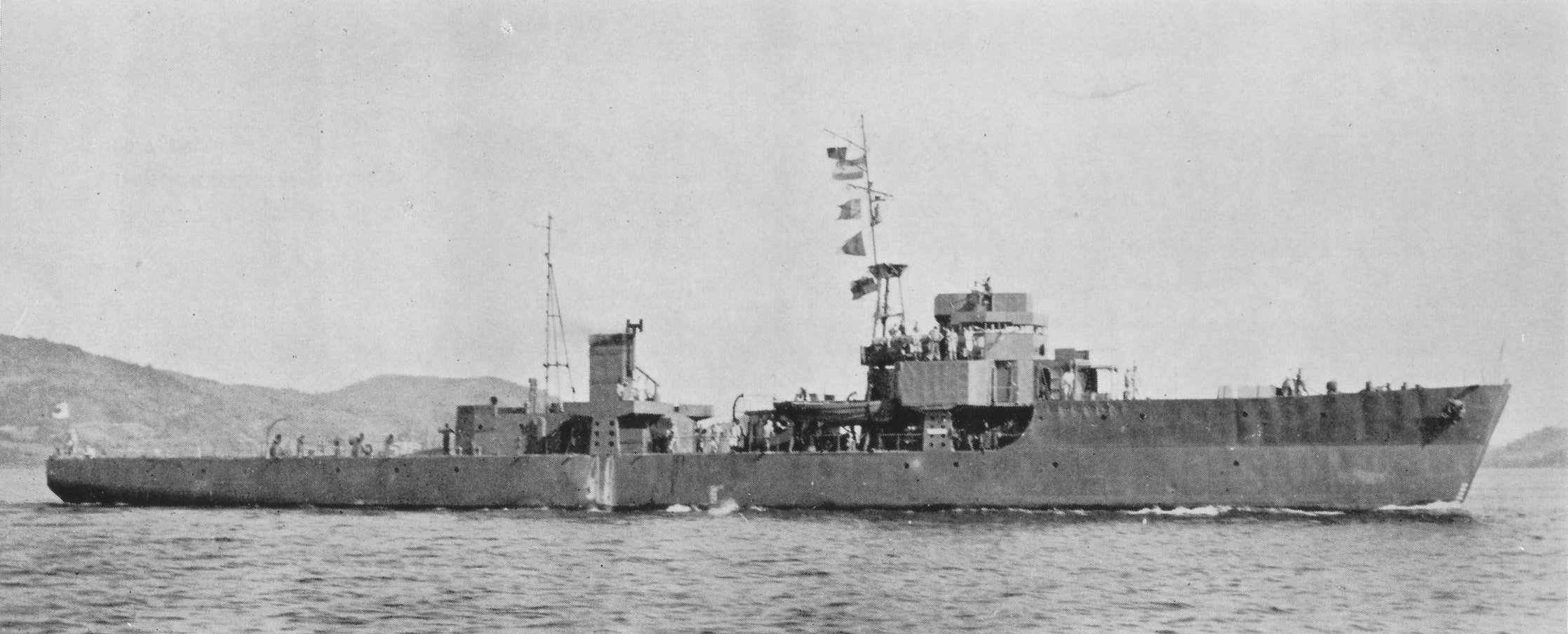

History

Japan
- Name: Kanawa
- Builder: Mitsui Shipbuilding, Tamano
- Laid down: 15 November 1944
- Launched: 20 January 1945
- Commissioned: 15 March 1945
- Fate: Scrapped 1947

General characteristics
- Displacement: 940 tons
- Length: 78,8 meters
- Beam: 9 meters
- Draught: 3 meters
- Propulsion: diesels, 4200 bhp
- Speed: 19,5 knots
- Complement: 150
- Armament: 3 × 120 mm (4.7 in)/45; 6 × 25mm Type AA guns; depth charges

Kanawa was an Ukuru-class escort ship ("Kaibokan") of the Imperial Japanese Navy during the Second World War. After the war Kanawa was used in repatriation service. She was then taken by the British and scrapped in 1947 at Singapore.
