= USS Aaron Ward (DD-483) =

Gleaves-class destroyer of the United States Navy

Coordinates: 9°10′30″S 160°12′0″E

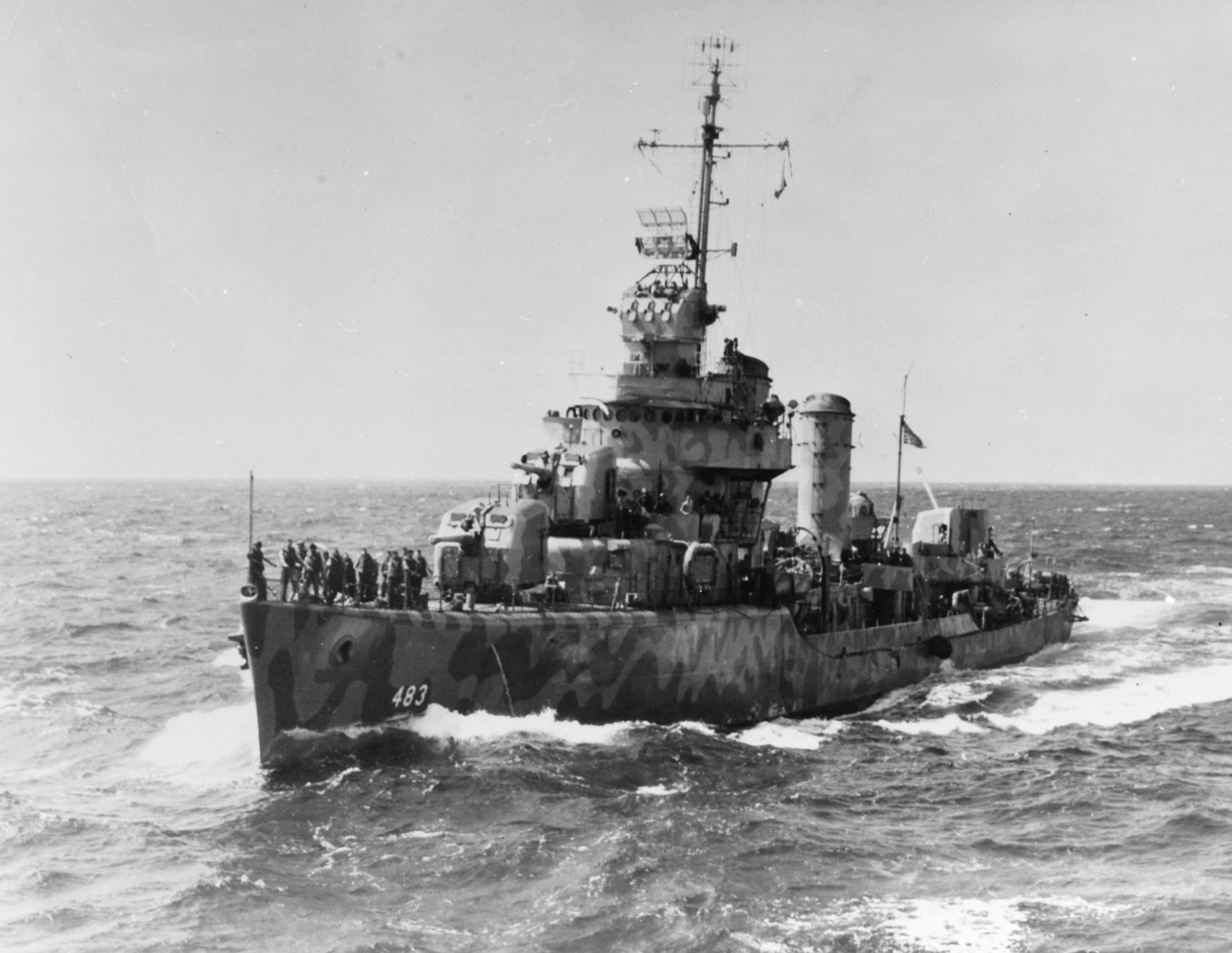
- USS Aaron Ward approaching USS Wasp on 17 August 1942, during operations in the Solomon Islands area.

History

United States
- Name: USS Aaron Ward
- Namesake: Aaron Ward
- Builder: Federal Shipbuilding and Drydock Company
- Laid down: 11 February 1941
- Launched: 22 November 1941
- Commissioned: 4 March 1942
- Fate: Sunk by Japanese aircraft off Guadalcanal 7 April 1943

General characteristics
- Class & type: Gleaves-class destroyer
- Displacement: 2,060 tons (2,090 t)
- Length: 348 ft 4 in (106.17 m)
- Beam: 36 ft 1 in (11.00 m)
- Draft: 13 ft 6 in (4.11 m)
- Propulsion: 50,000 shp (37,000 kW); 4 boilers; 2 propellers
- Speed: 35 knots (65 km/h)
- Range: 6,500 nmi (12,000 km; 7,500 mi) at 12 kn (22 km/h; 14 mph)
- Complement: 208
- Armament: 4 × 5 in (127 mm) DP guns, 6 × 0.50 in (12.7 mm) guns, 4 × 40 mm AA guns; 5 × 20 mm AA guns; 5 × 21 in (533 mm) torpedo tubes; 6 × depth charge projectors, 2 × depth charge tracks

USS Aaron Ward (DD-483) was a Gleaves-class destroyer in the service of the United States Navy. She was the second Navy ship named in honor of Rear Admiral Aaron Ward. She sank on 7 April 1943, in a shoal near Tinete Point of Nggela Sule, Solomon Islands, during Operation I-Go. Her wreck was discovered on 4 September 1994.

== Construction ==
Aaron Ward was laid down on 11 February 1941 at Kearny, New Jersey, by the Federal Shipbuilding and Drydock Company and launched on 22 November 1941, sponsored by Miss Hilda Ward, the daughter of the late Admiral Ward. The ship was commissioned on 4 March 1942.

== Service history ==
Following her shakedown cruise out of Casco Bay, Maine, and postshakedown availability at the New York Navy Yard, Aaron Ward sailed for the Pacific on 20 May 1942 and proceeded via the Panama Canal to San Diego. A short time later, as the Battle of Midway was developing off to the west, the destroyer operated in the screen of Vice Admiral William S. Pye's Task Force 1, built around four battleships and an escort carrier, Long Island, as it steamed out into the Pacific Ocean – eventually reaching a point some 1,200 miles (2,200 km) west of San Francisco, California and equally northeast of Hawaii – to "support the current operations against the enemy." With the detachment of Long Island from the task force on 17 June, Aaron Ward screened her on her voyage back to San Diego.

=== World War II ===
After local operations off the West Coast, Aaron Ward sailed for Hawaii on 30 June 1942 and then to the Tonga Islands with Task Force 18. Assigned to escort duties soon afterwards, she convoyed the oiler USS Cimarron (AO-22) to Nouméa. During the course of the voyage, she made two sound contacts, one on 5 August and the other the following day, which she developed and attacked with depth charges. Although she claimed a probable sinking in each case, neither kill was borne out in postwar accounting. Subsequently assigned to screening duties with forces seeking to cover and resupply Guadalcanal, Aaron Ward saw the fleet carrier USS Wasp (CV-7) torpedoed by I-19 on 15 September 1942.

Within a month's time, Aaron Ward was earmarked for a shore bombardment mission on 17 October. She stood into Lunga Roads to lie to and await the arrival of a Marine liaison officer who would designate targets for the ship. Before she could embark passengers, though, she spotted five enemy bombers approaching from the west. These attacked Aaron Ward, but ran into a heavy antiaircraft barrage from both the ship and marine guns on shore. The destroyer went ahead at flank speed when she spotted the attackers, to carry out evasive maneuvers and avoid the falling bombs, radically swinging to the right or left as the occasion demanded. Three bombs splashed 100 to 300 yards (91 to 274 m) astern of the ship. The Marines claimed two of the five attackers destroyed, while the ship and the Marines shared a third kill.

The action over, the destroyer embarked Martin Clemens, the former British consular representative on Guadalcanal, Major C. M. Nees, USMC, and Corporal R. M. Howard, USMC, a photographer, and got underway soon afterwards, reaching her target area within 40 minutes. For three hours, Aaron Ward shelled Japanese shore positions, her targets ranging from a gun emplacement to ammunition dumps; fires, smoke, and explosions marked her visit as she quit the area. Reaching Lunga Roads, she disembarked her passengers and after going on alert for a Japanese air raid that failed to materialize, cleared Lengo Channel and rejoined her task force.

Three days later, while again performing screening operations, Aaron Ward saw the cruiser Chester take a torpedo hit on 20 October from I-176. The destroyer went to the aid of the stricken cruiser and dropped a full depth-charge pattern on Chester's assailant, but did not record a kill. She then escorted the damaged cruiser to Espiritu Santo.

Ten days after this, Aaron Ward carried out another bombardment of Japanese positions on Guadalcanal, this time in company with the light cruiser Atlanta, flagship of Rear Admiral Norman Scott, and destroyers Benham, Fletcher, and Lardner. Arriving off Lunga Point at 0520 on 30 October, the task group stood in, and Atlanta embarked a liaison officer from Major General Alexander A. Vandegrift, commander of the 1st Marine Division, 20 minutes later.

Steaming to its designated area, the task group reached its destination within an hour, and Atlanta opened fire. Aaron Ward followed suit soon afterwards; eventually, she expended 711 rounds of 5-inch ammunition. Pausing briefly to investigate a reported submarine in the vicinity, she then cleared the area.

==== Naval Battle of Guadalcanal, 13 November 1942 ====
Aaron Ward screened transports unloading men and material off Guadalcanal on 11 and 12 November, shooting down one enemy plane and damaging two others on the former day and two more planes off Lunga Point on the latter. The Allies learned that the Japanese were sending a large force to disrupt air operations based at Henderson Field and land reinforcements for the Japanese forces on the island. The resulting Naval Battle of Guadalcanal proved to be the climactic engagement of the Guadalcanal campaign.

On the evening of 12 November, Aaron Ward retired with her task force – five cruisers and eight destroyers under Rear Admiral Daniel J. Callaghan – in an eastward direction, escorting the transports out of what would become known after the battle as "Ironbottom Sound". Later, the force reversed course and stood back through Lengo Channel. Around 01:25 on 13 November, the American ships that had radar picked up numerous contacts on their screens – the "Volunteer Attack Force" under Rear Admiral Hiroaki Abe, which consisted of battleships Hiei and Kirishima, the light cruiser Nagara, and 14 destroyers.

Aaron Ward, leading the four destroyers bringing up the rear of Callaghan's column, ranged in on the Japanese ships, opening fire soon afterwards on a target she took to be a battleship. A short time later, after the ship had fired about 10 salvos, she saw that the cruisers ahead of her had apparently changed course; Aaron Ward observed two torpedoes pass beneath her.

An instant later, Barton blew up, torpedoed by Amatsukaze. Aaron Ward, with the waters clear ahead of her, surged ahead once more. She prepared to fire torpedoes at a target to port, but did not because she sighted a ship which she took to be San Francisco 1,500 yards (1,400 m) away. Observing what she took to be Sterett heading directly toward her port side, Aaron Ward put her rudder over hard to port to avoid a collision.

A short time later, the destroyer commenced firing on an enemy ship and hurled some 25 salvos in her direction; her target may have been Akatsuki, which did blow up and sink, with very heavy loss of life. Changing course to bear on a new target in the melee, Aaron Ward managed to get off four salvos on director control until a Japanese shell put the director out of action and forced the destroyer's gunners to rely on local control.

In the minutes that followed, Aaron Ward received eight more direct hits; unable to identify friend from foe and certain that the enemy had surely established her American character, the destroyer then stood out to clear the area. She lost steering control at 02:25, and steering with her engines, she attempted to come to the right. Seeing no more firing after 02:30, when the battle apparently ended, Aaron Ward went dead in the water at 02:35, her forward engine room flooded with saltwater and her feedwater gone.

Using a gasoline pump, the destroyer's crew managed to pump saltwater into the tanks and light the boilers off. At 05:00, Aaron Ward moved slowly ahead, bound for Sealark Channel; 10 minutes later, American motor torpedo boats closed, and the destroyer signaled them to ask Tulagi for a tug. She kept up her crawling pace for only a half-hour before going dead in the water again.

About 30 minutes after she had slowed to a stop, Aaron Ward spotted the Japanese battleship Hiei steaming slowly in circles between Savo and Florida Islands. Also nearby, nearer to Guadalcanal, lay Atlanta, Portland, Cushing, and Monssen, all damaged, and the destroyers both burning. The destroyer Yūdachi's presence in the vicinity proved to be her own undoing: Portland summarily sank her.

Aaron Ward, perhaps prompted to do so with more urgency due to Hiei's proximity, got underway at 06:18, and two minutes later greeted tug Bobolink, which had arrived to take the destroyer in tow. Before the towline could be rigged, Hiei spotted Aaron Ward and opened fire with her heavy guns. Four two-gun salvos were laid, the third of which straddled the crippled destroyer. However, planes sent from Henderson Field began attacking Hiei, distracting her from further fire.

Losing power again at 06:35, Aaron Ward was taken in tow by Bobolink, and the ships began moving toward safety. The tug turned the tow over to a local patrol boat at 06:50, and the destroyer anchored in Tulagi Harbor near Makambo Island at 08:30. The nine direct hits she had received resulted in 15 men dead and 57 wounded. After receiving temporary repairs locally, Aaron Ward sailed for Hawaii soon afterwards, reaching Pearl Harbor on 20 December 1942 for permanent repairs.

The Aaron Ward gave another fine example of the fighting spirit of the men of our destroyer force. Though hit nine times by both major and medium caliber shells, which caused extensive damage, she nevertheless avoided total destruction by the apparently superhuman efforts of all hands. The superb performance of the engineers' force in effecting temporary repairs so that the ship could move away from under the guns of the enemy battle ship largely contributed to saving the ship.

— Admiral William F. Halsey, Commander, South Pacific Forces

The destroyer rejoined the fleet on 6 February 1943 and soon resumed escort work. During one stint with a small convoy on 20 March, she aided in driving off attacking Japanese planes. On 7 April, she had escorted USS Ward (APD-16) and three tank landing craft (LCTs) from the Russell Islands to Savo. Not expecting to arrive until 14:00, the destroyer went ahead at 25 knots (46 km/h) to provide USS Ward and the three LCTs with air cover until they reached Tulagi. Around noon, the destroyer received notification of an impending air raid at Guadalcanal.

==== Sinking ====
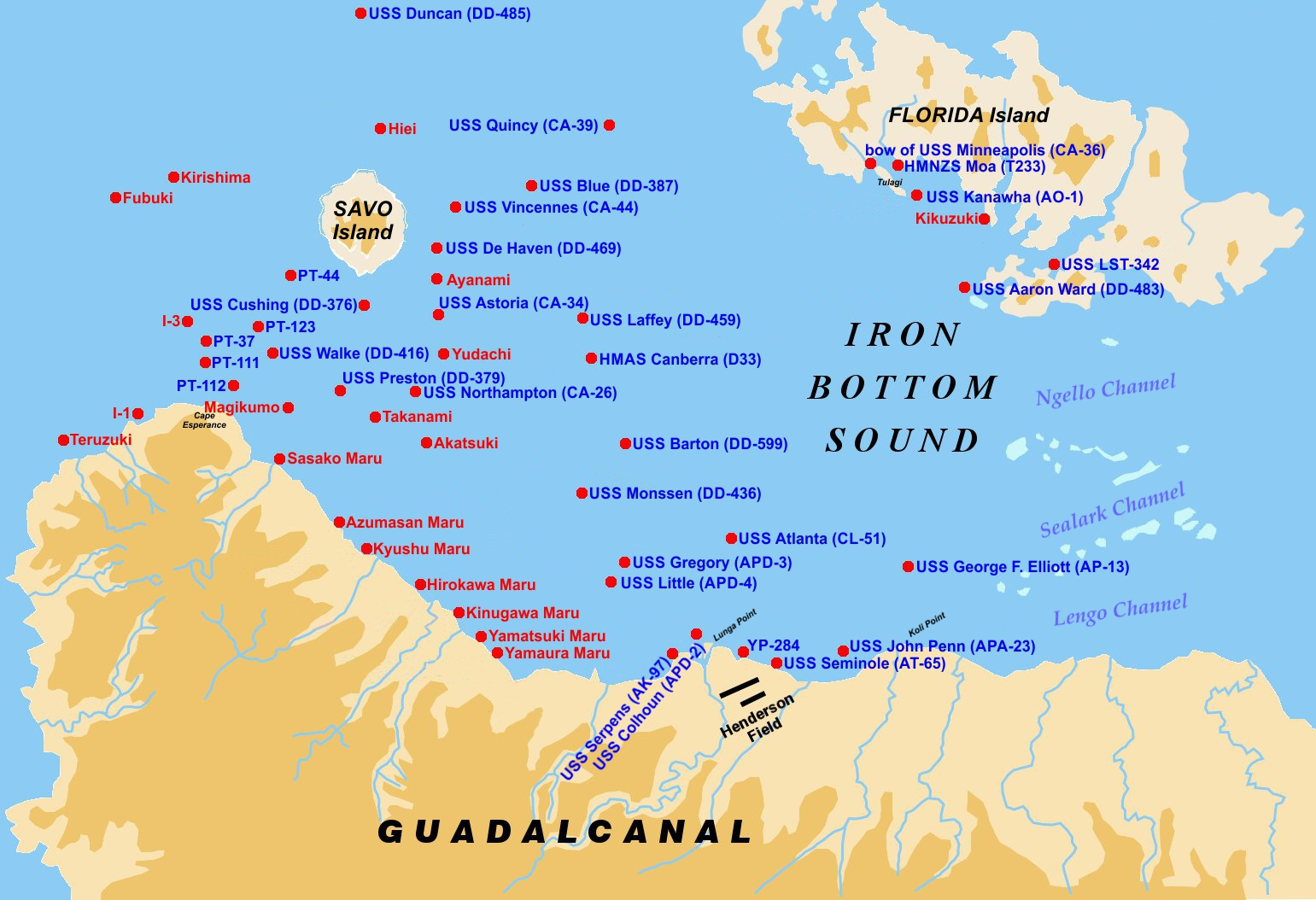
Aaron Ward is off the south coast of Florida Island

As the ships neared their destination, Aaron Ward received orders around 13:30 to leave her convoy to cover LST-449 off Togoma Point, Guadalcanal. (One of the passengers on LST-449 was then-Lieutenant (junior grade) John F. Kennedy, later to become President of the United States, on his way to take command of PT-109.) Joining LST-449 at 14:19, the destroyer directed her to follow her movements and zigzag at the approach of enemy aircraft. While the LST maneuvered to conform to Aaron Ward's movements, Lieutenant Commander Frederick J. Becton, commanding officer of Aaron Ward, planned to retire to the eastward through Lengo Channel, as other cargo ships and escorting ships were doing upon receipt of the air-raid warning from Guadalcanal.

Sighting a dogfight over Savo Island, Aaron Ward tracked a closer group of Japanese planes heading south over Tulagi; while swinging to starboard, the ship suddenly sighted three enemy planes coming out of the sun. Surging ahead to flank speed and putting her rudder over hard to port, Aaron Ward opened fire with her 20 mm and 40 mm guns, followed shortly afterwards by her 5-inch battery. Bombs from the first three planes struck on or near the ship, and the mining effect of the near-misses proved devastating; the first bomb was a near miss, which tore holes in the side of the ship, allowing the forward fire room to take on water rapidly; the second struck home in the engine room, causing a loss of all electrical power on the 5 inch and 40 mm mounts. Shifting to local control, however, the gunners kept up the fire. A third bomb splashed close aboard, holing her port side, near the after engine room. Having lost power to her rudder, the ship continued to swing to port as another trio of dive bombers loosed their loads on the now-helpless destroyer. While none of these bombs hit the ship, two landed very near her port side. Twenty men died, 59 were wounded, and seven went missing.

Despite the best efforts of her determined crew, and the assistance of Ortolan and Vireo, the destroyer settled lower in the water. When the battle to save Aaron Ward became apparent as being lost, Ortolan and Vireo attempted to beach her on a shoal near Tinete Point of Nggela Sule. At 21:35, however, Aaron Ward sank, stern first, in 40 fathoms (70 m) of water, only 600 yards (550 m) from shoal water.

== Discovery ==
On 4 September 1994, divers located the wreck of Aaron Ward. The first dive to the wreck was made on 25 September 1994. Because of the depth, divers were limited to about 15 minutes at the wreck before beginning their return to the surface.

== Awards ==
Aaron Ward was awarded four battle stars for her World War II service.
