= Ngela =

Ngela or Ngggela may refer to:

- Guela, Republic of the Congo, also known as Ngela
- Nggela Islands, also known as the Florida Islands, a small island group in the Central Province of Solomon Islands in the southwest Pacific Ocean
- Nggela Channel, one of the waterways between the Nggela Islands and Taivu Point on the northeast side of Guadalcanal
