= Guelpa =

Guelpa is a surname. Notable people with the name include:

- Christophe Guelpa (born 1963), French Olympic sport shooter
- Guillaume Guelpa (1850–1930), French doctor, born in Italy
- Irène Guelpa, French socialist activist
- Robert Guelpa, French rower

== See also ==
- Guela (disambiguation)
