= USS Monssen (DD-436) =

Gleaves-class destroyer

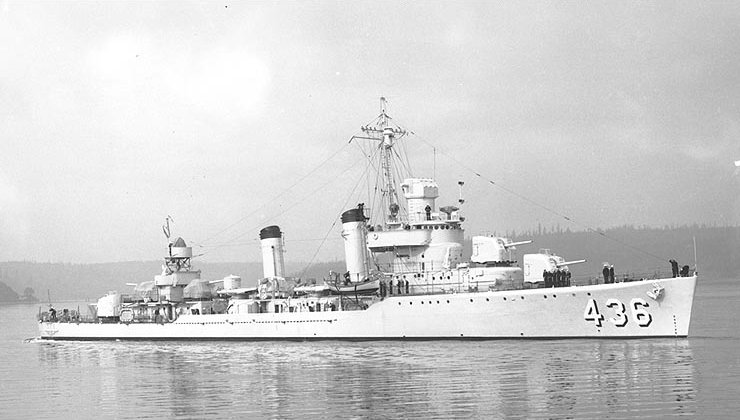
- USS Monssen (DD-436)

History

United States
- Name: Monssen
- Namesake: Mons Monssen
- Builder: Puget Sound Navy Yard
- Laid down: 12 July 1939
- Launched: 16 May 1940
- Commissioned: 14 March 1941
- Honours and awards: 4 × battle stars
- Fate: Sunk by Japanese warships off Guadalcanal 13 November 1942

General characteristics
- Class & type: Gleaves-class destroyer
- Displacement: 1,630 tons
- Length: 348 ft 3 in (106.15 m)
- Beam: 36 ft 1 in (11.00 m)
- Draft: 11 ft 10 in (3.61 m)
- Propulsion: 50,000 shp (37,000 kW); 4 boilers; 2 propellers
- Speed: 37.4 knots (69 km/h)
- Range: 6,500 nmi (12,000 km; 7,500 mi) at 12 kn (22 km/h; 14 mph)
- Complement: 16 officers, 260 enlisted
- Armament: 5 × 5 in (127 mm) DP guns, 6 × 0.5 in (12.7 mm) guns, 6 × 20 mm AA guns, 10 × 21 in (533 mm) torpedo tubes, 2 × depth charge tracks

USS Monssen (DD-436), a Gleaves-class destroyer, was the first ship of the United States Navy to be named for Mons Monssen, who was awarded the Medal of Honor for his actions aboard USS Missouri (BB-11) in 1904. Commissioned in 1941, the destroyer saw service during World War II in both Atlantic and Pacific Oceans. Monssen was sunk at the Naval Battle of Guadalcanal on 13 November 1942.

== Construction and commissioning ==
Monssen was laid down on 12 July 1939 by Puget Sound Navy Yard at Bremerton, Washington and launched on 16 May 1940, sponsored by Mrs. Mons Monssen, widow of Lieutenant Monssen. The ship was commissioned on 14 March 1941, Lieutenant Commander Roland N. Smoot in command.

== Service history ==
=== June 1941–February 1942 ===
Following shakedown and training, Monssen reported to the Atlantic Fleet on 27 June 1941 as a unit of Destroyer Division 22 (DesDiv 22). For the next five months she operated in the northwestern Atlantic, from the coast of New England and the Maritime Provinces to Iceland, on neutrality patrol. Her escort and patrol duties changed from neutral to belligerent 7 December 1941, continuing until 9 February 1942 when she entered the Boston Navy Yard for overhaul in preparation for her transfer to the Pacific Fleet.

=== Transfer to the Pacific ===
On 31 March Monssen arrived at San Francisco, joined Task Force 16 (TF 16), and departed 2 April. Steaming west, she was in the antisubmarine screen for the aircraft carrier Hornet as the carrier headed for Japan with Lt. Col. Jimmy Doolittle's B-25s on her flight deck. In the early morning hours of 18 April the force was sighted by the enemy and the air raid was launched to bomb their targets of Tokyo, Nagoya, Osaka, and Kobe.

Following the Doolittle Raid, the force returned to Pearl Harbor, from which it sortied 30 April to aid the carriersYorktown and Lexington in the Battle of the Coral Sea. Reaching the scene after the battle was over, the force returned to Pearl Harbor, arriving on 26 May. Two days later they departed again — this time for Midway to repulse an expected assault on that advanced base. By 2 June, TF 16 had rendezvoused with Task Force 17 (TF 17) and was in position 350 miles (560 km) northeast of Midway. On 4 June the Battle of Midway commenced as Japanese aircraft flew against installations on the island. By 7 June, the American forces had won the battle, sinking four Japanese aircraft carriers and one cruiser at the cost of the destroyer Hammann and carrier Yorktown.

=== Solomon Islands campaign ===
After Midway the force remained at Pearl Harbor for a month before departing again for combat. Steaming via the Tonga Islands, they headed for the Japanese held Solomons. By 7 August they were 40 miles (64 km) from the targets, Guadalcanal and Tulagi. On 7–8 August, Monssen with Buchanan stood off Gavutu and Tanambogo, circling those islands and providing fire support to units of the 2nd Marine Regiment as the U.S. Navy struck with the first of its giant amphibious assaults. She was then assigned to the screening forces guarding the eastern approaches to Sealark, Lengo, and Nggela Channels.

She remained in the immediate area through the Battle of the Eastern Solomons, which prevented Japanese reinforcements from reaching Guadalcanal, and then took up duties patrolling the sea routes to Guadalcanal. At the end of the month the carrier Saratoga was damaged and Monssen was one of the ships designated to escort her to the Tonga Islands.

=== Sinking at the Naval Battle of Guadalcanal ===
Monssen returned to Guadalcanal 18 September to insure the integrity of an Allied supply line and to block Japanese efforts at resupply. On 8 November, she departed Nouméa with two cruisers and two other destroyers as Task Group 67.4 (TG 67.4), under Rear Admiral Daniel J. Callaghan, as escort for transports carrying reinforcements to the Marines on Guadalcanal. At the same time, another convoy set out from Espiritu Santo, covered by one cruiser and four destroyers under Rear Admiral Norman Scott. Arriving off Lunga Point on 12 November, a day after those from Espiritu Santo they commenced unloading. By dusk as reports of Japanese ship movements from Truk increased, 90 percent of the transports had been unladen despite afternoon torpedo plane attacks, one of which had cost Monssen the use of her fire control radar. The transports were pulled out, escorted through Lengo Channel, and seen safely on their way to Espiritu Santo. Then Admiral Callaghan's force, heavily outnumbered even with the addition of Admiral Scott's ships, reversed course and steamed back to engage the enemy in the initial action of what would later be called the Naval Battle of Guadalcanal.

Shortly, after 01:40, 13 November, they sighted the enemy fleet, under Vice Admiral Hiroaki Abe, 3 miles (4.8 km) north of Kukum. The enemy was headed toward Henderson Field — to bombard it and cripple Allied air operations long enough to sneak in 11 of their transports, then en route to relieve their beleaguered comrades fighting on the island.

Battle was given at 01:50. Monssen fired five torpedoes at the Japanese battleship Hiei at 01:56, with two hitting the Japanese battleship on the port side near the boiler rooms between the forward superstructure and mainmast. Monssen fired a second salvo of five torpedoes at a ship (later identified as the USS Atlanta), but missed with the second salvo of torpedoes. At 02:00, Monssen began firing its guns at Japanese warships. At 02:03, Hiei opened fire on Monssen with both main and secondary batteries. Monssen, forced to rely on radio information and optics, was spotlighted, hit by some 39 shells, including three of battleship caliber, and reduced to a burning hulk. Twenty minutes later, completely immobilized in all departments, the ship was ordered abandoned. After daybreak Monssen was still afire. C. C. Storey, BM2c, L. F. Sturgeon, GM2c, and J. G. Hughes F1c, climbed back into the inferno and rescued eight men still aboard and alive, five of whom lived after reaching land. The survivors, 40 percent of the crew, were picked up at about 08:00 and taken to Guadalcanal. The ship herself continued to blaze until early afternoon, when she sank.

Monssen was awarded four battle stars for World War II service.

== Wreck discovery ==
In 1992, an expedition headed by oceanographer Robert Ballard found the wreck of Monssen and other ships sunk during the Solomon Islands battles. The wreck lies upright on the bottom of the sound, with the gun turrets still trained out to the starboard side as they had been in combat.
