= Guela =

Guela may refer to:

- Guela, Republic of the Congo
- Guela, Guinea, in Nzérékoré Prefecture
