= Guillaume Guelpa =

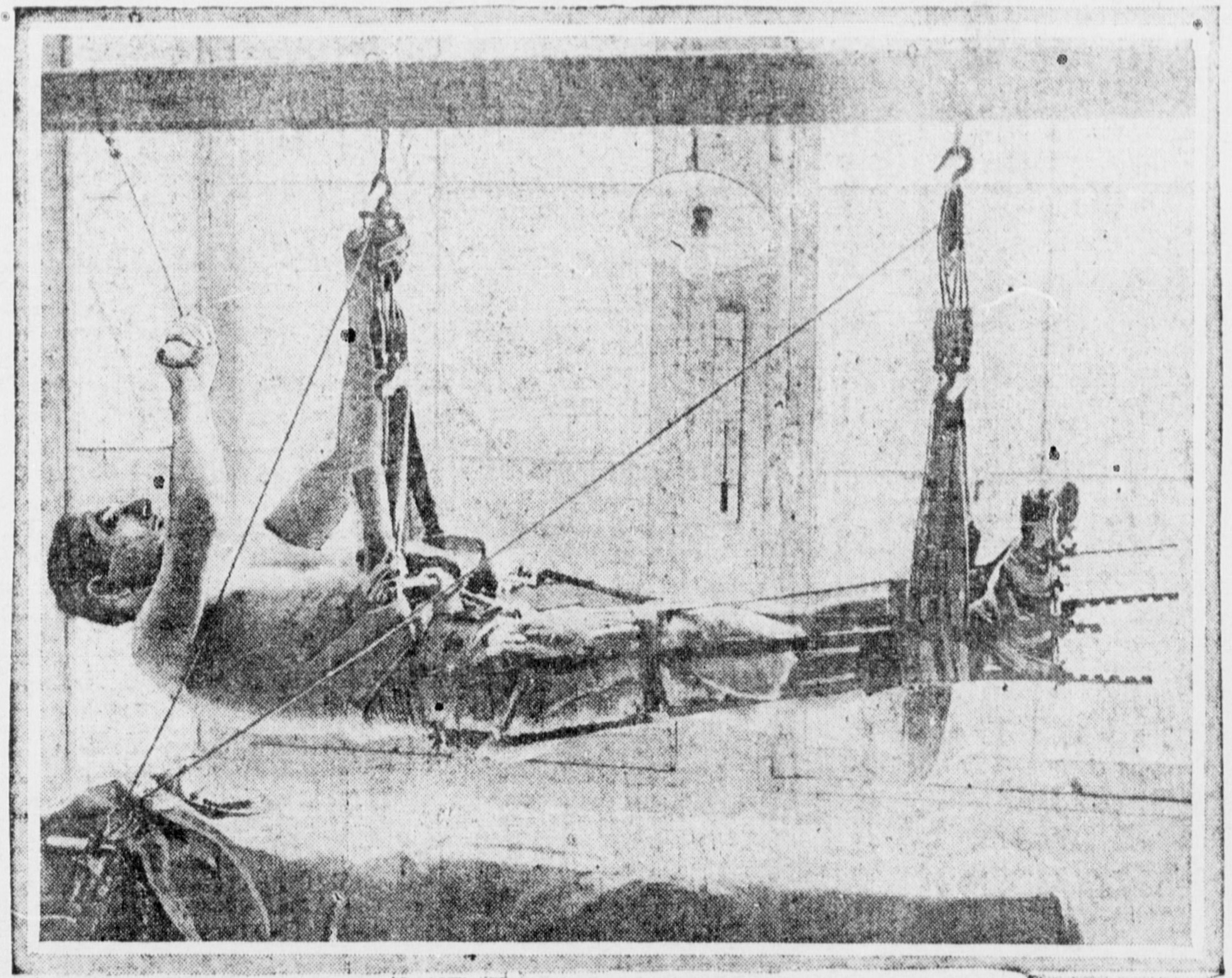
- The medical Rack was invented by William Guelpa during WW1
- Born: 1850; Italy
- Died: 1930 (aged 79–80); France
- Other name: First name published as William or Guglielmo
- Occupation: Physician

Guillaume Guelpa (Note: First name published as William and Guglielmo as well) (1850-1930) was a French medical doctor, born in Italy. He was an important diabetes medical researcher in the days before the invention of insulin in the early 1920s. During the First World War he invented the medical rack for treatment of all fractures complicated with gangrene.

== Works ==
- Guelpa, Guillaume. Hygiène alimentaire et travail cérébral (in French). - Total pages: 824
- Guelpa, Guillaume (1899). Le Crachoir de poche (in French). Impr. Paul Dupont. - Total pages: 4
- Guelpa, Guillaume (1910). La guérison du diabète (in French). impr. de Daix frères et Thiron. - Total pages: 28
- Guelpa, Guillaume (1913). La Méthode Guelpa : désintoxication de l'organisme (in French). Doin. - Total pages: 340
- Guelpa, Guillaume; Arnold, Francis Sorell (1914). Auto-intoxication and Disintoxication: An Account of a New Fasting Treatment in Diabetes and Other Chronic Diseases. Rebman. - Total pages: 152
- Guelpa, Guillaume (1919). Digiuno e purga: loro applicazioni scientifiche : rinnovamento dei tessuti e ringiovanimento delle funzioni; Canizie e calvizie ed igiene dei capelli Libri della salute / Quintieri (in French). Quintieri. - Total pages: 129

== Journal articles ==
- Guelpa, G; Marie, A (1911). "La lutte contre l'epilepsie par la desintoxication et par la reeducation alimentaire" [The fight against epilepsy by detoxification and by the reeducation about food]. Rev Ther Med-Chirurg. 78 (1): 8–13.

== Bibliography ==
Notes

References

- Stefan, Hermann; Theodore, William H. (2012). Epilepsy, Part II: Treatment. Newnes. ISBN 9780444535061. - Total pages: 608
- Tattersall, Robert (2009). Diabetes: The Biography. OUP Oxford. ISBN 9780199541362. - Total pages: 229
- "Aparatus [sic] for fractured limbs in Paris Hospital". Tulsa Daily World. Tulsa, Oklahoma: J.R. Brady. April 20, 1915. pp. 1–10. ISSN 2330-7234. OCLC 4450824.
