= Nggela Channel =

Waterway in the Solomon Islands

Coordinates: 9.243°S 160.316°E

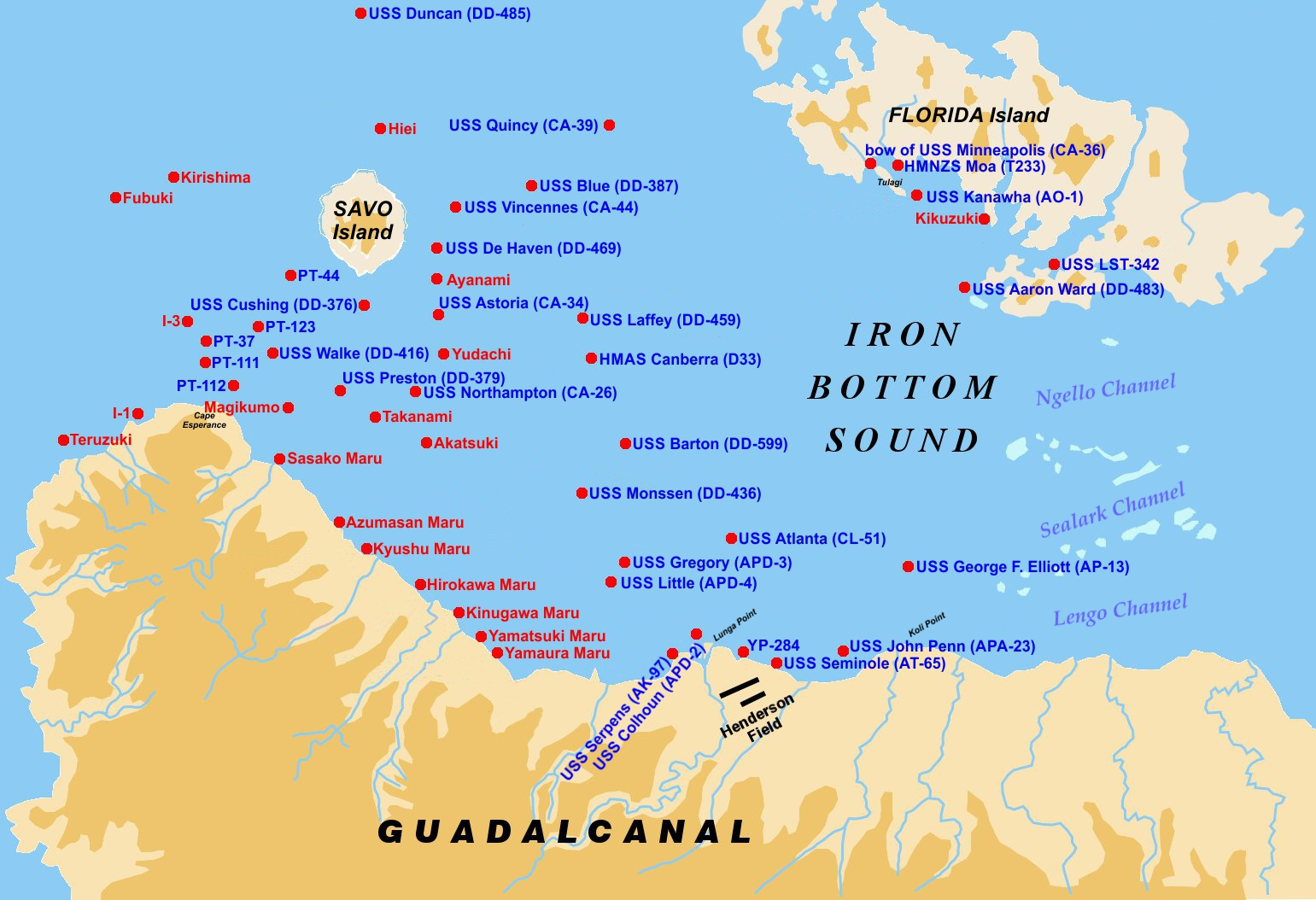
Chart of Ironbottom Sound and surrounding waters and islands.

In the Solomon Islands, the waters between the Florida Islands and Taivu Point on the northeast of Guadalcanal are divided by reefs into (from north to south) Nggela Channel, Sealark Channel and Lengo Channel. They connect Ironbottom Sound to the west with Indispensable Strait to the east.
