= Guela, Republic of the Congo =

Town in the Republic of the Congo

Guela, also known as Ngela, Guéla, or Ngéla, is a town of the Republic of the Congo with about 4000 inhabitants.
