= Lengo Channel =

Coordinates: 9.387°S 160.307°E

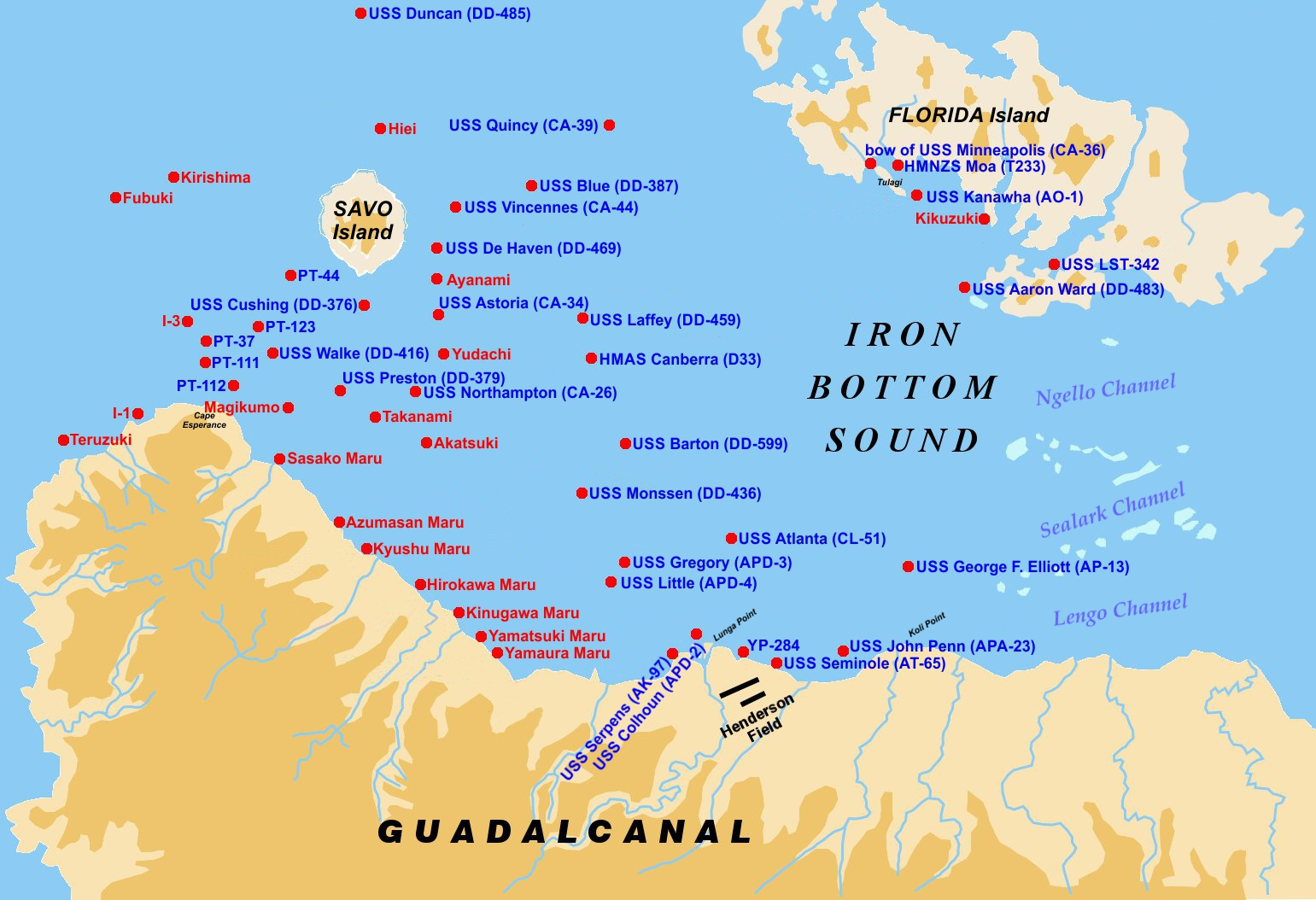
Chart of Ironbottom Sound and surrounding waters and islands.

In the Solomon Islands, the waters between the Florida Islands and Taivu Point on the northeast of Guadalcanal are divided by reefs into (from north to south) Nggela Channel, Sealark Channel, and Lengo Channel. They connect Ironbottom Sound to the west with Indispensable Strait to the east.

The Lengo Channel is navigatable by large ships and was traversed by Task Force 67 (TF67) during the Battle of Tassafaronga and by other ships during the Guadalcanal Campaign.

== Notes ==
Citations

References

- Brown, Herbert C. (2000). Hell at Tassafaronga. Ancient Mariners Pr. ISBN 0-9700721-4-7.
- Crenshaw, Russell S. Jr. (1995). The Battle of Tassafaronga. Nautical & Aviation Publishing Company of America. ISBN 1-877853-37-2.
- Morison, Samuel Eliot (1958). "Chapter 13: The Battle of Tassafaronga". The Struggle for Guadalcanal, August 1942 – February 1943, vol. 5 of History of United States Naval Operations in World War II. Boston: Little, Brown and Company. ISBN 0-316-58305-7.
