= Tameichi Hara =

Japanese naval commander (1900–1980)

- 原 為一
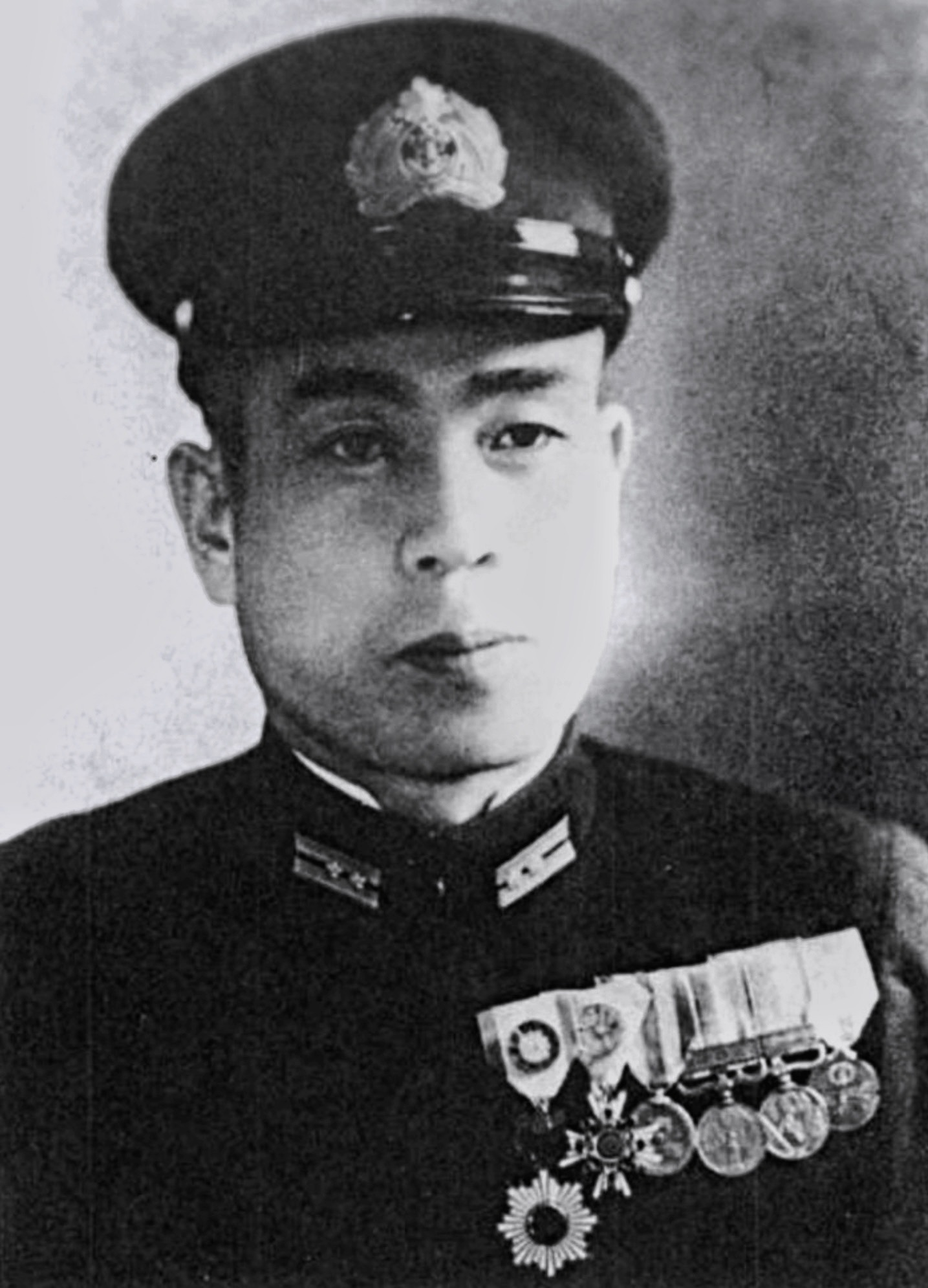
- Born: October 16, 1900; Kagawa, Japan
- Died: October 10, 1980 (aged 79)
- Military career
- Allegiance: Empire of Japan
- Branch: Imperial Japanese Navy
- Service years: 1921–1945
- Rank: Captain
- Commands: Yūnagi, Nagatsuki, Amagiri, Yamagumo, Natsugumo, Ayanami, Amatsukaze, 19th Destroyer Division, 27th Destroyer Division, Yahagi
- Conflicts: World War II; Pacific War; Battle of the Java Sea; Battle of Midway; Battle of the Eastern Solomons; Battle of the Santa Cruz Islands; Naval Battle of Guadalcanal; Battle of Vella Gulf; Battle off Horaniu; Naval Battle of Vella Lavella; Battle of Empress Augusta Bay; Operation Ten-Go

Tameichi Hara (原 為一, Hara Tameichi; October 16, 1900 – October 10, 1980) was an Imperial Japanese naval commander during the Pacific War and the author of the IJN manual on torpedo attack techniques, notable for his skill in torpedo warfare and night fighting. Hara was the only IJN destroyer captain at the start of World War II to survive the entire war and his memoirs serve as an important source for historians.

== Early life ==
Hara was born on October 16, 1900, in a suburb of Takamatsu City on the island of Shikoku. A native of Kagawa Prefecture and of samurai descent, Hara graduated with the 49th class from the Imperial Japanese Naval Academy at Etajima in 1921. In 1932 Hara was assigned as a surface warfare instructor and wrote a torpedo attack manual that was accepted as official doctrine. He began the war as the captain of destroyer Amatsukaze.

== Military career ==
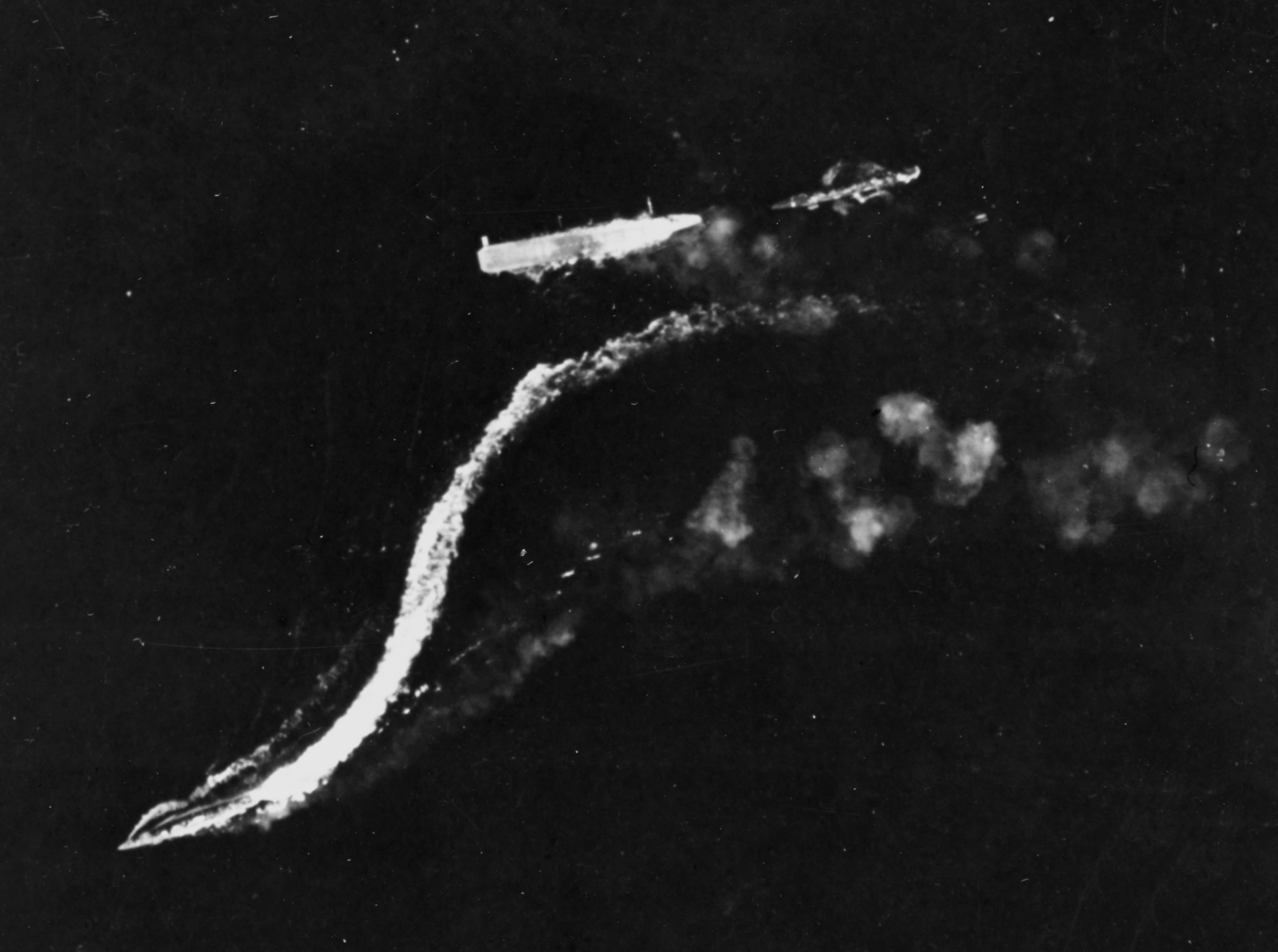
Amatsukaze (center bottom), under Hara's command, maneuvers at high speed to evade a high-level bomb attack by B-17 bombers on the disabled Japanese aircraft carrier Ryūjō (center right) during the Battle of the Eastern Solomons.

Hara commanded a Japanese destroyer or destroyer division in many significant Pacific sea battles. As captain of the Amatsukaze Commander Hara participated in the Battle of the Java Sea, the capturing of the hospital ship SS Op Ten Noort and the sinking of the submarines HNLMS K X and USS Perch, and the occupation of Christmas Island. He wrote in his memoirs of having spotted Perch in the darkness of the night after detecting it when he saw a sailor topside on the vessel light a cigarette an estimated 4,000 meters (4,400 yd) away. He quit smoking after this incident. Under his command, Amatsukaze also took part in the Battle of Midway in June 1942 and the Battle of the Eastern Solomons in August 1942. On 13 November 1942 Hara's Amatsukaze sank the destroyer USS Barton and helped to sink the light cruiser USS Juneau during the Naval Battle of Guadalcanal but was severely damaged in turn after Hara left his searchlights on too long and drew intense fire from the light cruiser USS Helena.

After Amatsukaze returned to Japan for repairs, Hara was promoted to captain and given the command of Destroyer Division 27, flying his flag aboard Shigure. While this was technically a four-ship formation the demands on the Imperial navy were such that Hara's ships rarely operated together. While serving aboard Shigure, Hara was involved in several fierce naval engagements during the latter part of the Solomon Islands Campaign. While on a re-supply mission through Blackett Strait on 2 August 1943, Hara noticed a fireball exploding near leading destroyer Amagiri and ordered Shigure's crew to shoot at the burning wreckage of Lt. John F. Kennedy's patrol torpedo boat PT-109. During the Battle of Vella Gulf on 6–7 August Shigure was the only one of four Japanese destroyers to escape, though she was later found to have been hit by a torpedo, passing through the rudder, that failed to explode.

Although undamaged in the Bombing of Rabaul (November 1943), Shigure was ordered back to Sasebo for a long overdue refit. Hara was relieved of his command and reassigned as senior torpedo instructor at the Naval Torpedo School at Oppama near Yokosuka to teach students in the Imperial Japanese Navy's belated Motor Torpedo Boat program. Hara was quickly frustrated with the lack of effective equipment as well as the lack of leadership in the navy and army. He hastily wrote a letter intended for emperor Hirohito, urging him to fire the heads of the army and navy and seek peace as the war was lost, and hand-delivered it to Hirohito's younger brother Nobuhito, Prince Takamatsu, at the Navy Ministry. Despite the potentially grave consequences of this action Hara did not hear anything further on the matter.

Hara's last sortie was as captain of the light cruiser Yahagi as flagship of the destroyer screen accompanying Yamato on her fateful last mission as part of Operation Ten-Go. Hara survived the sinking of Yahagi, which also saw the loss of Yamato and four escorting destroyers.

Hara ended the war at Kawatana training Japanese sailors to operate Shinyo suicide boats, where he witnessed firsthand the effects of the second atomic bombing.

=== Major wartime actions ===
During the war Captain Hara participated in 14 major actions:

- Air raid against American naval base at Davao on Mindanao (Philippines), 8 December 1941, escorting aircraft carrier Ryūjō; a complete fiasco, as no American ships were found (on Amatsukaze)
- Invasion of Davao on 20 December 1941, an easy Japanese victory, as the base was already almost completely evacuated (on Amatsukaze)
- Invasion of Ambon Island, 30 January – 3 February 1942, a Japanese victory (on Amatsukaze)
- Battle of the Java Sea, 27–28 February 1942, a great Japanese victory (on Amatsukaze)
- Invasion of Christmas Island, 31 March 1942, an easy Japanese victory as British garrison surrendered without resistance (on Amatsukaze)
- Battle of Midway, 4–7 June 1942, a decisive Japanese defeat (on Amatsukaze)
- Battle of the Eastern Solomons, 24–25 August 1942, a serious Japanese defeat (on Amatsukaze)
- Battle of the Santa Cruz Islands, 26 October 1942, a costly Japanese victory (on Amatsukaze)
- Naval Battle of Guadalcanal, 13 November 1942, a costly Japanese defeat (on Amatsukaze)
- Battle of Vella Gulf, 6–7 August 1943, a crushing Japanese defeat (on Shigure)
- Battle off Horaniu, 17 August 1943, inconclusive (on Shigure)
- Battle of Vella Lavella, 6 October 1943, the last Japanese naval victory of the war (on Shigure)
- Battle of Empress Augusta Bay, 1–2 November 1943, a heavy Japanese defeat (on Shigure)
- Operation Ten-Go, 7 April 1945, a crushing Japanese defeat (on Yahagi)

=== List of victories ===
- British oil tanker, destroyed by Amatsukaze's guns during the successful capture of the port of Davao
- SS Op Ten Noort, a Dutch hospital ship that Amatsukaze helped to capture on 28 February 1942. She escorted Op Ten Noort to Singapore where she was converted into a prisoner of war ship.
- HNLMS K X, a Dutch submarine fatally damaged by Amatsukaze and the destroyer Hatsukaze on 1 March 1942. K X was scuttled the next day in harbor due to being damaged too badly to escape the increasingly hostile port of Surabaya.
- USS Perch, an already crippled US submarine finished off by Amatsukaze and the destroyer Yukikaze, 3 March 1942.
- USS Barton, US destroyer sunk by two torpedo hits fired by Amatsukaze during the Naval Battle of Guadalcanal, 13 November 1942.
- USS Juneau, US light cruiser crippled by a torpedo from Amatsukaze, and finished off the next day by submarine I-26 as Juneau limped back to base. Battle of Guadalcanal, 13 November 1942.
- USS Selfridge, US destroyer crippled and put out of action for six months by torpedoes fired by destroyers Shigure and Samidare under Hara's command. Battle of Vella Lavella, 6–7 October 1943.

Approximately ten US, British, and Australian aircraft were shot down by the destroyer Shigure and light cruiser Yahagi while under Hara's command, though not all of these claims are verified by Allied sources.

== Later life and memoirs ==
Postwar Hara commanded merchant ships which transported salt. Hara was the only IJN destroyer captain at the start of World War II who survived the war. This left him the sole surviving witness to several important meetings and conferences which he recounted in his memoirs. Hara's memoirs, Japanese Destroyer Captain: Pearl Harbor, Guadalcanal, Midway – the Great Naval Battles as Seen Through Japanese Eyes (1961), were translated into English and French and became an important reference for the Japanese perspective for historians writing about the Pacific Campaign of World War II. In his memoir, Hara objects to compulsory suicide as official doctrine, which he saw as a violation of bushido values. His personal doctrines demonstrate why he survived the war and the Japanese lost it – they were inflexible, and he was not. His doctrines were "Never ever do the same thing twice" and "If he hits you high, then hit him low; if he hits you low, then hit him high", the latter being also a maxim of Douglas MacArthur's. Hara criticizes his superiors for using cavalry tactics to fight naval battles; never understanding the implications of air power; dividing their forces in the face of enemy forces of unknown strength; basing tactics on what they thought their enemy would do; failing to appreciate the speed with which the enemy could develop new weapons and accepting a war of attrition with a foe more capable of maintaining it.

Hara does make some mistakes in this memoir, the most egregious of which would be his claim that the destroyer Murasame torpedoed and sank the light cruiser USS Helena at the naval battle of Guadalcanal, (Helena actually survived the battle without significant damage, and was only later sunk at the battle of Kula Gulf by the destroyers Suzukaze and Tanikaze, 6 June 1943), and that there were three Japanese battleships at the 2nd naval battle of Guadalcanal (there was in fact only one, the Kirishima).

== Personal life ==
Hara had three children with his wife Chizu: two daughters Keiko and Yoko, and a son, Mikito, who was born shortly before the start of hostilities.
