= Japanese destroyer Amatsukaze (1939) =

Kagerō-class destroyer

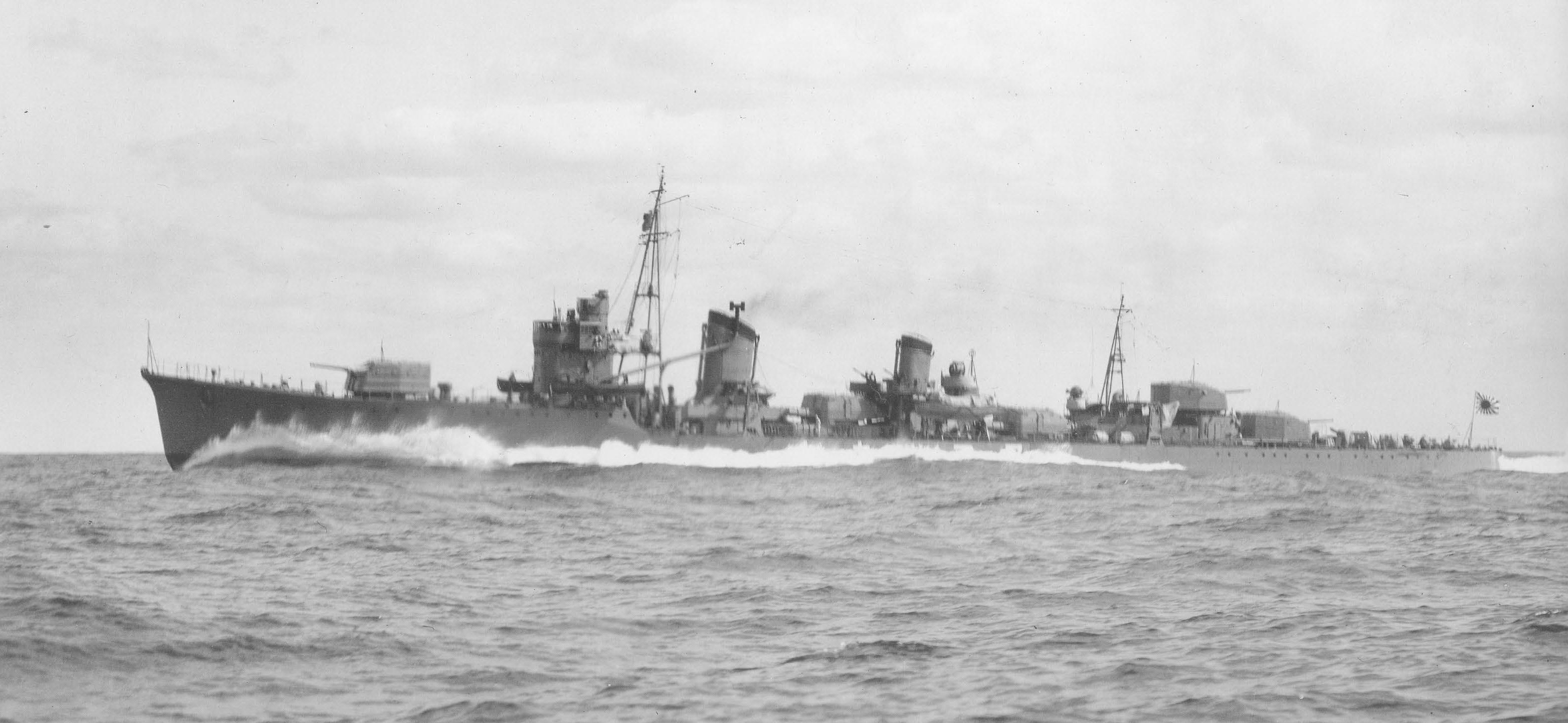
- Amatsukaze on sea trials off Uraga on 17 October 1940

History

Empire of Japan
- Name: Amatsukaze
- Ordered: 1937
- Builder: Maizuru Naval Arsenal
- Laid down: 14 February 1939
- Launched: 19 October 1939
- Commissioned: 26 October 1940
- Stricken: 10 August 1945
- Fate: Scuttled after air attack, 10 April 1945

General characteristics
- Class & type: Kagerō-class destroyer
- Displacement: 2,490 long tons (2,530 t)
- Length: 118.5 m (388 ft 9 in)
- Beam: 10.8 m (35 ft 5 in)
- Draft: 3.8 m (12 ft 6 in)
- Speed: 35.5 knots (65.7 km/h; 40.9 mph)
- Complement: 240
- Armament: 6 × 127 mm (5.0 in) DP guns; up to 28 × Type 96 25 mm (0.98 in) AA guns; up to 4 × 13.2 mm (0.52 in) AA guns; 2 × quadruple 610 mm (24 in) torpedo tubes; 36 depth charges

Service record
- Commanders: Cmdr. Tameichi Hara (April 1940 – January 1943)
- Operations: Battle of the Java Sea (1942); Battle of the Eastern Solomons (1942); Battle of the Santa Cruz Islands (1942); Naval Battle of Guadalcanal (1942)
- Victories: Unnamed British oil tanker; SS Op Ten Noort (1927); HNLMS K-10 (1923); USS Perch (SS-176) (1936); USS Barton (DD-599) (1942); USS Juneau (CL-52) (1942)

Amatsukaze (天津風; "Heavenly Wind") was a Kagerō-class destroyer of the Imperial Japanese Navy. Captained by Tameichi Hara throughout 1942, Amatsukaze saw heavy combat. She took part in the capture of several key areas in the Philippines and Dutch East Indies, notably when she captured the port of Davao, bombarding the shores and destroying attempts by machine gunners to halt the landings and destroying a British oil tanker in the process.

Amatsukaze saw combat at the battle of the Java Sea, but only took part in a torpedo attack that failed to score any hits. However, in the battle's aftermath, Amatsukaze assisted in capturing the hospital ship SS Op Ten Noort. Amatsukaze then took part in patrol duties in the Java Sea, where she sank or helped to sink the submarines HNLMS K-10 and USS Perch. Amatsukaze escorted Admiral Yamamoto's battleship force during the battle of Midway, and escorted carriers during the battles of the Eastern Solomons and Santa Cruz.

Amatsukaze probably saw the highlight of her career at the first naval battle of Guadalcanal, November 13, 1942, fighting an allied cruiser force at point blank range. With torpedo hits, Amatsukaze sank the destroyer USS Barton and helped to sink the light cruiser USS Juneau, before she shelled the crippled heavy cruiser USS San Francisco, but was herself crippled by shellfire from the light cruiser USS Helena, but managed to survive and withdraw from the battle.

Upon being repaired, Amatsukaze saw a variety of escorting roles throughout 1943, but did not see combat. On January 16, 1944, Amatsukaze was damaged beyond repair by a torpedo fired from the submarine USS Redfin which blew her in two. The forward section rapidly sank, but the aft section miraculously stayed afloat and was towed to Singapore, where she spent nearly the rest of her service. In March 1945, what was left of Amatsukaze was rigged with a temporary bow and departed in a vain attempt to make it to mainland Japan, but on April 6 she was forced to run aground after being hit by land-based air attacks, and finally scuttled on April 10.

After the war, Tameichi Hara published a book on his experiences as a destroyer captain, which included a detailed service of his time aboard Amatsukaze and the combat she went through.

== Design and description ==
The Kagerō class was an enlarged and improved version of the preceding Asashio class. Their crew numbered 240 officers and enlisted men. The ships measured 118.5 meters (388 ft 9 in) overall, with a beam of 10.8 meters (35 ft 5 in) and a draft of 3.76 meters (12 ft 4 in). They displaced 2,065 metric tons (2,032 long tons) at standard load and 2,529 metric tons (2,489 long tons) at deep load. The ships had two Kampon geared steam turbines, each driving one propeller shaft using steam provided by three Kampon water-tube boilers. The turbines were rated at a total of 52,000 shaft horsepower (39,000 kW) for a designed speed of 35 knots (65 km/h; 40 mph). The ships had a range of 5,000 nautical miles (9,300 km; 5,800 mi) at a speed of 18 knots (33 km/h; 21 mph).

Amatsukaze differed from her sisterships in having an experimental boiler system that built up a higher steam pressure. While the ship's top speed of 35.5 knots remained unaffected, she possessed a remarkably superior fuel economy to her sister ships, and thus scored a longer range.

The main armament of the Kagerō class consisted of six Type 3 127-millimeter (5 in) dual-purpose guns in three twin-gun turrets, one turret forward of the superstructure and one superfiring pair aft. They were built with four Type 96 25-millimeter (1 in) anti-aircraft (AA) guns in two twin-gun mounts, but more of these guns were added over the course of the war. The ships were also armed with two quadruple rotating mounts for 610-millimeter (24 in) torpedo tubes for the oxygen-fueled Type 93 "Long Lance" torpedo; one reload was carried for each tube. Their anti-submarine weapons originally comprised 16 depth charges, but this was increased to 36 by 1942.

== Construction and commissioning ==
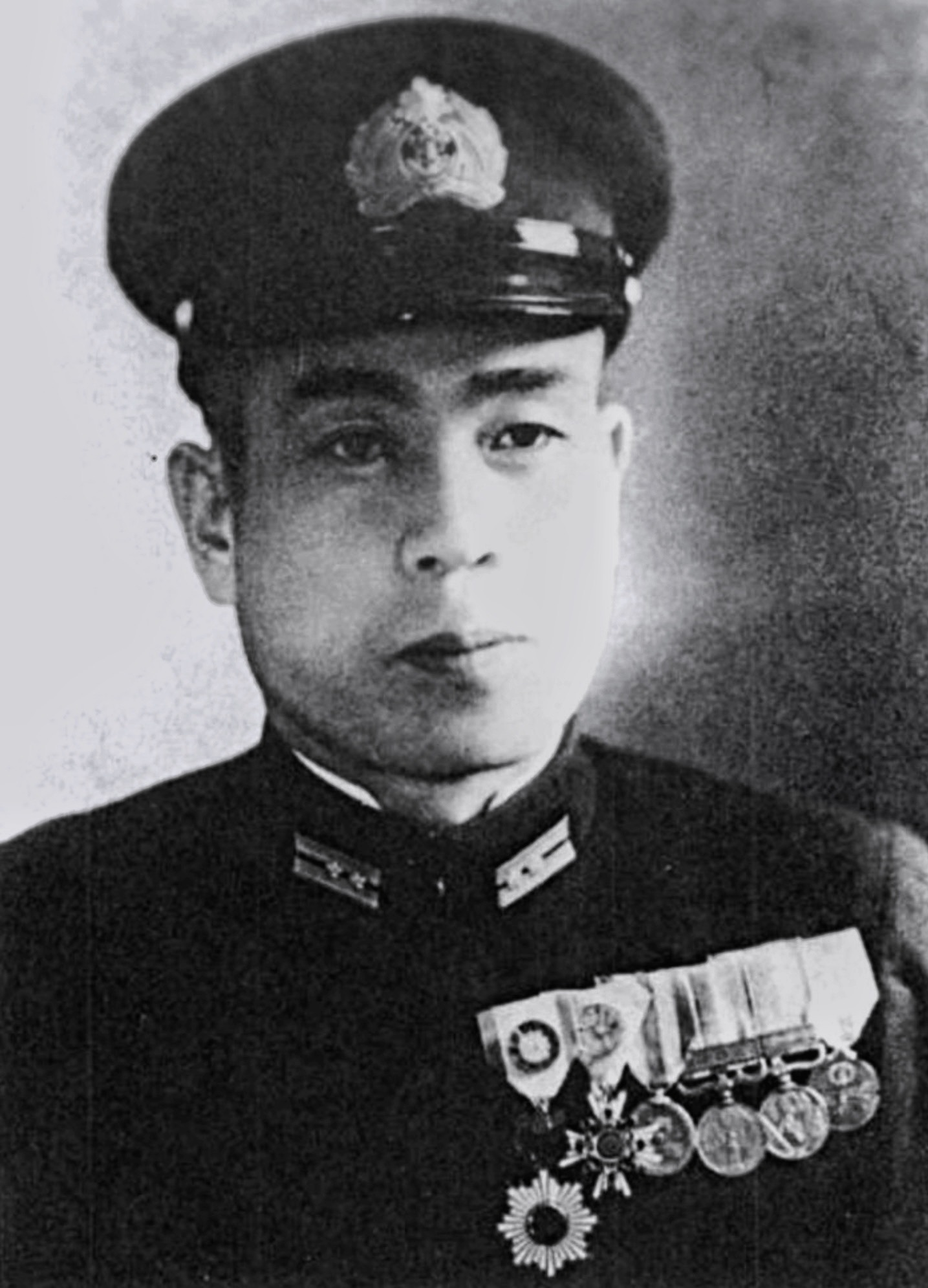
Tameichi Hara, Amatsukaze's captain throughout all of 1942

Amatsukaze was laid down in the Maizuru Naval Arsenal on February 14, 1939, launched on October 19 of that year, and commissioned on October 26, 1940. In the spring of 1941, Amatsukaze was put under the command of Captain Tameichi Hara. On November 25, Amatsukaze joined over 200 ships of Combined Fleet at Yokosuka, before steaming with three of her sister ships led by the light cruiser Jintsū to take part in the invasion of the Philippines. Amatsukaze met up with the light carrier Ryūjō to escort her to Palau by the time of the Attack on Pearl Harbor on December 7, 1941.

== World War II ==
After escorting Ryūjō to Palau, Amatsukaze guarded Legaspi from December 12 to 19. On the 20th, she departed with the invasion force for the port of Davao. Docking outside the port, Amatsukaze was tasked with launching high speed motorboats carrying troops for the invasion while standing off the port's defenses and ships. Some 200 machine gunners attacked from the shore, killing one of the soldiers and injuring several others. Amatsukaze fired her 12.7 cm (5 in) guns at the enemy, forcing them to retreat and killing many of them, and in the process a stray shell hit a British oil tanker, causing it to explode and burn for over three days before being deemed a total wreck. Shortly afterwards, Amatsukaze discovered an enemy submarine, and slowed to 8 knots for the ship's sonar to work properly. Amatsukaze attacked twice with depth charges, and a large oil spill could be spotted, leading Captain Hara to conclude the submarine sunk. (Note: Amatsukaze claimed to have sunk two additional submarines alongside her confirmed kills on HNLMS K X and USS Perch, but these remain unconfirmed.)

=== Java Sea campaign ===
Amatsukaze was anchored at Davao when B-17 bomber aircraft attacked the port. Though Amatsukaze was unable to move, she was not damaged. After a series of patrol duties and transiting from various naval facilities, on January 9, 1942, Amatsukaze departed Magnaga Bay, and met with the Menado invasion force on the 11th. After successfully escorting the invasion force, she arrived at the Banka anchorage on the 17th, then departed with the Kendari invasion force on the 24th, then protected the Ambon invasion force on the 29th. Arriving at Hitulama anchorage on the 30th, Amatsukaze took on invasion force casualties from Ambon on February 1, then remained anchored until February 20 to escort the Timor invasion force.

==== Battle of the Java Sea ====
On February 26, Amatsukaze and other destroyers came under more air attacks, but were again not damaged. However, a spotting plane met the destroyers and informed their crews of an Allied force of five cruisers attempting to sink enemy troop convoys. Amatsukaze met with the heavy cruisers Haguro and Nachi, with the latter's floatplane trailing the enemy force and radioing their actions. By 6:00 on the 27th, Captain Hara aboard Amatsukaze spotted enemy ships, two heavy cruisers, three light cruisers, and nine destroyers, and ordered the destroyers to close to point blank range. At around 6,000 meters (6,600 yd), Amatsukaze took minor damage from near misses and was blinded by smoke from the destroyer Tokitsukaze, which had taken a shell hit. However, Hara ordered the torpedoes to be fired, simultaneously with six other destroyers, launching a total of 56 torpedoes. However, not a single torpedo made its mark. While the destroyer HNLMS Kortenaer was hit by a Japanese torpedo and sank nearly instantly, this hit was credited to Haguro and none of the destroyers.

Later that night, Amatsukaze was en route sweeping for enemy ships when four destroyers were encountered. This was USS Paul Jones, Alden, John D. Ford, and John D. Edwards, which had broken off from the main formation after expending all of their torpedoes. Amatsukaze fired upon the force but did not light the searchlights as she fled from the outnumbering formation, with no hits scored on either side. While Haguro and Nachi continued the Battle of the Java Sea, spearheading a crucial victory, Amatsukaze saw no further combat. In the aftermath of the battle on the 28th, Amatsukaze spotted the hospital ship Op Ten Noort, which was rescuing survivors from various sunken Allied warships. Amatsukaze halted Op Ten Noort, Captain Hara looked through his binoculars and viewed Op Ten Noort's captain walking onto the deck to speak with his Japanese captors, and Amatsukaze was ordered to escort the ship to Bawean Island as a war prize, leaving the crew unharmed. En route, Amatsukaze radioed the position of around 100 Allied survivors to Japanese intelligence, leading to their eventual rescue.

==== Submarine successes ====
On 1 March, Amatsukaze was continuing to escort Op Ten Noort to Bandjermasin, when she broke a record by sinking or helping to sink two enemy submarines in a 24-hour period. At 1:10, spotters on Amatsukaze located the submarine USS Perch, which was continuing the dying effort of halting the Java Sea invasion convoy. Amatsukaze sped to 26 knots, opened searchlights, and fired 32 rounds at 2,735 yards (2,500 meters), allegedly hitting Perch with at least three 5-inch (127 mm) shells, forcing her to crash dive. Amatsukaze and Hatsukaze closed to the submarine's position and each dropped six depth charges, successfully crippling Perch. Half of her engines and boilers were destroyed and her pressure hull and conning tower were dented inwards up to 2 feet (61 cm), likely damaging her hull beyond repair, several ventilation valves were jammed shut, major leaking occurred through the ship's doors and gaskets, and around 90% of the ship's instruments and gauges were destroyed. Over the course of two days, the crippled Perch was finished off by depth charges and gunfire from the destroyers Ushio and Sazanami.

Later that night at 22:25, Amatsukaze spotted another submarine on the surface, this time the Dutch submarine K-10. Amatsukaze hit K-10 with multiple 5-inch (127 mm) shells as she immediately began to crash dive. In response, Amatsukaze chased the enemy and dropped a total of four depth charges, crippling yet another submarine. K-10 limped to Surabaya, but the next day was scuttled in harbor as the damage inflicted by Amatsukaze rendered her unable to flee the increasingly dangerous Dutch East Indies.

On the 2nd, Amatsukaze delivered Op Ten Noort to her destination where she was converted into the prison ship Tenno Maru, then refueled to engage in patrol duty in the Java Sea, and departed for more anti submarine patrol duty. All was quite on the 2nd, but the next day Jintsū was attacked by an enemy submarine, possibly USS S-38, all torpedoes missed as Amatsukaze prepped for action, but the submarine crash dived before the destroyer could fire even a single round; greatly disappointing her crew. (Note: Captain Hara mistook this attack's date for 1 March, when Jintsū's TROM notes being attacked by an enemy submarine on the 3rd) However, sorrow turned to excitement as later that Captain Hara from the bridge noticed a dim flickering light which dissipated after a few moments and viewed it though his binoculars. This was a sailor lighting a cigarette on the deck of an enemy submarine. Amatsukaze sped to 30 knots (56 km/h; 35 mph) as torpedoes fired by the opponent missed, and in turn Amatsukaze blasted the submarine and reportedly hit it with six 5-inch (127 mm) shells, resulting in it disappearing beneath the waves. Amatsukaze closed the range and dropped four depth charges on its reported location, and a sinking was claimed. The submarine in question may have been S-38, which after engaging a cruiser, crashdiving, and resurfacing, was attacked by an enemy destroyer, fired torpedoes at said destroyer, and was damaged. Sources heavily differ on whether the cruiser S-38 engaged was Kinu or Jintsū, but if it was Jintsū then S-38 is a great match for Amatsukaze's opponent. Captain Hara called Amatsukaze's crew on deck, congratulating them for their kill and deciding to ban smoking on the deck due to the experience. Amatsukaze continued patrol duties for the rest of the month, but did not encounter another submarine. (Note: This submarine is sometimes cited as USS Perch, but she was already finished off earlier that morning by gunfire from Ushio) (Note: A select few Japanese sources speak of Amatsukaze sinking the American submarine USS Shark on 8 March 1942. This differs from the generally accepted and almost certain fate that Shark was sunk by the Japanese destroyer Yamakaze on 11 February 1942)

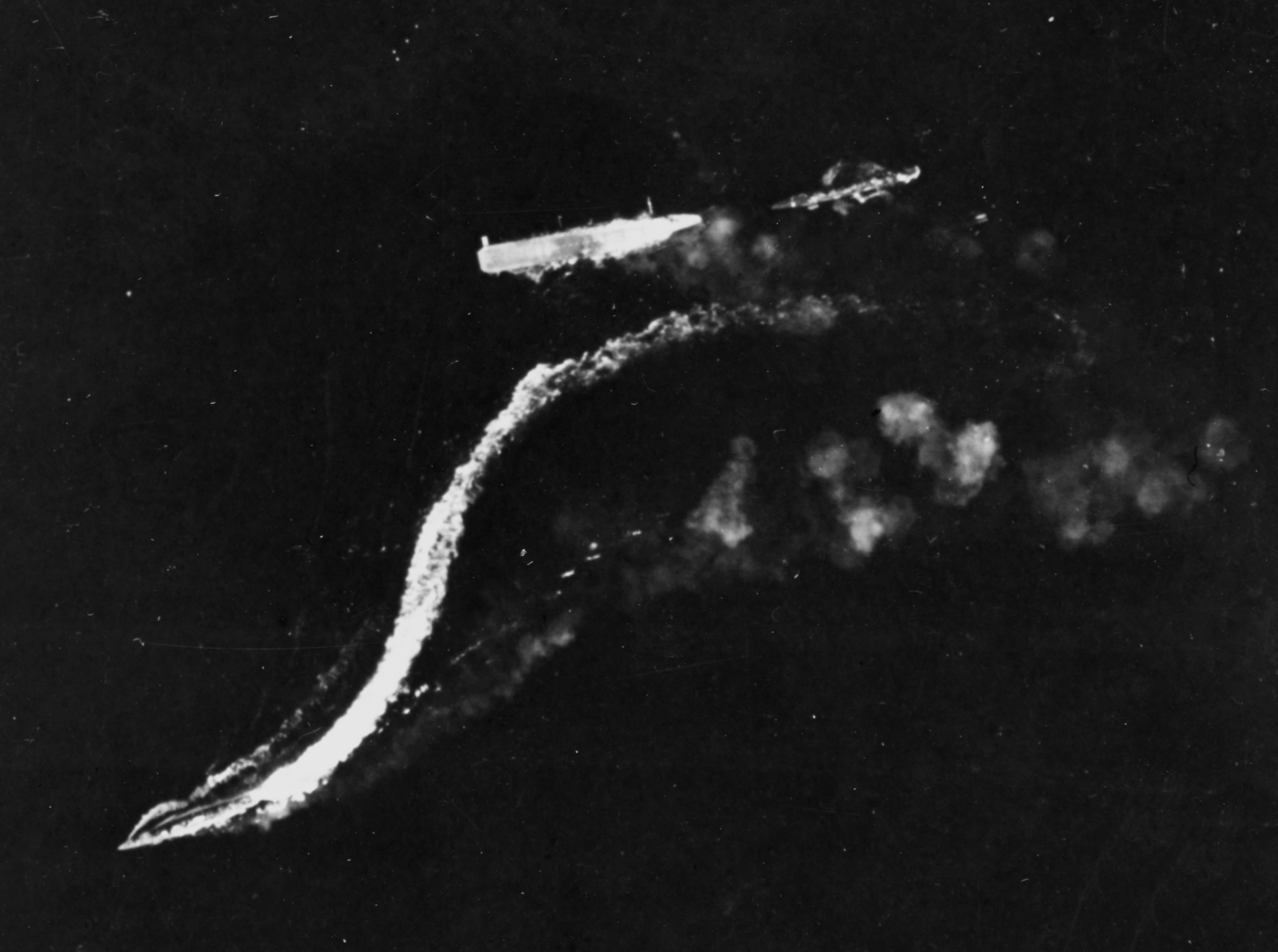
Amatsukaze (bottom left) evading B-17 bombing runs at the battle of the Eastern Solomons, August 24, 1942, alongside the destroyer Tokitsukaze and the light carrier Ryūjō

On March 31, Amatsukaze took part in shore bombardment duties on Christmas Island, which contained very rich phosphate ore deposits. Even before the landings were completed, British soldiers surrendered and began loading ore on to the Japanese troop ships. On April 1, Amatsukaze witnessed the light cruiser Naka's bow being blown off by a torpedo fired from the submarine USS Seawolf before escorting her to Singapore. From April 25 to May 3, Amatsukaze was drydocked in Kure for maintenance, before between May 21 and May 25, she steamed from Kure to Saipan.

Amatsukaze was tasked with escorting a troop convoy during the Battle of Midway for a potential invasion of Midway Island, June 4 to 7. However, she saw no combat as the events of the battle were radioed to her. Captain Hara listened as the battle turned into a defeat, with four aircraft carriers and a heavy cruiser sunk to US carrier attacks. Admiral Yamamoto initially ordered the surface force to attack American warships, but within two hours the order was recalled. On the 7th, Amatsukaze assisted the sinking aircraft carrier Akagi.

On August 16, Amatsukaze escorted the Japanese fleet to Truk, before departing for the Guadalcanal campaign. On the 24th, Amatsukaze escorted a decoy aircraft carrier force during the Battle of the Eastern Solomons, and evaded the incoming land-based and carrier-based air attacks. Amatsukaze was not damaged but witnessed the sinking of the light carrier Ryūjō to aircraft from the carrier USS Saratoga. In the battle's aftermath, she rescued Ryūjō survivors and the crew of a ditched Zuikaku bomber. Amatsukaze took part in patrol duties off Truk throughout September, before scouting for a US seaplane base from October 12 to 13. On the 15th, she joined up with Admiral Kondō's carrier force and escorted them in what became known as the Battle of the Santa Cruz Islands. On the 26th, air attacks from US carriers damaged several Japanese warships but scored no sinkings, and Amatsukaze was not damaged. In turn, the Japanese planes sank the aircraft carrier USS Hornet and the destroyer USS Porter, and damaged several other US warships, ending the battle in a Japanese victory. Amatsukaze returned to Truk, where she spent the rest of the month in harbor.

=== Naval battle of Guadalcanal ===
At Truk, Amatsukaze grouped with a large Japanese task force. With a goal of conducting another major bombardment on Henderson Field, a former Japanese air base which was captured by US forces and being used against Japanese shipping to great effect, the main ships of the force consisted of the battleships Hiei and Kirishima, each armed with eight 14-inch (356 mm) guns and a variety of smaller guns. Hiei served as Admiral Abe's flagship. Escorting the force came the light cruiser Nagara, and a total of eleven destroyers, including Amatsukaze. The force departed on November 9, 1942. While the destroyers initially operated in a standard formation, sailing in the direction of a nearby rain squall, that had managed to break up the formation and leave the destroyers operating in small clusters, in turn leaving Amatsukaze operating alongside the destroyers Yukikaze and Teruzuki in the center left of the force.

In the early morning of the 13th, the force was en route when by 1:25, signs of enemy ships began to appear. A force of two heavy cruisers, three light cruisers, and eight destroyers had intercepted the force. By 1:48, Hiei and the destroyer Akatsuki illuminated the light cruiser USS Atlanta, starting the battle in a point blank range skirmish which resulted in Akatsuki's sinking. Amatsukaze's group was in the middle of the action, and while Yukikaze and Teruzuki rushed to engage the enemy, Amatsukaze was blocked by the destroyers Ikazuchi and Inazuma which were preparing a counterattack to the US ships that sank Akatsuki (successfully sinking Atlanta). Amatsukaze before firing a single shot was singled out by the destroyer USS Cushing, 5-inch (127 mm) shells splashed around Amatsukaze , but before she could receive a direct hit, the light cruiser Nagara, leading the destroyers Yukikaze and Harusame blasted and crippled Cushing, before Teruzuki finished her off. (Note: Captain Hara believed USS Cushing was aiming at Hiei, but her shots were so badly aimed they rained around Amatsukaze. However, US records show Cushing specifically singled out an enemy destroyer.)

==== Sinking of USS Barton ====
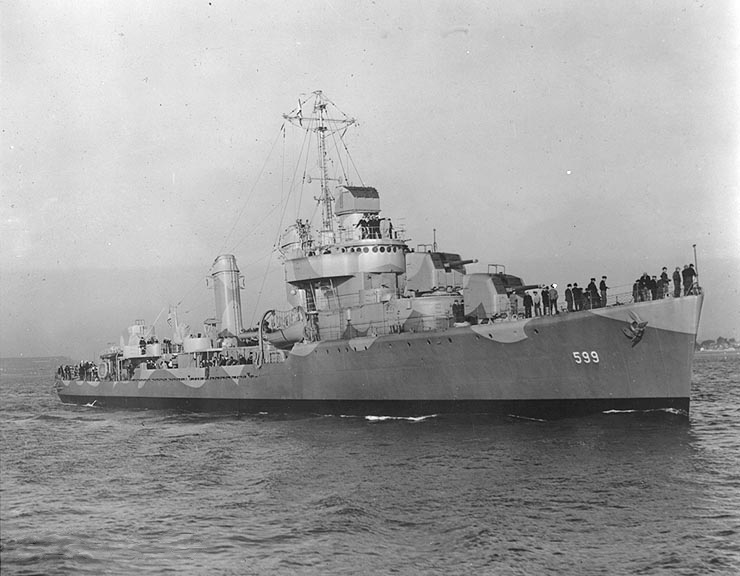
Destroyer USS Barton, sunk by two of Amatsukaze's torpedoes

Eventually, the way was cleared and Captain Hara ordered Amatsukaze to charge at full speed to engage and sink enemy warships, hoping to put his knowledge in torpedo warfare to use. As Amatsukaze sailed passed Hiei into firing range, star shells fired from Nagara illuminated a cluster of American destroyers peppering Hiei with shellfire, consisting of USS Fletcher, Monssen, Aaron Ward, and Barton. At about 5,000 meters (5,500 yd), Amatsukaze closed the range as the torpedo crew readied a spread of eight type 93 torpedoes. At 3,000 meters, after plenty of targeting adjustments, these torpedoes were launched, and Captain Hara's training in torpedo warfare paid off. Aaron Ward and Monssen barely avoided being torpedoed, with excellent maneuvering still only allowing them to just evade the long lances. Barton was not as lucky, she was forced to slow down to avoid colliding with the maneuvering Aaron Ward, and before she could regain speed, two of Amatsukaze's torpedoes made their mark, one hitting the engine room and the other hitting the boiler room. Barton erupted in an explosion of flames and steam and blew in half, sinking within minutes with the loss of 168 men.

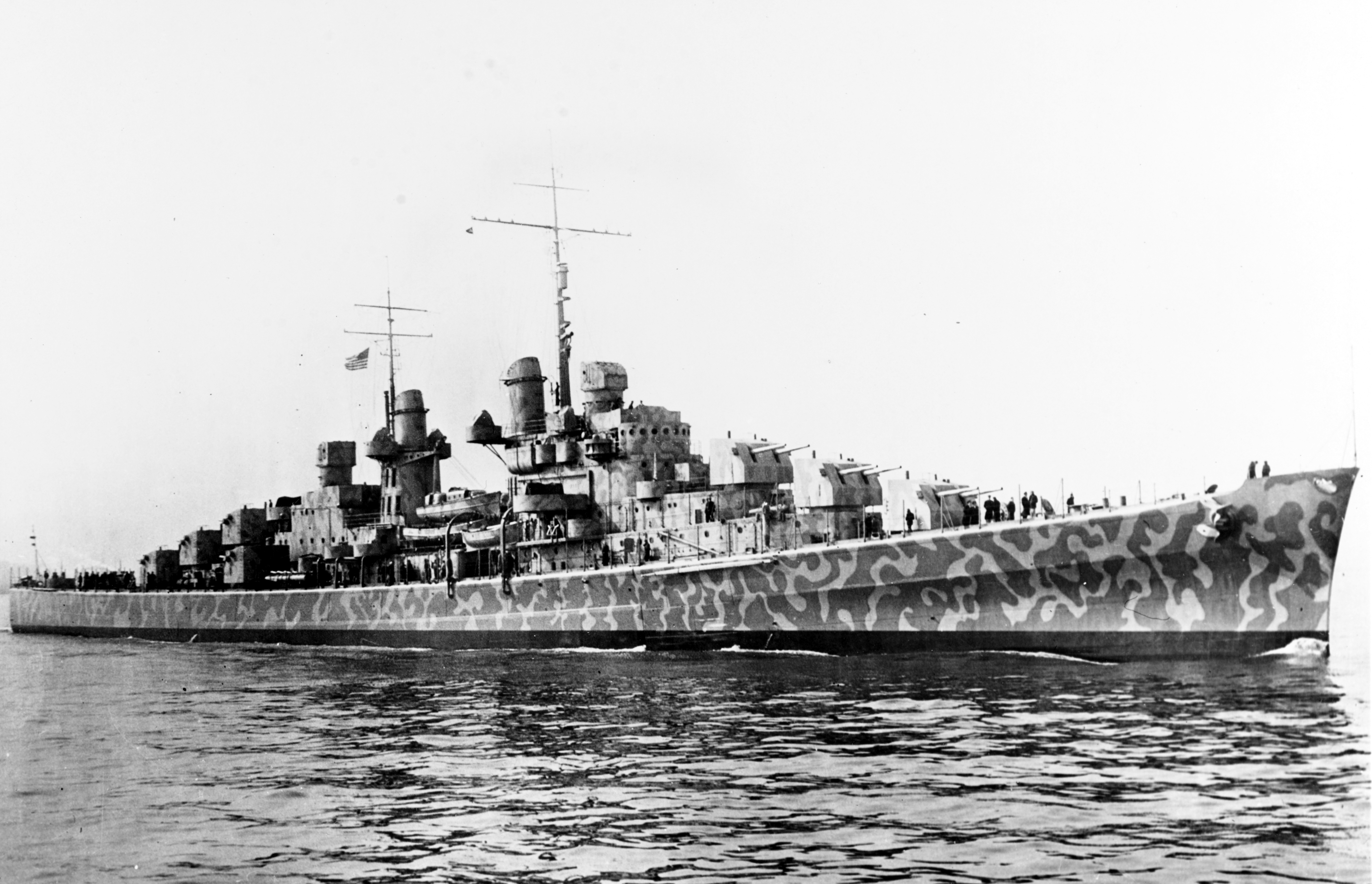
The light cruiser USS Juneau anchored off New York City on 11 February 1942, sunk by Amatsukaze and I-26

==== Torpedoing USS Juneau ====
Amatsukaze then retreated to Hiei's location to reload her torpedoes, which she undertook for several minutes. Eventually, Amatsukaze spotted the destroyer Yūdachi under fire from the light cruiser USS Juneau. No hits were scored, but in an attempt to cover Yūdachi, Amatsukaze closed the range to hit Juneau with her freshly reloaded torpedoes. Four torpedoes were let out, and some three minutes later, one of them hit Juneau's port side. The torpedo broke her keel, disabled all electrical power, and left her limping at 13 knots (24 km/h; 15 mph), forcing the cruiser to withdraw from the battle. Had Amatsukaze fired a full spread of eight torpedoes, she likely would have directly sunk Juneau then and there, but it did not matter as later that morning, the still crippled Juneau was finished off by another torpedo fired from the submarine I-26 that hit nearly the exact same position Amatsukaze's torpedo hit, breaking her in half and sinking her with the loss all but 10 sailors. Aboard Juneau, all five of the Sullivan brothers died. This led to the Sole Survivor Policy in the United States, that if all but one sibling is killed in combat, the remaining sibling is honorably discharged.

==== Further actions ====
After helping to sink Juneau, Amatsukaze attempted to regroup with Hiei, whose flames from cruiser and destroyer gunfire made her the only recognizable ship. However, before she could do so, she nearly collided with a mysterious "ghost ship". It had no signs of activity, and Captain Hara did not recognize the ship's silhouette, initially believing the submarine tender Jingei had somehow stumbled her way into the battle. However, upon the searchlight's activation, he realized the mysterious ship was none other than the crippled heavy cruiser USS San Francisco, so badly mauled by Hiei and Kirishima's gunfire she did not even resemble a warship, yet remained afloat. Amatsukaze's last remaining torpedoes were fired, and gun crews fired her six 5-inch (127 mm) guns for the first time of the battle, the range was so close that allegedly almost every shell hit its target. 5-inch (127 mm) shells destroyed San Francisco's remaining port side secondary battery and set fire to her bridge, killing several of her officers and crew. However, much to Hara's surprise, no torpedo explosions were seen or heard as he realized he forgot a safety feature that prevented the Type 93 torpedoes from exploding within 500 meters (550 yd) to prevent friendly fire, thus none of the torpedoes damaged San Francisco. (Note: Naval historian Robert Lundgren claims the ship Amatsukaze shelled was actually the destroyer USS Monssen. However, this claim is doubtful given the fact that Amatsukaze illuminated the cruiser at point blank range, claims from Amatsukaze to shell the cruiser match San Francisco being shelled by a lone destroyer, and most crucially it was only several minutes after Amatsukaze silenced her guns that her crew personally witnessed Monssen's sinking to Asagumo, Murasame, and Samidare.)

In his frustration, Hara then forgot that the searchlights were still turned on. Ordering them shut off, it was too late as the bright light attracted the attention of the light cruiser USS Helena. 6-inch (152 mm) gunfire rained around Amatsukaze, and as she attempted to lay a smokescreen the third salvo landed a hit to the fire director station, killing everyone inside, followed by another 6-inch (152 mm) shell hitting the radio room. Three more hits followed through, disabling Amatsukaze's hydraulics system which jammed her guns and her steering wheel. A total of 43 men were dead. However, salvation would come as a trio of Japanese destroyers, the Asagumo, Murasame, and Samidare, finally made it to the battle and charged Helena, taking her attention away from Amatsukaze and allowing her to hide a behind a smokescreen as Hara watched Murasame "torpedo and sink" Helena (the cruiser actually survived the battle without significant damage).

==== Aftermath of the battle ====
Despite the damage, Amatsukaze's engine was intact, and her crew managed to manually control the rudder near the ship's stern and hid in her smokescreen for emergency repairs. As she did so, Amatsukaze's crew watched the sinking of the destroyer USS Monssen by gunfire from Asagumo, Murasame, and Samidare. With the battle coming to an end, Amatsukaze withdrew from the fight cruising at 20 knots (37 km/h; 23 mph). With the break of daylight, she had a minor encounter with US planes, but the bombers poorly aimed their arsenal and missed. No follow up air attacks ensued, because all air attacks were focused on Hiei, crippled by shell hits from San Francisco that jammed her rudder, and they successfully finished her off. Eventually, Amatsukaze was suddenly met by a destroyer, but this happened to be the Yukikaze attempting to assist Hiei. In stark contrast, she had survived the battle completely undamaged. They passed each other as crews on deck exchanged greetings. Amatsukaze managed to make it to Truk on the 14th, and was welcomed by the sailors of ships anchored in the port.

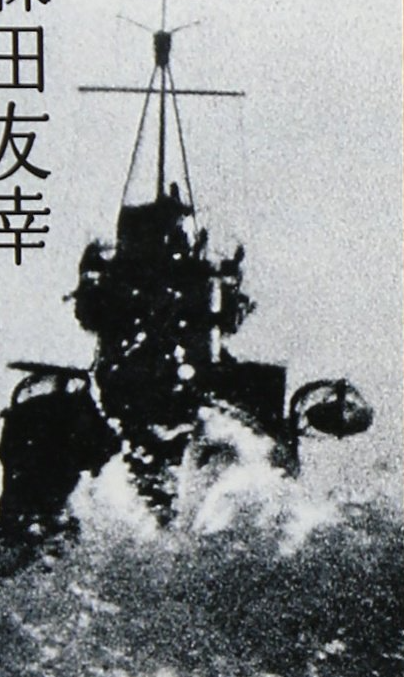
Amatsukaze on training duty

Upon arrival at Truk, funeral proceedings were enacted for the 43 men that died aboard the ship before departing for Kure, arriving on November 18, where she was immediately put under repair. During these repairs, Tameichi Hara was reassigned to the destroyer Shigure on 10 January 1943, and he was replaced by commander Tanaka Masao. In the meantime, Amatsukaze received new triple AA mounts installed on her bridge and near the aft funnel, and she received basic sets of spotting radar. In February, these repairs were completed, and on the 5th Amatsukaze left Kure to escort Kumano to Truk, arriving on the 10th, which was followed up with a troop transport run to Wewak, then towing the disabled destroyer Harusame to Truk. Amatsukaze stayed anchored in Truk for a time, and from March 19 to April 3, she escorted a tanker convoy to Palau. Throughout the next few months, Amatsukaze engaged in a series of escorting missions for large troop convoys from Palau Wewak and Hansa Bay, ending in the month of July. On August 1, Amatsukaze returned to Kure and was docked for maintenance, where she received Type 22 radar mountings.

From August 16 to 23, Amatsukaze departed alongside the battleship Yamato en route for Truk, and from September 18 to 25, she departed as part of the overall Japanese fleet attempting to counterattack American aircraft carrier raids, but the force did not see action. From October 21 to 27, Amatsukaze escorted the tanker Hoyo Maru from Truk to Eniwetok in support of the fleet operating in the Marshalls, and on November 2 she departed on an aircrew transport mission to Rabaul, and en route assisted the damaged tanker Nissho Maru. On November 11, Tanaka was promoted from a commander to a captain, followed immediately by escorting convoys to Palau and back to Truk from the 12th to 24th. Amatsukaze rounded out 1943 by escorting the light carrier Chitose and the supply ship Irako from Truk to Yokosuka from December 7 to 14.

=== Torpedoed by USS Redfin ===
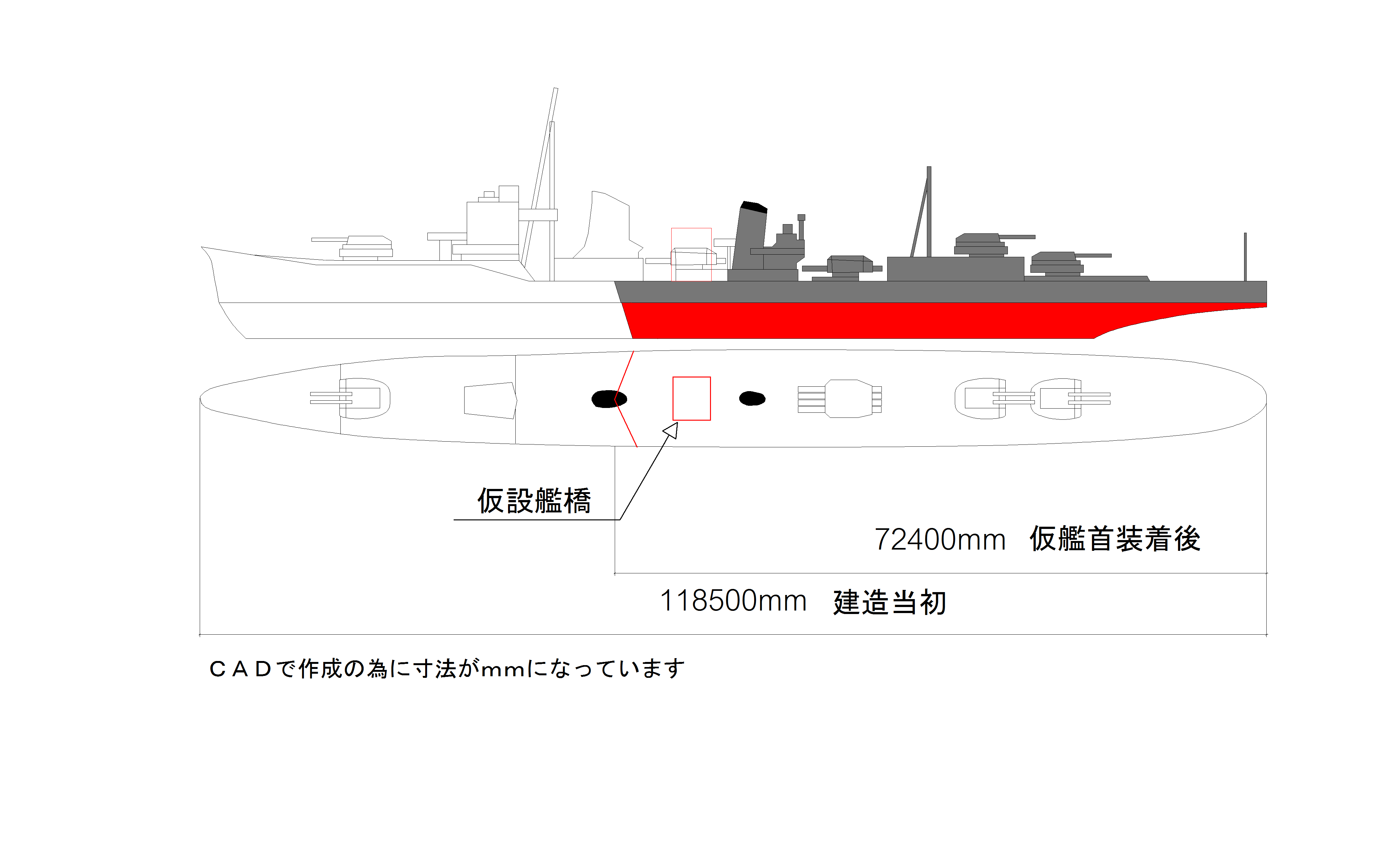
A drawing of the damage to Amatsukaze inflicted by USS Redfin

On 11 January 1944, Amatsukaze departed in the South China Sea to escort high speed oil tankers to Singapore, when en route the task force was located by the submarine USS Redfin. Amatsukaze investigated Redfin, but the submarine crashed dived, and immediately afterwards Amatsukaze turned away to rejoin the convoy. This proved to be a fatal mistake as Redfin was given a full broadside to engage and unleashed four torpedoes. One of these torpedoes hit Amatsukaze to the port side between the first and second compartments, and resulted in a magazine explosion. Amatsukaze slowly tipped by the bow until being torn in half. The forward half rapidly sank with the loss of 80 men, including Captain Furukawa Bunji.

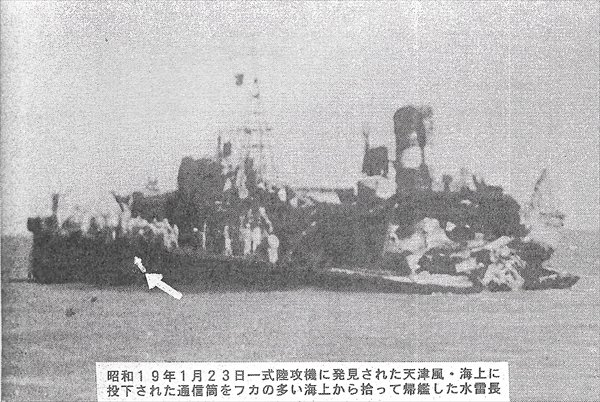
The crippled Amatsukaze photographed after being torpedoed by Redfin. The arrow points to chief torpedo officer Eiji Maniwa

However, the back half of Amatsukaze stayed afloat. She was presumed sunk by the rest of the convoy after a failed attempt by other ships to search for survivors, and was left adrift for six days, the engine was flooded and all reliable radio equipment went down with the ship's forward half, meaning the crew were stuck in the middle of the ocean with no communications. On the 16th, the adrift Amatsukaze was spotted by a Japanese patrol plane, which prompted the elderly destroyer Asagao to tow Amatsukaze for emergency repairs in Singapore, arriving on the 24th.

Upon arriving at Singapore, Amatsukaze was immediately drydocked for emergency repairs. However, Singapore did not have the resources to fully repair Amatsukaze, so she spent the next ten months as a half of a ship stuck in drydock. However, on November 15, Amatsukaze was finally rigged with a false bow, although she was far from being fully repaired. With a length of just 72.4 meters (237 ft 6 in), Amatsukaze was armed with four 5-inch (127 mm) guns in two aft twin turrets, and a single quadruple torpedo tube mount. She was initially capable of just 12 knots, but repairs brought her top speed up to 20 knots. In this state, Amatsukaze was used for local patrol and escort duties, far from a frontline warship. Amatsukaze kept up this role until 10 February 1945, when the destroyer Kasumi docked in Singapore. Her experienced captain, Tomoyuki Morita, was transferred from Kasumi to Amatsukaze, as the Japanese had a plan in mind to get the destroyer back to mainland Japan where she could be fully repaired. Amatsukaze would escort convoy HI-88J, which was the last convoy to be sent from Singapore to Japan, and upon arrival she would be docked for much needed repairs.

=== Convoy HI-88J ===
After a short period of training duties, Amatsukaze departed Singapore on 19 March to escort a total of seven troop ships to Japan. This was the first time the destroyer had sailed in the open ocean since she was torpedoed by Redfin. Two days after departure Sarawaka Maru hit a mine and sank, but for the next week the rest of the convoy sailed relevantly smoothly. However, on the 27th, the convoy was spotted by a B-24 bomber, and when one US plane attacked, more would follow. Amatsukaze's crew prepared for the inevitable fight, but even that did not prepare them for the onslaught by US forces which went on for several days. Two bombs from US aircraft hit the Asogawa Maru, which rapidly caught fire and sank, followed by the submarine USS Bluegill badly damaging Honan Maru, prompting Amatsukaze to engage the submarine, but she did not inflict damage. Over the next few days, more air and submarine attacks completely decimated the convoy and sank the majority of the Japanese ships involved. Amatsukaze was almost torpedoed by US aircraft, evading the torpedo spreads, and for her part managed to shoot down a single B-25 bomber. However, Amatsukaze's part of the plan was partially successful, as she managed to make it to Hong Kong, bringing the destroyer halfway closer to her destination of Japan.

=== Final battle ===
While anchored in Hong Kong, a raid by about 50 American planes damaged several Japanese ships, Amatsukaze was not among them. On 4 April, Amatsukaze finally departed Hong Kong alongside the troop transports Kine Maru and Tokai Maru. This was intended to be Amatsukaze's last journey that finally brought her to mainland Japan for some much needed repairs. However, the next day the force was spotted by allied aircraft, and an attack by land-based bombers sank both of her accompanying troop ships, prompting Amatsukaze to rescue survivors and return to Hong Kong.

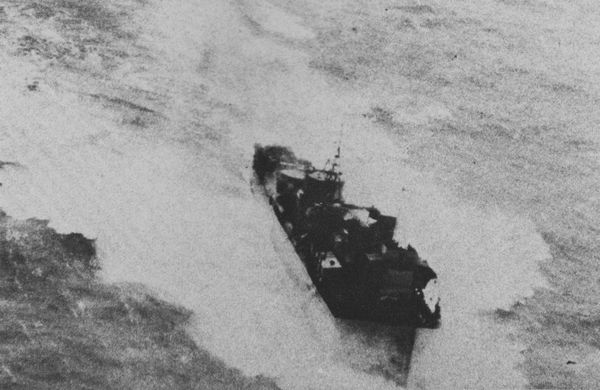
Amatsukaze under air attacks during her final battle, April 6th 1945

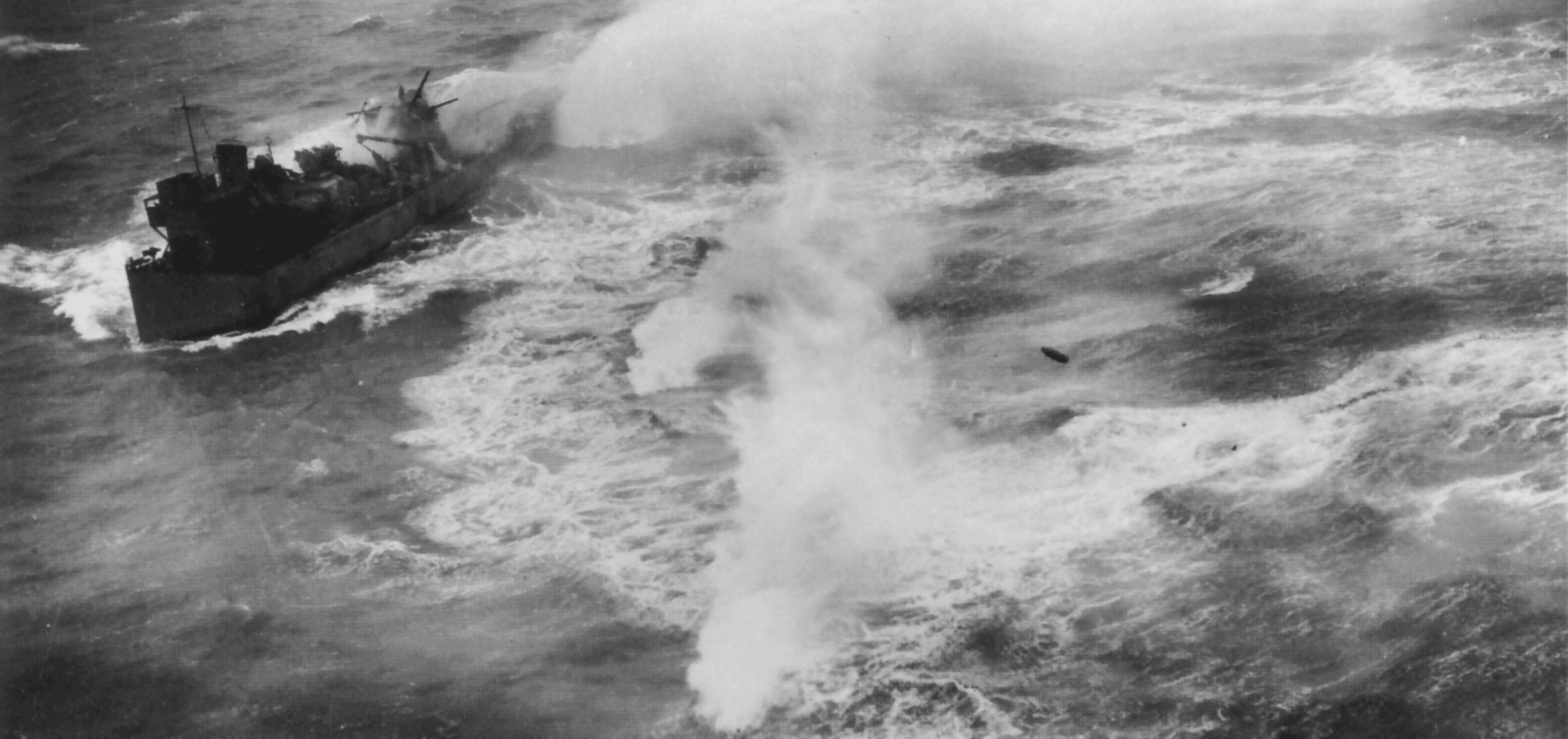
Aftermath of a bomb hit that destroyed Amatsukaze's aft turrets

The very next day, Amatsukaze departed Hong Kong for the final time alongside the submarine chasers CD-1 and CD-134 in yet another desperate attempt to arrive at mainland Japan. However, the convoy was immediately spotted and attacked by several land-based American aircraft. Amatsukaze successfully dodged the first two waves of attacks, but both CD-1 and CD-134 were sunk with ease, leaving Amatsukaze as the lone target for the remaining formations, and when a third wave of planes attacked, a bomb exploded in between her aft turrets, taking both of Amatsukaze's only effective AA weapons out of action, which had managed to shoot down 3 aircraft and damage 2 more. Another wave of aircraft hit Amatsukaze with two more bombs in her axillary machinery room and radio room, setting the ship on fire and limiting her speed. However, the half destroyer continued on as damage control quickly put the fires out and attempted to make it look like the ship was already sinking to avoid further air attacks. However, this attempted disguise failed to fool the enemy as a final wave of aircraft hit Amatsukaze with a bomb in her wardroom and several rockets, resetting the ship on fire and leaving her dead in the water with a loss of all power.

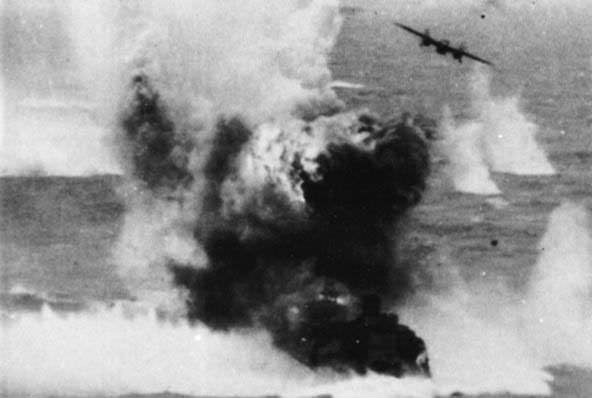
Amatsukaze being set on fire to another bomb hit

However, in a last gasp of breath, the crew temporarily got Amatsukaze moving at 6 knots, and beached the ship off China to avoid fully sinking. Despite being hit by at least 4 bombs and several rockets, only 9 crew members were killed. The next day, Chinese pirates attempted to raid the hulked Amatsukaze, killing another sailor, but machine gunfire killed most of the pirates and warded off the rest. Assisted by army boats, the crew attempted to refloat Amatsukaze after temporary repairs were conducted, but this could not be done. On the 10th, the hulked Amatsukaze was finally scuttled, bringing an end to the legendary destroyer's career.

In 2012, the wreckage of Amatsukaze was found by a Chinese engineering ship. About 30 tons of the wreckage was salvaged, cut into pieces and sold as scrap metal before the intervention of local relics administration departments. According to Chinese media, a museum will be built to protect the remaining wreckage.

== In popular culture ==
Amatsukaze has received praise in several American and Japanese history books for her notable role in the naval battle of Guadalcanal, survival after being blown in half, and final stand against overwhelming forces.

Two notable books were written about Amatsukaze by her former crew members. The first and most famous would be none other than Captain Hara, who survived the war, having gained even more fame for taking charge of the fortune destroyer Shigure throughout many of her most notable actions and taking command of the light cruiser Yahagi during Operation Ten Go, surviving the cruiser's sinking to American carrier aircraft. In 1961, he published his autobiography "Japanese Destroyer Captain", with Chapters 9-23 being dedicated to his time as captain of the Amatsukaze and detailing her battles and victories under his command.

The second book would be "25-Year-Old Captain's Naval Battle Chronicles: Destroyer Amatsukaze", written by Captain Tomoyuki Morita, who survived Amatsukaze's final battle with American aircraft, detailing his extensive career before his time aboard the Amatsukaze and his attempts to bring the half destroyer to mainland Japan, culminating in her sinking.

== Bibliography ==
- Hara, Capt. Tameichi (1961). Japanese Destroyer Captain. New York: Ballantine Books. ISBN 0-345-02522-9. SBN 345-02522-9-125.
- Jentschura, Hansgeorg; Jung, Dieter & Mickel, Peter (1977). Warships of the Imperial Japanese Navy, 1869–1945. Annapolis, Maryland: United States Naval Institute. ISBN 0-87021-893-X.
- Sturton, Ian (1980). "Japan". In Chesneau, Roger (ed.). Conway's All the World's Fighting Ships 1922–1946. Greenwich, UK: Conway Maritime Press. pp. 167–217. ISBN 0-85177-146-7.
- Whitley, M. J. (2000). Destroyers of World War Two: An International Encyclopedia. London: Cassell & Co. ISBN 1-85409-521-8.
- Williams, Michael (2018). "Amatsukaze: A Destroyer's Struggle". In Jordan, John (ed.). Warship 2018. Oxford, UK: Osprey. pp. 174–189. ISBN 978-1-4728-2999-3.
- Masataka Chiyaka; Yasuo Abe (1972). Warship Profile 22; IJN Yukikaze/Destroyer/1939-1970. Profile Publications Ltd.
- Morison, Samuel Eliot (1958). "The Naval Battle of Guadalcanal, 12–15 November 1942". The Struggle for Guadalcanal, August 1942 – February 1943, vol. 5 of History of United States Naval Operations in World War II. Boston: Little, Brown and Company. ISBN 978-0-316-58305-3.
- Masataka Chiyaka; Yasuo Abe (1972). Warship Profile 22; IJN Yukikaze/Destroyer/1939-1970. Profile Publications Ltd.
