= USS Douglas H. Fox =

Allen M. Sumner-class destroyer

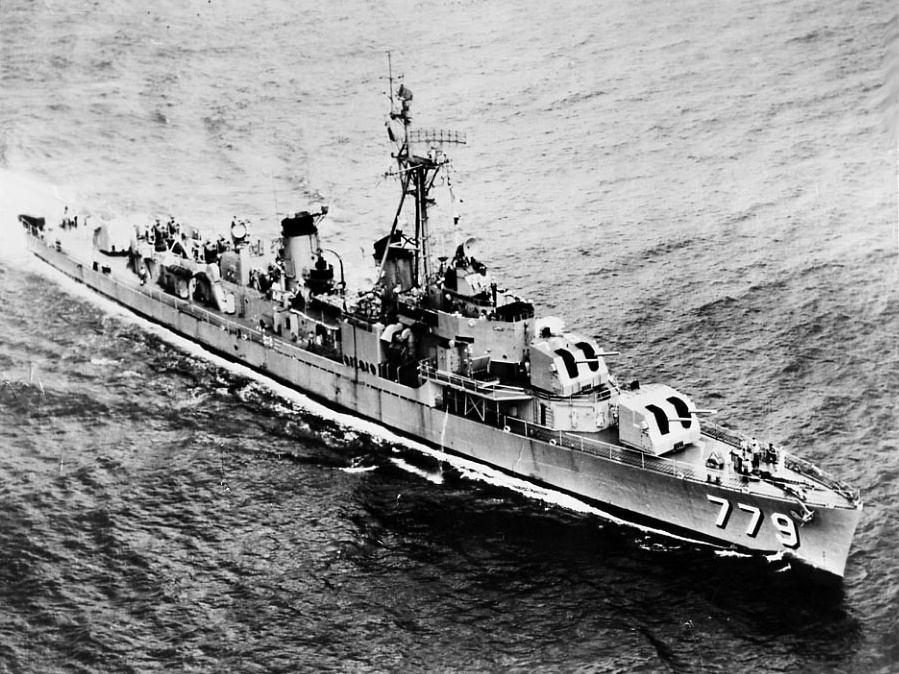
- USS Douglas H. Fox (DD-779) underway in the 1950s

History

United States
- Name: USS Douglas H. Fox
- Namesake: Douglas H. Fox
- Builder: Todd Pacific Shipyards, Seattle
- Laid down: 31 January 1944
- Launched: 30 September 1944
- Commissioned: 26 December 1944
- Decommissioned: 15 December 1973
- Stricken: 15 December 1973
- Fate: To Chile 8 January 1974

Chile
- Name: Ministro Portales
- Acquired: 8 January 1974
- Identification: DD-17
- Fate: Scuttled off Cape Horn on 11 November 1998

General characteristics
- Class & type: Allen M. Sumner-class destroyer
- Displacement: 2,200 long tons (2,235 t)
- Length: 376 ft 6 in (114.76 m)
- Beam: 40 ft (12 m)
- Draft: 15 ft 8 in (4.78 m)
- Propulsion: 60,000 shp (45,000 kW); 2 propellers
- Speed: 34 kn (63 km/h; 39 mph)
- Range: 6,500 nmi (12,000 km; 7,500 mi) at 15 kn (28 km/h; 17 mph)
- Complement: 336
- Armament: 6 × 5 in (130 mm)/38 guns; 12 × 40 mm AA guns; 11 × 20 mm AA guns; 10 × 21 inch (533 mm) torpedo tubes; 6 × depth charge projectors; 2 × depth charge tracks

USS Douglas H. Fox (DD-779) was an Allen M. Sumner-class destroyer of the United States Navy.

== Namesake ==
Douglas Harold Fox was born on 26 March 1905 in Walled Lake, Michigan. He attended Dowagiac High School in Dowagiac, Michigan, prior to entering the United States Naval Academy on 8 August 1922. He graduated from the United States Naval Academy on 3 June 1926, but remained there for the summer course in aviation through 11 August. His first tour of duty at sea took him to USS Seattle, reporting on board on 17 October 1926. He was detached from Seattle on 12 September 1927, and after two months at the Fifth Naval District at Norfolk, Virginia, joined the battleship USS New York on 5 November. On 17 June 1930, he reported on board the destroyer USS Claxton and from there transferred to USS Pope, serving on it on the Asiatic Station from 27 March 1931 to 15 May 1934). The next two years he trained reservists on board Eagle No. 32, attached to the Twelfth Naval District at San Francisco, California. Upon completing that tour, he travelled to Mare Island Navy Yard, reporting on board USS Preston on 24 July 1936 while it fitted out, and became the ship's gunnery officer upon its commissioning on 27 October 1936. From 5 June 1939 to 31 May 1940 he served as Prestons executive officer. For a couple of months following that assignment, Fox served at the Recruiting Training School at San Diego, California and then from 13 July 1940 to 13 March 1942 was officer in charge of the Naval Recruiting Station at Minneapolis, Minnesota. He briefly attended the Naval Fleet Sound School at Key West, Florida from 16 to 28 March 1942. On 1 April 1942, he reported to the Bethlehem Steel Co., at Quincy, Massachusetts where Lieutenant commander Fox was given command of the newly commissioned destroyer USS Barton on 29 May 1942. He went down with his ship when it was torpedoed and sunk in the Naval Battle of Guadalcanal on 13 November 1942. He was posthumously awarded the Navy Cross. He also later received an Award star in lieu of a second Navy Cross for earlier actions on 26 and 30 October and 3 November in which he had rescued downed aviators and survivors of USS Hornet under hazardous conditions.

== History ==
Douglas H. Fox was launched 30 September 1944 by Todd-Pacific Shipyards, Inc., Seattle, Washington; sponsored by Mrs. J. T. Boone; and commissioned 26 December 1944.

=== United States Navy ===
==== 1945-1946 ====
===== Okinawa =====
Douglas H. Fox joined in exercises in the Hawaiian Islands from 31 March 1945 to 21 April 1945, then sailed to join the radar picket line at Okinawa, arriving 5 May 1945. She accounted for 7 planes during a concentrated attack by 11 enemy planes, splashed 5 of her attackers before being hit by a kamikaze and its bomb, and sprayed with gasoline from 1 of her own victims. Although 7 of her crew were killed and 35 wounded, the fires were quickly extinguished and effective damage control measures enabled Fox to reach Kerama Retto under her own power for temporary repairs. She continued to San Francisco for permanent repairs, arriving 23 June.

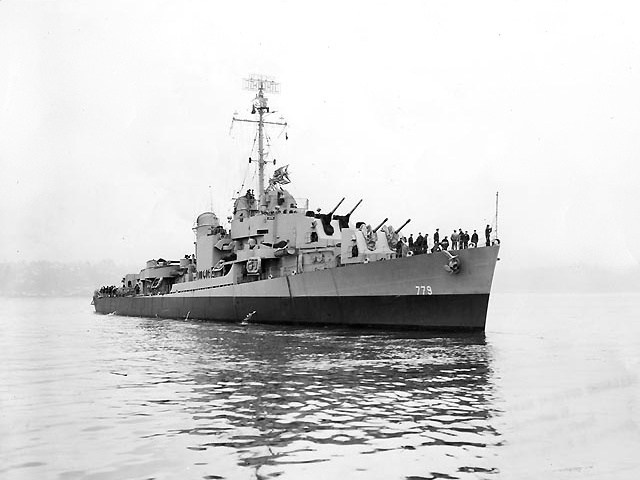
Douglas H. Fox in March 1945.

===== Return to the US, Atlantic Duty =====
After refresher training at San Diego, Fox sailed on 30 September 1945 for the East Coast, arriving at New York City 17 October 1945 for the Navy Day celebrations. She put in at her home port of Norfolk, Virginia 2 November 1945 and served on local operations and plane guard duty in the Caribbean. She aided in the shakedown of the aircraft carrier USS Franklin D. Roosevelt from 14 January 1945 to 6 March 1946, visiting Rio de Janeiro in February. Fox remained in the Caribbean in various training and escort duties until 14 December 1946 when she arrived at New London for leave and upkeep.

==== 1947-1962 ====
Douglas H. Fox departed Norfolk 21 July 1947 for a tour of duty in the Mediterranean. On 29 September, while bound for Trieste, she struck a World War II era mine which severely damaged her stern, killed 3 and injured 12 of her crew. She was towed to Venice by two Italian tugs, and put to sea on 13 November 1947 in tow by USS Luiseno for Boston, arriving 5 December 1947, for repairs.

Sailing from Newport, Rhode Island, 20 July 1948, Fox returned to the Mediterranean and visited various ports there until 28 September 1948, when she joined the cruiser USS Huntington for a goodwill cruise to Mombasa, Kenya; Durban, South Africa; and round Cape Horn to Buenos Aires, Rio de Janeiro, and Montevideo. She returned to Norfolk 8 December 1948, for operations off the Virginia Capes until 5 January 1950 when she arrived at Charleston, South Carolina. She was placed out of commission in reserve there 21 April 1950.

Recommissioned 15 November 1950, after the outbreak of war in Korea, Fox served on the East Coast until 22 January 1952 when she got underway from Norfolk for the Far East. She joined the screen of TF 77 on patrol off Korea, and participated in the bombardment of Wonsan 13 March 1952. Later in March, she joined the cruiser USS Manchester in conducting harassing fire against enemy troops on the east coast of Korea. In May she began independent operations, shelling targets, supporting minesweeping operations, and weakening the North Korean fishing industry by capturing 26 sampans. She got underway from Yokosuka 21 June 1952, and sailed west through the Indian Ocean and the Mediterranean Sea to complete a round-the-world cruise at Norfolk 19 August 1952, this time in a reverse direction.

Fox made a midshipman training cruise to Nova Scotia from 20 June to 8 July 1955, and served tours of duty with the 6th Fleet in the Mediterranean from 7 November 1956 to 20 February 1957. Between 3 September and 22 December 1957, she joined elements of the British and Canadian navies for a NATO exercise in the North Atlantic, visiting the Mediterranean before returning to Norfolk to resume local operations. Between 7 August 1959 and 26 February 1960, she served again in the Mediterranean, as well as in the Red Sea and Persian Gulf, returning to Norfolk for overhaul. From June through the end of 1960, H. Fox operated off the East Coast, cruising north of the Arctic Circle on NATO maneuvers, and patrolling in the Caribbean during political unrest in Central America.

After completing a 1961 Mediterranean deployment, Fox participated in anti-submarine warfare (ASW) exercises and patrols through March 1962. At that time the ship went into the Norfolk Naval Shipyard for a FRAM II (Fleet Rehabilitation and Modernization) conversion. Included in the changes were updated torpedo mounts, and a Drone Anti-Submarine Helicopter (DASH) and Variable-Depth Sonar (VDS) system. In November 1962, she departed from the yard with this increased ASW capability, more modern and comfortable quarters, and a longer life expectancy with the United States Navy.

==== 1963-1973 ====
In December 1962, Douglas H. Fox reported to the Fleet Training Group at Guantánamo Bay, Cuba for refresher training and base defense. In February and March 1963, the ship took part in Operation Springboard - 63, an extensive training cruise in the Caribbean, after which she resumed her ASW ready duties with the Atlantic Fleet. Early July 1964 found Fox deployed to the Mediterranean, returning in November. In early 1965, she took part in Operation Springboard-65, after which she resumed her ASW duties with Task Group Four.

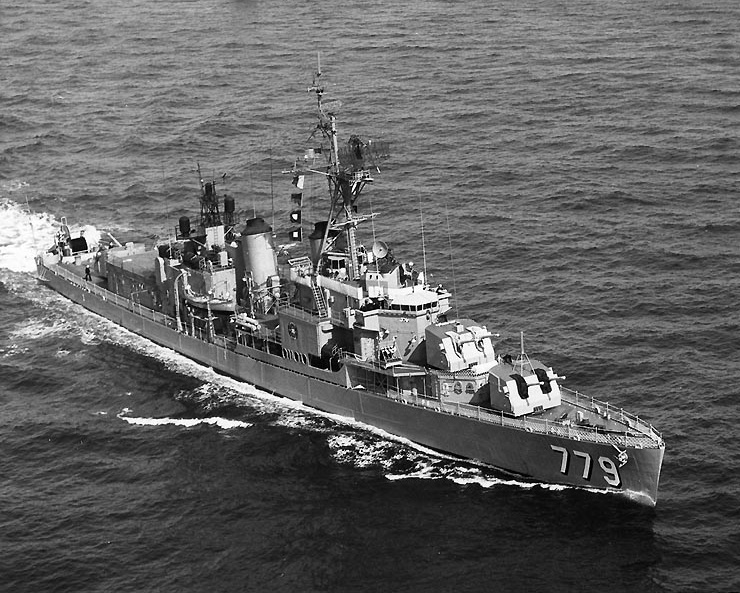
Douglas H. Fox after her FRAM II-modernization.

Summer 1965 found Fox deployed to the Mediterranean and Middle East, where she conducted ASW operations with the Royal Navy and then participated in contingency operations off the coast of Pakistan. During this period, Fox received the Atlantic Fleet ASW Award for her consistent success in the art of anti-submarine warfare. From November 1965 to April 1966 she was in Norfolk Naval Shipyard undergoing overhaul.

In July 1966, she returned to the Mediterranean and paid a visit to Safi, Morocco. Fox was the first American warship to visit Safi in seventeen years. The ship returned to Norfolk 17 December 1966, and in 1967 the ship performed a variety of work with the Second Fleet, with the major emphasis on anti-submarine warfare. Much time was spent in this period in areas just east of Cape Hatteras.

In May 1967, Fox operated with 55 ships from four countries in Operation Fizwiz Sunrise. In June, a NATO exercise called New Look took the ship to the North Atlantic for ten days of highly competitive ASW operations with the Royal Canadian Navy. In addition, there were two weeks of operations out of Key West as a school ship for the Fleet Sonar School. On 1 September 1967 the ship began a five-month deployment with the 6th Fleet in the Mediterranean.

In September 1968, 323 miles southeast of Charleston, South Carolina, while en route to Vietnam, a flashback fire in the aft fireroom erupted, killing three seamen and injuring five. The fire was brought under control and the ship returned to port on one engine. After extensive repairs were completed at Charleston Naval Shipyard, Fox departed again for Vietnam arriving in February 1969. From February to September, she operated in the Vietnam area on a variety of assignments which included plane-guarding in the Tonkin Gulf, and harassment and interdiction fire on a regular basis. She also operated independently providing close-in gunfire support to troops on numerous occasions.

=== Chilean Navy ===
On 15 December 1973, Douglas H. Fox was given orders to proceed to the Navy Yard at Philadelphia to be decommissioned. After decommissioning, the ship was sold to Chile for further naval service. Under a different flag and with a new name, Ministro Portales (DD-17) served its new country for another 22 years. Between 1975 and 1976 she was refitted with an extension in the flight deck. Ministro Portales participated in the Beagle-Channel diplomatic conflict in 1978. in this period, all the Chilean navy ships were camouflaged. This ship was decommissioned from the Chilean Navy in 1990. Ministro Portales was sunk off Cape Horn on 11 November 1998 at 15:47 hours (Chilean time).

== Awards ==
Douglas H. Fox received one battle star for World War II service and one for Korean War service.
