= USS Redfin =

Submarine of the United States

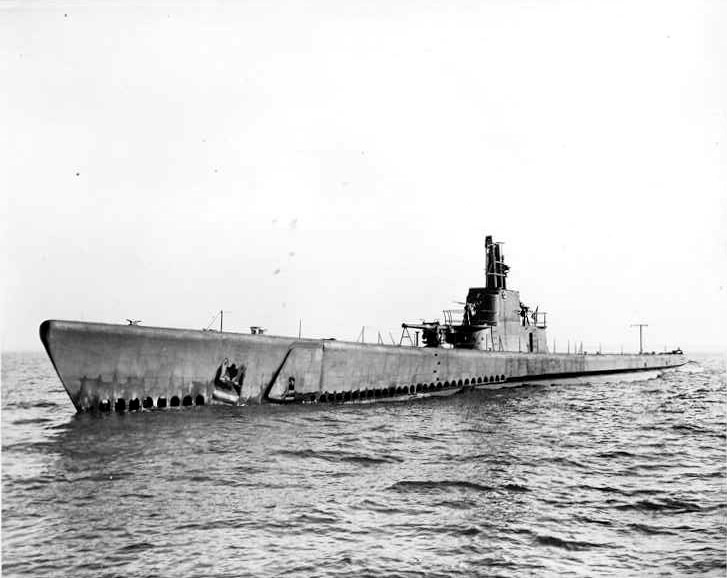
- Redfin (SS-272), April 1943 on Lake Michigan.

History

United States
- Name: USS Redfin
- Namesake: Redfin shiner
- Builder: Manitowoc Shipbuilding Company, Manitowoc, Wisconsin
- Laid down: 3 September 1942
- Launched: 4 April 1943
- Sponsored by: Mrs. B. B. Wygant
- Commissioned: 31 August 1943
- Decommissioned: 1 November 1946
- Recommissioned: 9 January 1953
- Decommissioned: 15 May 1967
- Stricken: 1 July 1970
- Fate: Sold for scrap, 31 March 1971

General characteristics
- Class & type: Gato-class diesel-electric submarine
- Displacement: 1,525 tons (1,549 t) surfaced; 2,424 tons (2,460 t) submerged
- Length: 311 ft 9 in (95.02 m)
- Beam: 27 ft 3 in (8.31 m)
- Draft: 17 ft 0 in (5.18 m) maximum
- Propulsion: 4 × General Motors Model 16-248 V16 Diesel engines driving electric generators; 2 × 126-cell Sargo batteries; 4 × high-speed General Electric electric motors with reduction gears; two propellers; 5,400 shp (4.0 MW) surfaced; 2,740 shp (2.0 MW) submerged
- Speed: 21 knots (39 km/h) surfaced; 9 knots (17 km/h) submerged
- Range: 11,000 NM (20,000 km) surfaced at 10 knots (19 km/h)
- Endurance: 48 hours at 2 knots (3.7 km/h) submerged; 75 days on patrol
- Test depth: 300 ft (90 m)
- Complement: 6 officers, 54 enlisted
- Armament: 10 × 21-inch (533 mm) torpedo tubes; 6 forward, 4 aft; 24 torpedoes; 1 × 3-inch (76 mm) / 50 caliber deck gun; Bofors 40 mm and Oerlikon 20 mm cannon

USS Redfin (SS/SSR/AGSS-272), a Gato-class submarine, was a ship of the United States Navy named for the redfin.

== Construction and commissioning ==
Redfin was laid down 16 February 1942 by Manitowoc Shipbuilding Co., Manitowoc, Wisconsin; launched on 4 April 1943, sponsored by Mrs. B. B. Wygant; and commissioned on 31 August 1943.

== Service history ==
=== World War II ===
==== First war patrol, January – March 1944 ====
Departing New Orleans 15 October 1943, Redfin proceeded to Fremantle, Australia. On her first war patrol 4 January to 17 February 1944, she encountered an enemy convoy of four ships in the South China Sea 16 January and damaged the Imperial Japanese Navy destroyer Amatsukaze. From 8 March to 14 March, she patrolled north of Australia to defend against a possible Japanese attack.

==== Second war patrol, March – May 1944 ====
On her second war patrol 19 March to 1 May, Redfin sank the 1,900-ton Japanese destroyer Akigumo off Zamboanga, Mindanao, 11 April. During the night of 15 April – 16 April, she sank two Japanese passenger-cargo ships, Shinyu Maru, 4,621 tons, and Yamagata Maru, 3,807 tons. On the night of 22 April – 23 April, she landed four of her crew near Dent Haven, Borneo, to evacuate a British reconnaissance party. Attacked by the Japanese, the landing party returned to Redfin, but the British agents were later evacuated by an Australian officer, and transferred to Harder (SS-257).

==== Third war patrol, May – July 1944 ====
On her third war patrol, 26 May to 1 July, she landed six Philippine guerrillas on a small island near Balabac Strait 8 June. Proceeding to scout the enemy naval base at Tawi Tawi, she sank the 5,142-ton Japanese tanker Asanagi Maru on 11 June. She also warned American forces in the Marianas of the departure from Tawi Tawi of the Japanese task force that was later defeated in the Battle of the Philippine Sea on 19 June and 20 June. Operating off Leyte on 24 June, she sank the 3,028-ton Japanese passenger-cargo ship Aso Maru, before returning to Fremantle.

==== Fourth, fifth, and sixth war patrols, August 1944 – September 1945 ====
Departing Fremantle 6 August, she laid a minefield off the west coast of Borneo on 19 August and rescued eight survivors of Flier (SS-250) at Palawan Island on 30 August. After lifeguard duty for airstrikes against Balikpapan, Borneo, she departed Fremantle 26 October, and sank the 15,226-ton Japanese tanker Nichinan Maru No. 2 west of the Philippines 8 November.

Completing her fourth war patrol 7 January 1945, she proceeded to Mare Island Naval Shipyard, San Francisco Bay, California, where she received special mine detection gear. Underway from Pearl Harbor 30 May to 10 July, and later from 30 July to 5 September she made mine surveys first off Honshū and Hokkaidō, and later off Kyūshū, Japan.

=== Radar picket submarine, 1953–1959 ===
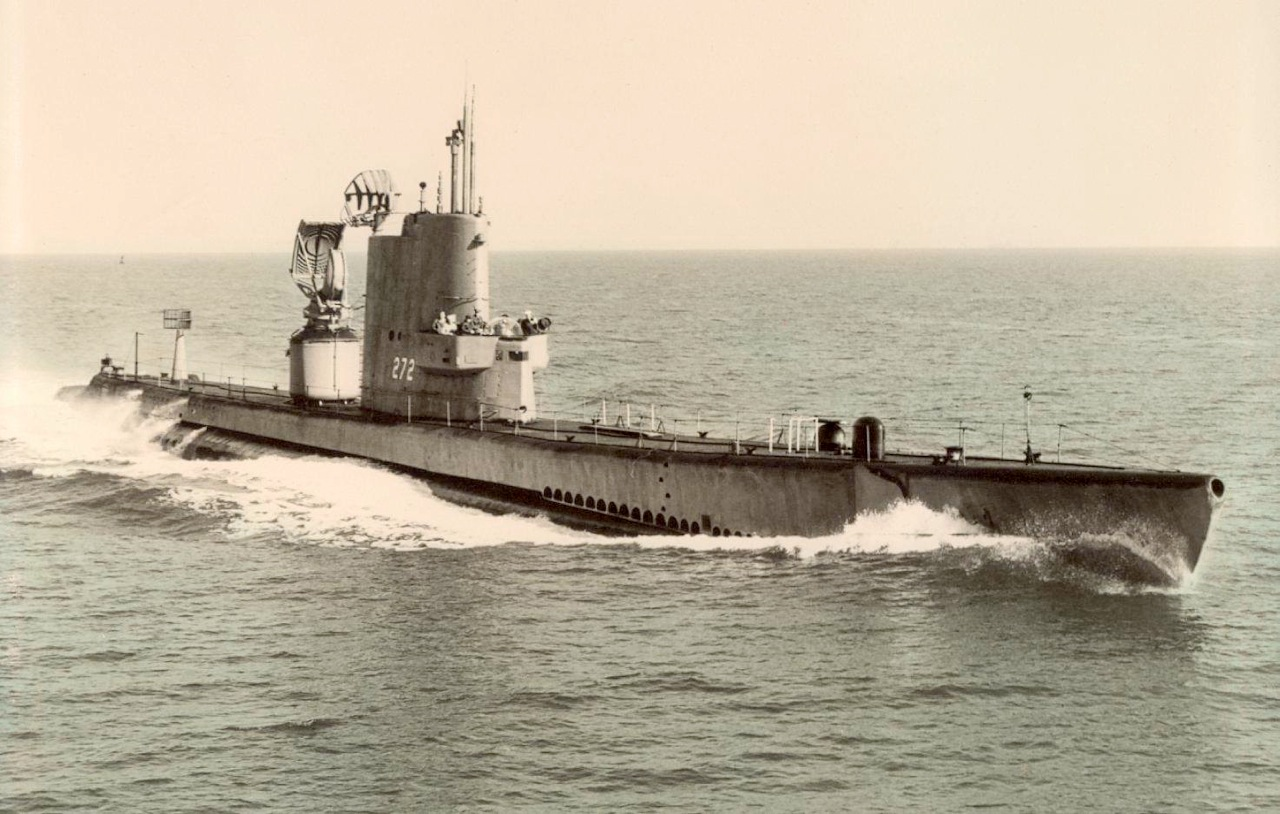
Redfin (SSR-272) as a radar picket submarine.

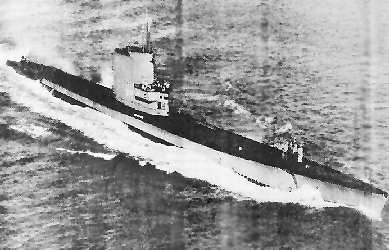
Redfin (SSR-272), c. 1963.

Decommissioned at New London, Conn., 1 November 1946, she entered the Philadelphia Naval Shipyard in April 1951 for conversion, and was reclassified SSR-272. Recommissioned 9 January 1953, she engaged in radar picket duty for the next 6 years in American coastal waters, off northern Europe, and in the Mediterranean.

=== Auxiliary research submarine, 1959–1967 ===
In April 1959 she entered the Philadelphia Naval Shipyard, and received an inertial guidance system. Redfin became a laboratory and training ship for the testing of inertial guidance systems used in Polaris submarines. She preceded the first ballistic missile submarine George Washington (SSBN-598) as flagship of Submarine Squadron 14.

After searching for the lost submarine Thresher (SSN-593) in April 1963, she was reclassified as an auxiliary submarine, AGSS-272, on 28 June 1963. Operating in the Atlantic, she continued to assist in special research and development projects, including of the Polaris A-3 submarine-launched ballistic missile.

== Decommissioning and disposal ==
Redfin decommissioned on 15 May 1967 to become a United States Naval Reserve Training Ship at Baltimore, Maryland. She was struck from the Navy List on 1 July 1970 and sold to the North American Smelting Company of Wilmington, Delaware, on 3 March 1971 for scrapping.

== Awards ==
- Asiatic–Pacific Campaign Medal with six battle stars
- World War II Victory Medal
- Navy Occupation Medal
- National Defense Service Medal with one service star
