= SS Plancius =

Dutch passenger ship that became a Submarine depot ship in WW2

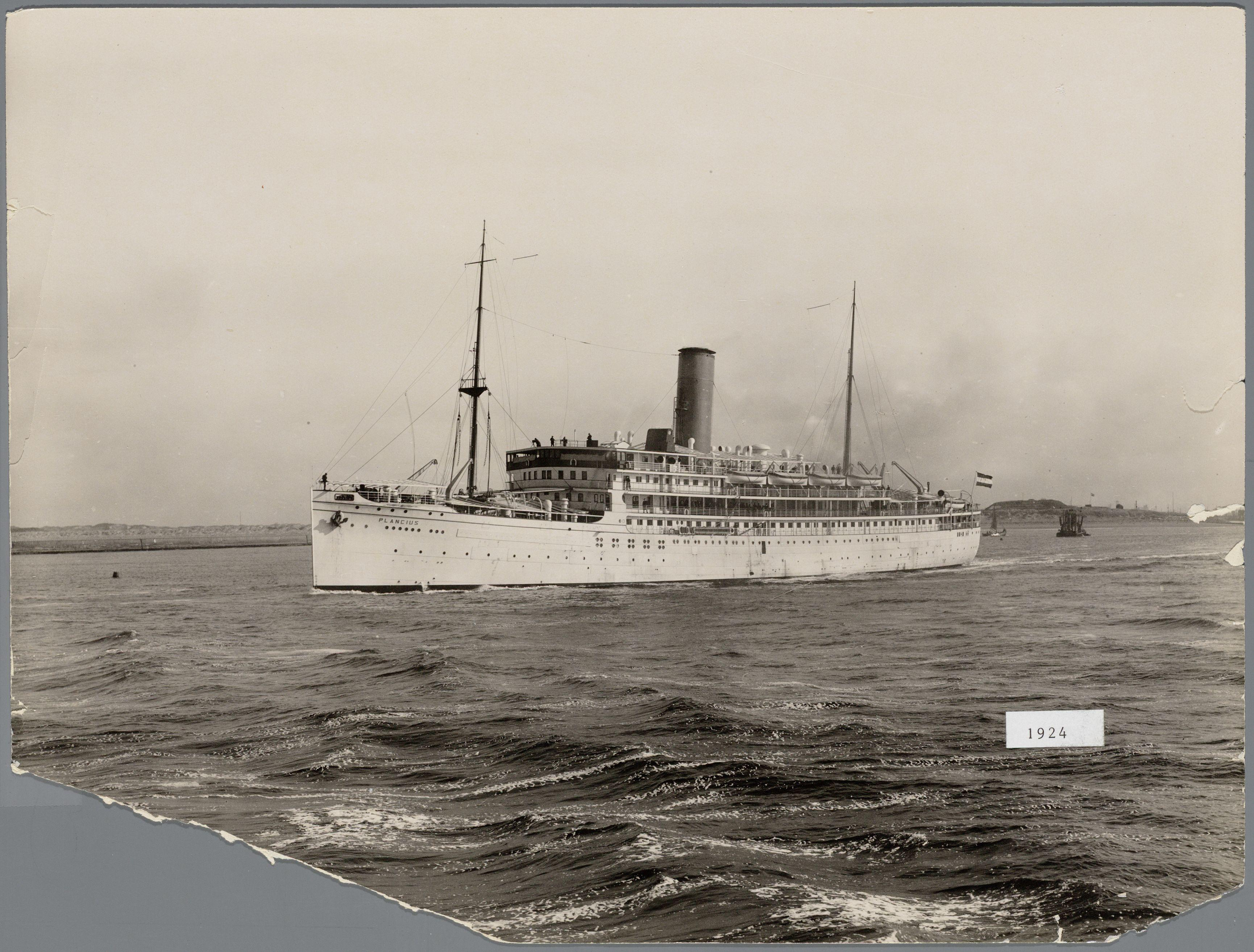
- Plancius in 1924 as a passenger ship

History
- Name: Plancius
- Namesake: Petrus Plancius
- Owner: Koninklijke Paketvaart-Mij
- Operator: 1924: Koninklijke Paketvaart-Mij; 1942: Royal Netherlands Navy
- Port of registry: 1924: (Netherlands) Batavia
- Route: Dutch East Indies
- Builder: Nederlandsche SM, Amsterdam
- Yard number: 166
- Launched: 1922
- Completed: 3 March 1924
- Commissioned: 9 April 1942 as submarine depot ship
- Reclassified: 1942 as submarine depot ship
- Fate: sold in 1958 for scrapping to a company in Hong Kong

General characteristics
- Type: Passenger ship
- Displacement: 5,955 long tons (6,051 t)
- Length: 128.11 m (420 ft 4 in)
- Beam: 16.83 m (55 ft 3 in)
- Decks: 3
- Installed power: 5,800 ihp (4,300 kW)
- Propulsion: 2 × screws; 2 × Werkspoor quadruple expansion steam engines
- Speed: 15.5 knots (28.7 km/h; 17.8 mph)
- Boats & landing craft carried: 12 × lifeboats; 2 × dinghies
- Crew: 363 during war operations
- Armament: Installed after militarization: 1 × 7.5 cm (3.0 in) cannon; 2 × 20 mm (0.79 in) Oerlikon cannon; 4 x 12.7 mm (0.50 in) machine guns; 6 x 7.7 mm (0.30 in) machine guns

SS Plancius was a passenger steamship that was launched in the Netherlands in 1922. She was built for the Koninklijke Paketvaart-Maatschappij (KPM, the "Royal Packet Navigation Company"), who operated her in the Dutch East Indies. Plancius was named after Petrus Plancius, a famous Dutch-Flemish astronomer, cartographer and clergyman.

In 1942, after the fall of Java, the Royal Netherlands Navy requisitioned her, initially to serve as a command ship for the navy in Ceylon. After the loss of the former MS Columbia however, it was decided to convert Plancius into a submarine tender.

== Building ==
In the 1920s Nederlandsche Scheepsbouw Maatschappij in Amsterdam built a pair of passenger ships for KPM. The first was built as yard number 166 and launched in September 1923 as Plancius. The vessel was completed in February 1924, entering service from 3 March that year. A sister ship was built as yard number 185, launched on 12 February 1927 as Op Ten Noort, and completed in August 1927.

Both Plancius and Op Ten Noort had twin screws. However, Plancius had a pair of conventional quadruple-expansion engines, Op Ten Noort had a pair of four-cylinder compound engines built by Werkspoor. Plancius had a maximum speed of 15.5 knots (28.7 km/h; 17.8 mph).

== Service history ==
Plancius served from 1924 until the start of World War II in the Pacific Ocean as a passenger, mail and cargo transport ship. From the outbreak of hostilities between Japan and the Netherlands, Plancius served in a passenger transport role where the ship transferred German prisoners of war from Java to Bombay, and evacuated personnel from the Dutch East Indies to Australia before retreating to Ceylon.

Once arrived in Ceylon the ship was militarized by the Royal Netherlands Navy to serve as a command ship for Vice-Admiral Helfrich and the rest of navy command. Upon the loss of the submarine tender HNLMS Columbia, HNLMS Plancius was converted and served as a submarine tender in its place. Throughout the war the ship frequently serviced Royal Netherlands Navy, Royal Navy and even Italian Navy submarines later in the war.

Plancius was returned to the KPM in 1946 after which it served as a passenger ship until being sold to a scrapping company in Hong Kong in 1958.

== Bibliography ==
Media related to Plancius (ship, 1924) at Wikimedia Commons

- Hardy, AC (1954) [1948]. Modern Marine Engineering. Vol. I (revised ed.). London: Caxton Publishing.
- Lloyd's Register of British and Foreign Shipping. Vol. II – Steamers and Motorships. London: Lloyd's Register of Shipping. 1928 – via Internet Archive.
- Lloyd's Register of Shipping (PDF). Vol. II – Steamers and Motorships of 300 Tons Gross and Over. London: Lloyd's Register of Shipping. 1934 – via Southampton City Council.
