= Chilean destroyer Ministro Portales =

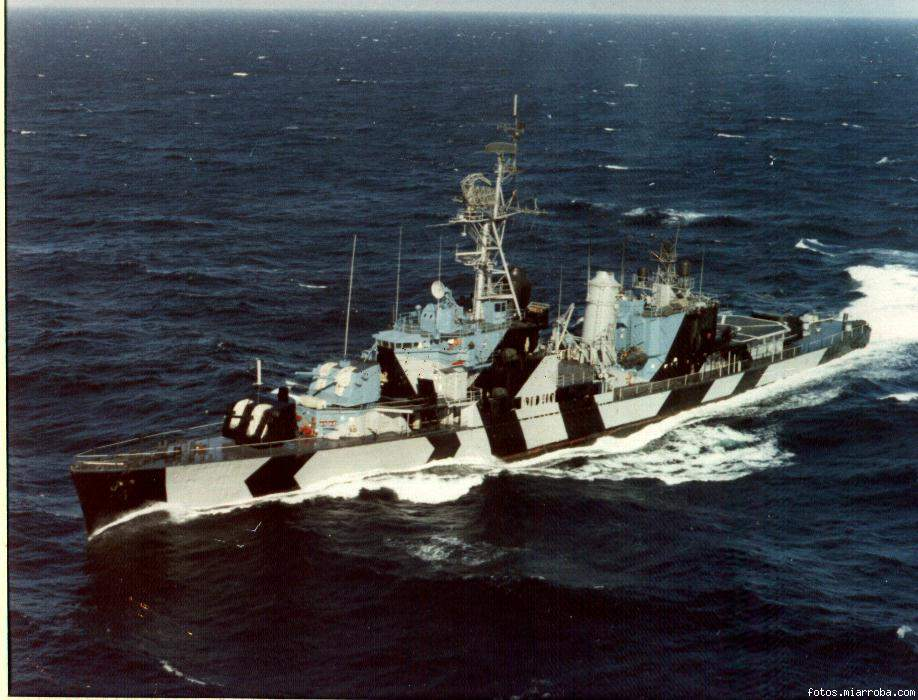
- Destroyer Ministro Portales ready to combat the Argentinians in 1978.

History

United States
- Name: USS Douglas H. Fox
- Namesake: Douglas H. Fox
- Builder: Todd Pacific Shipyards, Seattle
- Laid down: 31 January 1944
- Launched: 30 September 1944
- Commissioned: 26 December 1944
- Decommissioned: 15 December 1973
- Stricken: December 15, 1973
- Fate: To Chile 8 January 1974

Chile
- Name: Ministro Portales
- Acquired: 8 January 1974
- Identification: DD-17
- Fate: Used as a target ship off Cape Horn on 11 November 1998

General characteristics
- Class & type: Allen M. Sumner-class destroyer
- Displacement: 2,200 tons
- Length: 376 ft 6 in (114.76 m)
- Beam: 40 ft (12 m)
- Draft: 15 ft 8 in (4.78 m)
- Propulsion: 60,000 shp (45,000 kW); 2 propellers
- Speed: 34 knots (63 km/h; 39 mph)
- Range: 6,500 nmi (12,000 km) at 15 knots (28 km/h)
- Complement: 336
- Armament: 6 × 5 in/38 guns; 12 × 40 mm AA guns, 11 × 20 mm AA guns, 10 × 21 in torpedo tubes, 6 × depth charge projectors, 2 × depth charge tracks

Ministro Portales was a Allen M. Sumner-class destroyer purchased by Chile in 1974 from the United States that had been upgraded to FRAM II. Built and commissioned as USS Douglas H. Fox (DD-779) in 1944, the ship saw service during World War II and the Korean War. Between 1975 and 1976, the vessel was refitted with an extension on the flight deck for Alouette-III Helicopters.

Ministro Portales participated in the counteractive measures to the Operation Soberanía during the Beagle conflict in 1978. In this period, all the Chilean navy ships were camouflaged.

The vessel served the navy of Chile until it was taken off active duty and towed from Talcahuano to Puerto Williams, arriving at the wharf on 18 September 1991. There, it was a static support vessel for the local torpedo boat fleet until their replacement by missile boats.

On 11 November 1998, Ministro Portales was used as a target and sunk during a practice exercise.
