= SS Op Ten Noort =

Dutch passenger ship that became a hospital ship and was captured by Japan

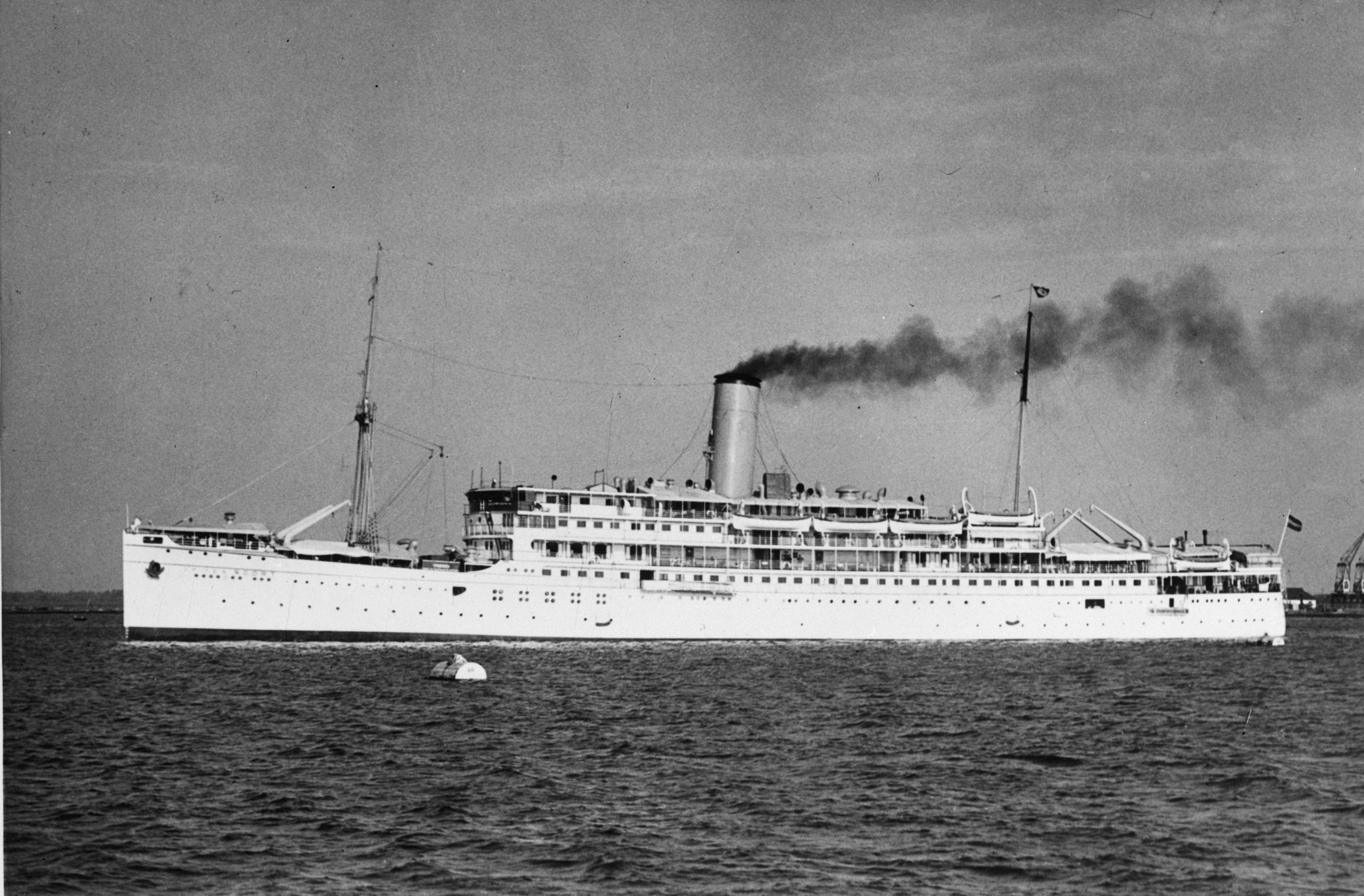
- Op Ten Noort as a passenger ship

History
- Name: 1927: Op Ten Noort; 1942: Tenno Maru; 1945: Hikawa Maru No.2
- Namesake: Laurens op Ten Noort; Emperor Circle; Hikawa Shrine
- Owner: Koninklijke Paketvaart-Mij
- Operator: 1927: Koninklijke Paketvaart-Mij; 1942: Royal Netherlands Navy; 1942: Kawasaki Kisen Kaisha; 1942: Imperial Japanese Navy
- Port of registry: 1927: (Netherlands) Batavia; 1942: (Japan) Tokyo
- Route: Dutch East Indies
- Builder: Nederlandsche SM, Amsterdam
- Yard number: 185
- Launched: February 12, 1927
- Completed: November 9, 1927
- Commissioned: February 14, 1942 as hospital ship
- Reclassified: 1942, as hospital ship
- Identification: code letters TFCQ (until 1933); call sign PKEA (1934 onward)
- Captured: February 28, 1942
- Fate: scuttled August 17, 1945

General characteristics
- Type: passenger ship
- Tonnage: 6,076 GRT, 3,566 NRT, 4,430 DWT
- Displacement: 6,076 long tons (6,174 t)
- Length: 424.5 ft (129.4 m)
- Beam: 55.2 ft (16.8 m)
- Depth: 22.2 ft (6.8 m)
- Decks: 3
- Installed power: 616 NHP, 6,000 ihp (4,500 kW)
- Propulsion: 2 × screws; 2 × Lentz compound engines
- Speed: 15 kn (28 km/h)
- Boats & landing craft carried: 12 × lifeboats; 2 × dinghies
- Capacity: passengers: 131 × 1st class, 52 × 2nd class, 2,457 × deck; cargo: 189,305 cu ft (5,360.5 m^{3}) bale
- Crew: 162
- Notes: sister ship: Plancius

SS Op Ten Noort was a passenger steamship that was launched in the Netherlands in 1927. She was built for the Koninklijke Paketvaart-Maatschappij (KPM, the "Royal Packet Navigation Company"), who operated her in the Dutch East Indies. Op Ten Noort was named after the founder of KPM, Laurens op ten Noort.

In 1941, the Royal Netherlands Navy requisitioned her to be converted into a hospital ship. In 1942 Japan captured her and renamed her Tenno Maru. In 1944 she was renamed Hikawa Maru No.2. She was scuttled just after the surrender of Japan in 1945.

== Building ==
In the 1920s Nederlandsche Scheepsbouw Maatschappij in Amsterdam built a pair of passenger ships for KPM. The first was built as yard number 166, launched in September 1923 as Plancius, and completed in February 1924. A sister ship was built as yard number 185, launched on 12 February 1927 as Op Ten Noort, and completed in August 1927. Op Ten Noort was named after the founder of KPM, Laurens op ten Noort.

Op Ten Noort's registered length was 424.5 ft (129.4 m), her beam was 55.2 ft (16.8 m) and her depth was 22.2 ft (6.8 m). Her tonnages were 6,076 GRT, 3,566 NRT, and 4,430 DWT. She had berths for 2,640 passengers: 131 in first class, 52 in second class, and 2,457 on deck.

Both Plancius and Op Ten Noort had twin screws. However, whereas Plancius had a pair of conventional quadruple-expansion engines, Op Ten Noort had a pair of four-cylinder compound engines built by Werkspoor. The engines were built to a patented design by Hugo Lentz, which includes radically improved valvegear. The combined power of Op Ten Noort's two engines was rated at 616 NHP or 6,000 ihp (4,500 kW), and gave her a speed of 15 knots (28 km/h).

== Civilian service ==
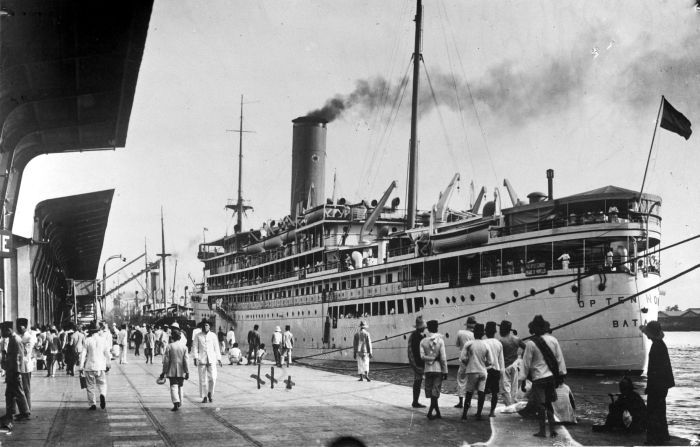
Op Ten Noort arriving in Tanjung Priok

KPM registered the ship at Batavia, Dutch East Indies, where the company was headquartered. Her code letters were TFCQ. She began her maiden voyage on November 9, 1927. She joined Plancius on the route from Singapore to Tanjung Priok via Bangkok, Saigon, Manila, the Maluku Islands, and Bali. In later years, KPM transferred Plancius and Op Ten Noort to serve the east coast of Java, from Batavia to Deli Serdang Regency via Muntok, Singapore and Belawan.

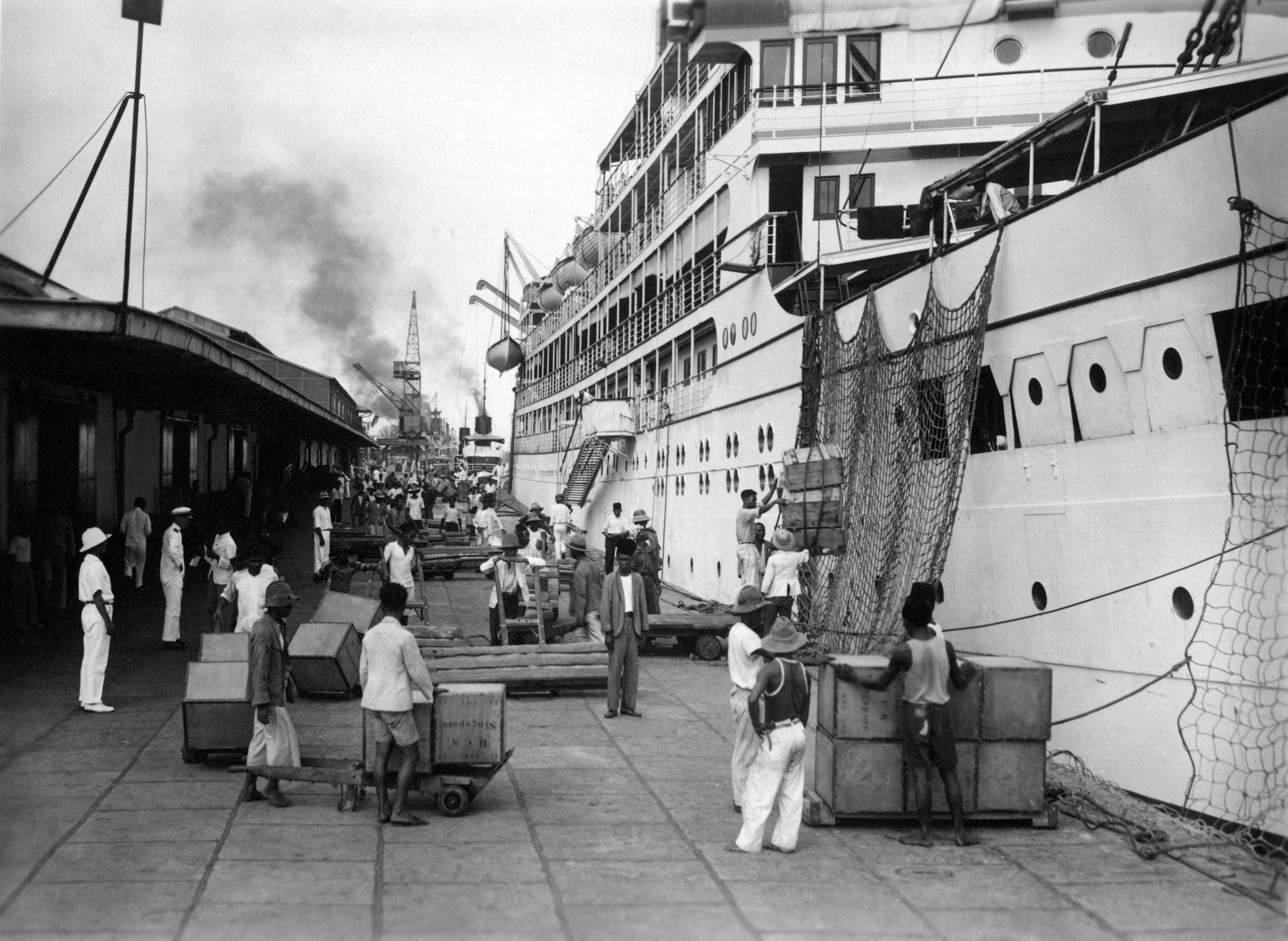
Op Ten Noort in the 1930s, probably in Belawan

Her first class cabins each had one or two berths. Her first class public areas included lounges, bars, a smoking room, and a tropical verandah. In 1933 part of her first class accommodation was converted into two two-person de luxe suites with a lounge, bedroom, two bathrooms, and private deck (veranda). She had 18 second class cabins, which had either two or four berths. Deck passengers were accommodated on her tweendeck, which had a lounge and a cafeteria.

In 1934 the call sign PKEA superseded her code letters.

== Hospital ship ==
On 8 December 1941 Japan invaded the Dutch East Indies. The Royal Dutch Navy requisitioned Op Ten Noort for conversion into a hospital ship. She was converted in the Dutch naval yard at Surabaya. On January 22, 1942 the Dutch Government notified the Japanese Ministry of Foreign Affairs via the Swedish Embassy in Tokyo of the ship's new status. On February 4, 1942 the Japanese Foreign Ministry and Naval Ministry acknowledged her status change via the Swedish Embassy.

The conversion was completed on February 19, and she started her first voyage as a hospital ship on February 21. Japan had signed the Hague Convention of 1907 that made attacking a hospital ship a war crime. However, when she was only a few hours out of port, Japanese aircraft bombed her in the Java Sea. One bomb hit her aft, and near misses by other bombs sprayed her with fragments that killed a surgeon, a nurse, and 12 other people. Another member of her medical staff died of wounds the next day. The Dutch Government sent a note of protest of the bombing to Japan via the Swedish Embassy.

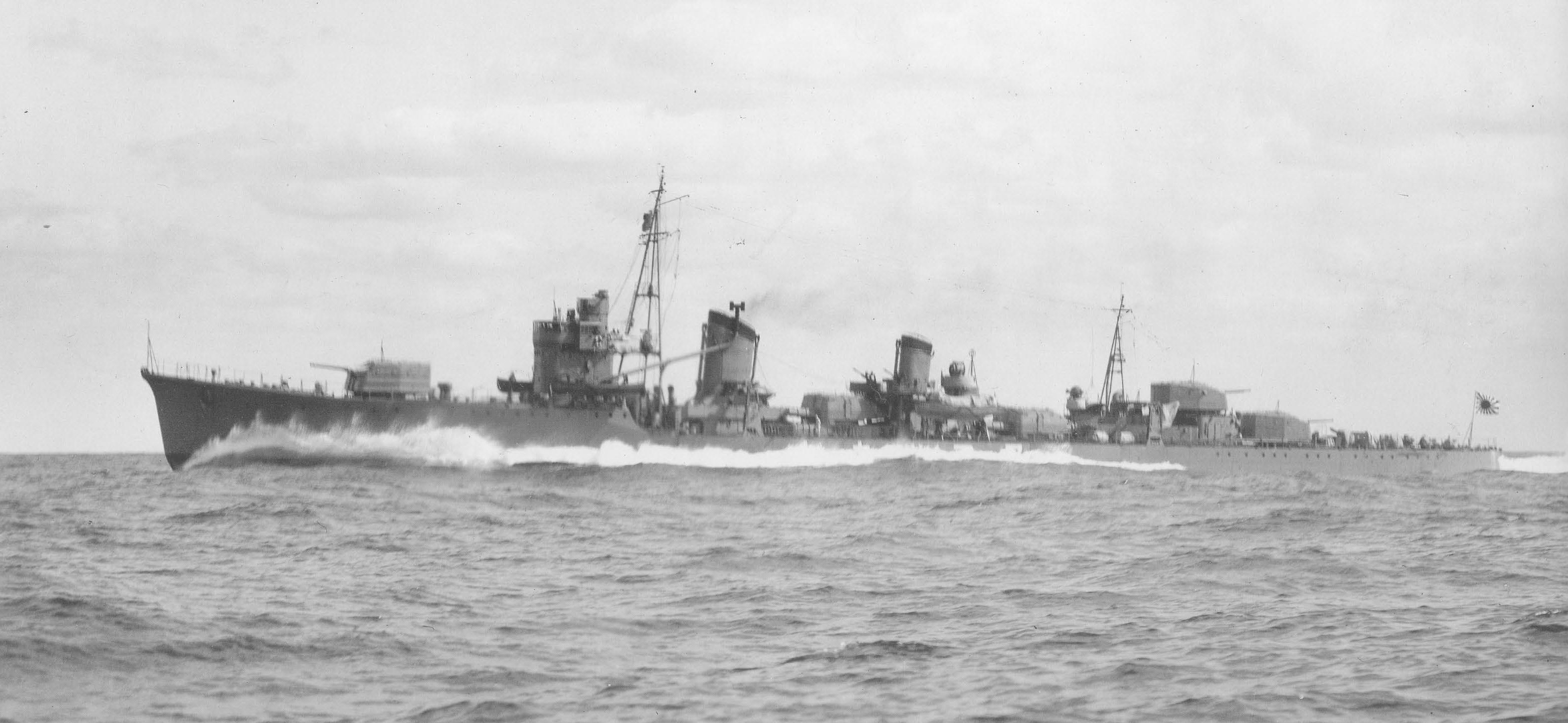
The Japanese destroyer Amatsukaze

In the Battle of the Java Sea on February 27, Japanese aircraft sank several Allied naval ships. At 01:00 hrs on February 28, the Australian cruiser HMAS Perth signalled that the Dutch cruisers HNLMS De Ruyter and Java were disabled. At 06:00 hrs Op Ten Noort was sent to rescue survivors. However, a Japanese light cruiser, and the destroyers Amatsukaze and Murasame intercepted and stopped her, and ordered her to Bawean Island. The Japanese forced her to take Allied prisoners of war to Japanese PoW camps. On March 4 she embarked 59 members of the crew of USS Perch from the Japanese destroyer Ushio. Amatsukaze escorted Op Ten Noort to Banjarmasin in Kalimantan. There she embarked 970 PoWs, about 800 of whom were survivors from HMS Exeter. She next went to Makassar in Sulawesi on March 5. For the next eight months, Op Ten Noort provided hospital facilities for PoW camps in the area.

== Tenno Maru ==
On June 5, 1942 the ship was renamed Tenno Maru, which means "Emperor Circle". The Japanese Government contracted Kawasaki Kisen Kaisha to manage her. However, she flew the Dutch ensign until October 16, 1942, when she changed to the Japanese ensign. It is alleged that after changing ensigns, Tenno Maru carried a cargo of mines, in contravention of the Hague Conventions.

On December 5, 1942, Tenno Maru arrived in Yokohama, where her remaining Dutch and Javanese crew and medical staff were discharged. The Dutch were sent to a PoW camp at Mijoshi, 75 kilometres (47 miles) northwest of Yokohama. The Javanese were sent to a different camp. On December 20 the ship was commissioned as an Imperial Japanese Navy hospital ship, and assigned to the Yokosuka Naval District.

In January 1943 Mitsubishi Heavy Industries in Yokohama started to convert Tenno Maru with new hospital facilities and nurses' accommodation. Her smokestack and derricks were altered. The conversion was completed on March 21.

From April 25, 1943 onwards Tenno Maru treated and evacuated Japanese wounded, mostly from Rabaul and Truk to Yokosuka and Sasebo. From November 23 to December 1, 1943 she was dry docked in Yokohama. On February 18, during Operation Hailstone, some Grumman dive bomber pilots from the aircraft carrier USS Bunker Hill reported anti-aircraft fire from Tenno Maru. From February 1944 her ports of call included Saipan. On May 2 she left Guam for the last time, and on May 25 she made what may have been her last visit to Truk.

On July 12, 1944, aircraft from US Task Force 58 strafed and damaged Tenno Maru as she arrived in Palau. From July to September 1944 the ship called at Takao, Singapore, Saigon, and Manila, before returning to Yokosuka.

== Hikawa Maru No. 2 ==
In October 1944, Allied codebreakers lost track of Tenno Maru, and believed she had struck a mine near Makassar. In fact, a dummy second smokestack was added aft of her real one to disguise her, and on October 25, 1944 she was renamed Hikawa Maru No. 2. She continued to carry the internationally recognised hospital ship livery, painted all white, with a broad, green waistband interrupted by large red crosses.

On November 3, 1944, Hikawa Maru No. 2 rescued 26 survivors from Chinzei and Arabia Maru. On November 5 she received wounded from the Battle of Leyte Gulf, including 55 wounded from Yamato. For the rest of November she operated between Borneo, Manila and Takao. From November 23 to December 3 she was in Sasebo for repairs, and on December 27 she returned for emergency repairs.

From December 1944 until July 1945 she made several voyages to Singapore, and from March 1945 she made voyages to Batavia as well as Singapore. In this period sha also visited Fuzhou, Malacca, Batavia, Makassar, Ambon and Serasan Island. From May 2 to 14 she was dry docked at Maizuru Naval District. From July 9 to 11, she was in Saigon.

On July 24, 1945 Hikawa Maru No. 2 arrived back in Maizuru. On August 15, 1945 Japan surrendered. Two days later she was ordered to Wakasa Bay, where she was scuttled in water 400 feet (120 m) deep by two 150-kilogram (330 lb) explosive charges: one near her starboard bow, and the other aft of her dummy funnel.

It is not clear why the ship was scuttled. The Hague Conventions forbid the seizure of hospital ships, so it could have been an attempt to conceal the crime. There are claims that she was carrying looted gold, platinum, diamonds and other gems when she was scuttled. However, these claims have yet to be substantiated.

== Aftermath ==
The Netherlands did not know the ship had been renamed from Tenno Maru to Hikawa Maru No.2. However, in 1952, fishermen operating in Wakasa Bay reported an unknown wreck fouling their nets. A local prefecture contracted a professional diver from Kyoto to investigate. He found and photographed the wreck, enabling it to be identified.

In 1953 the Dutch Government filed a claim for 700 million yen compensation against the Japanese Government. Later the claim was reduced to 200 million yen. After protracted negotiations, Japan settled the claim in 1978 for 100 million yen.

In 2017 Op Ten Noort's wreck was rediscovered, and the Japanese broadcasting company NHK made a documentary about her.

== Bibliography ==
- Hardy, AC (1954) [1948]. Modern Marine Engineering. Vol. I (revised ed.). London: Caxton Publishing.
- Lloyd's Register of British and Foreign Shipping. Vol. II – Steamers and Motorships. London: Lloyd's Register of Shipping. 1928 – via Internet Archive.
- Lloyd's Register of Shipping (PDF). Vol. II – Steamers and Motorships of 300 Tons Gross and Over. London: Lloyd's Register of Shipping. 1934 – via Southampton City Council.
