= USS Barton (DD-599) =

Benson-class destroyer

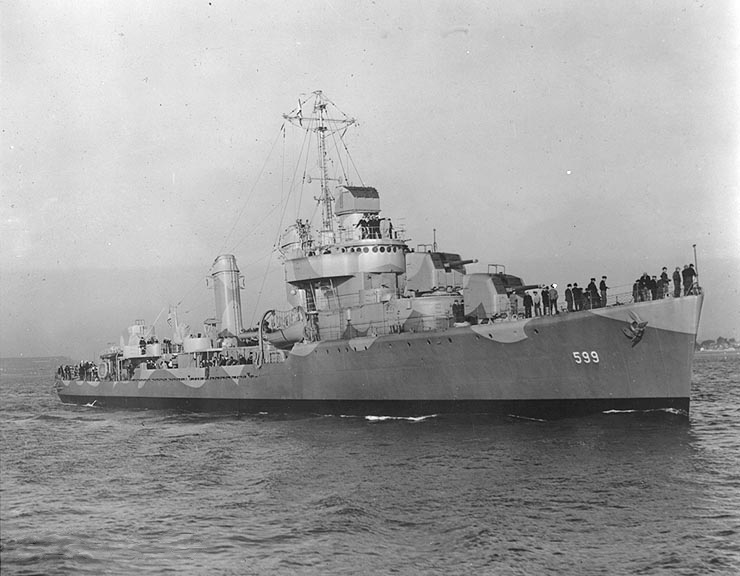
- Barton in Boston Harbor, Massachusetts on 29 May 1942

History

United States
- Name: USS Barton
- Namesake: John Kennedy Barton
- Builder: Fore River Shipyard
- Laid down: 20 May 1941
- Launched: 31 January 1942
- Commissioned: 29 May 1942
- Identification: DD-599
- Fate: Sunk by Japanese destroyer Amatsukaze, Battle of Guadalcanal, 13 November 1942

General characteristics
- Class & type: Benson-class destroyer
- Displacement: 1,620 tons
- Length: 347 ft 9 in (105.99 m)
- Beam: 36 ft 1 in (11.00 m)
- Draft: 17 ft 4 in (5.28 m)
- Speed: 36 knots (67 km/h; 41 mph)
- Complement: 276
- Armament: 4 × 5 in (130 mm)/38 guns; 4 × 1.1-inch/75 AA guns; 7 × 20mm AA guns; 5 × 21 in (533 mm) torpedo tubes

USS Barton (DD-599) was a Benson-class destroyer in the United States Navy during World War II. She was the first ship named for Rear Admiral John Kennedy Barton.

== Construction and commissioning ==
Barton was launched on 31 January 1942 by Bethlehem Steel Corporation at Quincy, Massachusetts, sponsored by Miss Barbara Dean Barton, granddaughter of Rear Admiral John Kennedy Barton, and commissioned on 29 May 1942, Lieutenant Commander Douglas Harold Fox in command.

== Service history ==
Barton departed the East Coast 23 August 1942 and steamed to the Pacific, arriving at Tongatapu, Tonga Islands, on 14 September 1942. During October, she participated in the Buin-Faisi-Tonolai raid (5 October) and the Battle of Santa Cruz (26 October), where she claimed shooting down seven Japanese planes. On 29 October, she successfully rescued 17 survivors of two downed air transports near Fabre Island.

Arriving off Guadalcanal on 12 November 1942, having safely escorted a supply convoy to the island, Barton was ordered to join up with Rear Admiral Daniel J. Callaghan's force of five cruisers and seven other destroyers to repel a force of Japanese warships reported by reconnaissance aircraft to be heading along the body of water known as the "Slot" towards Guadalcanal. Assuming her position in the 11th spot of the US force just before sundown, Barton's crew settled into their battle stations to wait out the Japanese, expected to arrive around midnight.

As darkness overspread the body of water known as Ironbottom Sound, several tropical rain storms and squalls began to cross the area, limiting visibility for both the Americans and the Japanese, as they steamed towards each other, but several American ships were equipped with long-range radar systems, which began to detect the approaching Japanese ships around 00:30 (12:30 am). Consisting of two battleships, one cruiser, and 11 destroyers, the Japanese fleet rounded the northwestern coast of Savo Island and entered Ironbottom Sound around 01:10 (1:10 am) and shaped their course for Henderson Field, the American airbase they were sent to destroy. Steaming through a heavy rain squall, the Japanese ships were totally unaware of the presence of the American force directly ahead of them, and the heavy rain prevented the US fleet from sighting the Japanese ships for over an hour after the first radar contact.

At roughly 01:30, both sides finally made visual contact with each other as the first Japanese ships emerged from the squall line only 3,000 yards (2,700 m) away from the entire US formation. Despite the Americans having steamed directly into the middle of the Japanese force, neither side opened fire for almost 10 minutes, as they passed by each other, with the Japanese ships enveloping the American battle column as they emerged from the darkness in three separate groups. In the second position of the rear, destroyer USS Barton began to train her deck guns and torpedo tubes on several Japanese ships in her immediate area and awaited the order to open fire from the flagship. At 01:48, the order to open fire was precluded when Akatsuki lit her searchlights onto the cruiser Atlanta, causing both sides to immediately open fire on each other and starting the First Naval Battle of Guadalcanal.

Now fully enveloped by Japanese battle lines, Barton and Monssen steaming astern and broke to the northwest into the main group of Japanese ships, while firing at point-blank range on nearby Japanese destroyers and making violent maneuvers to avoid collisions with both friendly and enemy ships in the melee. Barton had just fired a full spread of torpedoes at the battleship Hiei when the light cruiser USS Helena appeared suddenly out of the darkness and cut directly across the bow of Barton. Making an emergency stop to avoid colliding with Helena, Barton found herself at a dead stop, as her engineering crew tried to get her engines back into gear to get her moving again. Before she could get underway, though, two Type 93 torpedoes fired by Amatsukaze slammed into Barton's midsection, one in her boiler room and one in her engine room. The massive explosions broke the Barton in two, and both sections sank only minutes after the first torpedo struck, carrying with her 164 men - 13 officers and 151 of her crew; 42 survivors were rescued by USS Portland and 26 by Higgins boats from Guadalcanal.

== Awards ==
In her short six months of active service to the US Navy, Barton received four battle stars for her service in World War II.

== Rediscovery ==
The forward section of the wreck of Barton was discovered in 1992 by Robert Ballard, with only the hull section and superstructure ahead of the boiler room found intact. To date, the stern section of Barton has not been located.
