= Aya Suzaki =

Japanese voice actress (born 1986)

- 洲崎 綾
- Born: December 25, 1986 (age 39); Kanazawa, Ishikawa Prefecture, Japan
- Education: Tokyo Gakugei University
- Occupations: Voice actress; narrator
- Years active: 2010–present
- Agent: I'm Enterprise
- Notable work: Tamako Market as Tamako Kitashirakawa; Kill la Kill as Mako Mankanshoku; Assassination Classroom as Kaede Kayano; Knights of Sidonia as Shizuka Hoshijiro, Tsumugi Shiraui; The IDOLM@STER Cinderella Girls (including Theater) as Minami Nitta; Kantai Collection as Akatsuki class, Mogami, Hōshō, Aoba; Battle Girl High School as Miki Hoshitsuki; Aikatsu! as Mikuru Natsuki; Hyrule Warriors as Proxi; Genshin Impact as Sayu; Soulcalibur VI as Chai Xianghua
- Spouse: Takashi Ifukube (m. 2019)

Aya Suzaki (洲崎 綾, Suzaki Aya; born December 25, 1986) is a Japanese voice actress and narrator affiliated with I'm Enterprise. She is widely known for her work, such as Tamako Kitashirakawa in Tamako Market.

== Biography ==
Suzaki is good at singing, and lists soft tennis and scuba diving as her favorite sport. Her hobbies are playing the trumpet and flower arrangement. She is also a licensed teacher.

She performed the opening and ending themes to the anime Tamako Market under her character name Tamako Kitashirakawa.

She received one of the Best Female Newcomers at the 9th Seiyu Awards in March 2015.

In December 2019, Suzaki married anime writer Takashi Ifukube.

== Filmography ==
=== Television animation ===
2010

- Bakuman.: Misayo Amane (Ep. 22)

2011

- Manyū Hiken-chō: Grass C

2012

- My Little Monster: Female Student B (Ep. 6)
- To Love Ru: Darkness: Female Student (Ep. 12), Schoolgirl B (Ep. 5)

2013

- A Certain Scientific Railgun S: Rikō Takitsubo
- Bakuman. 3: Keiko Naka (Ep. 23)
- Da Capo III: Nakayama
- Day Break Illusion: Cerebrum (girl, Eps. 5–8)
- Haganai NEXT: Gal (Ep. 11), Galge (Ep. 6)
- Jewelpet Happiness: Student
- Kill la Kill: Mako Mankanshoku
- Kiniro Mosaic: Classmate Girl B (Ep. 5)
- Kyōsōgiga: Girl (Ep. 1), Shrine Girl
- Kotoura-san: Store Clerk (Ep. 8)
- Little Busters!: Yumi (Ep. 24)
- Oreimo 2: Alpha (Ep. 1), Ran-chin (Ep. 10)
- Oreshura: Rin Kawachi (Ep. 13), Waitress (Ep. 8)
- Phi Brain: Kami no Puzzle: Nono (Ep. 10)
- Ro-Kyu-Bu! SS: Hiiragi Takenaka
- Sasami-san@Ganbaranai: Classmate F (Ep. 10)
- Senki Zesshō Symphogear G: Announcer (Eps. 4, 5)
- Stella Women's Academy, High School Division Class C3: Kazuha (Eps. 10–13)
- Tamako Market: Tamako Kitashirakawa
- The "Hentai" Prince and the Stony Cat.: Moriya
- Yuyushiki: Female Student C (Ep. 4)

2014

- Aikatsu!: Mikuru Natsuki
- Brynhildr in the Darkness: Kana Tachibana
- Daimidaler the Sound Robot: Likantz Seaberry, Announcer (Ep. 1)
- Girl Friend BETA: Kurumi Eto
- Invaders of the Rokujyōma!?: Shizuka Kasagi
- Knights of Sidonia: Shizuka Hoshijiro
- Magi: The Kingdom of Magic: Marga
- Robot Girls Z: Poses O2
- Trinity Seven: Selina Sherlock

2015

- Assassination Classroom: Kaede Kayano
- Classroom Crisis: Tsubasa Hanaoka
- Kantai Collection: Akatsuki class, Mogami, Hōshō, Aoba
- Knights of Sidonia: Battle for Planet Nine: Shizuka Hoshijiro, Tsumugi Shiraui
- RIN-NE: Rika, Girl E (Ep. 11)
- Suzakinishi the Animation: Aya Suzaki
- Go! Princess PreCure: Karin Akehoshi
- The IDOLM@STER Cinderella Girls: Minami Nitta
- Wish Upon the Pleiades: Aoi's Friend

2016

- Ajin: Demi-Human: Eriko Nagai
- Assassination Classroom Second Season: Kaede Kayano
- Phantasy Star Online 2: The Animation: Washinomiya Kohri (ep 5)
- D-Gray-man Hallow: Emilia Galmar

2017

- ACCA: 13-Territory Inspection Dept.: Ada
- The Idolmaster Cinderella Girls Theater (4 seasons; April 2017-June 2019): Minami Nitta
- Battle Girl High School: Miki Hoshitsuki
- Juni Taisen: Kiyoko Inō (Ep. 1)
- Mahōjin Guru Guru: Churu (Ep. 5)

2018

- BanG Dream! Girls Band Party! Pico: Marina Tsukishima
- Happy Sugar Life: Shōko Hida
- Release the Spyce: Mei Yachiyo
- Himote House: Tae Hongou
- A Certain Magical Index III: Rikō Takitsubo

2019

- BanG Dream! 2nd Season: Marina Tsukishima
- Magical Girl Spec-Ops Asuka: Asuka Otori
- Miru Tights: Homi Moegi
- Kandagawa Jet Girls: Kuromaru Manpuku

2020

- BanG Dream! Girls Band Party! Pico: Ohmori: Marina Tsukishima
- Journal of the Mysterious Creatures: Lily
- Super HxEros: Miharichuu
- Rail Romanesque: Kiko

2021

- Back Arrow: Atlee Ariel
- Ancient Girl's Frame: Luna Mariano Perez Lupiano
- BanG Dream! Girls Band Party! Pico Fever!: Marina Tsukishima

2022

- Cue!: Rio Isuzu
- Girls' Frontline: Simonov
- RWBY: Ice Queendom: Nora Valkyrie
- Lucifer and the Biscuit Hammer: Yayoi Hakudō
- Kantai Collection: Let's Meet at Sea: Akatsuki class, Mogami, Hōshō, Aoba
- Extreme Hearts: Emi Hōjō

2023

- Farming Life in Another World: Tia
- The Demon Sword Master of Excalibur Academy: Regina
- Kawagoe Boys Sing: Rika Iijima

2025

- Hell Teacher: Jigoku Sensei Nube: Kyoko Inaba

2026

- A Certain Dark Item: Rikou Takitsubou

=== Movies ===
2014

- Aikatsu! The Movie: Mikuru Natsuki
- Tamako Love Story: Tamako Kitashirakawa

2015

- Ajin Part 1: Shōdō: Eriko Nagai
- Knights of Sidonia: Shizuka Hoshijiro
- Harmony: Cian Reikado

2017

- Blame!: Tae
- Godzilla: Planet of the Monsters: young Haruo

2021

- Knights of Sidonia: Love Woven in the Stars: Shizuka Hoshijiro

=== Video games ===
2011

- THE IDOLM@STER Cinderella Girls: Minami Nitta

2013

- Akiba's Trip: Undead & Undressed: Nana
- Kantai Collection: Hōshō, Aoba, Mogami, Akatsuki, Hibiki/Верный, Ikazuchi, Inazuma

2014

- Guilty Gear Xrd: Elphelt Valentine
- Hyrule Warriors: Proxi

2015

- Battle Girl High School: Miki Hoshitsuki
- Flowers - Le volume sur Ete-: Chidori Takasaki
- Grand Sphere: Comette the Automaton
- Hyper Galaxy Fleet: Shimamoto Izumi
- Under Night In-Birth Exe:Late[st]: Mika
- Valkyrie Drive -Bhikkhuni-: Rinka Kagurazaka

2016

- Flowers - Le volume sur Automne-: Chidori Takasaki
- Granblue Fantasy: Cucouroux
- Phantasy Star Online 2: Washinomiya Kohri
- Girls' Frontline: Simonov, M9

2017

- BanG Dream! Girls Band Party!: Marina Tsukishima
- Fire Emblem Heroes: Maria, Ninian
- Magia Record: Puella Magi Madoka Magica Side Story: Manaka Kurumi
- Flowers - Le volume sur Hiver-: Chidori Takasaki

2018

- Soulcalibur VI: Chai Xianghua
- Grand Chase: Dimensional Chaser: Sage
- Master of Eternity: Leahs and Maiyo
- Azur Lane: Ryuujou
- Higurashi When They Cry Hō: Une

2020

- Kandagawa Jet Girls: Kuromaru Manpuku
- Moe! Ninja Girls RPG: Akari Hanao
- Ash Arms: Panzer V Panther, SU-26

2021

- Rune Factory 5: Scarlett
- Genshin Impact: Sayu
- Final Fantasy XIV: Endwalker: Livingway

2022

- Xenoblade Chronicles 3: Manana

2023

- Goddess of Victory: Nikke: Jackal
- Guilty Gear Strive: Elphelt Valentine

2024

- Reverse Collapse: Code Name Bakery: Jefuty

=== Drama CD ===
- Imōto ga ō Sugite Nemurenai: Isaribi

2015

- Benichidori no Hanakotoba: Takasaki Chidori

=== Dubbing ===
- Exchange Student Zero: Happy Peach Flower
