= USS Atlanta (CL-51) =

Atlanta-class light cruiser

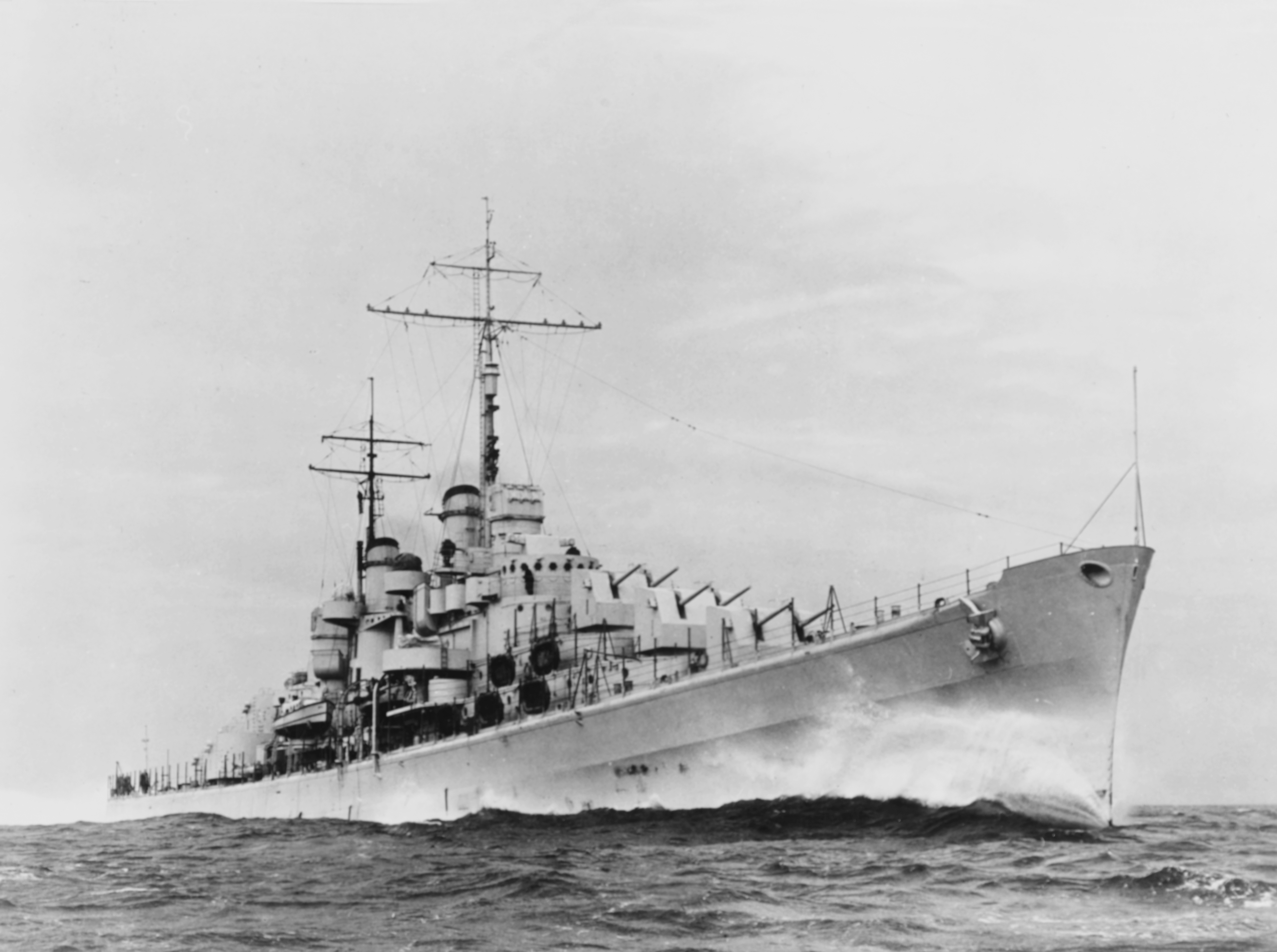
- USS Atlanta, circa November 1941

History

United States
- Name: Atlanta
- Namesake: City of Atlanta, Georgia
- Builder: Federal Shipbuilding and Drydock Company, Kearny, New Jersey
- Laid down: 22 April 1940
- Launched: 6 September 1941
- Sponsored by: Margaret Mitchell
- Commissioned: 24 December 1941
- Stricken: 13 November 1942
- Identification: Hull symbol:CL-51
- Honors and awards: 5 × battle stars; Presidential Unit Citation
- Fate: Scuttled after severe damage in Naval Battle of Guadalcanal by Japanese torpedo and friendly fire from USS San Francisco, 13 November 1942
- Notes: Approximate location of sinking: 9°23′S 159°58′E

General characteristics (as built)
- Class & type: Atlanta-class light cruiser
- Displacement: 6,718 long tons (6,826 t) (standard); 8,340 long tons (8,474 t) (max)
- Length: 541 ft 6 in (165.05 m) oa
- Beam: 53 ft (16 m)
- Draft: 20 ft 6 in (6.25 m) (mean); 26 ft 6 in (8.08 m) (max)
- Installed power: 4 × Steam boilers; 75,000 shp (56,000 kW)
- Propulsion: 2 × geared turbines; 2 × screws
- Speed: 32.5 kn (37.4 mph; 60.2 km/h)
- Complement: 673 officers and enlisted
- Sensors & processing systems: 2 × FD fire control radar in Mk 37 director; 1 × SC Air search radar (in 1942)
- Armament: 16 × 5 in (127 mm)/38 caliber Mark 12 guns (8×2); 16 × 1.1 in (28 mm)/75 anti-aircraft guns (4 × 4); 8 × single 20 mm (0.79 in) Oerlikon anti-aircraft cannons; 8 × 21 in (533 mm) torpedo tubes
- Armor: Belt: 1.1–3 3/4 in (28–95 mm); Deck: 1 1/4 in (32 mm); Turrets: 1 1/4 in (32 mm); Conning tower: 2 1/2 in (64 mm)

USS Atlanta (CL-51) of the United States Navy was the lead ship of the Atlanta class of eight light cruisers. She was the third Navy ship named after the city of Atlanta, Georgia. Designed to provide anti-aircraft protection for US naval task groups, Atlanta served in this capacity in the naval battles Midway and the Eastern Solomons. Atlanta was heavily damaged by Japanese and friendly gunfire in a night surface action on 13 November 1942 during the Naval Battle of Guadalcanal. The cruiser was sunk on her captain's orders in the afternoon of the same day.

Atlanta, in some works, is designated CLAA-51 because of her primary armament as an anti-aircraft cruiser. Hence, all of the Atlanta-class ships are sometimes designated as CLAA. However, her entire battery of 5-inch (127 mm) guns were dual-purpose (DP) guns, and were capable of being used against both air and surface targets, able to fire anti-aircraft, high-explosive and armor-piercing shells.

The Atlanta-class ships were lightly armored, making them poor surface combatants compared to a typical light cruiser. In terms of armament, the Atlanta-class was closer to a destroyer, being armed with 5-inch guns, than a light cruiser, which were generally equipped with 6-inch guns; but at well over 500 feet (152 m) in length, and combined with their large battery of sixteen 5-inch (127 mm) guns, reduced to twelve in number for later ships of the class, they were designated as light cruisers. The unusual features of the Atlanta-class is a result of the class originally being intended to be a destroyer leader. A destroyer leader is larger than its destroyer counterparts to accommodate command staff and resources as well as other general utilities to support the destroyers that they would be paired with.

In-line with this intended role the ship was given a complement of torpedoes and relatively thin armor compared to other contemporary light cruisers. Later, the dimensions and tonnage of the ship resulted in a change in designation of the Atlanta-class from a destroyer leader to a light cruiser. Despite this change in designation, the Atlanta-class of ships maintained their destroyer leader features, including their destroyer-caliber guns, albeit while mounting significantly more 5 in guns than most contemporary destroyers.

== Construction and commissioning ==
The first of the new class of ships was laid down on 22 April 1940 at Kearny, New Jersey, by the Federal Shipbuilding and Drydock Co.. She was launched on 6 September 1941, sponsored by Margaret Mitchell, author of Gone with the Wind, and commissioned at the New York Navy Yard on 24 December 1941, with Captain Samuel P. Jenkins in command.

=== Armament ===
Atlanta was fitted with eight twin 5-inch gun mounts, placed in a unique configuration. She had three forward mounts and three aft mounts, mounted inline and increasing in height toward the midships, giving her a symmetrical appearance, with a "gap" in the middle superstructure. The aft battery also had one "wing-mounted" mount on each side, for a total of 16 five-inch guns.

The firing arcs of the forward and aft batteries intersected at a very limited angle, giving her an arc of 60° in which she could fire all of her guns broadside, excluding the wing mounts. Because Atlanta was able to bring all her guns to bear only within that narrow arc, her ability to engage surface targets was limited. Her firing arcs were ideally suited to bringing her guns to bear on an aircraft, with a minimum of six guns available from any angle.

== Service history ==
After fitting out, Atlanta conducted shakedown training until 13 March 1942, first in Chesapeake Bay and then in Maine's Casco Bay, after which she returned to the New York Navy Yard for post-shakedown repairs and alterations. Adjudged to be "ready for distant service" on 31 March, the new cruiser departed New York for the Panama Canal Zone on 5 April. She reached Cristobal on 8 April.

After transiting the isthmian waterway, Atlanta cleared Balboa on 12 April with orders to reconnoiter Clipperton Island, a tiny barren, uninhabited atoll about 670 mi (1,080 km) southwest of Acapulco, Mexico, in the course of her voyage to the Hawaiian Islands, for any signs of enemy activity. Finding none, she reached Pearl Harbor on 23 April.

=== Battle of Midway ===
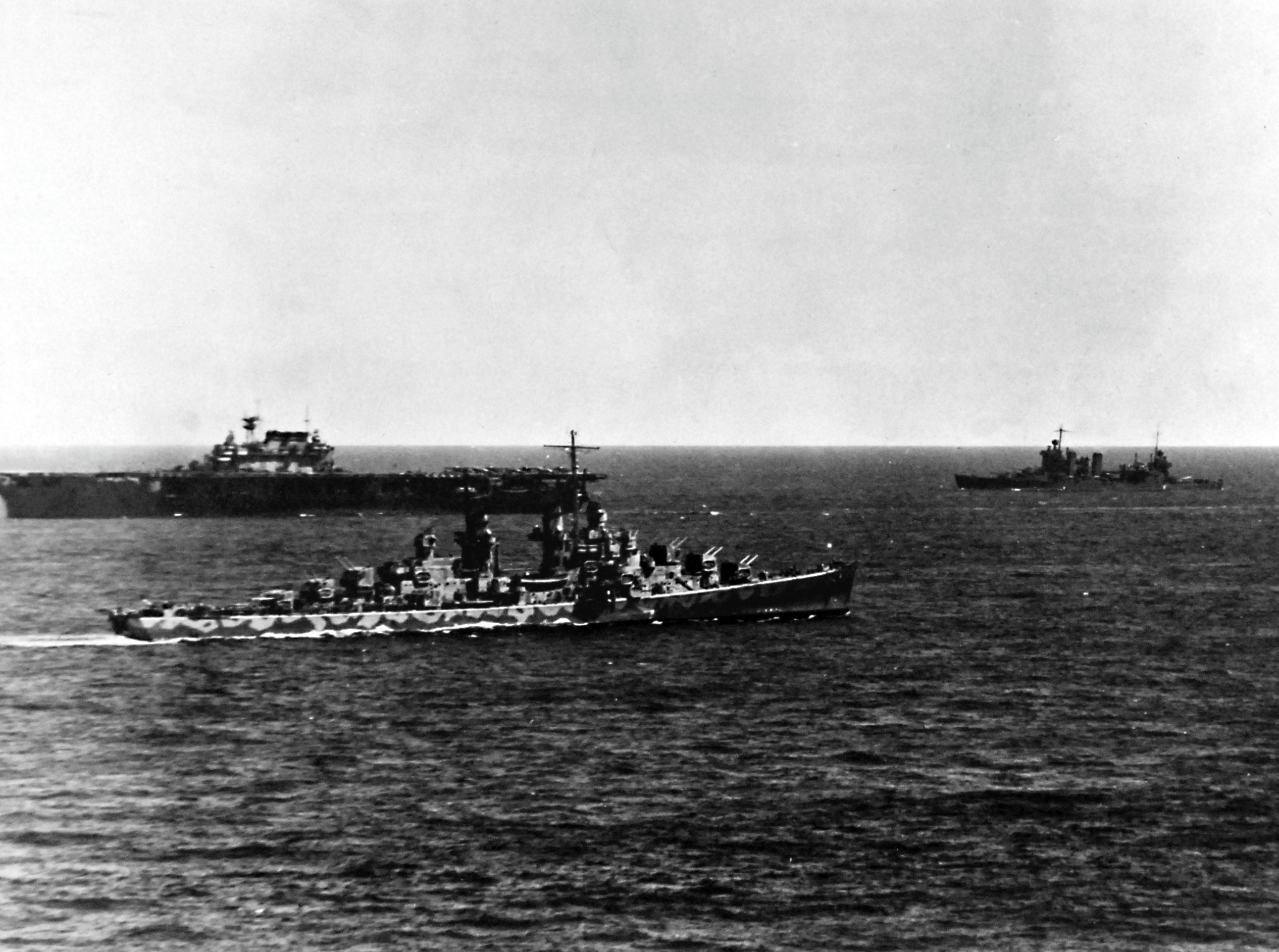
Atlanta with USS Hornet and USS New Orleans on 6 June 1942.

Punctuating her brief stay in Hawaiian waters with an antiaircraft practice off Oahu on 3 May, Atlanta, in company with McCall, sailed on 10 May as escort for Rainier and Kaskaskia, bound for Nouméa, New Caledonia. On 16 May, she joined Vice Admiral William F. Halsey's Task Force 16 (TF 16), formed around the aircraft carriers Enterprise and Hornet, as it steamed back to Pearl Harbor, having been summoned back to Hawaiian waters in response to an imminent Japanese thrust in the direction of Midway Atoll. TF 16 arrived at Pearl on 26 May.

Atlanta again sailed with TF 16 on the morning of 28 May. Over the days that followed, she screened the carriers as they operated northeast of Midway in anticipation of the enemy's arrival. At the report of Japanese ships to the southwest, on the morning of 4 June, Atlanta cleared for action as she screened Hornet. Squadrons from the American carriers sought out the Japanese, and during that day, planes from Yorktown and Enterprise inflicted mortal damage on four irreplaceable enemy aircraft carriers. Japanese planes twice hit TF 17, and it took the brunt of the enemy attacks. Over the days that followed the Battle of Midway, Atlanta remained in the screen of TF 16 until 11 June, when the task force received orders to return to Pearl Harbor.

Reaching her destination on 13 June, Atlanta, outside brief periods of antiaircraft practice on 21 and 25–26 June, remained in port, taking on stores and provisions and standing on 24-hour and then 48-hour alert into July 1942. Drydocked on 1–2 July so that her bottom could be scraped, cleaned and painted, the cruiser completed her availability on 6 July and then resumed a busy schedule of gunnery practice with drone targets, high-speed sleds, and in shore bombardment in the Hawaiian operating area.

On 15 July 1942, Atlanta, again in TF 16, sailed for Tongatapu. Anchoring at Nukuʻalofa, Tonga on 24 July, where she fueled Maury and then took on fuel from Mobilube, the light cruiser pushed on later the same day and overtook TF 16. On 29 July, as all preparations proceeded for the invasion of Guadalcanal, Atlanta was assigned to TF 61.

Screening the carriers as they launched air strikes to support the initial landings on 7–8 August, Atlanta remained there until the withdrawal of the carrier task forces on 9 August. For the next several days, she remained at sea, replenishing when necessary while the task force operated near the Solomons.

=== Battle of the Eastern Solomons ===
As the Americans consolidated their gains on Guadalcanal, the critical need for reinforcements prompted Japanese Admiral Isoroku Yamamoto to send the Combined Fleet south to cover a large troop convoy. American scout planes spotted the Japanese forces on the morning of 23 August. With the enemy reported to the northwest, Enterprise and Saratoga launched search and attack planes, but they failed to make contact because of deteriorating weather and the fact that the Japanese, knowing that they had been spotted, reversed course.

Throughout the day on 24 August, Atlanta received enemy contact reports and screened Enterprise as she launched a strike group to attack the Japanese carriers. The sighting of an enemy "snooper" at 1328 sent Atlanta's sailors to general quarters, where they remained for the next 5 1/2 hours. At 1530, the cruiser worked up to 20 knots (23 mph; 37 km/h) as TF 16 stood roughly north-northwestward "to close [the] reported enemy carrier group." At 1637, with unidentified planes approaching, Atlanta went to 25 knots (29 mph; 46 km/h). Enterprise then launched a strike group shortly thereafter, completing the evolution at 1706.

In the meantime, the incoming enemy bombers and fighter aircraft from Shōkaku and Zuikaku prompted the task force to increase speed to 27 knots (31 mph; 50 km/h). Shortly after Enterprise completed launching her own aircraft, the Japanese raid, estimated by Captain Jenkins to consist of at least 18 Aichi D3A1 "Val" dive bombers, came in from the north northwest at 1710. Over the next 11 minutes, Atlanta's 5 in (127 mm), 1.1 in (27.9 mm) and 20 mm batteries contributed to the barrage over Enterprise, as the light cruiser conformed to Enterprise's every move as she maneuvered violently to avoid the dive bombers.

Despite the heavy antiaircraft fire, Enterprise took one hit and suffered some shrapnel damage from an estimated five near hits. Captain Jenkins later reported that his ship may have shot down five of the attackers. Atlanta was not damaged in the engagement.

Reporting to TF 11 for duty the following day, Atlanta operated with that force, redesignated TF 61 on 30 August, over the next few days. When I-26 torpedoed Saratoga on 31 August, the light cruiser screened the stricken flagship as Minneapolis rigged a towline and began taking her out of danger. The force ultimately put into Tongatapu on 6 September, where Atlanta provisioned ship, fueled from New Orleans, and enjoyed a period of upkeep.

Underway on 13 September, the light cruiser escorted Lassen and Hammondsport on 15 September. After seeing her charges safely to their destination at Dumbea Bay, Nouméa, on 19 September, Atlanta fueled, took on stores and ammunition, and sailed on 21 September as part of Task Group 66.4 (TG 66.4). Becoming part of TF 17 on 23 September, the light cruiser was detached the following day to proceed in company with Washington, Walke and Benham to Tongatapu, which she reached on 26 September.

Underway with those same ships on 7 October, Atlanta briefly escorted Guadalcanal-bound transports from 11 to 14 October, before putting into Espiritu Santo for fuel on the afternoon of the 15th. Assigned then to Rear Admiral Willis A. Lee's TF 64, the ship sailed after dark that same day to resume operations covering the ongoing efforts to secure Guadalcanal. Returning briefly to Espiritu Santo for fuel, stores and provisions, the warship stood out from Segond Channel on the afternoon of 23 October.

Two days later, with a Japanese Army offensive having failed to eject the Americans from Guadalcanal, Admiral Yamamoto sent the Combined Fleet south in an attempt to annihilate the American naval forces doggedly supporting the marines. Atlanta operated in TF 64, along with Washington, San Francisco, Helena and two destroyers, as the opposing forces engaged in the Battle of the Santa Cruz Islands on 26 October. That day, Atlanta patrolled astern of the fueling group supporting the two American carrier task forces. On 27 October, when I-15 attacked TF 64, the force maneuvered at high speed to clear the area.

On the morning of 28 October, Atlanta brought on board Rear Admiral Norman Scott from San Francisco, and became the flagship of the newly designated TG 64.2. After fueling from Washington, Atlanta, screened by four destroyers, headed northwest to shell Japanese positions on Guadalcanal. Reaching the waters off Lunga Point on the morning of 30 October, Atlanta embarked Marine liaison officers at 0550, and then steamed west, commencing her bombardment of Point Cruz at 0629 while the destroyers formed a column astern. Provoking no return fire, TG 64.2 accomplished its mission and returned to Lunga Point, where Atlanta disembarked the liaison officers. She then proceeded, in company with her screen, to Espiritu Santo, where she arrived on the afternoon of 31 October.

=== Naval Battle of Guadalcanal ===
==== Convoy escort ====
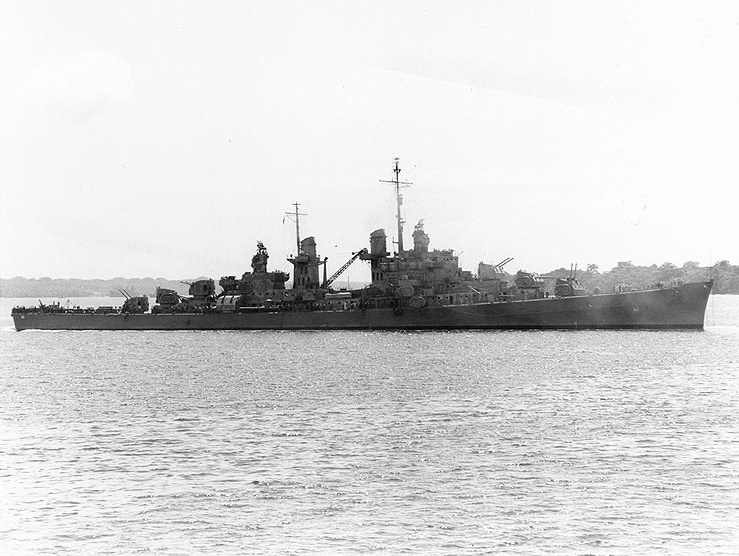
Atlanta on 25 October 1942.

Atlanta served as Admiral Scott's flagship as the light cruiser, accompanied by four destroyers, escorted Zeilin, Libra and Betelgeuse to Guadalcanal. The cruiser and her consorts continued to screen those ships, designated TG 62.4, as they lay off Lunga Point on 12 November unloading supplies and disembarking troops.

At 0905, the task group received a report that nine bombers and 12 fighters were approaching from the northwest, and would reach their vicinity at about 0930. At about 0920, Atlanta led the three auxiliaries to the north in column, with the destroyers spaced in a circle around them. 15 minutes later, nine "Vals" from Hiyō emerged from the clouds over Henderson Field, the American airstrip on Guadalcanal. The American ships opened fire soon after, putting up a barrage that downed "several" planes. None of the primary targets of the attack, Zeilin, Libra and Betelgeuse, suffered more than minor damage from several close calls, though Zeilin sustained some flooding. The three auxiliaries returned to the waters off Lunga Point as soon as the attack ended and resumed working cargo and disembarking troops.

A little over an hour later, at 1050, Atlanta received word of another incoming Japanese air raid. 15 minutes later, Atlanta led the three auxiliaries north with the destroyers in a circle around the disposition. The "bogeys", 27 Mitsubishi G4M "Bettys" from Rabaul, closed, sighted bearing west by north, approaching from over Cape Esperance in a very loose "V" formation. Although the destroyers opened fire, the planes proved to be out of range and the ships checked fire. The "Bettys" ignored the ships, and continued on to bomb Henderson Field. Upon the disappearance of the planes, TG 62.4 resumed unloading off Lunga Point.

On 12 November, Atlanta was still off Lunga Point, screening the unloading, as part of TF 67 under Rear Admiral Daniel J. Callaghan in San Francisco. At about 1310, Atlanta received a warning that 25 enemy planes were headed for Guadalcanal, slated to arrive within 50 minutes. The light cruiser went to general quarters at 1318 and received the signal "prepare to repel air attack...."

Within six minutes, Atlanta and the other combatants of the support group formed a screen around the transport group (TG 67.1), and the two groups steamed north together at 15 knots (17 mph; 28 km/h). At about 1410, the Americans sighted the incoming raid, consisting of what appeared to be 25 twin-engined bombers ("Bettys") which broke up into two groups after clearing Florida Island, and came in at altitudes that ranged from 25 to 50 ft (8 to 15 m).

Juneau opened fire at 1412. Atlanta did so a minute later, training her guns at planes headed for the gap in the screen between San Francisco and Buchanan. Atlanta claimed to have shot down two "Bettys", just after they dropped their torpedoes, at about 1415, only three minutes before the attack ended. Once the last Japanese plane had been splashed, the work of unloading the transports and cargo ships resumed. One "Betty", crippled by antiaircraft fire, crashed into the after superstructure of San Francisco, inflicting the only damage on the force.

==== Night attack ====
The abrupt end of the air attack gave Atlanta and her colleagues only a brief respite, for trouble approached from yet another quarter. A Japanese surface force, made up of two battleships, one cruiser and six destroyers, was detected steaming south toward Guadalcanal to shell Henderson Field. Admiral Callaghan's support group was to "cover [the retiring transports and cargo vessels] against enemy attack." TG 67.4 departed Lunga Point about 1800 and steamed eastward through Sealark Channel, covering the withdrawal of TG 67.1. An hour before midnight, Callaghan's ships reversed course and headed westward.

Helena's radar picked up the first contact at a range of 26,000 yd (13 nmi). As the range closed, Atlanta's surface search radar, followed by her gunnery radars, picked up a contact on the enemy ships.

Admiral Callaghan's order for a course change caused problems almost at once, as Atlanta had to turn to port (left) immediately to avoid a collision with one of the four destroyers in the van, the latter having apparently executed a "ships left" rather than "column left" movement. As Atlanta began moving to resume her station ahead of San Francisco, the Japanese destroyer Akatsuki illuminated the light cruiser. Atlanta shifted her main battery to fire at the enemy destroyer, opening fire at a range of about 1,600 yd (1,463 m) and, along with other US ships that concentrated on Akatsuki's searchlights, overwhelmed the destroyer.

As two other Japanese destroyers crossed her line, Atlanta engaged both with her forward 5-inch (127 mm) mounts, while her aft mounts continued to blast away at the illuminated ship. An additional, unidentified assailant also opened up on the light cruiser from the northeast. At about that time, at least one torpedo plowed into Atlanta's forward engine room from the port side, fired almost certainly by either Inazuma or Ikazuchi, Akatsuki's destroyer consorts.

Atlanta lost all but auxiliary diesel power, suffered the interruption of her gunfire, and had to shift steering control to the steering engine room aft. Meanwhile, Akatsuki drifted out of the action and soon sank with heavy loss of life. Michiharu Shinya, Akatsuki's Chief Torpedo Officer, one of her few survivors, was rescued the next day by US forces and spent the rest of the war in a New Zealand prisoner of war camp. He later stated unequivocally that Akatsuki had not been able to fire any torpedoes that night before being overwhelmed by gunfire.

Soon after being torpedoed, Atlanta was then hit by an estimated nineteen 8-inch (203 mm) shells when San Francisco, "in the urgency of battle, darkness, and confused intermingling of friend or foe", fired into her. Though almost all of the shells passed through the thin skin of the ship without detonating, scattering green dye, fragments from their impact killed many men, including Admiral Scott and members of his staff. Atlanta prepared to return fire on her new assailant, but San Francisco's own gun flashes disclosed a distinctly "non-Japanese hull profile" that resulted in a suspension of those efforts. San Francisco's shells, which passed high through Atlanta's superstructure, may have been intended for a Japanese target further beyond her from San Francisco's perspective.

After the 8-inch (203 mm) fire ceased, Atlanta's Captain Jenkins took stock of the situation, and, having only a minor foot wound, made his way aft to Battle II. His ship was badly battered, largely powerless, down by the head and listing slightly to port, and a third of his crew was dead or missing. As the battle continued, the light cruiser's men began clearing debris, jettisoning topside weight to correct the list, reducing the volume of sea water in the ship, and succoring the many wounded.

==== Sinking ====
Daylight revealed the presence nearby of three burning American destroyers, the disabled Portland, and the abandoned hulk of Yūdachi, which Portland dispatched with three salvoes. Atlanta, drifting toward the enemy-held shore east of Cape Esperance, dropped her starboard anchor, and her captain sent a message to Portland explaining the light cruiser's condition. Boats from Guadalcanal came out to take her most critically wounded. By mid-morning, all of those had been taken off the ship.

Bobolink arrived at 09:30 on 13 November, took Atlanta under tow, made harder by the cruiser's still lowered anchor, and headed toward Lunga Point. During the voyage, a "Betty" bomber neared them, and one of the two surviving 5 in (127 mm) mounts—which was powered by a diesel generator—fired and drove it off. The other manually-rotated mount could not be trained on the target in time.

Atlanta reached Kukum about 14:00, at which point Captain Jenkins conferred with his remaining officers. As Jenkins, who was awarded a Navy Cross for his heroism during the battle, later wrote, "It was by now apparent that efforts to save the ship were useless, and that the water was gaining steadily." Even had sufficient salvage facilities been available, he allowed, the severe damage she had taken would have made it difficult to save the ship. Authorized by Commander, South Pacific Forces, to act at his own discretion regarding the destruction of the ship, Jenkins ordered that Atlanta be abandoned and sunk with a demolition charge.

All remaining men except the captain and a demolition party boarded Higgins boats sent out from Guadalcanal for the purpose. After the charge had been set and exploded, the last men left the battered ship. At 20:15 on 13 November 1942, Atlanta sank 3 nautical miles (5.6 km; 3.5 mi) west of Lunga Point in about 400 ft (120 m) of water. Her name was struck from the Naval Vessel Register on 13 January 1943. One hundred seventy of her men were killed and 103 were wounded.

==== Exploration of the wreck ====
The wreck of USS Atlanta was discovered in 1992 by an expedition led by Dr. Robert Ballard using a remotely operated underwater vehicle, (ROV). Dr. Ballard was famous for leading the expeditions that discovered RMS Titanic and the German battleship Bismarck. Unfortunately, strong ocean currents and poor visibility prevented the expedition from thoroughly exploring Atlanta. Many other World War II wrecks discovered by Dr. Ballard in Iron Bottom Sound are beyond the current technical limit for scuba and are only accessible by ROVs or submersibles. Dr Ballard gives an account of this in his book The Lost Ships of Guadalcanal.

In 1994, two Australian technical divers Rob Cason and Kevin Denlay traveled to Solomon Islands with the intention of being the first scuba divers to dive Atlanta. This was unsuccessful because of the lack of a suitable surface support vessel and strong surface currents. This was the first mixed gas scuba diving expedition to Guadalcanal. They managed to dive one of the two other deepest diveable wrecks, the Japanese transport Azumasan Maru, which is almost 90 m (295 ft) deep at the stern.

In 1995, Denlay returned with American Terrance Tysall - with the specific intention of diving USS Atlanta - and one of their 'work-up dives' was on the Sasako Maru, one of the other deepest diveable wrecks at the time, which is over 90 m (295 ft) in the collapsed debris field of the bridge. They then went on to make the first successful scuba dive on USS Atlanta, which was at the time the deepest wreck dive by free swimming divers in the southern hemisphere.

In the following years, Denlay and Tysall mounted several larger expeditions to survey Atlanta, exploring and videoing the wreck in detail to a depth of 130 m (427 ft) at the bow. From late 1998, the civil unrest in the Solomon Islands prevented further diving around Guadalcanal for several years. On the final expedition in 1998, the then deepest wreck dive by a woman was made by Kevin's wife, Mirja, on Atlanta. Denlay's last visit to the wreck was in 2002 using a closed circuit rebreather or CCR, the first CCR dive on Atlanta.

Since then, very few dives have been conducted on Atlanta. In May 2011, a very experienced deep diving team from Global Underwater Explorers successfully videoed the wreck for documentary purposes, the first survey of the wreck since Denlay's expeditions up to 1998. A dive conducted in April 2024 by Bruce Clulow and Peter Taw found the hull and bow of the Atlanta had completely collapsed just forward of the number one 5 inch gun.

== Awards ==
Atlanta was awarded five battle stars for her World War II service and a Presidential Unit Citation for her "heroic example of invincible fighting spirit" in the battle off Guadalcanal on 13 November 1942.

== Bibliography ==
- Bullard, Thomas (1975). "Question 28/75". Warship International. XII (4): 357–358. ISSN 0043-0374.
