= Japanese destroyer Miyuki =

Fubuki-class destroyer

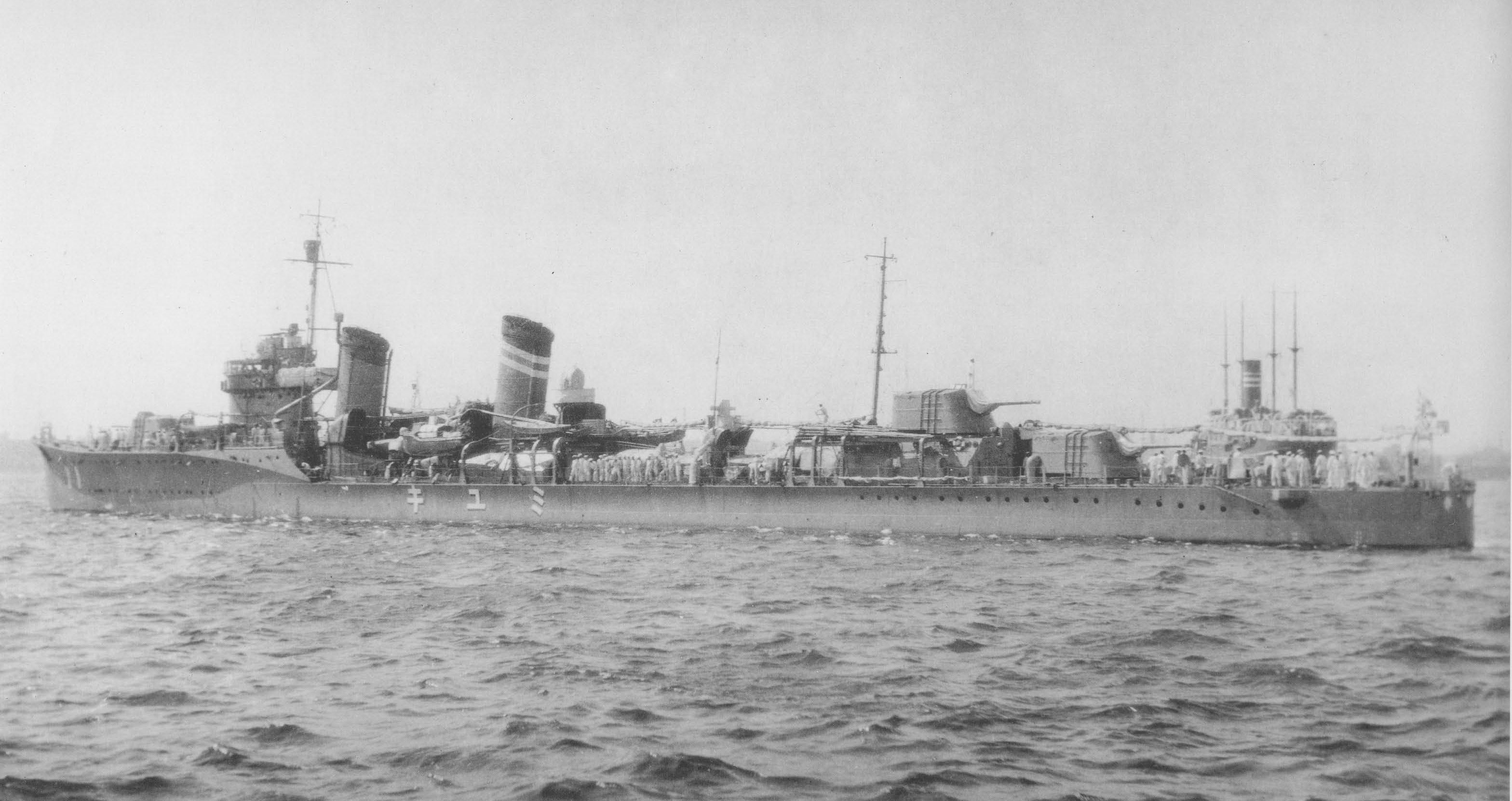
- Miyuki on 5 September 1931

History

Empire of Japan
- Name: Miyuki
- Ordered: 1923 Fiscal Year
- Builder: Uraga Dock Company
- Yard number: Destroyer No. 38
- Laid down: 30 April 1927
- Launched: 26 June 1928
- Commissioned: 29 June 1929
- Stricken: 15 August 1934
- Fate: Sunk in collision 29 June 1934

General characteristics
- Class & type: Fubuki-class destroyer
- Displacement: 1,750 long tons (1,780 t) standard; 2,050 long tons (2,080 t) re-built
- Length: 111.96 m (367.3 ft) pp; 115.3 m (378 ft) waterline; 118.41 m (388.5 ft) overall
- Beam: 10.4 m (34 ft 1 in)
- Draft: 3.2 m (10 ft 6 in)
- Propulsion: 4 × Kampon type boilers; 2 × Kampon Type Ro geared turbines; 2 × shafts at 50,000 ihp (37,000 kW)
- Speed: 38 knots (44 mph; 70 km/h)
- Range: 5,000 nmi (9,300 km) at 14 knots (26 km/h)
- Complement: 219
- Armament: 6 × Type 3 127 mm 50 caliber naval guns (3×2); up to 22 × Type 96 25 mm AT/AA Guns; up to 10 × 13 mm AA guns; 9 × 610 mm (24 in) torpedo tubes; 36 × depth charges

Miyuki (深雪, ”Deep Snow”) was the fourth of twenty-four Fubuki-class destroyers, built for the Imperial Japanese Navy (IJN) following World War I.

== History ==
Construction of the advanced Fubuki-class destroyers was authorized as part of the IJN's expansion program from fiscal 1923, intended to give Japan a qualitative edge with the world's most modern ships. The Fubuki class had performance that was a quantum leap over previous destroyer designs, so much so that they were designated Special Type destroyers (特型, Tokugata). The large size, powerful engines, high speed, large radius of action and unprecedented armament gave these destroyers the firepower similar to many light cruisers in other navies. Miyuki, built at the Uraga Dock Company was laid down on 30 April 1927, launched on 29 June 1928 and commissioned on 29 June 1929. Originally assigned hull designation “Destroyer No. 38”, she was completed as Miyuki.

== Operational history ==
Miyuki was lost in a collision with the Japanese destroyer Inazuma on 29 June 1934 in the Korea Strait, south of Cheju. (33°00′N 125°30′E) The number of casualties is not certain, but at least five crewmen perished in the accident. Miyuki was struck from the navy list on 15 August 1934.

Miyuki was the only modern Japanese destroyer that did not serve in World War II, and was the only Japanese destroyer lost in a collision with another Japanese destroyer.
