= Japanese destroyer Hibiki (1932) =

Fubuki-class destroyer

Coordinates: 42°50′48″N 131°41′56″E

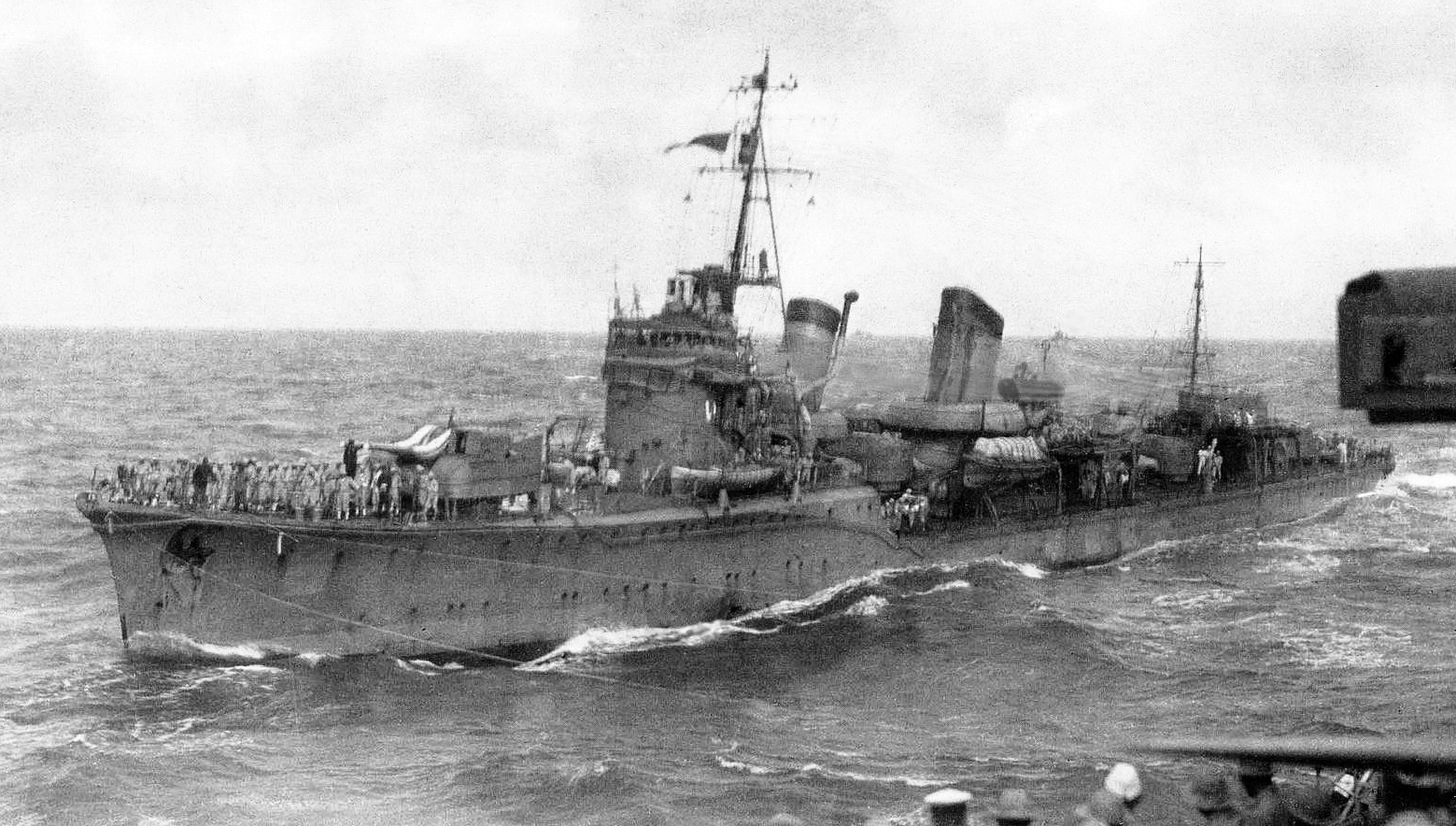
- Hibiki underway on 10 December 1941.

History

Empire of Japan
- Name: Hibiki
- Namesake: 響 ("Echo")
- Ordered: 1923 Fiscal Year
- Builder: Maizuru Naval Arsenal
- Laid down: 21 February 1930
- Launched: 16 June 1932
- Commissioned: 31 March 1933
- Stricken: 5 October 1945
- Reinstated: 1 December 1945 (as repatriation transport)
- Nickname(s): Unsinkable Ship; The Phoenix; The Destroyer Having The Destiny To Survive The War
- Fate: Handed over to USSR 5 April 1947

Soviet Union
- Name: Verniy (Верный)
- Acquired: 5 April 1947
- In service: 7 July 1947
- Renamed: Dekabrist (Декабрист), 1948
- Stricken: 20 February 1953
- Fate: Sunk as target mid-1970s

General characteristics
- Class & type: Akatsuki-class destroyer
- Displacement: 1,750 long tons (1,780 t) standard; 2,050 long tons (2,080 t) re-built
- Length: 111.96 m (367.3 ft) pp; 115.3 m (378 ft) waterline; 118.41 m (388.5 ft) overall
- Beam: 10.4 m (34 ft 1 in)
- Draft: 3.2 m (10 ft 6 in)
- Propulsion: 4 × Kampon type boilers; 2 × Kampon Type Ro geared turbines; 2 × shafts at 50,000 ihp (37,000 kW)
- Speed: 38 knots (44 mph; 70 km/h)
- Range: 5,000 nmi (9,300 km) at 14 knots (26 km/h)
- Complement: 219
- Armament: 6 × Type 3 127 mm 50 caliber naval guns (3×2); up to 22 × Type 96 25 mm AT/AA Guns; up to 10 × 13 mm AA guns; 9 × 610 mm (24 in) torpedo tubes; 36 × depth charges

Service record
- Operations: Battle of Malaya; Battle of the Philippines (1941–42); Aleutian campaign; Battle of the Philippine Sea

Hibiki (響, "Echo") was the twenty-second of twenty-four Fubuki-class destroyers, or the second of the Akatsuki class (if that sub-class is regarded independently), built for the Imperial Japanese Navy in the inter-war period. Hibiki was among the few destroyers to survive the war. In 1947; two years after she was struck from the Japanese navy list, Hibiki was transferred to the Soviet Navy as a war reparation, and was later sunk as a target ship sometime in the 1970s.

== History ==
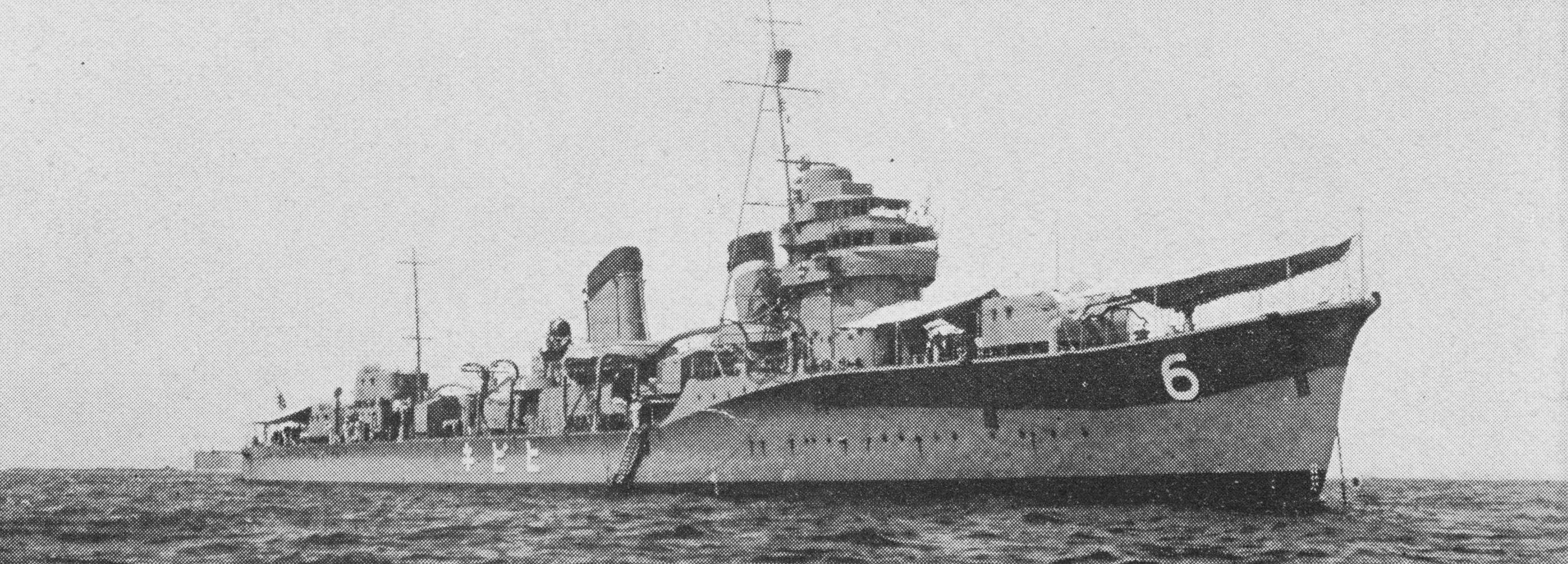
Hibiki

Construction of the advanced Fubuki-class destroyers was authorized as part of the Imperial Japanese Navy's expansion program from fiscal 1923, intended to give Japan a qualitative edge with the world's most modern ships. The Fubuki class had performance that was a quantum leap over previous destroyer designs, so much so that they were designated Special Type destroyers (特型, Tokugata). The large size, powerful engines, high speed, large radius of action and unprecedented armament gave these destroyers the firepower similar to many light cruisers in other navies. The Akatsuki sub-class was an improved version of the Fubuki, externally almost identical, but incorporating changes to her propulsion system.

Hibiki, built at the Maizuru Naval Arsenal in Osaka was the third in the “Type III” improved series of Fubuki destroyers, incorporating a modified gun turret which could elevate her main battery of 12.7 cm/50 Type 3 naval guns to 75° as opposed to the original 40°, thus giving the gun a nominal ability as an anti-aircraft weapon. Hibiki was laid down on 21 February 1930, launched on 16 June 1932 and commissioned on 31 March 1933.

== Operational history ==
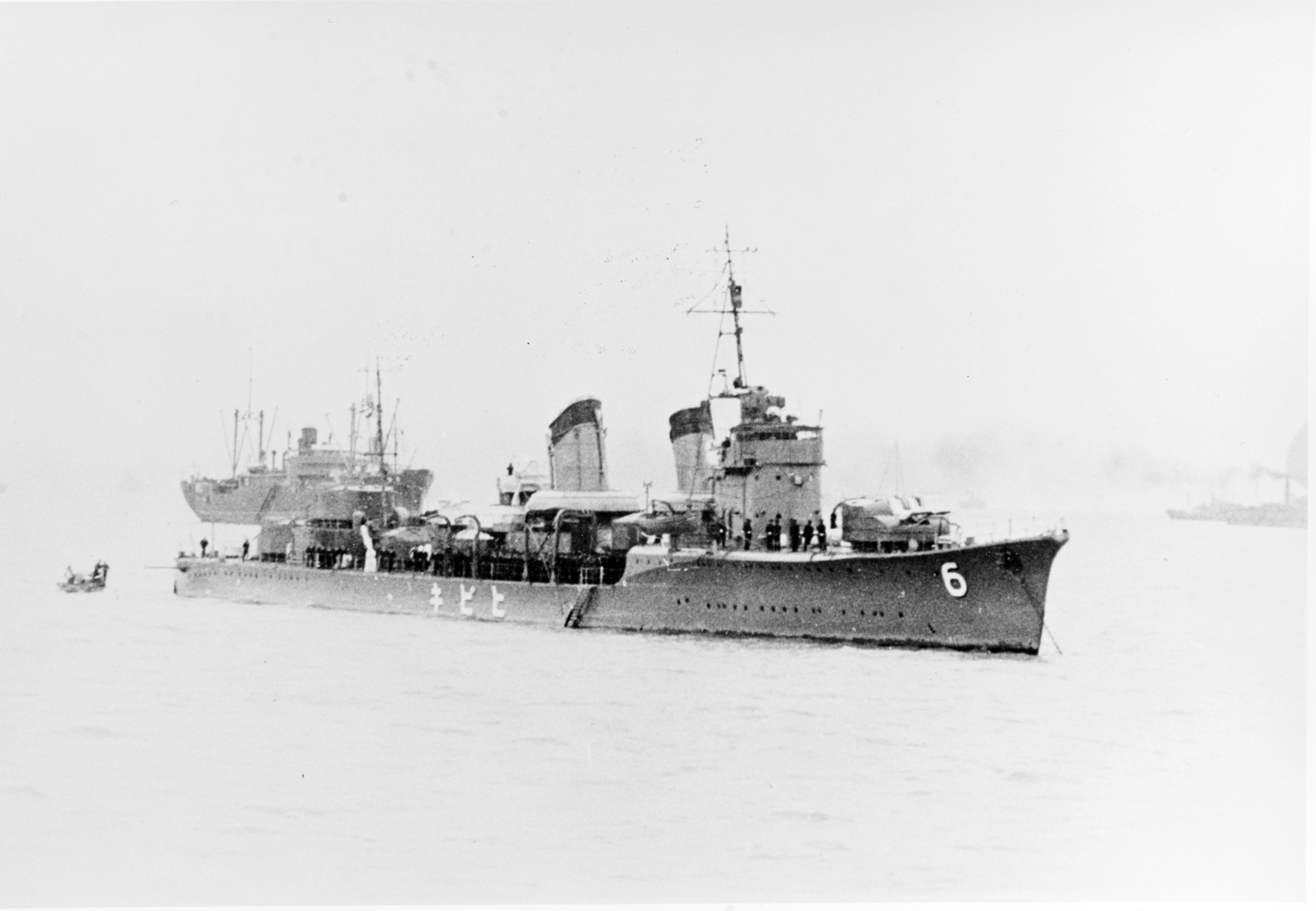
Hibiki off the coast of China, late 1930s

On completion, Hibiki along with her sister ships, Inazuma, Ikazuchi, and Akatsuki, were assigned to Destroyer Division 6.

=== World War II ===
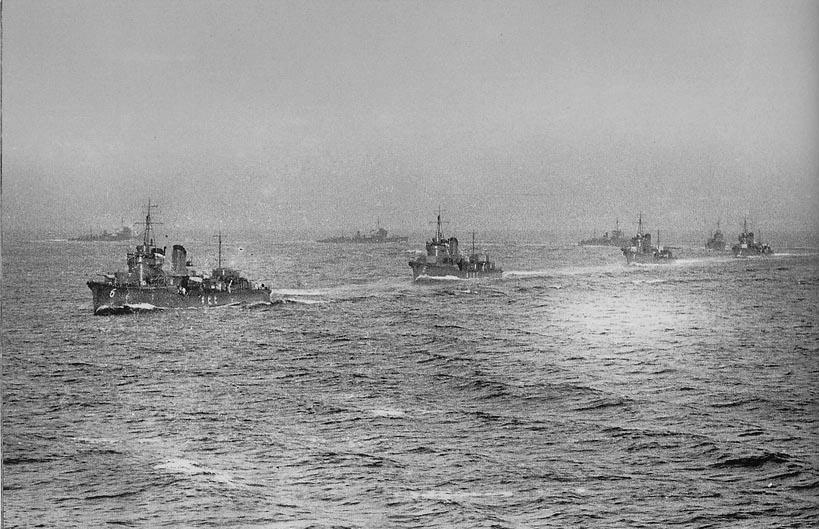
Hibiki (left) underway with Destroyer Division 6, 1942

At the time of the attack on Pearl Harbor, Hibiki was assigned to Destroyer Division 6 of Desron 1 of the IJN 1st Fleet, and had deployed from Mako Guard District to provide cover for Admiral Nobutake Kondō’s Southern Force, escorting Japanese troopships for landing operations in the Malaya and the invasion of the Philippines, and continued to support operations throughout the Philippines to the end of March 1942.

After repairs at Yokosuka Naval Arsenal in April, Hibiki deployed from Ōminato Guard District in support of the invasion of Kiska in the Aleutians campaign of May–June 1942. On 12 June, she was damaged at Kiska in an attack by United States Navy PBY Catalina flying boats, and was forced to return to Ōminato at the end of the month. Repairs at Yokosuka lasted until October.

From November 1942 through the end of April 1943, Hibiki served as an escort for aircraft carriers Unyō and Taiyō in various missions between Yokosuka and Truk, except for the month of January 1943, which she spent in dry dock at Yokosuka.

From May 1943, Hibiki returned to northern waters, and was assigned to patrols off the coast of Hokkaidō and the Chishima islands. Hibiki subsequently assisted in the evacuation of surviving Japanese forces from the Aleutians through August.

After maintenance at Yokosuka in September, Hibiki was sent to Shanghai, from which she escorted a troop convoy to Truk and Rabaul. Through the end of November, she was assigned to escort of tanker convoys between Balikpapan, Singapore and Truk and as a high speed transport between Truk, Ponape and various islands in the Carolines. She rescued the survivors from the torpedoed tanker Terukawa Maru on 21 December. From the end of December to April 1944, Hibiki served as an escort for the aircraft carriers Hiyō, Ryūhō, and Chiyoda in various missions in the western Pacific and Netherlands East Indies. She returned to Kure Naval Arsenal, for maintenance in April, during which additional anti-aircraft guns were fitted at the expense of one of her main gun turrets.

During May and June 1944, Hibiki was assigned to escort of tanker convoys. On 14 May, she rescued the 125 survivors of her torpedoed sister ship Inazuma.

During the Battle of the Philippine Sea, Hibiki was assigned to the First Supply Force, and suffered minor damage and two crewmen killed in strafing attacks by U.S. aircraft.

In August, Hibiki escorted two convoys from Moji to Takao and Okinawa. In September, after departing from Takao with a convoy bound for Manila, Hibiki was torpedoed by the submarine USS Hake; the explosion almost severed her bow. She was withdrawn back to Yokosuka for extensive repairs.

On 25 January 1945, Hibiki was reassigned to Destroyer Division 7 of the IJN 2nd Fleet, but was retained in Japanese home waters. She was then reassigned to the First Escort Fleet in May, and transferred to Kure Naval District, where she remained as a guard ship to the surrender of Japan. After the end of the war, she was demilitarized and used as a repatriation vessel, and was struck from the navy list on 5 October 1945.

== In Soviet service ==
On 5 April 1947, Hibiki was turned over to the Soviet Union at Nakhodka as a prize of war, and placed in service with the Soviet Navy under the name Verniy (Russian: Верный "Faithful" Pron.), after being rearmed with Soviet-made weapons (six 130 mm guns, seven 25 mm guns, four to six 12.7 mm machine guns, and six 533 mm torpedo tubes). She was placed in service with the Soviet Pacific Fleet based at Vladivostok on 7 July 1947. She was renamed again on 5 July 1948 as Dekabrist (Russian: Декабрист "Decembrist"). She remained at the piers for almost a year, waiting for rearming, before being retired from active service and converted into a floating barracks ship. She was retired from service on 20 February 1953 and transferred to the OMS resourcing fund. Eventually, she was used for target practice and sunk in the 1970s.

The wreck of Hibiki lies close to Karamzina Island near Vladivostok, 27 meters deep, and can be explored with diving gear. Local diving tours in Russia for exploring the wreckage can be arranged as well.
