= Japanese destroyer Akatsuki (1932) =

Fubuki-class destroyer

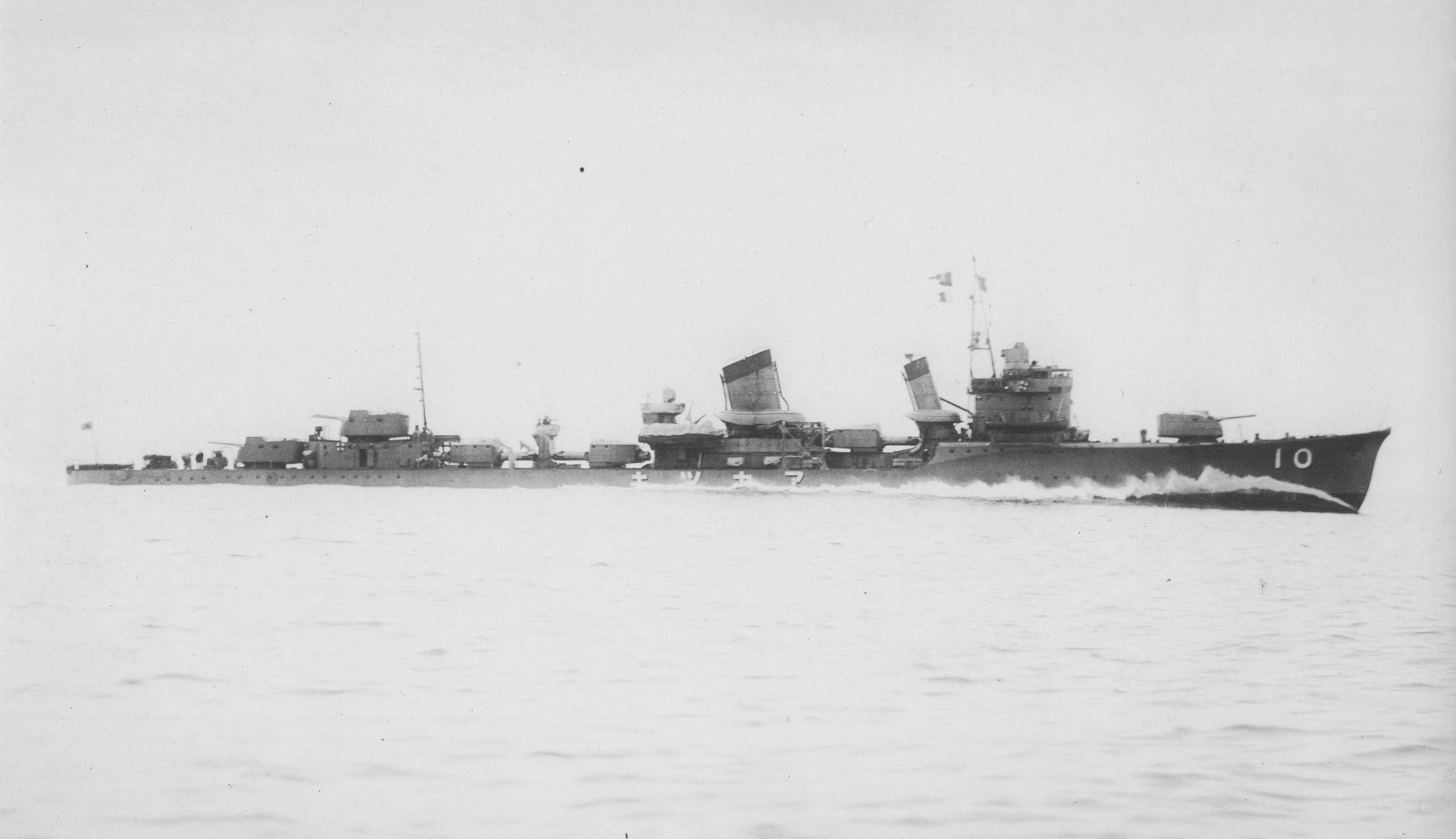
- Akatsuki underway on 18 January 1937.

History

Empire of Japan
- Name: Akatsuki
- Namesake: 暁 (Dawn)
- Ordered: 1923 Fiscal Year
- Builder: Sasebo Naval Arsenal
- Laid down: 17 February 1930
- Launched: 7 May 1932
- Commissioned: 30 November 1932
- Stricken: 15 December 1942
- Fate: Sunk in action off Guadalcanal, 13 November 1942

General characteristics
- Class & type: Akatsuki-class destroyer
- Displacement: 1,750 long tons (1,780 t) standard; 2,050 long tons (2,080 t) re-built
- Length: 111.96 m (367.3 ft) pp; 115.3 m (378 ft) waterline; 118.41 m (388.5 ft) overall
- Beam: 10.4 m (34 ft 1 in)
- Draft: 3.2 m (10 ft 6 in)
- Propulsion: 4 × Kampon type boilers; 2 × Kampon Type Ro geared turbines; 2 × shafts at 50,000 ihp (37,000 kW)
- Speed: 38 knots (44 mph; 70 km/h)
- Range: 5,000 nmi (9,300 km) at 14 knots (26 km/h)
- Complement: 219
- Armament: 6 × Type 3 127 mm 50 caliber naval guns; up to 28 × Type 96 25 mm AT/AA Gun; up to 10 × 13.2 mm (0.52 in)/76 cal. Type 93 AA guns; 9 × 24 in (610 mm) torpedo tubes for Type 93 torpedoes; 36 depth charges

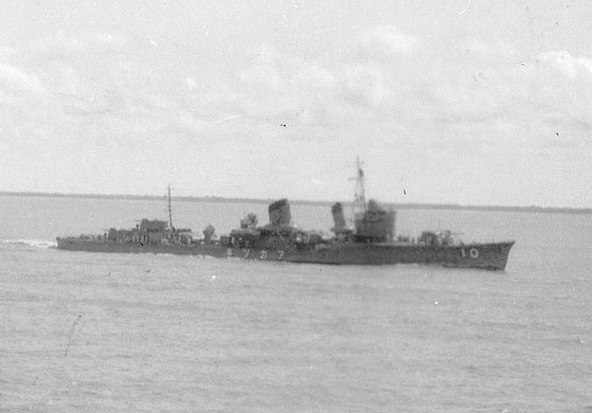
Akatsuki steaming in the Yangtse River, China, while convoying transports in August 1937 during the Second Sino-Japanese War.

Akatsuki (暁, "Dawn") was the twenty-first Fubuki-class destroyer, or the lead ship of the Akatsuki class (if that sub-class is regarded as a separate class), built for the Imperial Japanese Navy in the inter-war period.

== History ==
Construction of the advanced Fubuki-class destroyers was authorized as part of the Imperial Japanese Navy's expansion program from fiscal 1923, intended to give Japan a qualitative edge with the world's most modern ships. The Fubuki class had performance that was a quantum leap over previous destroyer designs, so much so that they were designated Special Type destroyers (特型, Tokugata). The large size, powerful engines, high speed, large radius of action and unprecedented armament gave these destroyers the firepower similar to many light cruisers in other navies. The Akatsuki sub-class was an improved version of the Fubuki, externally almost identical, but incorporating changes to her propulsion system.

Akatsuki, built at the Sasebo Naval Arsenal was the first of the “Type III” improved series of Fubuki destroyers, incorporating a modified gun turret which could elevate her main battery of Type 3 127 mm 50 caliber naval guns to 75° as opposed to the original 40°, thus permitting the guns to be used as dual purpose guns against aircraft. Akatsuki was laid down on 17 February 1930, launched on 7 May 1932 and commissioned on 30 November 1932.

== Operational history ==
On completion, Akatsuki was assigned to Destroyer Division 6 along with her sister ships, Inazuma, Hibiki, and Ikazuchi, under the IJN 1st Fleet. She was taking part in maneuvers off Ise Bay on 1 August 1935 when she collided with the submarine I-6 at 14:27. I-6 suffered damage to her periscopes.

Like others of her type, Akatsuki was modified during the middle 1930s, both to correct design deficiencies and to enhance combat capabilities. She participated in operations in the Second Sino-Japanese War, which broke out in July 1937.

=== World War II ===
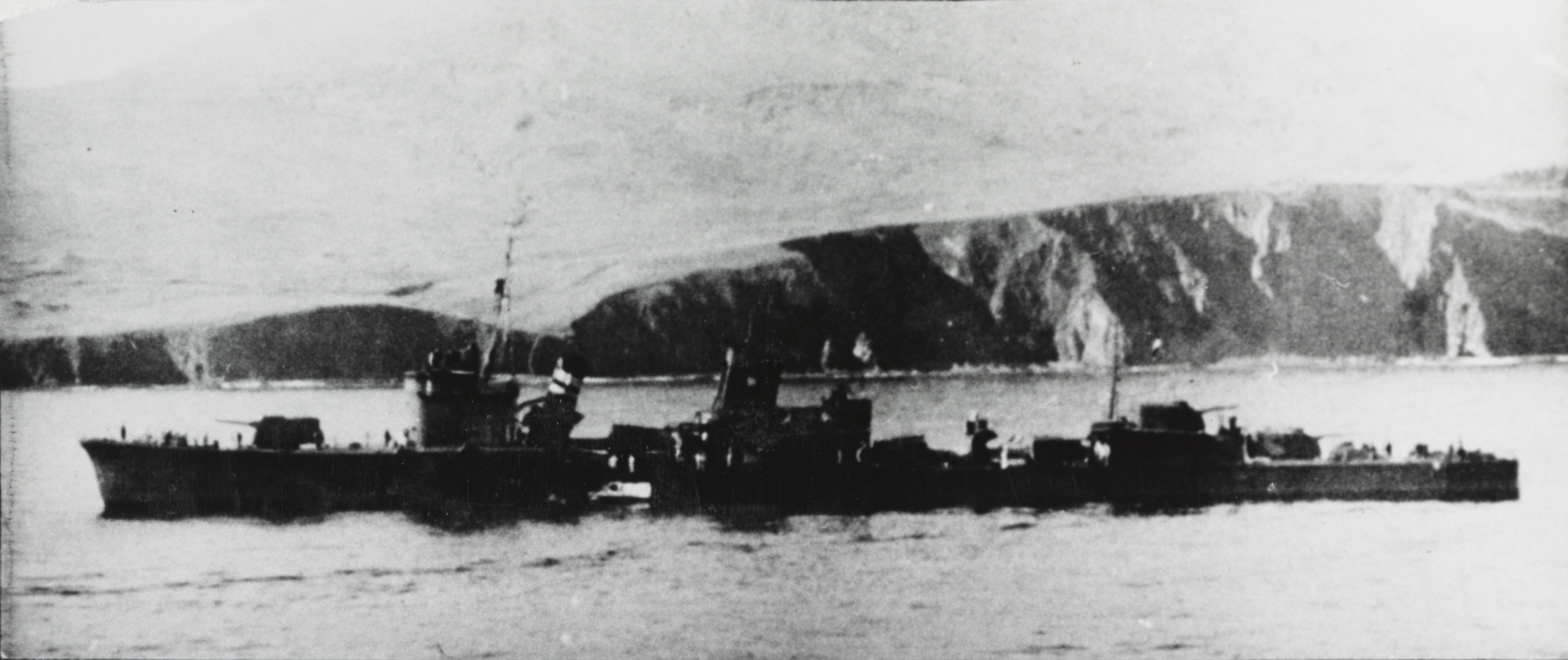
Akatsuki at Kiska Island, Aleutians, during the Japanese occupation of Kiska, summer of 1942

At the time of the attack on Pearl Harbor, Akatsuki was assigned to Destroyer Division 6 of Desron 1 of the IJN 1st Fleet, and had deployed from Mako Guard District to provide cover for landing operations in British Malaya and later for in operations against the Netherlands East Indies, including the invasion of western Java and in the Philippines. She attacked, but failed to sink the submarine USS Permit on 17 March 1942.

After returning to Yokosuka Naval Arsenal for maintenance in March 1942, Akatsuki was reassigned to northern operations, and deployed from Ōminato Guard District in support of Admiral Boshiro Hosogaya’s Northern Force in the Aleutians campaign, patrolling waters around Kiska and Attu during June and July, and towing the damaged Hibiki from Kiska back to Paramushiro in the Chishima Islands. She continued to be assigned to northern patrols in the Chishima islands and Aleutian Islands through the beginning of August. After maintenance at Yokosuka in late July, Akatsuki was reassigned as escort for the new aircraft carriers Zuihō and Unyō, which it accompanied to Truk, and missions in the Solomon Islands and back to Kure Naval District.

From October, Akatsuki was used for numerous “Tokyo Express” high speed transport runs throughout the Solomon Islands.

On October 25, 1942 Akatsuki, Ikazuchi, and Shiratsuyu conducted a daylight raid into the waters of "Ironbottom Sound" off Guadalcanal. In the resulting action, the fast minesweeper USS Zane was damaged and fleet tug USS Seminole and patrol craft YP-284 were sunk before the Japanese ships were driven off by US Marine coastal artillery. Akatsuki suffered light damage when its No.3 gun turret was hit by coastal artillery, with four crewmen killed.

Three weeks later, Akatsuki returned to "Ironbottom Sound" as part of a powerful bombardment force built around the battleships Hiei and Kirishima. On the night of 12–13 November 1942, in the Naval Battle of Guadalcanal, this unit encountered a task force of U.S. Navy destroyers and cruisers. Operating on the right flank of the Japanese battleships, Akatsuki is often credited with illuminating and then torpedoing USS Atlanta: however, her junior torpedo officer, Michiharu Shinya – one of her few survivors – later stated unequivocally that Akatsuki was overwhelmed by gunfire before being able to launch any torpedoes. Soon after illuminating Atlanta, she was heavily hit by American gunfire and sank early in the action near Savo Island at position 09°17′S 159°56′E, with the loss of all but 18 crewmen (out of a total complement of 197), who were later captured by U.S. forces. These crewmen were later imprisoned at the Featherston prisoner of war camp in New Zealand.

On 15 December 1942, Akatsuki was removed from the navy list.
