= Fubuki-class destroyer =

Class of destroyers of the Imperial Japanese Navy

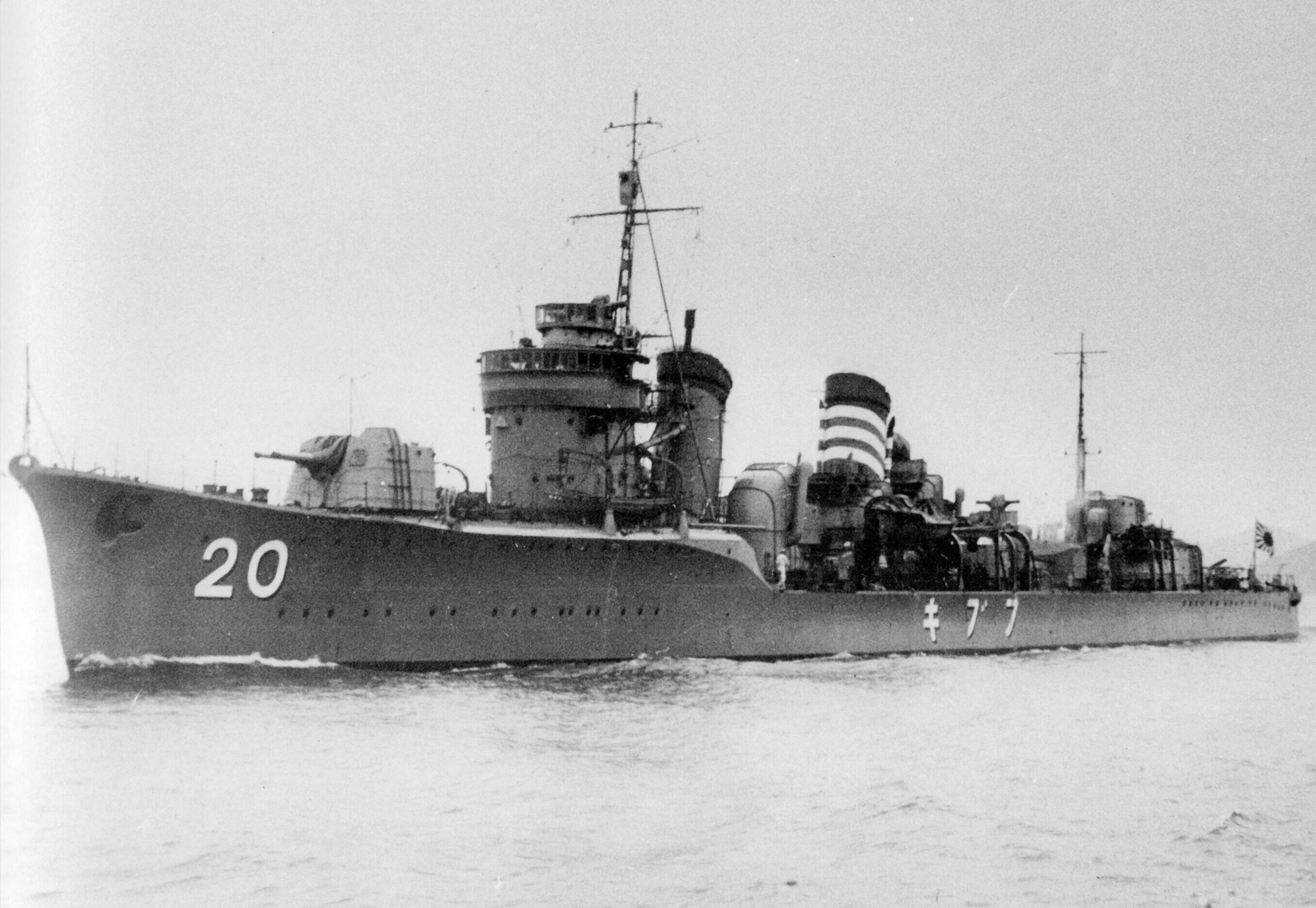
- Fubuki (1936)

Class overview
- Name: Fubuki class
- Builders: Maizuru Naval Arsenal (6); Sasebo Naval Arsenal (6); Uraga Dock Company (5); Fujinagata Shipyards (4); Tōkyō Ishikawajima Shipyard (2); Mitsubishi Shipbuilding & Eng. Co.; Yokohama Shipyard (1)
- Operators: Imperial Japanese Navy; Soviet Navy (post-war with Hibiki)
- Preceded by: Mutsuki class
- Succeeded by: Hatsuharu class
- Subclasses: Type I (Fubuki class); Type II (Ayanami class); Type III (Akatsuki class)
- Built: 1926–1933
- In commission: 1928–1953
- Completed: 24
- Lost: 22
- Retired: 2

General characteristics
- Type: Destroyer
- Displacement: 1,750 long tons (1,780 t) standard; 2,050 long tons (2,080 t) re-built
- Length: 111.96 m (367.3 ft) pp; 115.3 m (378 ft) waterline; 118.41 m (388.5 ft) overall
- Beam: 10.4 m (34 ft 1 in)
- Draft: 3.2 m (10 ft 6 in)
- Propulsion: 2 shaft Kampon geared turbines; 4 (Groups I & II) or 3 (Group III) boilers; 50,000 hp (37,000 kW)
- Speed: 38 knots (44 mph; 70 km/h)
- Range: 5,000 nmi (9,300 km) at 14 knots (26 km/h)
- Complement: 219
- Armament: 6 × Type 3 127 mm 50 caliber naval guns (3 × 2); 2 × Type 93 13mm machine guns (2 × 1); 9 × 610 mm (24 in) torpedo tubes (3 × 3); 18 × 8th Year Type torpedoes (later replaced to the Type 90 torpedo); 18 × depth charges

The Fubuki-class destroyers (吹雪型駆逐艦, Fubukigata kuchikukan) were a class of twenty-four destroyers of the Imperial Japanese Navy. The Fubuki class has been described as the world's first modern destroyer. They remained effective in their role to the end of World War II, despite being much older than contemporary ships of foreign nations.

== Background ==
Following the ratification of the Washington Naval Treaty in 1922, the Imperial Japanese Navy General Staff issued requirements for a destroyer with a maximum speed of 39 knots (72 km/h; 45 mph), range of 4,000 nautical miles (7,400 km; 4,600 mi) at 14 knots (26 km/h; 16 mph), and armed with large numbers of torpedoes. As the treaty placed Japan in an inferior position relative to the United States and Great Britain in terms of capital ships, the obvious course of action would be to build large numbers of other types of ships not restricted by the treaty, with the most powerful weaponry possible. These destroyers were intended to operate with the new series of fast and powerful cruisers also under consideration as part of a program intended to give the Imperial Japanese Navy a qualitative edge with the world's most modern ships.

The resultant Fubuki class was ordered under the 1923 fiscal year budget, based on a smaller 1750 ton design, with ships completed between 1926 and 1931. Their performance was a great improvement over previous destroyer designs, so much so that they were designated Special Type Destroyers (特型駆逐艦, Toku-gata Kuchikukan). The large size, powerful engines, high speed, large radius of action, and unprecedented armament gave these destroyers the firepower similar to many light cruisers in other navies. The closest equivalents in the United States Navy were the Porter and Somers-class destroyers, of which only thirteen vessels were constructed in the 1930s to function as destroyer squadron leaders.

== Design ==
The initial design for the Fubuki-class was based on a 2000-ton displacement hull with a single 12.7 cm (5.0 in) battery, two twin 24-inch torpedo tubes (as introduced in Mutsuki), and capable of 40 knots (74 km/h). Following the adoption of the Washington Naval Treaty from 1923, the design was modified to 1680 standard tons with more guns and more torpedo tubes. However, their increased displacement more than offset their more powerful engines, resulting in a slower top speed than originally planned.

The engines were powered by four Kampon boilers running two-shaft geared turbines at 50,000 shp, yielding a rated speed of 35 knots (65 km/h), with a range of 5000 nautical miles.

The S-shaped curved bow introduced on the Mutsuki class was retained; however, the well deck in front of the bridge was removed, which made it possible to extend the forecastle further aft and to flare the hull back to the first stack, which increased seaworthiness. The forecastle was also raised one deck in height to reduce the effect of heavy seas on the forward gun mount. The bridge was enlarged and enclosed. The bow was given a significant flare, to offer protection against weather in the Pacific.

The Fubuki-class vessels were originally intended to have only hull numbers. This proved to be extremely unpopular with the crews and was a constant source of confusion in communications with the earlier Kamikaze and Mutsuki classes, and naval policy was changed in August 1928. Hence, the Fubuki-class vessels were assigned names as they were launched.

Between June 1928 and March 1933, twenty-four Fubuki-class destroyers were built. Several modifications took place throughout production, and the twenty-four units can be broken down into three groups. The final four ships were so different they were given a new class name. As completed, Fubuki had twin 127mm (5-inch) guns in "A", "X", and "Y" positions, with triple torpedo tubes in "D", "P", and "Q", making them the most powerful destroyers in the world at the time of their completion.

=== Armament ===
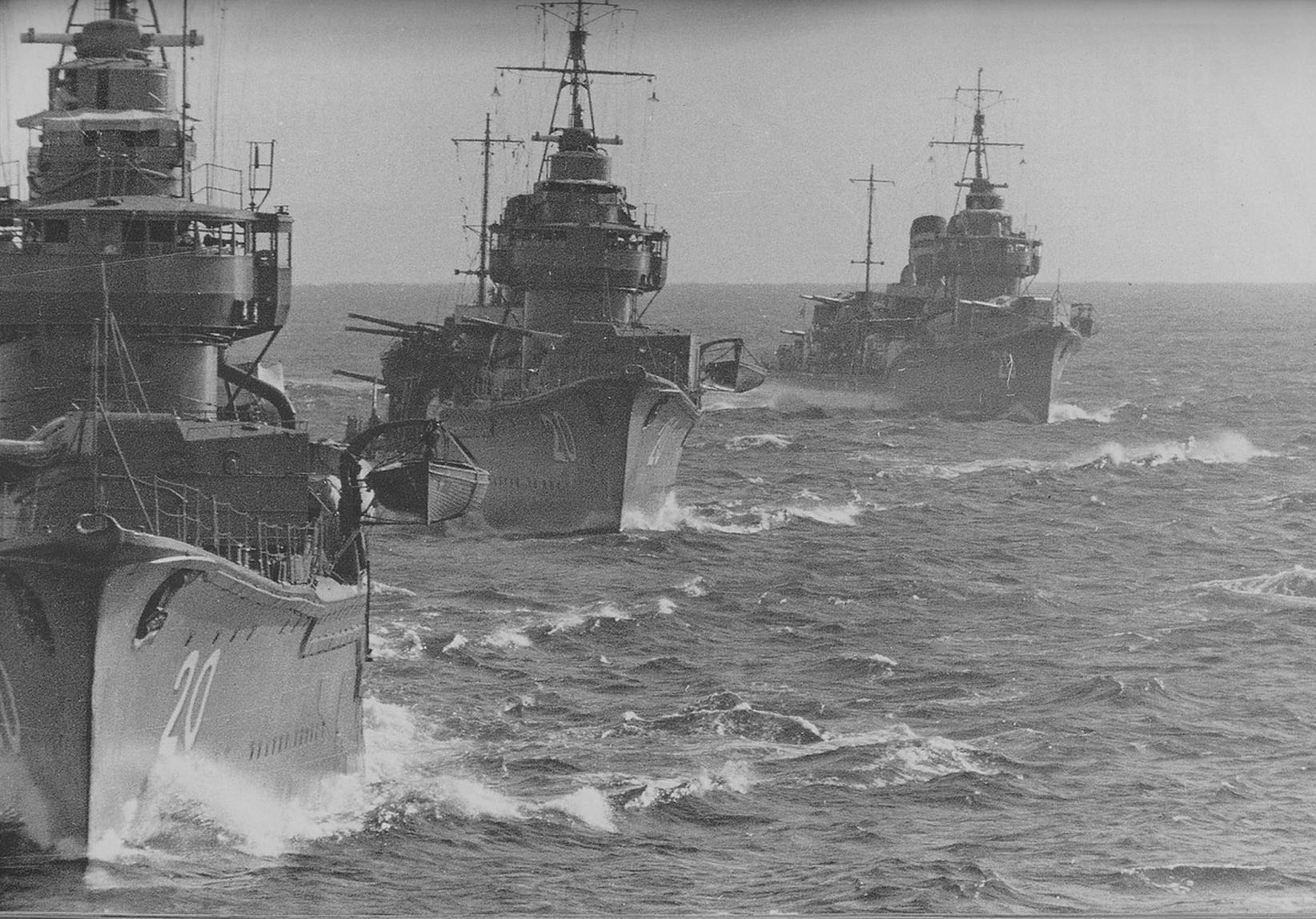
Destroyers Sagiri, Amagiri and Asagiri of the Type II of the "Fubuki"-class in exercises. The picture was taken from the Yugiri on October 16, 1941.

The Fubuki-class destroyers were far more capable than the previous Mutsuki-class in armament. The main battery consisted of six Type 3 127 mm 50 caliber naval guns, mounted in pairs in three weather-proof, splinter-proof, gas-tight gun turrets that were far ahead of their time. The Group I vessels could elevate to over 40 degrees, but from Group II (the last 14 vessels of the series), these guns were dual-purpose guns that could be elevated to 70 degrees, making them the world's first destroyers with this ability. Ammunition was brought up on hoists from magazines located directly underneath each gun turret, which had a far greater rate of fire than those of other contemporary destroyers in which ammunition was typically manually loaded. However, the gun houses were not bullet-proof, and were thus actually still gun mounts, rather than proper turrets.

The three triple 61cm (24 in) torpedo launchers with Type 8 torpedoes which had proved successful on the Mutsuki-class was again used, and each tube had a reload, giving the destroyer a complement of 18 torpedoes in total. The forward launchers were located between the smokestacks.

Anti-aircraft capability was also as per the Mutsuki-Class, with two Type 92 7.7 mm anti-aircraft machine guns located in front of the second stack. These were replaced by Type 93 13 mm AA Guns before the start of the war. Following the start of then Pacific War, a number of units received an additional pair of Type 93 guns mounted in front of the bridge, which were later changed to Type 96 25mm AA Guns. In late 1943 to early 1944, one of the aft guns was replaced with two triple Type 96 guns, and an additional raised gun platform with another two triple Type 96 guns was added between the two aft torpedo launchers, In late 1944, the remaining units received more Type 96 guns as single mounts on the forecastle and stern. Yūgiri received a Type 22 radar in November 1943, and the remaining seven units were so fitted in 1944. The few ships remaining in late 1944 also received the Type 13 radar.

== Development ==
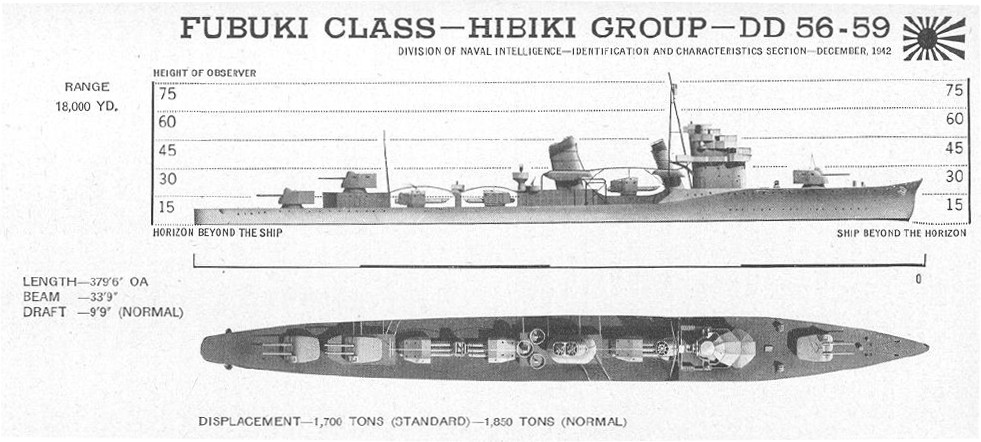
Office of Naval Intelligence (United States) recognition drawing of the Fubuki class

The first group, or Fubuki class, consisting of the first ten vessels completed in 1928 and 1929, were simpler in construction than the vessels that followed. They had a rangefinder on the compass bridge and an exposed gun-fire control room, and were equipped with a "Type A" gun turret that elevated both of its barrels at the same time and only to 40 degrees. The first group can be distinguished from later ships by their massive circular air ducts abreast the two stacks leading to the boiler room, with the exception of Uranami, which integrated the ventilation ducts into the platforms built around the stacks.

The second group, or Ayanami class, were built in 1930 and 1931, and had larger bridges that encompassed the rangefinder, an azimuth compass sighting device and the gun-fire control room, as well as a range finding tower. Furthermore, the boiler room's air inlet was changed from a pipe to a bowl shape. They also benefited from the deployment of "Type B" turrets, which could elevate each gun separately to 75° for AA use, making them the world's first destroyers with this capability.

The third group, also known as the Akatsuki class, were built from 1931 to 1933. These vessels had three larger boilers instead of the previous four and a narrower fore funnel. Improvements included a unique splinter-proof torpedo launcher-turret, which allowed the torpedo launcher tubes to be reloaded in action.

However, the Fubuki class's heavy armament and smaller hull displacement than the original design created problems with stability. Despite welding the hull and using lighter alloys above the main deck, the ships exceeded their design weight by over 200 tonnes. This was even more of a problem with the Group II ships, with their larger bridge and heavier gun mounts. After the Tomozuru Incident, which exposed some Japanese warships as top-heavy, more ballast had to be added.

In the Fourth Fleet Incident, during which a typhoon damaged virtually every ship in the Fourth Fleet, a problem with the longitudinal strength of the Fubuki-class hull was discovered. As a result, all vessels were reconstructed between 1935 and 1937. An additional 40 tons of ballast was added, the bridge reduced in size and the height of the smoke stacks was decreased. The number of torpedo reloads were reduced from nine to three (for the center launcher only), and fewer shells were stored for the guns. The amount of fuel carried was also increased to help lower the centre of gravity. Eight of the Ayanami class were retrofitted with the lighter "Type C" gun mounts. These changes increased the displacement to 2050 tons standard tons and over 2400 tons full load. The rebuild reduced the top speed slightly to 34 knots.

== Operational history ==
Of the 24 Fubuki-class vessels completed, one (Miyuki) was sunk in a collision in 1934. The remaining vessels served during the Pacific War. In November 1942, the Ayanami damaged the battleship USS South Dakota with her gunfire during the Naval Battle of Guadalcanal before being attacked by USS Washington, which crippled the battleship Kirishima as well. She was scuttled the following day by Uranami. In August 1943, John F. Kennedy's PT-109 was rammed, split asunder and sunk by Amagiri of this class.

Eight ships of the class were sunk by submarines, two by mines, the rest by air attacks. Only Hibiki and Ushio survived the war. Hibiki was taken by the Soviet Navy as a prize of war, and continued to be used until 1964.

== List of ships ==
=== Type I (Fubuki) ===
Construction data
Name	Kanji	Yard no.	Builder	Laid down	Launched	Completed	Fate
Fubuki	吹雪	Dai-35	Maizuru Naval Arsenal, Japan	19 Jun 1926	15 Nov 1927	10 Aug 1928	Sunk in surface action off Guadalcanal 09.06°S 159.38°E on 11 Oct 1942; struck 15 Nov 1942
Shirayuki	白雪	Dai-36	Yokohama Dockyard, Japan	19 Mar 1927	20 Mar 1928	18 Dec 1928	air attack off Dampir Strait 07.15°S 148.30°E on 3 Mar 1943; struck 1 Apr 1943
Hatsuyuki	初雪	Dai-37	Maizuru Naval Arsenal, Japan	12 Apr 1927	29 Sep 1928	30 Mar 1929	Air attack off Buin 06.50°S 155.47°E on 17 Jul 1943; struck 15 Oct 1943
Miyuki	深雪	Dai-38	Uraga Dock Company, Japan	30 Apr 1927	26 Jun 1928	29 Jun 1929	Collision with Inazuma, S Cheju Island 33°N 125.30°E on 29 Jun 1934; struck 15 Aug 1934
Murakumo	叢雲	Dai-39	Fujinagata Shipyards, Japan	25 Apr 1927	27 Sep 1928	10 May 1929	air attack off Guadalcanal 08.40°S 159.20°E on 12 Oct 1942; struck 15 Nov 1942
Shinonome	東雲	Dai-40	Sasebo Naval Arsenal, Japan	12 Aug 1926	26 Nov 1927	25 Jul 1928	Air attack near Miri 04.24°N 114°E on 17 Dec 1941; struck 15 Jan 1942
Usugumo	薄雲	Dai-41	Tōkyō Ishikawajima Shipyard, Japan	21 Oct 1926	26 Dec 1927	26 Jul 1928	named Usugumo 1 Aug 1928; Torpedoed off Etorofu 47.43°N 147.55°E on 7 Jul 1944; struck 10 Sep 1944
Shirakumo	白雲	Dai-42	Fujinagata Shipyards, Japan	27 Oct 1926	27 Dec 1927	28 Jul 1928	named Shiragumo 1 Aug 1928; Torpedoed off Cape Erimo 42.25°N 144.55°E on 16 Mar 1944; struck 31 Mar 1944
Isonami	磯波	Dai-43	Uraga Dock Company, Japan	18 Oct 1926	24 Nov 1927	30 Jun 1928	named Isonami on 1 Aug 1928; Torpedoed off SW Celebes 05.26°S 123.04°E on 9 Apr 1943; struck 1 Aug 1943
Uranami	浦波	Dai-44	Sasebo Naval Arsenal, Japan	28 Apr 1927	29 Nov 1928	30 Jun 1929	Air attack W of Panay 11.50°N 123°E on 26 Oct 1944; struck 10 Dec 1944

=== Type II (Ayanami) ===
Construction data
Name	Kanji	Yard no.	Builder	Laid down	Launched	Completed	Fate
Ayanami	綾波	Dai-45	Fujinagata Shipyards, Japan	20 Jan 1928	5 Oct 1929	30 Apr 1930	Scuttled off Guadalcanal by Uranami 09.10°S 159.52°E, 15 Nov 1942; struck 15 Dec 1942
Shikinami	敷波	Dai-46	Maizuru Naval Arsenal, Japan	6 Jul 1928	22 Jun 1929	24 Dec 1929	Torpedoed S of Hainan 18.16°N 114.40°E 12 Sep 1944; struck 10 Oct 1944
Asagiri	朝霧	Dai-47	Sasebo Naval Arsenal, Japan	12 Dec 1928	18 Nov 1929	30 Jun 1930	Air attack off Guadalcanal 08°S 160.10°E on 28 Aug 1942; struck 1 Oct 1942
Yūgiri	夕霧	Dai-48	Maizuru Naval Arsenal, Japan	1 Apr 1929	12 May 1930	3 Dec 1930	Sunk in action, central Solomons 04.44°S 154°E on 25 Nov 1943; struck 15 Dec 1943
Amagiri	天霧	Dai-49	Ishikawajima Shipyards, Japan	28 Nov 1928	27 Feb 1930	10 Nov 1930	Mined, S of Makassar Strait 02.10°S 116.45°E on 23 Apr 1944; struck 10 Jun 1944
Sagiri	狭霧	Dai-50	Uraga Dock Company, Japan	28 Mar 1929	23 Dec 1929	30 Jan 1931	Torpedoed off Kuching 01.34°N 110.21°E on 24 Dec 1941; struck 15 Jan 1942
Oboro	朧	Dai-51	Sasebo Naval Arsenal, Japan	29 Nov 1929	8 Nov 1930	31 Oct 1931	Air attack off Kiska Island 52.17°N 178.08°E on 16 Oct 1942; struck 15 Nov 1942
Akebono	曙	Dai-52	Sasebo Naval Arsenal, Japan	25 Oct 1929	7 Nov 1930	31 Jul 1931	Air attack Manila Bay 14.35°N 120.50°E on 13 Nov 1944; struck 10 Jan 1945
Sazanami	漣	Dai-53	Maizuru Naval Arsenal, Japan	21 Feb 1930	6 Jun 1931	19 May 1932	Torpedoed E of Palau 05.15°N 141.15°E on 14 Jan 1944; struck 10 Mar 1944
Ushio	潮	Dai-54	Uraga Dock Company, Japan	24 Dec 1929	17 Nov 1930	14 Nov 1931	surrendered to Allies 15 Sep 1945; scrapped 1948

=== Type III (Akatsuki) ===
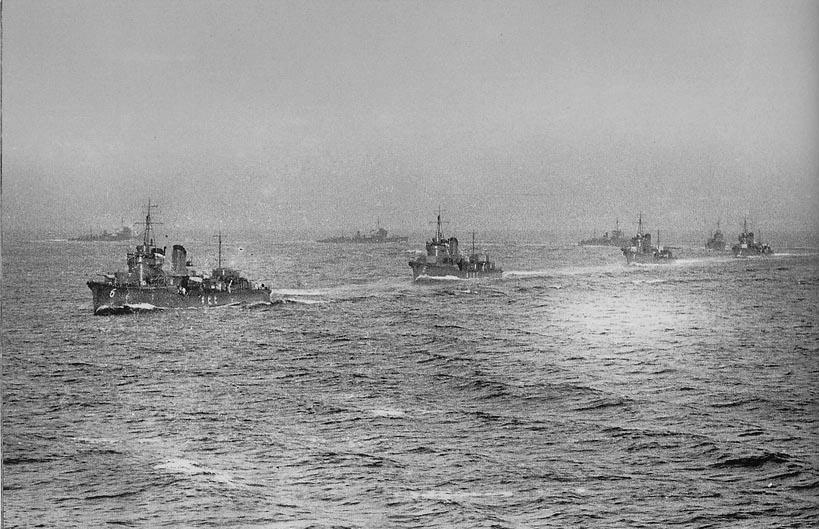
Hibiki, Akatsuki, Ikazuchi, and Inazuma navigating in a single column formation. Behind them sails destroyer division 27's Shigure, Shiratsuyu, Ariake, and Yūgure

Construction data
Name	Kanji	Builder	Laid down	Launched	Completed	Fate
Akatsuki	暁	Sasebo Naval Arsenal, Japan	17 Feb 1930	7 May 1932	30 Nov 1932	Sunk in action off Guadalcanal 09.17°S 159.56°E on 13 Nov 1942; struck 15 Dec 1942
Hibiki	響	Maizuru Naval Arsenal, Japan	21 Feb 1930	16 Jun 1932	31 Mar 1933	surrendered 5 Oct 1945; prize of war to USSR on 5 Jul 1947; sunk as target around 1970s
Ikazuchi	雷	Uraga Dock Company, Japan	7 Mar 1930	22 Oct 1931	15 Aug 1932	torpedoed W of Guam 10.13°N 143.51°E on 13 Apr 1944; struck 10 Jun 1944
Inazuma	電	Fujinagata Shipyards, Japan	7 Mar 1930	25 Feb 1932	15 Nov 1932	Torpedoed W of Celebes 05.08°N 119.38°E on 14 May 1944; struck 10 Jun 1944
