= Japanese destroyer Ikazuchi (1931) =

Fubuki-class destroyer

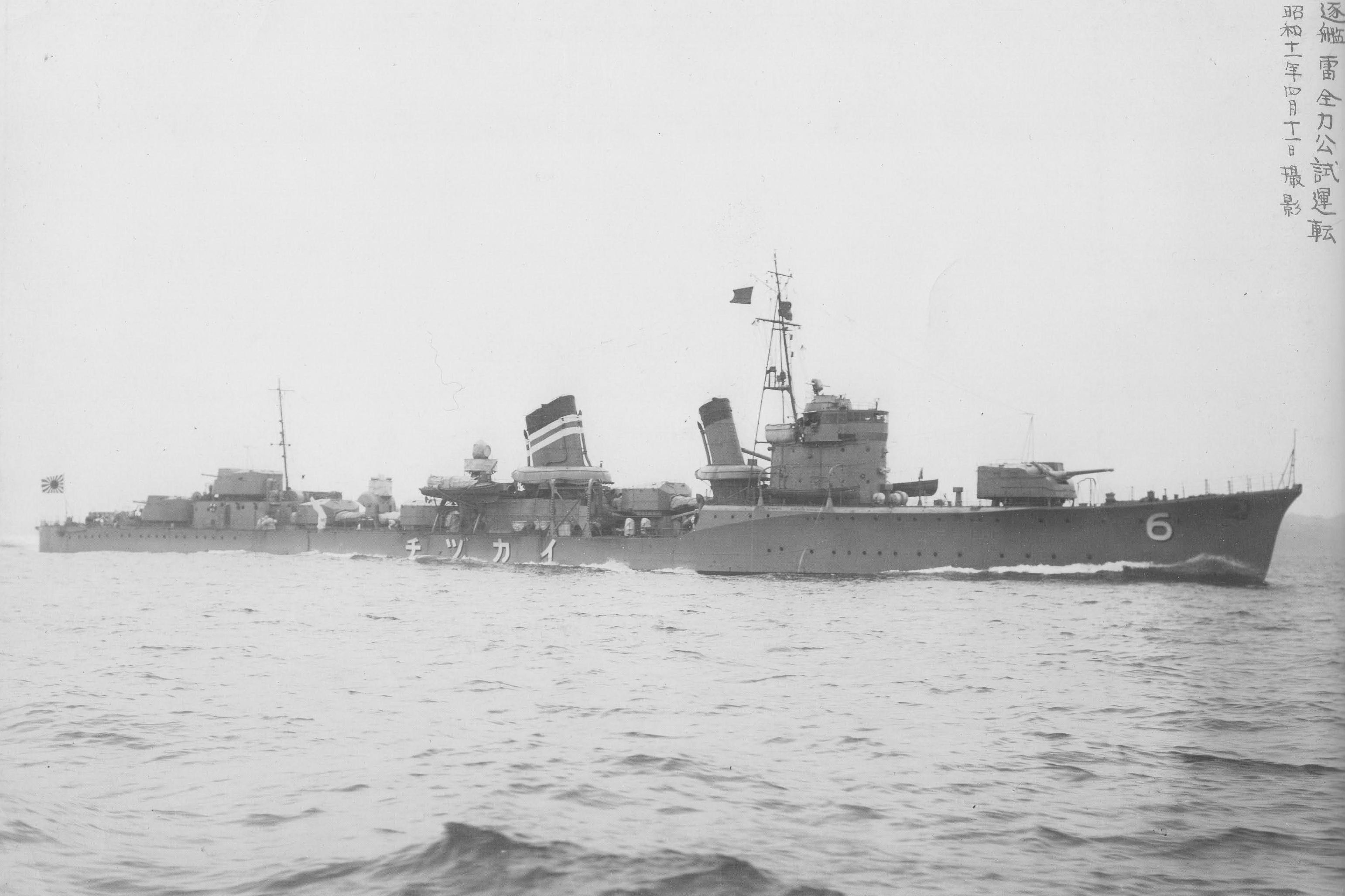
- Ikazuchi underway on 11 April 1936

History

Empire of Japan
- Name: Ikazuchi
- Namesake: 雷 ("Thunder")
- Ordered: 1923 Fiscal Year
- Builder: Uraga Dock Company
- Laid down: 7 March 1930
- Launched: 22 October 1931
- Commissioned: 15 August 1932
- Stricken: 10 June 1944
- Fate: Sunk, 13 April 1944

General characteristics
- Class & type: Fubuki-class destroyer
- Displacement: 1,750 long tons (1,780 t) standard; 2,050 long tons (2,080 t) re-built
- Length: 111.96 m (367.3 ft) pp; 115.3 m (378 ft) waterline; 118.41 m (388.5 ft) overall
- Beam: 10.4 m (34 ft 1 in)
- Draft: 3.2 m (10 ft 6 in)
- Propulsion: 4 × Kampon type boilers; 2 × Kampon Type Ro geared turbines; 2 × shafts at 50,000 ihp (37,000 kW)
- Speed: 38 knots (44 mph; 70 km/h)
- Range: 5,000 nmi (9,300 km) at 14 knots (26 km/h)
- Complement: 219
- Armament: 6 × Type 3 127 mm 50 caliber naval guns (3×2); up to 22 × Type 96 25 mm AT/AA Guns; up to 10 × 13 mm AA guns; 9 × 610 mm (24 in) torpedo tubes; 36 × depth charges

Service record
- Operations: Battle of Hong Kong; Battle of Sunda Strait; Aleutian campaign; Solomons campaign

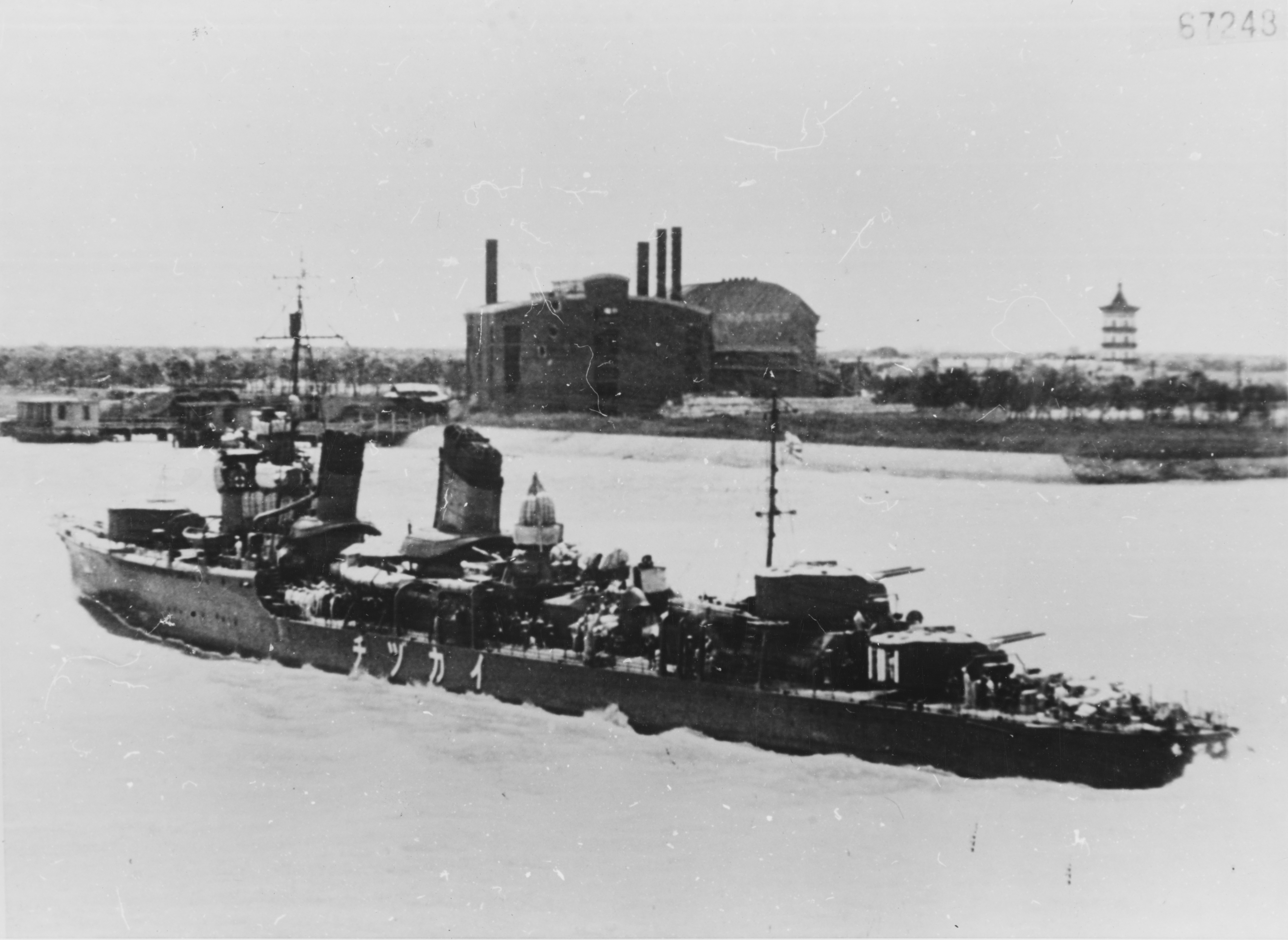
Ikazuchi underway off China in 1938

Ikazuchi (雷, "Thunder") was the twenty-third Fubuki-class destroyer, or the third Akatsuki class (if that sub-class is regarded as a separate class), built for the Imperial Japanese Navy in the inter-war period.

Ikazuchi, built at the Uraga Dock Company, was the third of the "Type III" improved series of Fubuki destroyers, incorporating a modified gun turret which could elevate her main battery of Type 3 127 mm 50 caliber naval guns to 75° as opposed to the original 40°, thus permitting the guns to be used as dual purpose guns against aircraft. Ikazuchi was laid down on 7 March 1930, launched on 22 October 1931 and commissioned on 15 August 1932.

== History ==
Construction of the advanced Akatsuki-class destroyers was authorized as part of the Imperial Japanese Navy's expansion program from fiscal 1923, intended to give Japan a qualitative edge with the world's most modern ships. The Akatsuki class had performance that was a quantum leap over previous destroyer designs, so much so that they were designated Special Type destroyers (特型, Tokugata). The large size, powerful engines, high speed, large radius of action and unprecedented armament gave these destroyers the firepower similar to many light cruisers in other navies. The Akatsuki sub-class was an improved version of the Fubuki, externally almost identical, but incorporating changes to her propulsion system.

== Operational history ==
On completion, Ikazuchi was assigned to Destroyer Division 6 along with her sister ships, Inazuma, Hibiki, and Akatsuki, under the IJN 1st Fleet and participated in operations in the Second Sino-Japanese War.

=== World War II ===
At the time of the attack on Pearl Harbor, Ikazuchi was assigned to Destroyer Division 6 of Desron 1 of the IJN 1st Fleet, and had deployed from Mako Guard District to provide cover for landing operations in the Invasion of Hong Kong. After assisting the cruiser Isuzu in sinking British gunboats HMS Cicada and HMS Robin, she helped secure Victoria Harbour. After the start of 1942, Ikazuchi deployed from Hong Kong to Davao, providing cover for landing operations during the Battle of Ambon, and Battle of Timor in the Netherlands East Indies.

On 2 March 1942, Ikazuchi rescued the remaining 400 odd survivors who were still in the water from the Royal Navy cruiser HMS Exeter (some of whose survivors had been rescued on 1 March) and the destroyer HMS Encounter, both ships having been sunk the previous day in the Second Battle of the Java Sea between Java and Borneo. The survivors had been adrift for some 20 hours, in rafts and life jackets or clinging to floats, many coated in oil and unable to see. Among the rescued was Lieutenant (later Sir) Sam Falle, an officer aboard Encounter, who would go on to become a British diplomat. This humanitarian decision by Lieutenant Commander Shunsaku Kudō placed Ikazuchi at risk of submarine attack, and interfered with her fighting ability due to the sheer numbers of rescued sailors. The action was later the subject of a book and a 2007 TV programme.

Ikazuchi deployed from Ōminato Guard District in support of Admiral Boshiro Hosogaya’s Northern Force in the Aleutians campaign, patrolling waters around Kiska and Attu during June and July, and towing the damaged destroyer Kasumi from Kiska back to Shimushu in the Chishima Islands. She continued to be assigned to northern patrols in the Chishima islands and Aleutian Islands through the beginning of August.

From September, Ikazuchi was reassigned as escort for the new aircraft carriers Zuihō and Unyō, which the destroyer accompanied to Truk, and missions in the Solomon Islands and back to Kure Naval District.

From October, Ikazuchi was used for numerous “Tokyo Express" high speed transport runs throughout the Solomon Islands.

On 25 October 1942 Ikazuchi, Akatsuki, and Shiratsuyu conducted a daylight raid into the waters off Guadalcanal. In the resulting action, the fast minesweeper USS Zane was damaged and fleet tug USS Seminole and patrol craft YP-284 were sunk before the Japanese ships were driven off by US Marine coastal artillery. Ikazuchi suffered light damage from strafing attacks by Allied aircraft, with four crewmen killed.

Ikazuchi participated in the first night action of the Naval Battle of Guadalcanal on 13 November 1942. Stationed on the right flank of the battleships Hiei and Kirishima with two other destroyers, she engaged several U.S. warships, among them the cruiser USS Atlanta, and received hits to her forward gun mount, which caught fire. In the battle, 21 crewmen were killed and 20 injured, and she had to return to Truk for emergency repairs.

After repairs at Yokosuka Naval Arsenal from December to the end of February 1943, Ikazuchi returned to the north Pacific, and was present at the Battle of the Komandorski Islands on 26 March but saw no action. On 30 March, she collided with the destroyer Wakaba, suffering moderate damage. Ikazuchi was reassigned to Desron 11 of the IJN 1st Fleet on 1 April 1943. After repairs at Yokosuka, she returned to Truk, and escorted convoys between Truk and the Japanese home islands until mid-April 1944.

Under the command of Lieutenant Commander Ikunaga Kunio, on 13 April 1944, while escorting the transport Sanyō Maru to Woleai, Ikazuchi was torpedoed and sunk by the submarine USS Harder, approximately 200 nautical miles (370 km) south-southwest of Guam at position 10°13′N 143°51′E. There were no survivors. On 10 June 1944, Ikazuchi was removed from the navy list.
