= Akatsuki-class destroyer (1931) =

Destroyer class of the Imperial Japanese Navy

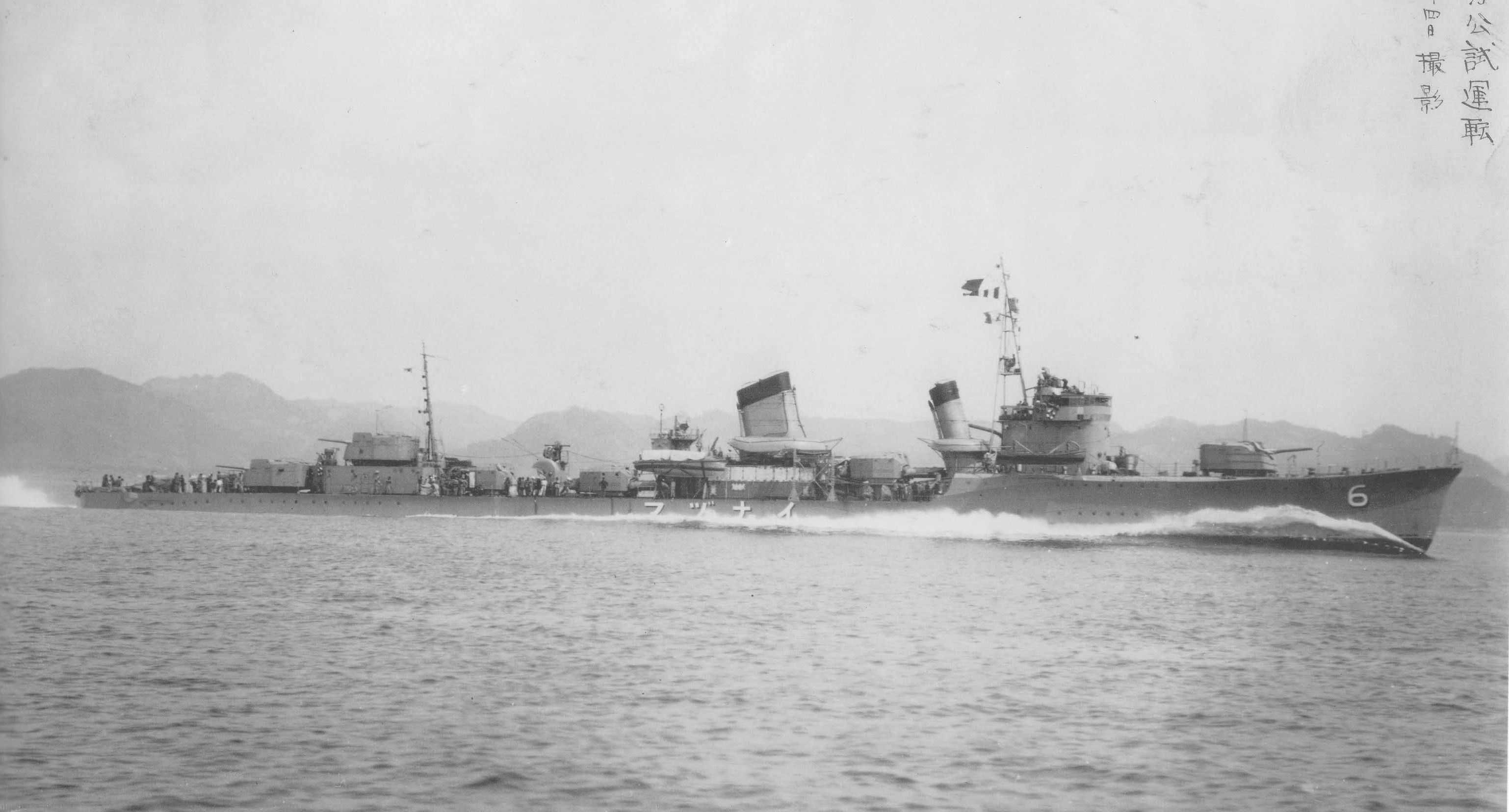
- Inazuma underway, circa 1936

Class overview
- Name: Akatsuki class
- Builders: Sasebo Naval Arsenal; Maizuru Naval Arsenal; Uraga Dock Company; Fujinagata Shipyards
- Operators: Imperial Japanese Navy
- Preceded by: Fubuki class
- Succeeded by: Hatsuharu class
- In commission: 1932–1944
- Completed: 4
- Lost: 3
- Retired: 1

General characteristics
- Type: Destroyer
- Displacement: 1,750 long tons (1,778 t)
- Length: 118.5 m (388 ft 9 in)
- Beam: 10.4 m (34 ft 1 in)
- Draft: 3.2 m (10 ft 6 in)
- Propulsion: 2 shaft Kampon geared turbines; 3 boilers; 50,000 hp (37,000 kW)
- Speed: 38 knots (70 km/h; 44 mph)
- Range: 5,000 nmi (9,300 km; 5,800 mi) at 14 knots (26 km/h; 16 mph)
- Complement: 233
- Armament: 3 × twin Type 3 127 mm 50 caliber naval guns; 2 × single Type 93 13 mm machine guns; 3 × triple 610 mm (24 in) torpedo tubes; 18 × Type 93 torpedoes; 18 × depth charges

The Akatsuki-class destroyer (暁型駆逐艦, Akatsuki-gata kuchikukan) was a class of four destroyers of the Imperial Japanese Navy. According to most sources, they are regarded as a sub-class of the Fubuki class, partly because the Imperial Japanese Navy itself kept the improvements made a secret, and did not officially designate these four destroyers as a separate class.

== Background ==
After a number of years of operational experience with the Fubuki class, the Imperial Japanese Navy General Staff issued requirements for four additional Special Type (特型, Tokugata) destroyers, with a maximum speed of 39 knots (72 km/h), range of 4,000 nautical miles (7,400 km) at 14 knots (26 km/h), and armed with Type 8 torpedoes. These destroyers were intended to operate with the new series of fast and powerful cruisers also under consideration as part of a program intended to give the Imperial Japanese Navy a qualitative edge with the world's most modern ships. The new vessels were built from 1931 to 1933.

== Design ==
The main difference in design between the Akatsuki vessels and the standard Fubuki-class was the use of a new high-pressure boiler, which enabled the number of boilers to be reduced from four to three without a reduction in power. This also enabled the fore smokestack to be made narrower than on standard Fubuki-class vessels, and this feature was the most evident visual recognition feature between the two designs. Other improvements over the Fubuki class included a larger bridge structure, with the addition of another level to house improved fire control facilities, and a splinter-proof torpedo launcher/turret, which allowed the torpedo launcher tubes to be reloaded in action. The four ships incorporated many weight-saving measures, and Hibiki was the first all-welded Japanese ship.

However, the Akatsuki class shared a number of inherent design problems with the Fubuki class. The large amount of armament combined with a smaller hull displacement than in the original design created issues with stability. After the Tomozuru Incident, in which the basic design of many Japanese warships was called into question, additional ballast had to be added. In the Fourth Fleet Incident, during which a typhoon damaged virtually every ship in the Fourth Fleet, issues with the longitudinal strength of the Akatsuki-class hull was discovered. As a result, all vessels were reconstructed from 1935 to 1937. An additional 40 tons of ballast was added, the bridge reduced in size and the height of the smoke stacks was decreased. The number of torpedo reloads were reduced from nine to three (for the center launcher only), and fewer shells were stored for the guns. The amount of fuel carried was also increased to help lower the center-of-gravity. This increased the displacement to 2050 tons standard load and over 2400 tons full load. The rebuild reduced the top speed slightly to 34 knots.

=== Armament ===
The main battery consisted of six Type 3 127 mm 50 caliber naval guns, mounted in pairs in three weather-proof, splinter-proof, gas-tight gun turrets. These guns were dual purpose guns that could be elevated to 75 degrees, making them the world's first destroyers with this ability. Ammunition was brought up on hoists from magazines located directly underneath each gun turret, which had a far greater rate of fire than those of other contemporary destroyers in which ammunition was typically manually loaded. However, the gun houses were not bulletproof, and were thus actually still gun mounts, rather than proper turrets.

The three triple 24-inch (610 mm) torpedo launchers used on the standard Fubuki class were retained, and originally Type 8 torpedoes were carried. These were later replaced with the Type 93 "Long Lance" oxygen-propelled torpedoes during World War II.

Anti-aircraft capability was initially two Type 93 13 mm AA guns mounted in front of the second stack. In 1943, an additional pair of Type 93 guns was mounted in front of the bridge, which was later changed to Type 96 25 mm AA guns on Hibiki and Ikazuchi in January 1944. These vessels also lost one of their aft guns in April 1944 in exchange for two triple Type 96 guns, and another pair of triple Type 96 guns was added between the aft torpedo mounts. Hibiki had another 20 single-mount Type 96s added, as well as a Type 22 and Type 13 radar, before the end of the war.

== Operational history ==
Of the four Akatsuki-class vessels, only Hibiki survived the war, and was awarded as a prize of war to the Soviet Navy, and continued to be used a floating barracks ship until retirement in 1953. Eventually, she was used as target practice in the 1970s, where she was finally sunk. Akatsuki was lost at the Naval Battle of Guadalcanal in November 1942, where she was sunk by American cruiser and destroyer gunfire. Ikazuchi was sunk while escorting a convoy 200 miles south-southeast of Guam on April 14, 1944, by the submarine USS Harder. Inazuma exploded after being struck by torpedoes launched by USS Bonefish in the Celebes Sea near Tawitawi on 14 May 1944.

== List of ships ==
=== Type III (Akatsuki) ===
List of Akatsuki-class destroyers (1931)
Kanji	Name	Builder	Laid down	Launched	Completed	Fate
暁	Akatsuki	Sasebo Naval Arsenal, Japan	17 February 1930	7 May 1932	30 November 1932	Sunk in action off Guadalcanal on 13 November 1942; struck 15 December 1942
響	Hibiki	Maizuru Naval Arsenal, Japan	21 February 1930	16 June 1932	31 March 1933	Surrendered 5 October 1945; prize of war to USSR on 5 July 1947; sunk as target in 1970s
雷	Ikazuchi	Uraga Dock Company, Japan	7 March 1930	22 October 1931	15 August 1932	Torpedoed west of Guam on 13 April 1944; struck 10 June 1944
電	Inazuma	Fujinagata Shipyards, Japan	7 March 1930	25 February 1932	15 November 1932	Torpedoed west of Celebes on 14 May 1944; struck 10 June 1944

== See also ==
- List of ship classes of the Second World War
