= Japanese destroyer Inazuma (1932) =

Fubuki-class destroyer

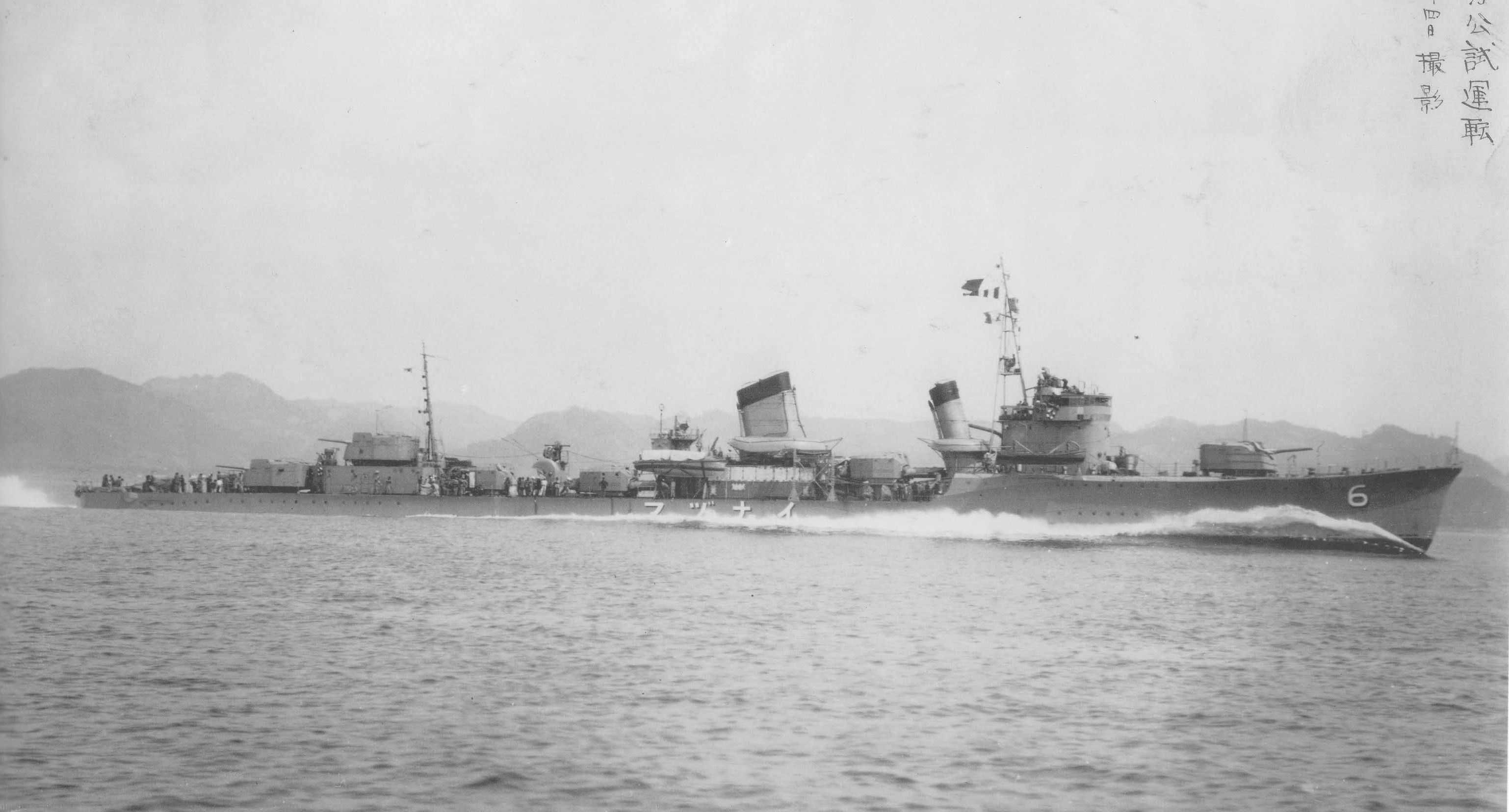
- Inazuma underway on 24 March 1936.

History

Empire of Japan
- Name: Inazuma
- Namesake: 電 ("Lightning")
- Ordered: 1923 Fiscal Year
- Builder: Fujinagata Shipyards
- Laid down: 7 March 1930
- Launched: 25 February 1932
- Commissioned: 15 November 1932
- Stricken: 10 June 1944
- Fate: Torpedoed and sunk on 14 May 1944

General characteristics
- Class & type: Fubuki-class destroyer
- Displacement: 1,750 long tons (1,780 t) standard; 2,050 long tons (2,080 t) re-built
- Length: 111.96 m (367.3 ft) pp; 115.3 m (378 ft) waterline; 118.41 m (388.5 ft) overall
- Beam: 10.4 m (34 ft 1 in)
- Draft: 3.2 m (10 ft 6 in)
- Propulsion: 4 × Kampon type boilers; 2 × Kampon Type Ro geared turbines; 2 × shafts at 50,000 ihp (37,000 kW)
- Speed: 38 knots (44 mph; 70 km/h)
- Range: 5,000 nmi (9,300 km) at 14 knots (26 km/h)
- Complement: 219
- Armament: 6 × Type 3 127 mm 50 caliber naval guns (3×2); up to 22 × Type 96 25 mm AT/AA Guns; up to 10 × 13 mm AA guns; 9 × 610 mm (24 in) torpedo tubes; 36 × depth charges

Service record
- Operations: Battle of Hong Kong; Battle of Sunda Strait; Second Battle of the Java Sea; Aleutian campaign; Solomons campaign

Inazuma (電, "Lightning") was the twenty-fourth (and last) Fubuki-class destroyers, or the fourth (and last) of the Akatsuki class (if that sub-class is considered independently), built for the Imperial Japanese Navy in the inter-war period.

== History ==
Construction of the advanced Fubuki-class destroyers was authorized as part of the Imperial Japanese Navy's expansion program from fiscal 1923, intended to give Japan a qualitative edge with the world's most modern ships. The Fubuki class had performance that was a quantum leap over previous destroyer designs, so much so that they were designated Special Type destroyers (特型, Tokugata). The large size, powerful engines, high speed, large radius of action and unprecedented armament gave these destroyers the firepower similar to many light cruisers in other navies. The Akatsuki sub-class was an improved version of the Fubuki, externally almost identical, but incorporating changes to her propulsion system.

Inazuma, built at the Fujinagata Shipyards in Osaka was the fourth (and last) in the “Type III” improved series of Fubuki destroyers, incorporating a modified gun turret which could elevate her main battery of Type 3 127 mm 50 caliber naval guns to 75° as opposed to the original 40°, thus permitting the guns to be used as dual purpose guns against aircraft. Inazuma was laid down on 7 March 1930, launched on 25 February 1932 and commissioned on 15 November 1932.

== Operational history ==
Soon after completion, on 9 June 1934, Inazuma collided with the destroyer Miyuki on 29 June while on maneuvers off Cheju Island. The collision sank Miyuki and severed the bow of Inazuma, which was towed to Sasebo Naval Arsenal by the heavy cruiser Nachi for extensive repairs.

After repairs were completed, she was assigned to Destroyer Division 6 along with her sister ships, Ikazuchi, Hibiki, and Akatsuki, under the First Fleet.

=== World War II history ===
At the time of the attack on Pearl Harbor, Inazuma was assigned to Destroyer Division 6 of Desron 1 of the IJN 1st Fleet and had deployed from Mako Guard District to provide cover for landing operations in the Invasion of Hong Kong. After assisting the cruiser Isuzu in sinking British gunboats HMS Cicala and HMS Robin, she helped secure Hong Kong Harbor.

After the start of 1942, Inazuma deployed from Hong Kong to Davao, providing cover for landing operations during the Battle of Manado in the Netherlands East Indies. On 20 January, Inazuma collided with the transport Sendai Maru at Davao, and suffered considerable damage, which was later repaired by the repair ship Akashi until further work could be performed at Mako.

On 1 March, Inazuma was involved in the Second Battle of the Java Sea, where she assisted in the sinking of the British destroyer HMS Encounter and the cruiser HMS Exeter, which she hit with two torpedoes. She then rescued 400 odd survivors from Exeter that same day. Two days later, just before midnight on 3 March, she rescued the entire crew from the American destroyer Pope (except one that had died just prior to abandoning ship) who had been in the water for almost 60 hours, having been sunk about two hours after Exeter and Encounter on 1 March. After assisting in operations in the Philippines later in March, she returned to Yokosuka Naval Arsenal for repairs in April.

Inazuma deployed from Ōminato Guard District in support of Admiral Boshirō Hosogaya’s Northern Force in the Aleutians campaign, patrolling waters around Kiska and Attu during June and July and rescuing 36 survivors from the torpedoed destroyer Nenohi. She continued to be assigned to northern patrols in the Chishima islands and Aleutian Islands through the end of August.

From September, Inazuma was reassigned to Kure Naval District, and training exercises in the Inland Sea with new aircraft carriers Junyō and Hiyō. From October, Inazuma escorted these aircraft carriers to Truk and patrolled from Truk to the northern Solomon Islands.

During the First and Second Naval Battle of Guadalcanal from 12–15 November, Inazuma claimed sinking an American cruiser (never confirmed) and assisted in sinking American destroyers USS Benham, USS Walke and USS Preston and damaging USS Gwin.

After the battle, Inazuma was based at Truk and used for numerous "Tokyo Express" high speed transport runs throughout the Solomon Islands.

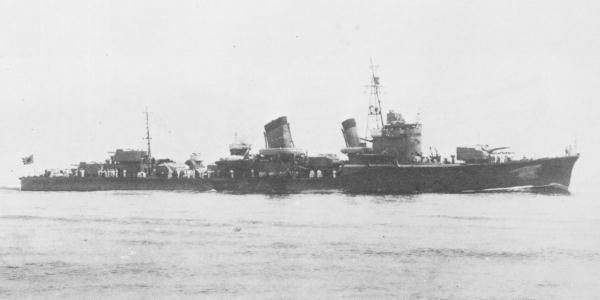
Inazuma in 1937

In mid-January 1943, Inazuma was sent back for maintenance at Kure, escorting Zuikaku, Mutsu and Suzuya. After repairs were completed in February, she was assigned back to Ōminato to resume patrols of northern waters and was at the Battle of the Komandorski Islands in March, albeit as escort for transports and away from the main combat. From April through the end of 1943, Inazuma escorted numerous convoys between Yokosuka and Truk.

In February 1944, Inazuma was reassigned to the Combined Fleet, and from March served primarily as escort for the aircraft carrier Chiyoda on various missions from Palau.

While escorting a tanker convoy from Manila towards Balikpapan on 14 May 1944, Inazuma exploded after being struck by torpedoes launched by USS Bonefish in the Celebes Sea near Tawitawi at position 5°8′N 119°38′E. 161 men were reported dead, including Comdesdiv 6 commander Tomura Kiyoshi (49), the ship commanding officer Lieutenant Commander Tokiwa Teizo (58) and the torpedo officer (Lt Furutani Tomo’o (70). Her sister ship Hibiki rescued the survivors (121 or 125 depending on the source).

On 10 June 1944, Inazuma was removed from the navy list.
