= 12.7 cm/50 Type 3 naval gun =

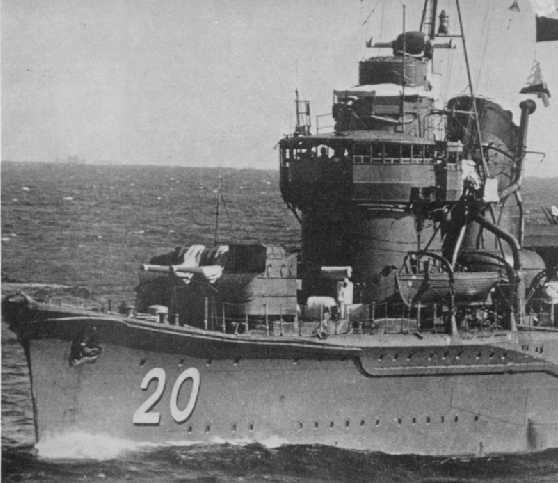
- 12.7 cm/50 Type 3 guns seen in a twin gun Model B turret on Sagiri, 1941
- Type: Naval gun
- Place of origin: Japan

Service history
- In service: 1928–1966
- Used by: Imperial Japanese Navy; Soviet Navy; Republic of China Navy
- Wars: World War II

Production history
- Designed: 1926—1927
- No. built: approximately 700

Specifications
- Mass: 4,205 kilograms (9,270 lb)
- Length: 6.483 metres (21.27 ft)
- Barrel length: 6.265 metres (20.55 ft) (length of bore)
- Shell: separate-loading, bagged charge
- Shell weight: 23 kilograms (51 lb)
- Caliber: 127 millimetres (5.0 in)
- Breech: Welin interrupted screw
- Elevation: depended on mount
- Rate of fire: 5–10 rpm
- Muzzle velocity: 910–915 m/s (2,986–3,002 ft/s)
- Maximum firing range: 18,400 metres (20,100 yd)

The 12.7 cm/50 Type 3 naval gun was a medium-caliber naval gun of the Imperial Japanese Navy used during World War II. It was the standard weapon for Japanese destroyers between 1928 and 1944 (except the Akizuki and Matsu classes). It has been credited as a true dual-purpose gun, but this was more a nominal capability than real, as its bag propellant and need for hand ramming required the gun to be loaded at elevation angles of 5–10°. This dropped its rate of fire to a relatively slow 5–10 rounds per minute, and its training speed of only 6° per second meant that it had a great deal of difficulty engaging enemy aircraft with any chance of success. After the end of World War II, the gun was exported via the two Japanese destroyers ceded as war reparations to the Soviet Union and the Republic of China.

== Description ==
The 50-caliber 12.7 cm (5.0 in) Type 3 gun was of built-up construction, originally with three and later two layers with the usual breech ring and breech bush. It used a Welin interrupted screw breech and powder bags, unusual for guns of that caliber. The shell was fuzed manually on the loading tray before being rammed by hand and could only be loaded at elevations between 5° and 10°. All mounts used pusher-type shell hoists, but the powder bags were passed by hand.

=== Mountings ===
These guns were first used in the twin gun Model A turret on the revolutionary Fubuki-class destroyers. These were the first weatherproof, splinterproof and gas-proof enclosed gun turrets ever mounted on a destroyer. Guns in twin mounts were in individual cradles and could elevate separately. All twin gun mounts weighed approximately 32 tonnes (31 long tons; 35 short tons). All mounts could traverse at 6° per second and could elevate at a rate between 6° and 12° per second although speeds up to 27° per second have been reported.

The twin gun Model A mount was fitted with a 9–12-millimetre-thick (0.35–0.47 in) gun shield. Its guns could depress −5° and elevate to +40°. These mounts were deployed on the first ten Fubuki-class destroyers. The twin gun Model B mount had its elevation increased to 75° and was fitted in the rest of the Fubuki-class as well as the Akatsuki-class destroyers. In order to save weight its gun shield was reduced to 3.2 mm (0.13 in) in thickness, but this proved too thin to withstand heavy seas and was later reinforced. The first four of the Hatsuharu class used the Model B mod 2 mount although how it differed from the earlier Model B mount is unknown. The last two of the Hatsuharu class, the Shiratsuyu, Asashio, and Kagerō-class destroyers used the Model C which reduced its maximum elevation to 55°, but could depress to −7° and was supposedly lighter than earlier models. The Model D used by the Shimakaze and the Yūgumo-class destroyers retained the depression limit of the Model C, but elevation returned to the 75° of the Model B.

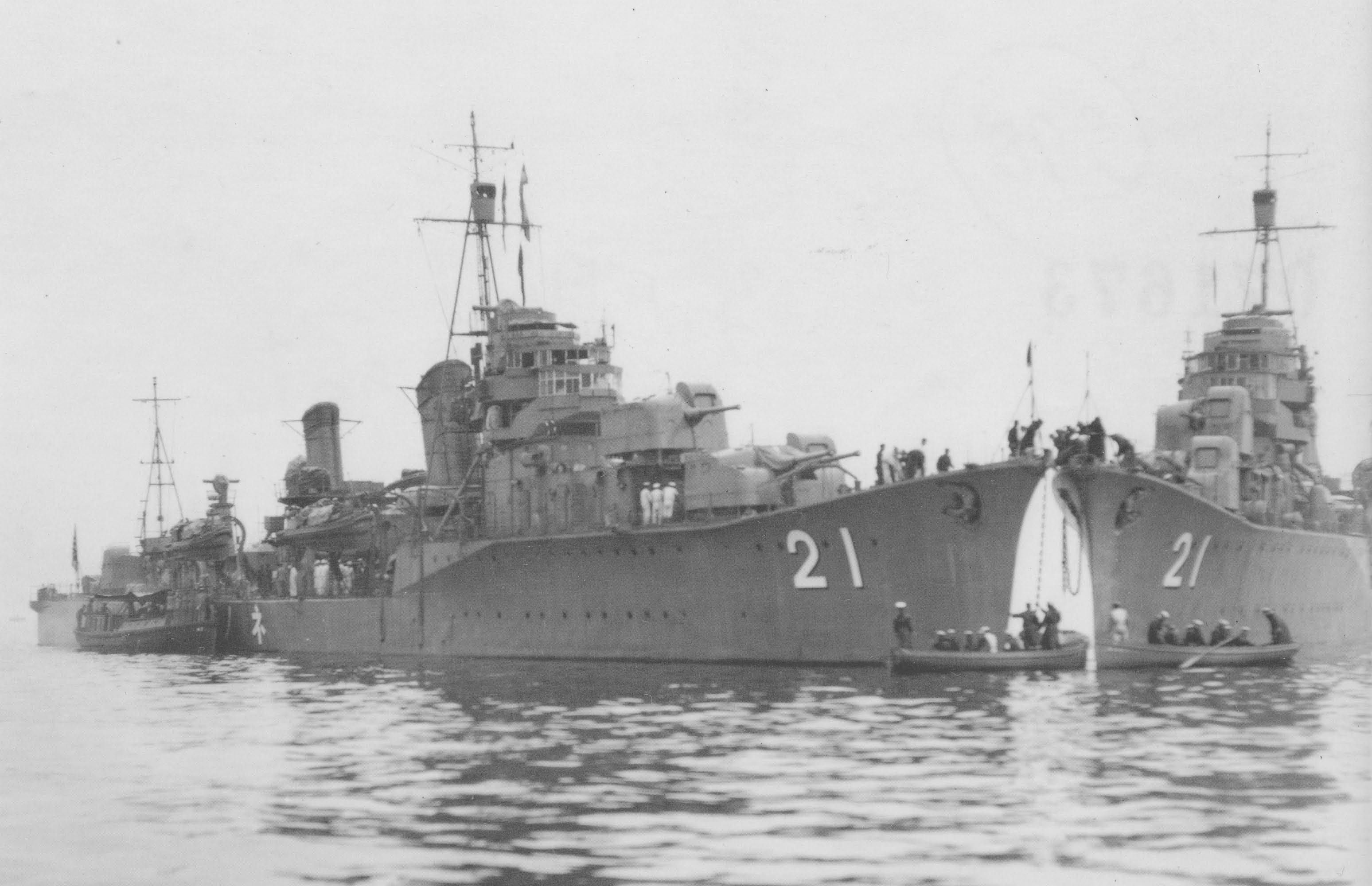
View of the Type A single mount and the Type B twin mount on Nenohi

The Type A single mount could depress −7° and elevate to +75°, but the Type B reduced the maximum elevation to 55°. Both mounts weighed approximately 18.5 tonnes (18.2 long tons; 20.4 short tons). The Type A was fitted on the Hatsuharu class and the Type B on the Shiratsuyu-class destroyers.

=== Ammunition ===
The gun normally fired a 23 kg (51 lb) high-explosive shell, an illumination shell or an incendiary shrapnel round (sankaidan) intended for anti-aircraft use. All of these shells weighed 23 kg (51 lb) and used 7.7 kg (17 lb) of 30 DC propellant. After 1943, a flat-nosed anti-submarine shell also became available. This had a minimum range of 800 metres (870 yd) and a maximum range of 4,300 metres (4,700 yd). A new, heavier, but more streamlined, high-explosive projectile with a range of 23,025 metres (25,180 yd) was under development when the war ended.

Shell name	Weight	Filling Weight	Muzzle velocity
Common Type 0 high-explosive	23 kg (51 lb)	1.88 kg (4.1 lb)	910–915 m/s (2,986–3,002 ft/s)
Common Type 1 high-explosive	23 kg (51 lb)	1.88 kg (4.1 lb)	910–915 m/s (2,986–3,002 ft/s)
Illumination	23 kg (51 lb)	Not applicable	750 m/s (2,500 ft/s)
Anti-submarine	20.9 kg (46 lb)	4 kg (8.8 lb)	250 m/s (820 ft/s)
New Type high-explosive Projectile	27.9 kg (62 lb)	2.2 kg (4.9 lb)	910–915 m/s (2,986–3,002 ft/s)

== See also ==
=== Weapons of comparable role, performance and era ===
- 5"/38-caliber gun: US Navy equivalent dual-purpose gun
- QF 4.5-inch Mk I – V naval gun: British equivalent dual-purpose gun
- 12.7 cm SK C/34 naval gun: German equivalent limited to low-angle fire
- 12.8 cm FlaK 40: Dedicated anti-aircraft, land-based German gun of equal caliber
