= Naval Battle of Guadalcanal =

1942 naval battle in the Pacific Ocean

- Part of the Pacific Theater of World War II
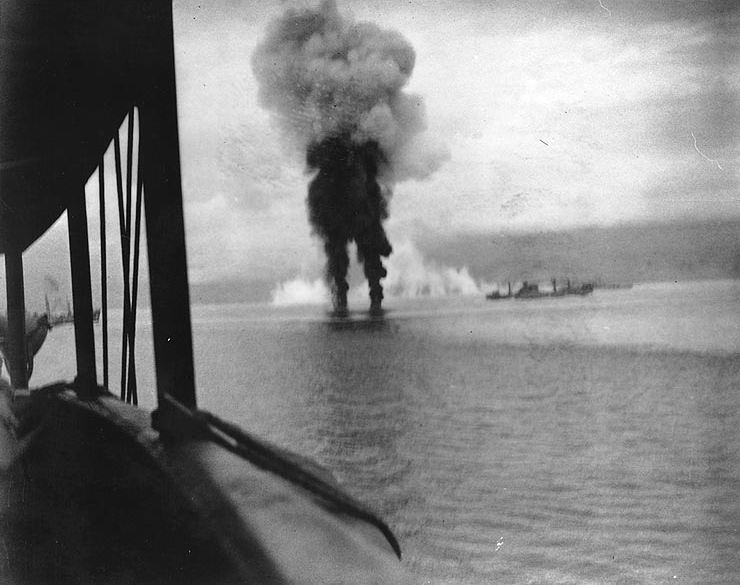
- Smoke rises from two Japanese aircraft shot down off Guadalcanal on 12 November 1942; ship at right is USS Betelgeuse.
Date	12–15 November 1942
Location	Guadalcanal, Solomon Islands 9°11′10″S 159°53′42″E
Result	American victory

Belligerents
United States	Japan

Commanders and leaders
William Halsey, Jr.; Daniel Callaghan †; Norman Scott †; Willis A. Lee	Isoroku Yamamoto; Hiroaki Abe (WIA); Nobutake Kondō; Raizō Tanaka; Kakuji Kakuta; Gunichi Mikawa

Strength
1 fleet carrier; 2 battleships; 2 heavy cruisers; 3 light cruisers; 13 destroyers; First night (13/14 Nov): 2 heavy cruisers; 3 light cruisers; 8 destroyers; Second night (14/15Nov): 2 battleships; 4 destroyers	2 battleships; 6 heavy cruisers; 4 light cruisers; 22 destroyers; 11 transports; First night: 2 battleships; 1 light cruiser; 11 destroyers; 14 Nov: 4 heavy cruisers; 2 light cruisers; 6 destroyers; Second night: 1 battleship; 2 heavy cruisers; 2 light cruisers; 9 destroyers

Casualties and losses
First phase (13/14 Nov): 2 light cruisers sunk; 4 destroyers sunk; 2 heavy cruisers severely damaged; 2 destroyers heavily damaged; Second phase (14/15 Nov): 3 destroyers sunk; 1 battleship moderately damaged; 1 destroyer damaged; Plus (13–15 Nov): 1 destroyer damaged; 36 aircraft; for a total of 1,732 killed	13 Nov: 1 battleship sunk; 2 destroyers sunk; 4 destroyers damaged (one badly); 14 Nov: 1 heavy cruiser sunk; 2 heavy cruisers damaged; 1 light cruiser damaged; 1 destroyer heavily damaged; 7 transports sunk; 15 Nov: 1 battleship sunk; 1 destroyer sunk; 4 transports destroyed (beached first); Plus: 64 aircraft; for a total of 1,900 killed (exclusive of transport losses)

The Naval Battle of Guadalcanal (Note: sometimes referred to as the Third and Fourth Battles of Savo Island, the Battle of the Solomons, The Battle of Friday the 13th, The Night of the Big Guns, or, in Japanese sources, the Third Battle of the Solomon Sea (第三次ソロモン海戦, Dai-san-ji Soromon Kaisen)) took place from 12 to 15 November 1942 and was the decisive engagement in a series of naval battles between Allied (primarily American) and Imperial Japanese forces during the months-long Guadalcanal campaign in the Solomon Islands during World War II. The action consisted of combined air and sea engagements over four days, most near Guadalcanal and all related to a Japanese effort to reinforce land forces on the island. The only two U.S. Navy admirals to be killed in a surface engagement in the war were lost in this battle.

Allied forces landed on Guadalcanal on 7 August 1942 and seized an airfield, later called Henderson Field, that was under construction by the Japanese military. There were several subsequent attempts to recapture the airfield by the Imperial Japanese Army and Navy using reinforcements delivered to Guadalcanal by ship, efforts which ultimately failed. In early November 1942, the Japanese organized a transport convoy to take 7,000 infantry troops and their equipment to Guadalcanal to attempt once again to retake the airfield. Several Japanese warship forces were assigned to bombard Henderson Field with the goal of destroying Allied aircraft that posed a threat to the convoy. Learning of the Japanese reinforcement effort, U.S. forces launched aircraft and warship attacks to defend Henderson Field and prevent the Japanese ground troops from reaching Guadalcanal.

In the resulting battle, both sides lost numerous warships in two extremely destructive nighttime surface engagements. Nevertheless, the U.S. succeeded in turning back attempts by the Japanese to bombard Henderson Field with battleships. Allied aircraft also sank most of the Japanese troop transports and prevented the majority of the Japanese troops and equipment from reaching Guadalcanal. Thus, the battle turned back Japan's last major attempt to dislodge Allied forces from Guadalcanal and nearby Tulagi, resulting in a strategic victory for the U.S. and its allies and deciding the ultimate outcome of the Guadalcanal campaign in their favor. The Japanese decided on the evacuation of Guadalcanal the following month, which they completed by early February 1943.

Guadalcanal was the last major naval battle in the Pacific War for the next one and one half years, until the Battle of the Philippine Sea. It was one of the costliest naval battles of the Second World War in terms of lives lost and most singularly unique in the history of modern naval warfare because of the close-range, almost point-blank, distances among the warships involved.

== Background ==
The six-month Guadalcanal campaign began on 7 August 1942, when Allied (primarily U.S.) forces landed on Guadalcanal, Tulagi, and the Florida Islands in the Solomon Islands, a pre-war colonial possession of Great Britain. The landings were meant to prevent the Japanese using the islands as bases from which to threaten the supply routes between the U.S. and Australia, to secure the islands as starting points for a campaign to neutralize the major Imperial Japanese military base at Rabaul, and to support the Allied New Guinea campaign. The Japanese had occupied Tulagi in May 1942 and began constructing an airfield on Guadalcanal in June 1942.

By nightfall on 8 August, the 11,000 Allied troops secured Tulagi, the nearby small islands, and a Japanese airfield under construction at Lunga Point on Guadalcanal (later renamed Henderson Field). Allied aircraft operating out of Henderson were called the "Cactus Air Force" (CAF) after the Allied code name for Guadalcanal. To protect the airfield, the U.S. Marines established a perimeter defense around Lunga Point. Additional reinforcements over the next two months increased the number of U.S. troops at Lunga Point to more than 20,000 men.

In response, the Japanese Imperial General Headquarters assigned the Imperial Japanese Army's 17th Army, a corps-sized command based at Rabaul and under the command of Lieutenant-General Harukichi Hyakutake, with the task of retaking Guadalcanal. Units of the 17th Army began to arrive on Guadalcanal on 19 August to drive Allied forces from the island.

Because of the threat posed by CAF aircraft based at Henderson Field, the Japanese were unable to use large, slow transport ships to deliver troops and supplies to the island. Instead, they used warships based at Rabaul and the Shortland Islands. The Japanese warships—mainly light cruisers or destroyers from the Eighth Fleet under the command of Vice Admiral Gunichi Mikawa—were usually able to make the round trip down "The Slot" to Guadalcanal and back in a single night, thereby minimizing their exposure to air attack. Delivering the troops in this manner prevented most of the soldiers' heavy equipment and supplies—such as heavy artillery, vehicles, and much food and ammunition—from being carried to Guadalcanal with them. These high-speed warship runs to Guadalcanal occurred throughout the campaign and came to be known as the "Tokyo Express" by Allied forces and "Rat Transportation" by the Japanese.

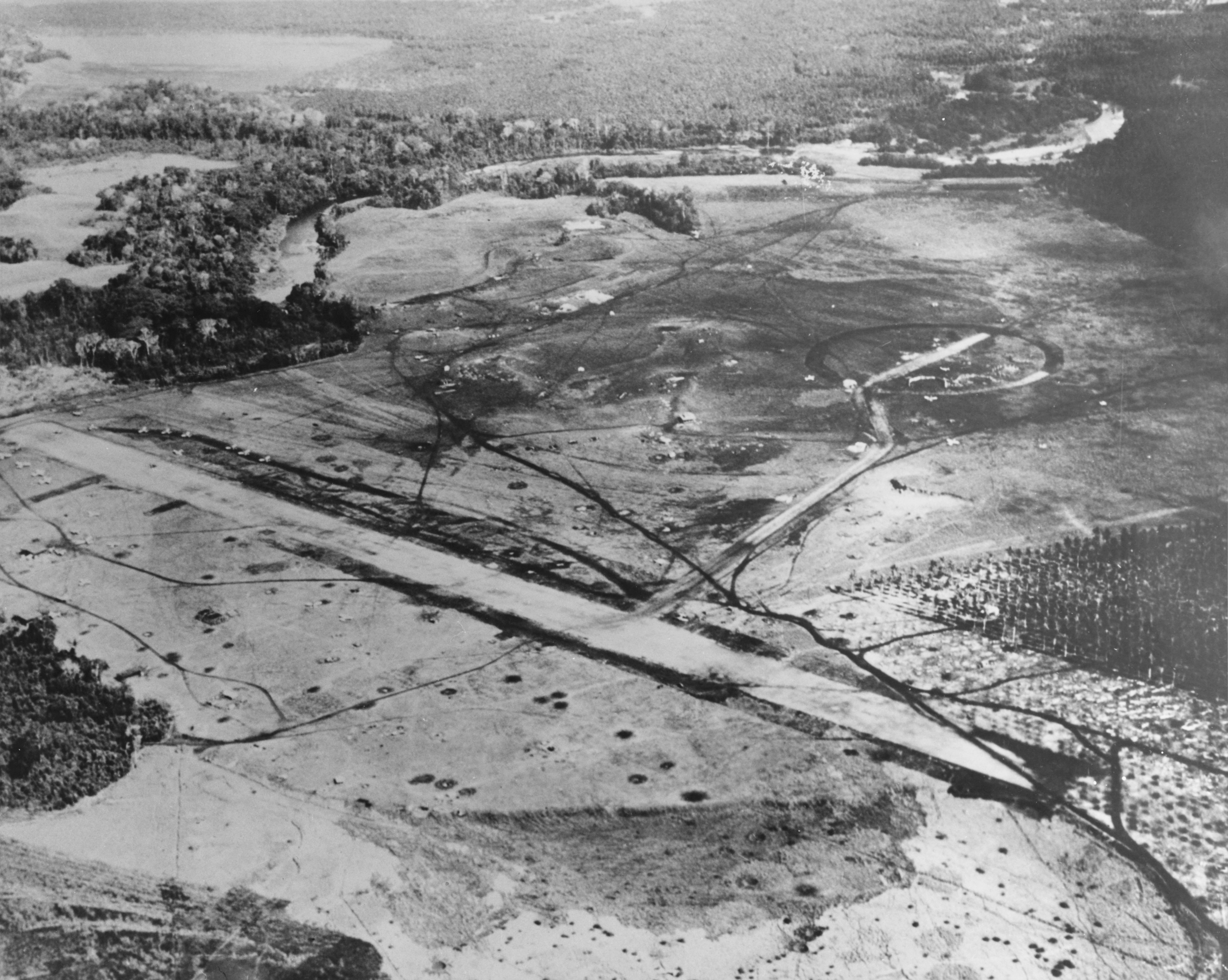
Aerial view of Henderson Field on Guadalcanal, late August 1942. The view looks northwest with the Lunga River and Lunga Point at the top of the image.

The first Japanese attempt to recapture Henderson Field failed when a 917-man force was defeated on 21 August in the Battle of the Tenaru. The next attempt took place from 12 to 14 September, ending in the defeat of the 6,000 men under the command of Major General Kiyotake Kawaguchi at the Battle of Edson's Ridge.

In October, the Japanese again tried to recapture Henderson Field by delivering 15,000 more men—mainly from the Army's 2nd Infantry Division—to Guadalcanal. In addition to delivering the troops and their equipment by Tokyo Express runs, the Japanese successfully pushed through one large convoy of slower transport ships. Enabling the approach of the transport convoy was a nighttime bombardment of Henderson Field by two battleships on 14 October that heavily damaged the airfield's runways, destroyed half of the CAF's aircraft, and burned most of the available aviation fuel. In spite of the damage, Henderson personnel were able to restore the two runways to service, and replacement aircraft and fuel were delivered, gradually restoring the CAF to its prebombardment level over the next few weeks.

The next Imperial attempt to retake the island with the newly arrived troops occurred from 20 to 26 October and was defeated with heavy losses in the Battle for Henderson Field. At the same time, Admiral Isoroku Yamamoto (the commander of the Japanese Combined Fleet) engaged U.S. naval forces in the Battle of the Santa Cruz Islands, which resulted in a tactical victory for the Japanese. However, the Americans won a strategic victory as the Japanese navy failed in its objectives and the Japanese carriers were forced to retreat because of losses to carrier aircraft and aircrewmen. Thereafter, Yamamoto's ships returned to their main bases at Truk in Micronesia, where he had his headquarters, and Rabaul while three carriers returned to Japan for repairs and refitting.

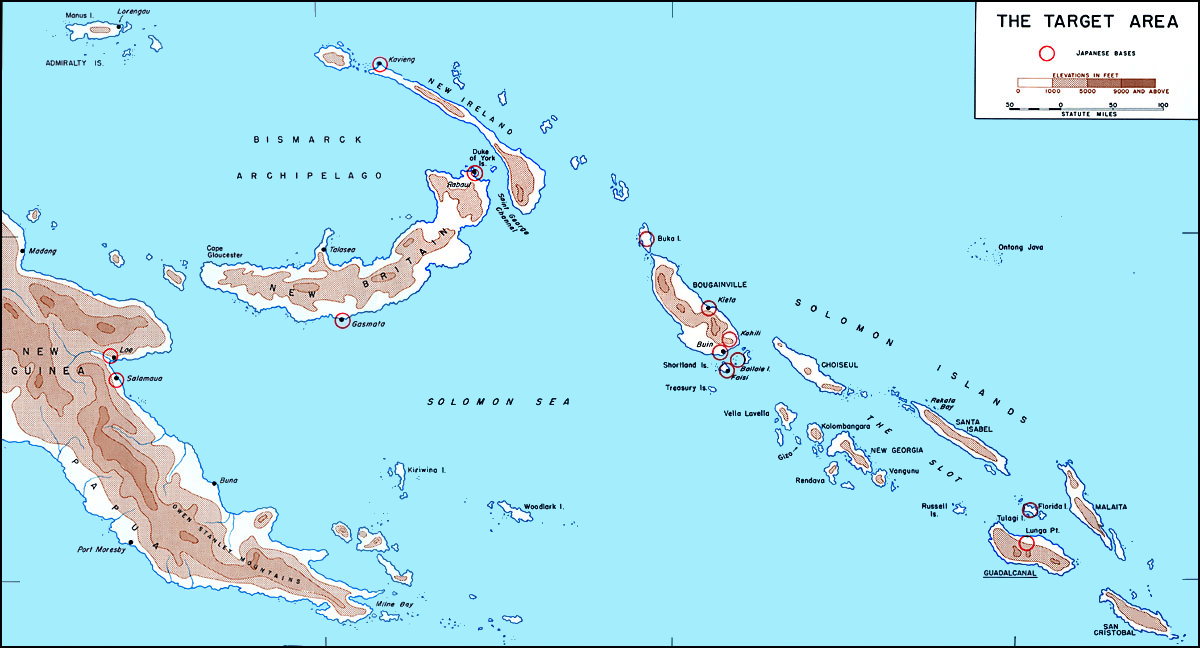
The Solomon Islands. "The Slot" (New Georgia Sound) runs down the center of the islands, from Bougainville and the Shortlands (center) to Guadalcanal (lower right).

The Japanese Army planned another attack on Guadalcanal in November 1942, but further reinforcements were needed before the operation could proceed. The Army requested assistance from Yamamoto to deliver the needed reinforcements to the island and to support their planned offensive on the Allied forces guarding Henderson Field. Yamamoto provided 11 large transport ships to carry 7,000 army troops from the 38th Infantry Division, their ammunition, food, and heavy equipment from Rabaul to Guadalcanal. He also sent a warship support force from Truk on 9 November which included the battleships Hiei and Kirishima. Equipped with special fragmentation shells, they were to bombard Henderson Field on the night of 12–13 November and destroy it and the aircraft stationed there in order to allow the slow, heavy transports to reach Guadalcanal and unload safely the next day. The warship force was commanded from Hiei by recently promoted Vice Admiral Hiroaki Abe.

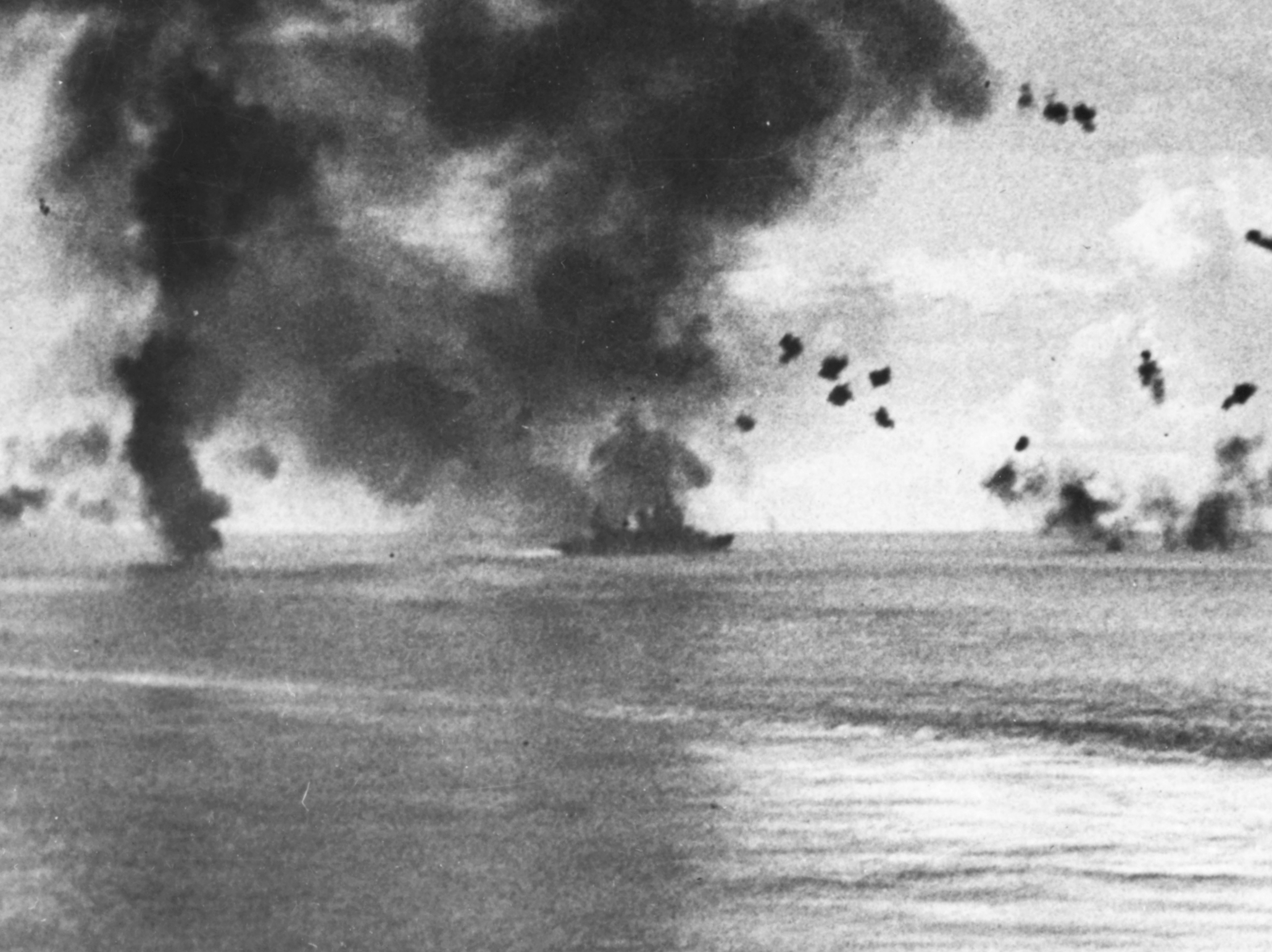
The aftermath of the "Betty" medium bomber crashing into the heavy cruiser San Francisco on 12 November 1942

Because of the constant threat posed by Japanese aircraft and warships, it was difficult for Allied forces to resupply their forces on Guadalcanal, which often came under attack from Imperial land and sea forces in the area. In early November 1942, Allied intelligence learned that the Japanese were preparing again to try to retake Henderson Field. Therefore, the U.S. sent Task Force 67 (TF 67)—a large reinforcement and re-supply convoy, split into two groups and commanded by Rear Admiral Richmond K. Turner—to Guadalcanal on 11 November. The supply ships were protected by two task groups—commanded by Rear Admirals Daniel J. Callaghan and Norman Scott—and aircraft from Henderson Field. The transport ships were attacked several times on 11 and 12 November near Guadalcanal by Japanese aircraft based at Buin, but most were unloaded without serious damage. Twelve Japanese aircraft were shot down by anti-aircraft fire from the U.S. ships or by fighter aircraft flying from Henderson Field. Callaghan's flagship, San Francisco, was heavily damaged during this air raid when a large twin-engined Japanese "Betty" medium bomber, which was in flames from anti-aircraft fire, crashed into the backup conning tower (Battle II) of San Francisco. 24 men were killed and 45 were wounded, including the heavily wounded executive officer, Commander Mark H. Crouter, who had to abandon his post and was recovering in his quarters and killed during the later night surface action. Survivors of San Francisco said that the heavy damage, which included damage to radar and fire control equipment stationed at the backup conning tower, and the loss of so many officers and men greatly hindered their ability to command and perform optimally during the night battle. The destroyer Buchanan was also heavily damaged in the air attack. Due to the low-flying Japanese torpedo bombers that forced American sailors to fire their anti-aircraft weapons in the direction of friendly ships Buchanan was hit by a 5-inch shell from a U.S. ship that heavily damaged her after stack and also completely disabled her torpedo tubes. The friendly fire killed five crewmen and wounded seven on Buchanan and forced her to retire from the area to undergo major repairs that lasted three months. A Japanese bomber's tail gunner also caused minor damage on her with his machine gun, wounding one more sailor. This hurt Callaghan's forces because Buchanan was the destroyer that was able to successfully fire torpedoes that permanently disabled and sank the heavy cruiser Furutaka at the Battle of Cape Esperance, the first American sinking of a large Japanese warship due to surface ships.

== First Naval Battle of Guadalcanal, 13 November ==
=== Prelude ===
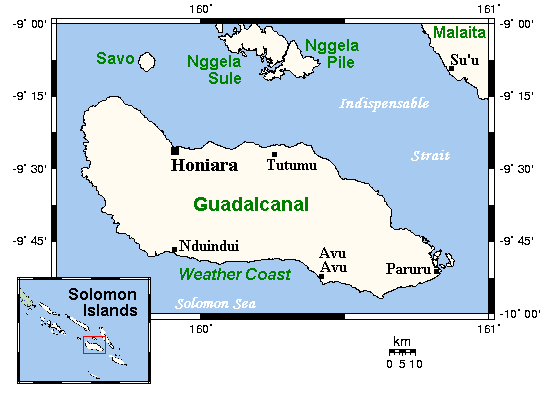
Guadalcanal locator map and close up

Abe's warship force assembled 70 nmi (81 mi; 130 km) north of Indispensable Strait and proceeded towards Guadalcanal on 12 November with an estimated arrival time for the warships of early morning of 13 November. The convoy of slower transport ships and 12 escorting destroyers, under the command of Raizō Tanaka, began its run down The Slot from the Shortlands with an estimated arrival time at Guadalcanal during the night of 13 November.

Abe's force consisted of: (Note: Casualty ships are denoted by: d, damaged; D, crippled; S, sunk; s, sunk soon after.)

(d = damaged; D = crippled; S = sunk; s = sunk soon after)

2 fast battleships

2 Kongo-class (8 × 14-in. main battery): Hiei (Ds), Kirishima (d)

1 light cruiser

Nagara-class (7 × 5.5-in. main battery): Nagara (d)

11 destroyers

2 Kagero-class (6 × 5-in. main battery): Amatsukaze (D), Yukikaze
1 Asashio-class (6 × 5-in. main battery): Asagumo
4 Shiratsuyu-class (5 × 5-in. main battery): Samidare,(d) Murasame (d), Harusame, Yūdachi (Ds)
3 Akatsuki-class (6 × 5-in. main battery): Ikazuchi (d), Inazuma, Akatsuki (S)
1 Akizuki-class (8 × 3.9-in. main battery): Teruzuki

Admiral Abe commanded from Hiei.

Three more destroyers (Shigure, Shiratsuyu, and Yūgure) would provide a rear guard in the Russell Islands during Abe's foray into the waters of Savo Sound around and near Savo Island off the north coast of Guadalcanal that would soon be nicknamed "Ironbottom Sound" as a result of the numerous ships sunk in this succession of battles and skirmishes. U.S. reconnaissance aircraft spotted the approach of the Japanese ships and passed a warning to the Allied command. Thus warned, Turner detached all usable combat ships to protect the troops ashore from the expected Japanese naval attack and troop landing and ordered the supply ships at Guadalcanal to depart by the early evening of 12 November. Callaghan was a few days senior to the more experienced Scott and therefore was placed in overall command.

Callaghan prepared his force to meet the Japanese that night in the sound. His force consisted of:

2 heavy cruisers

1 New Orleans-class (9 × 8-in. main battery): San Francisco (D)
1 Portland-class (9 × 8-in. main battery): Portland (d)

1 light cruiser

1 Brooklyn-class (15 × 6-in. rapid fire main battery): Helena (d)

2 anti-aircraft light cruisers

2 Atlanta-class (16 × 5-in. dual purpose main battery): Atlanta (Ds), Juneau (Ds)

8 destroyers

2 Fletcher-class (5 × 5-in. dual purpose main battery): Fletcher, O'Bannon (d)
2 Gleaves-class (5 × 5-in. dual purpose main battery): Aaron Ward (D), Monssen (S)
2 Benson-class (4 × 5-in. dual purpose main battery): Barton (S), Laffey (S)
1 Benham-class (4 × 5-in. main battery): Sterett (D)
1 Mahan-class (5 × 5-in. main battery): Cushing (S)

Admiral Callaghan commanded from San Francisco.

During their approach to Guadalcanal, the Japanese force passed through a large and intense rain squall which, along with a complex formation plus some confusing orders from Abe, split the formation into several groups. The U.S. force steamed in a single column in Ironbottom Sound, with destroyers in the lead and rear of the column, and the cruisers in the center. Five ships had the new, far-superior SG radar, but Callaghan's deployment put none of them in the forward part of the column, nor did he choose one for his flagship. Callaghan did not issue a battle plan to his ship commanders.

=== Action ===
==== Confused approach ====
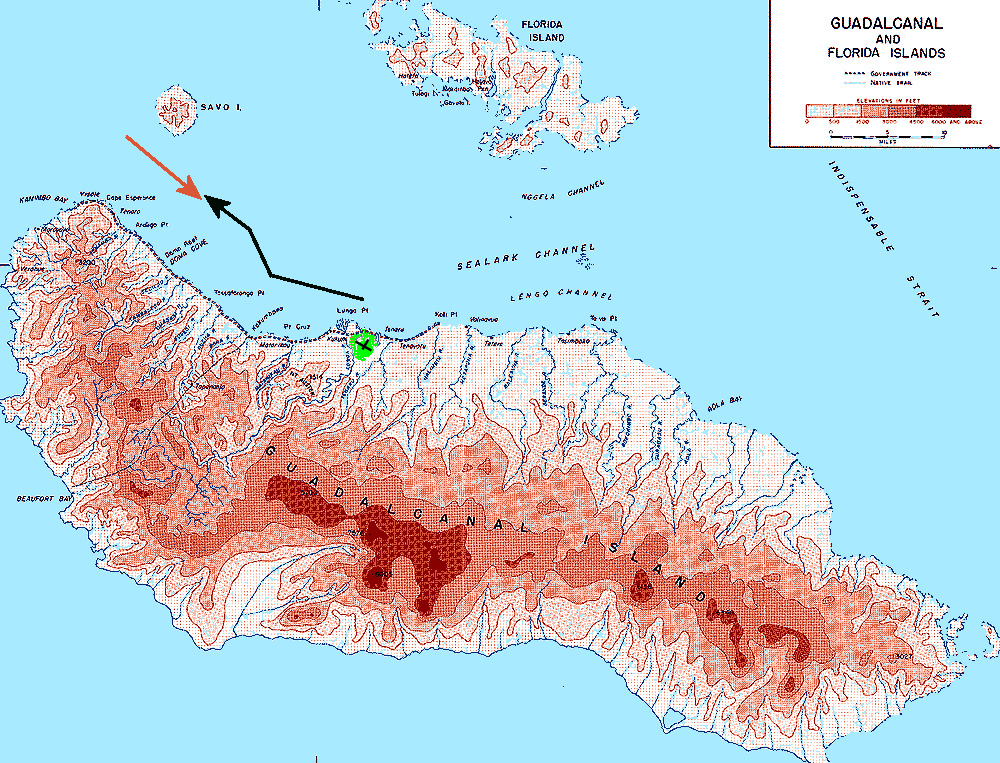
Approximate routes of Japanese force under Abe (red line) and U.S. force under Callaghan (black line) as they head towards each other early on 13 November in Ironbottom Sound between Savo Island, Cape Esperance, and Lunga Point on Guadalcanal. The green area near Lunga Point on Guadalcanal marks the location of Henderson Field.

At about 01:25 on 13 November, in near-complete darkness due to the bad weather and dark moon, the ships of the Imperial Japanese force entered the sound between Savo Island and Guadalcanal and prepared to bombard Henderson Field with the special ammunition loaded for the purpose. The ships arrived from an unexpected direction, coming not down the Slot but from the west side of Savo Island, thus entering the sound from the northwest rather than the north. Unlike their American counterparts, the Japanese sailors had drilled and practiced night fighting extensively, conducting frequent live-fire night gunnery drills and exercises, which helped them in the pending encounter, as well as in several other fleet actions off Guadalcanal in the months to come.

Several of the U.S. ships detected the approaching Japanese on radar, beginning at about 01:24, but had trouble communicating the information to Callaghan because of problems with radio equipment, lack of discipline regarding communications procedures, and general inexperience in operating as a cohesive naval unit. Messages were sent and received but did not reach the commander in time to be processed and used. With his limited understanding of the new technology, Callaghan wasted further time trying to reconcile the range and bearing information reported by radar with his limited sight picture. The radar operator was reporting on vessels that were not in sight, while Callaghan was trying to coordinate the battle visually from the bridge. Due to the earlier de facto kamikaze strike on the after superstructure of San Francisco, Callaghan, and skipper Captain Cassin Young, who had just begun his first ever command of a cruiser four days earlier on 9 November, had to work with a new acting executive officer, who was actually the damage control commanding officer, who had been stationed at his new heavily damaged backup command post for less than twelve hours, where the radar and fire control were inoperable. Post-battle analysis of this and other surface actions would lead directly to the introduction of the modern combat information center (CIC), where incoming information could be quickly processed and coordinated, early in 1943.

Several minutes after initial radar contact the two forces sighted each other at about the same time, but both Abe and Callaghan hesitated ordering their ships into action. Abe was apparently surprised by the proximity of the U.S. ships, and with decks stacked with San Shiki special bombardment (rather than armor penetrating) munitions, he was momentarily uncertain if he should withdraw to give his battleships time to rearm, or continue onward. He decided to continue onward. Callaghan apparently intended to attempt to cross the T of the Japanese, as Scott had done at Cape Esperance, but—confused by the incomplete information he was receiving, plus the fact that the Japanese formation consisted of several scattered groups—he gave several confusing orders on ship movements and delayed too long in acting.

The U.S. ship formation began to fall apart, apparently further delaying Callaghan's order to commence firing as he first tried to ascertain and align his ships' positions. Meanwhile, the two forces' formations began to overlap as individual ship commanders on both sides anxiously awaited permission to open fire.

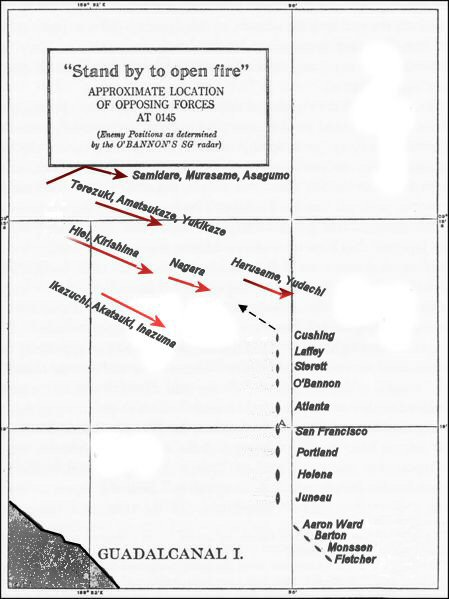
Position of Japanese and U.S. ships at 01:45 on 13 November

==== Akatsuki and Atlanta receive the opening blows ====
At 01:48, Akatsuki and Hiei turned on large searchlights, apparently without being ordered to do so by Abe, and illuminated Atlanta only 3,000 yd (2,700 m) away—almost point-blank range for the battleship's main guns. Several ships on both sides spontaneously began firing, and the formations of the two adversaries quickly disintegrated. Realizing that his force was almost surrounded by Japanese ships, Callaghan issued the confusing order, "Odd ships fire to starboard, even ships fire to port," though no pre-battle planning had assigned any such identity numbers to reference and the ships were no longer in coherent formation. Most of the remaining U.S. ships then opened fire although several had to quickly change their targets to attempt to comply with Callaghan's order. As the ships from the two sides intermingled, they battled each other in an utterly confused and chaotic short-range mêlée in which superior Japanese optic sights and well-practiced night battle drill proved deadly effective. Indeed, the battle was so close quarters that in the opening stages, the lead American destroyer, USS Cushing, almost collided with the destroyers Yūdachi and Harusame, with both sides turning to avoid each other. An officer on Monssen likened it afterwards to "a barroom brawl after the lights had been shot out".

At least six of the U.S. ships—including Laffey, O'Bannon, Atlanta, San Francisco, Portland, and Helena—fired at Akatsuki, which had drawn attention to herself with her illuminated searchlight. Akatsuki quickly responded with gunfire, scoring 5-inch (127 mm) shell hits that disabled Atlanta's port torpedo tubes right as they were about to be fired. However, Akatsuki received far more damage than she inflicted. Heavy caliber shells hit Akatsuki amidships and aft which destroyed the starboard engine room and set the destroyer on fire. Another wave of shell hits blasted the port engine room and crippled the steering gear as Akatsuki listed to port and tipped by the stern. Akatsuki was left disabled, drifting, and ablaze before she rapidly capsized and sank at 1:55 with 223 killed, including Captain of destroyer division 6 Yamada Yusuke and the destroyer's commander Takasuka Osamu. Only 18 survivors were rescued or captured by American forces.

Perhaps because she was the lead cruiser in the U.S. formation, Atlanta was immediately targeted by Hiei, with up to 13 6-inch (152mm) hits setting the cruiser on fire and disabling her aft guns. Simultaneously Ikazuchi and Inazuma swerved to firing range, Ikazuchi evading the burning wreck of Akatsuki, and each fired six torpedoes. Atlanta took some 35 shell hits before the fatal blow was delivered as two of Ikazuchi's torpedoes struck home. One was a dud, but the other exploded and cut all power to Atlanta's engineering spaces. The disabled cruiser drifted into the line of fire of San Francisco, which accidentally fired on her, hitting her with nineteen 8-inch (203 mm) shells. Although the shells passed through the superstructure without exploding and failed to significantly damage the ship, they did succeed in killing rear admiral Norman Scott and most of the ship's command staff. Without power and unable to fire her guns, Atlanta drifted out of control and out of the battle as the Japanese ships passed her by, leading to her eventual scuttling.

Cushing, having recovered from her near collision, fired her guns at Amatsukaze and attempted to sink her. However, her shots were badly aimed and failed to damage their target. In turn, Cushing was ambushed by Nagara, Yukikaze, and Harusame at 1:50, who mistook her for an enemy cruiser. They opened fire a mere 3,000 yards. Cushing attempted to turn attention to her attackers, but 5.5-inch (14 cm) and 5-inch (127 mm) shell hits quickly cut all power lines, destroyed all electrical and engine power, and disabled her guns, leaving her dead in the water and nearly defenseless. Blasted by over 20 shell hits mostly amidships and lit up by a massive fire in just two minutes, Cushing could only respond with machine gunfire, which managed to kill a sailor on Yukikaze's deck but otherwise caused only cosmetic damage. As the mangled Cushing drifted away from the battle, her sailors watched as the massive Hiei sailed right past them. In turn, after helping to sink Atlanta, Ikazuchi was fired on by San Francisco and hit by two or three 8-inch (203 mm) shells to her bow, starting a small fire and disabling her forward turret.

==== Attention shifts to Hiei, San Francisco is mauled ====
Hiei, with her nine lit searchlights, huge size, and course taking her directly through the U.S. formation, became the focus of gunfire from many of the U.S. ships. Portland fired on her and scored several hits with her main guns, while the back flotilla of US destroyers, Aaron Ward, Barton, Monssen, and Fletcher quickly closed the range to attack Hiei. Of the frontal destroyers, Sterett attacked Nagara, hitting her with one 5-inch (127 mm) shell, killing six men and causing minor damage while O'Bannon was the first destroyer to attack Hiei, hitting her with several 5-inch (127 mm) shells which ignited fires and two torpedoes that failed to explode. In exchange, Sterett was hit by three 14-inch (356 mm) shells from Hiei which destroyed her radar and damaged her steering gear.

The destroyer Laffey evaded the burning Cushing and ran into a rain squall, and several minutes later discovered Hiei so close that they missed colliding by 20 ft (6 m), only avoiding the collision by accelerating. Hiei was unable to depress her main or secondary batteries low enough to hit Laffey, but Laffey was able to rake the Japanese battleship with 5 in (127.0 mm) shells and machine gun fire, causing heavy damage to the superstructure and bridge, wounding Abe and killing his chief of staff, Captain Masakane Suzuki, alongside injuring and killing many others on the bridge. Abe was thus limited in his ability to direct his ships for the rest of the battle. Sterett then located Hiei and hit her several more times, helping to light Hiei on fire.

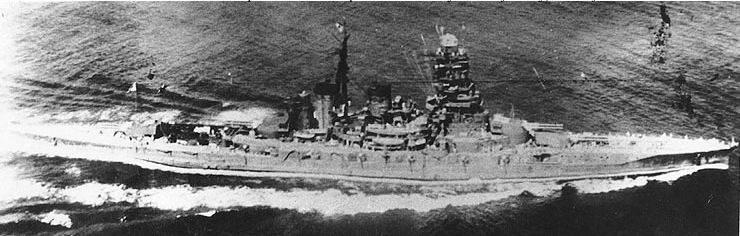
Battleship Hiei in 1942

Unable to fire her main or secondary batteries at the three destroyers causing her so much trouble, Hiei instead concentrated on San Francisco, which was passing by only 2,500 yd (2,300 m) away. Along with Kirishima, Inazuma, and Ikazuchi, the four ships made repeated hits on San Francisco, disabling her steering control and killing Callaghan, Captain Cassin Young, and most of the bridge staff. The first few salvos from Hiei and Kirishima consisted of the special fragmentation bombardment shells, which caused less damage to the interior of San Francisco than armor-piercing shells would have done; this may have saved her from being sunk outright. Not expecting a ship-to-ship confrontation, it took the crews of the two Japanese battleships several minutes to switch to armor-piercing ammunition, and San Francisco, almost helpless to defend herself, managed to momentarily sail clear of the melee. In exchange, San Francisco hit Hiei with at least seventeen 8-inch (203 mm) shells during the brawl, one or two of which landed in Hiei's steering gear room, flooding it with water, shorting out her power steering generators, and severely inhibiting Hiei's steering capability. Helena followed San Francisco to try to protect her from further harm, in the process being hit by five 6-inch (152 mm) shells from Kirishima which caused minor damage, killing one sailor.

==== Chaotic melee, IJN prevails ====
Three of the U.S. destroyers met a sudden demise just before 2:00. Amatsukaze finally cleared the range into the battle, and immediately star shells fired from Nagara illuminated several destroyers peppering Hiei with gunfire. Commander Tameichi Hara ordered the destroyer to close to 3,000 yards, and upon the crew delivering this order Amatsukaze let out eight torpedoes at the enemy ships. Commander Hara had trained heavily as a torpedo warfare expert, and his knowledge paid off. Aaron Ward and Monssen barely avoided being torpedoed, maneuvering just in time. The destroyer Barton was not as lucky; she was forced to slow down to avoid colliding with Aaron Ward, and before she could pick up speed, two of Amatsukaze's torpedoes slammed amidships, which tore Barton in half and sank her in a tremendous explosion of flames and steam.

Cushing was still mangled and disabled from the earlier gunfire damage from Nagara, Yukikaze, and Harusame but damage control was just starting to settle a few fires. Teruzuki located the destroyer and pounced on the crippled Cushing. Nearly a dozen 3.9-inch (12 cm) hits reset any damage control efforts before starting more fires which helped to engulfed the ship, delivering the coup de grâce which led to the crew abandoning Cushing at 3:15 and leaving her to sink over several hours with the loss of at least 70 men.

Laffey, having escaped her encounter with Hiei, was suddenly located by Nagara and Yukikaze and illuminated by star shells. Immediately afterwards, two 14-inch (356 mm) shells from Hiei took revenge and hit the bridge amidships superstructure, before three 5-inch (127 mm) shells from Yukikaze disabled Laffey's 5-inch (127 mm) turret no 2. Laffey responded with her remaining three guns, but before landing a hit, one of Yukikaze's torpedoes landed the crippling blow, blowing off Laffey's stern, breaking her keel, destroying electrical power, and starting a gigantic fire. With flooding and fires quickly overwhelming damage control efforts, the abandon ship order was issued, and as Laffey was being abandoned, the fire caused by Yukikaze's torpedo hit ignited her turret 4 magazines and sank Laffey nearly instantly in a tremendous explosion, killing 59 men.

O'Bannon while turning away from Hiei noticed the massive explosion caused by Laffey's sinking and swerved to avoid colliding with her wreck, with O'Bannon's crew throwing some 50 lifejackets overboard to the surviving men in the water. As this happened, Yukikaze noticed O'Bannon and fired with her 5-inch (127 mm) guns. O'Bannon turned away, and while no hits were landed a near miss detonated underneath the keel and temporarily disrupted O'Bannon's lighting and power.

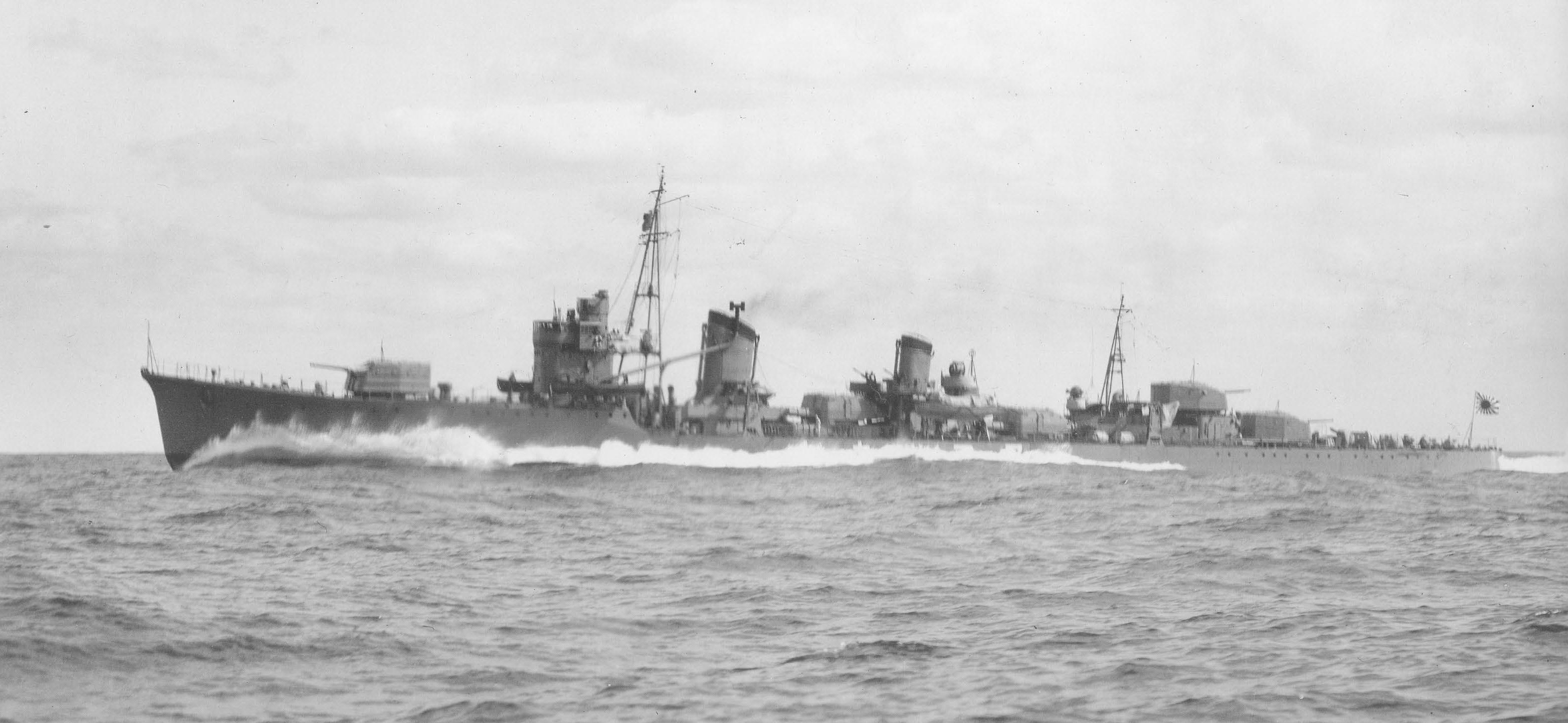
Amatsukaze, which sank Barton and helped to sink Juneau. Her commander, Tameichi Hara, became a key primary witness to the battle.

Portland was still firing on Hiei when she was hit by a torpedo from Inazuma or Ikazuchi which blew a 60-foot (18 m) hole in the stern, jamming her rudder in a 5-degree turn to port and disabling her aft 8-inch (203 mm) gun turret. After completing her first loop, she was able to fire four salvos at Hiei but otherwise took little further part in the battle, while in turn Hiei hit Portland with two 14-inch (356 mm) shells that exploded upon impact with the belt.

Yūdachi meanwhile was caught by the light cruiser Juneau and fired all eight torpedoes, but none hit. This put Yūdachi in a bad spot as she was forced to respond with only gunfire, but luckily Amatsukaze, having just reloaded her torpedoes after sinking Barton, noticed her under fire and launched four torpedoes at the enemy cruiser. One of these torpedoes hit Juneau to the port side, cutting her speed to 13 knots, breaking her keel, and disabling electrical power, knocking the crippled Juneau out of the engagement.

Immediately afterwards, Amatsukaze nearly collided with the retreating San Francisco, and initially Commander Hara didn't recognize the cruiser as an enemy warship due to the sheer number of deformities inflicted on her by Hiei and Kirishima's gunfire. To verify she was not friendly, he ordered searchlights be turned on. At just a few hundred yards away, Amatsukaze opened fire with her 5-inch (127 mm) guns, immediately scoring hits to San Francisco's bridge, before a shell destroyed one of San Francisco's remaining port 5-inch (127 mm) secondary guns and disabled the rest with shrapnel damage, killing several sailors. Amatsukaze then fired the last of her torpedoes, but due to how close they were, the torpedoes failed to arm and did not explode. However, Amatsukaze's searchlights were not turned off quickly enough, allowing Helena to notice her; Helena ambushed Amatsukaze and hit her with several 6-inch (152 mm) shells, disabling her guns and steering wheel, cutting her speed to 20 knots, and killing 43 crew. However, Asagumo, Murasame, and Samidare finally joined the battle and intervened, taking up Helena's attention as Amatsukaze withdrew from the battle. Helena hit Samidare with a shell that exploded in her bow and hit Murasame with a shell that knocked out her forward boiler, and in return Murasame unleashed a spread of 7 torpedoes before the three destroyers retreated. Murasame claimed to torpedo and sink Helena, which turned out to be a false claim as she survived without torpedo damage.

Monssen avoided the wreck of Barton and steamed onward looking for targets. She noticed what she thought were friendly ships signaling her and attempted to reply. In fact, the lights were from star shells, and with Monssen's position visible, Asagumo, Murasame, and Samidare blasted Monssen to starboard, while Hiei flanked Monssen to port, before Asagumo fired a spread of 8 torpedoes at the destroyer. In under two minutes, the Japanese ships hit Monssen some 39 times, including three 14-inch (356 mm) shells from Hiei's main guns, which one by one shot away her 5-inch (127 mm) guns, silenced her engines and boilers, disabled her rudder, destroyed her bridge, fire control, and rangefinder, and set the destroyer ablaze, leaving Monssen a floating wreck which was abandoned by her crew 20 minutes later and sank after daybreak with the loss of 150 men.

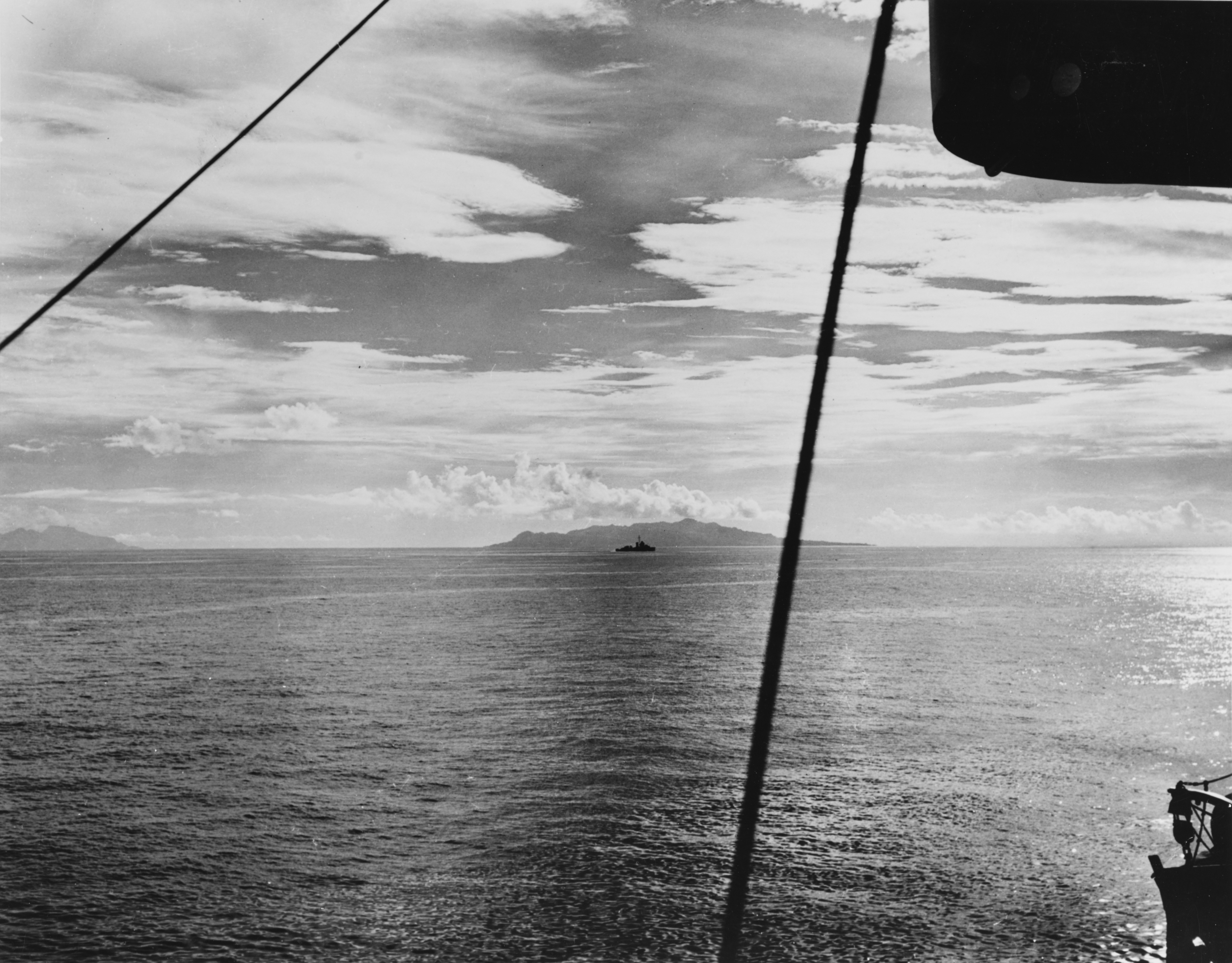
Ironbottom Sound. The majority of the warship surface battle of 13 November took place in the area between Savo Island (center) and Guadalcanal (left).

Aaron Ward and Sterett, independently searching for targets, both sighted Yūdachi, which appeared unaware of the approach of the two U.S. destroyers. Both U.S. ships hit Yūdachi simultaneously with gunfire and torpedoes, destroying her boilers and leaving her dead in the water, resulting in Yūdachi being abandoned. The ship did not sink right away, and stayed afloat after a failed scuttling attempt. Continuing on her way, Sterett was suddenly ambushed by Yukikaze, which hit Sterett with eight 5-inch (127 mm) shells. Sterett's torpedoes and aft guns were destroyed, and she was set on fire, but miraculously all damage was above the waterline, thus she did not sink and managed to limp away. Aaron Ward wound up in a one-on-one duel with Kirishima, which the destroyer lost with heavy damage, taking nine hits. She tried to retire from the battle area to the east but soon stopped dead in the water because the engines were damaged. In the final stages of the battle, intense flooding and fires inflicted near the very beginning of the engagement had finally overwhelmed all damage control on the still drifting and defenseless Cushing, and at 2:30 the destroyer was finally abandoned by her crew and left to sink several hours later.

Robert Leckie, a Marine private on Guadalcanal, described the battle:

The star shells rose, terrible and red. Giant tracers flashed across the night in orange arches. ... the sea seemed a sheet of polished obsidian on which the warships seemed to have been dropped and were immobilized, centered amid concentric circles like shock waves that form around a stone dropped in mud.

Ira Wolfert, an American war correspondent, was with the Marines on shore and wrote of the engagement:

The action was illuminated in brief, blinding flashes by Jap searchlights which were shot out as soon as they were turned on, by muzzle flashes from big guns, by fantastic streams of tracers, and by huge orange-colored explosions as two Jap destroyers and one of our destroyers blew up... From the beach it resembled a door to hell opening and closing ... over and over.

After nearly 40 minutes of brutal close-quarters fighting, the two sides broke contact and ceased fire at 02:26, after Abe and Captain Gilbert Hoover (the captain of Helena and senior surviving U.S. officer) ordered their respective forces to disengage. Abe had one battleship (Kirishima), one light cruiser (Nagara), and four destroyers (Asagumo, Teruzuki, Yukikaze, and Harusame) with only light damage and four destroyers (Inazuma, Ikazuchi, Murasame, and Samidare) with moderate damage. The U.S. had only one light cruiser (Helena) and one destroyer (Fletcher) that were still capable of effective resistance. Although perhaps unclear to Abe, the way was now open for him to bombard Henderson Field and finish off the U.S. naval forces in the area, thus allowing the troops and supplies to be landed safely on Guadalcanal.

At this crucial juncture, Abe, like Mikawa before him and Kurita after him, chose to abandon the mission and depart the area. Several reasons are conjectured as to why he made this decision. Much of the special bombardment ammunition had been expended in the battle. If the bombardment failed to destroy the airfield, then his warships would be vulnerable to CAF air attack at dawn. His own injuries and the deaths of some of his staff from battle action may have affected Abe's judgement. Perhaps he was also unsure as to how many of his or the U.S. ships were still combat-capable because of communication problems with the damaged Hiei. Furthermore, his own ships were scattered and would have taken some time to reassemble for a coordinated resumption of the mission to attack Henderson Field and the remnants of the U.S. warship force. For whatever reason, Abe called for a disengagement and general retreat of his warships, although Yukikaze and Teruzuki remained behind to assist Hiei. Samidare picked up survivors from Yūdachi at 03:00 before joining the other Japanese ships in the retirement northwards.

=== Aftermath ===
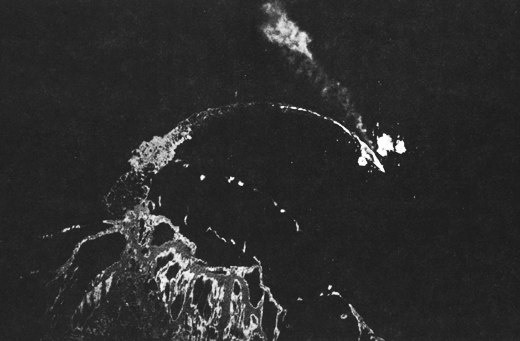
Hiei, trailing oil, is bombed by U.S. B-17 bombers from high altitude north of Savo Island on 13 November 1942.

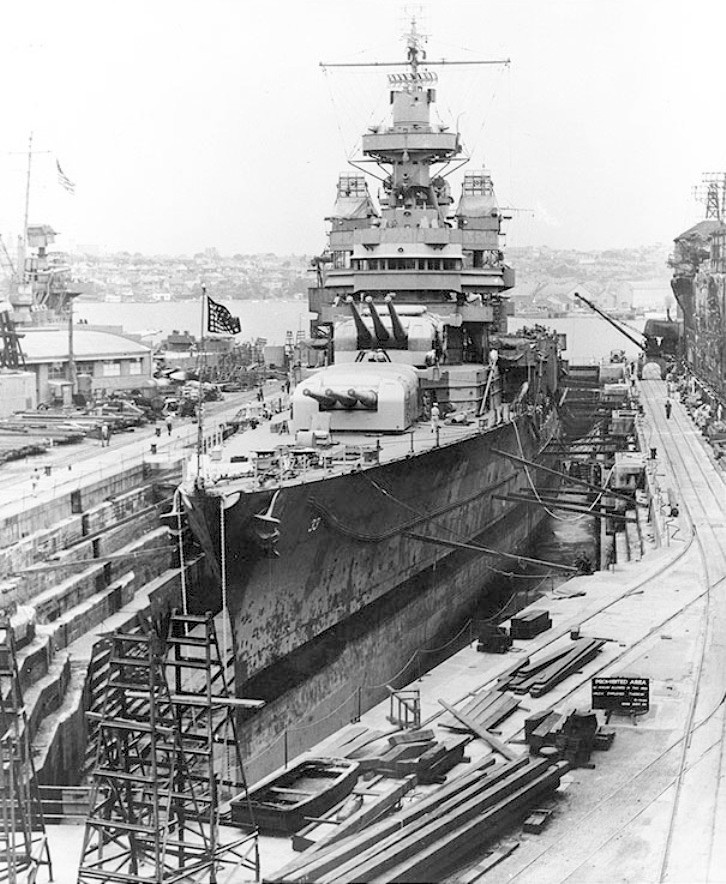
Portland undergoing repairs in dry dock in Sydney, Australia, a month after the battle

At 03:00 on 13 November, Admiral Yamamoto postponed the planned landings of the transports, which returned to the Shortlands to await further orders. Dawn revealed three crippled Japanese (Hiei, Yūdachi, and Amatsukaze) and three crippled U.S. ships (Portland, Atlanta, and Aaron Ward) in the general vicinity of Savo Island. Amatsukaze was attacked by U.S. dive bombers but escaped further damage as she headed to Truk, and she eventually returned to action several months later. The abandoned hulk of Yūdachi was sunk by Portland, whose guns were still functioning despite other damage to the ship. The tugboat Bobolink motored around Ironbottom Sound throughout the day of 13 November, assisting the damaged U.S. ships and rescuing U.S. survivors from the water.

During the morning and early afternoon, IJN carrier Jun'yō under the command of Vice Admiral Kakuji Kakuta, which was located about 200 miles north of the Solomons, dispatched several combat air patrols, consisting of Mitsubishi A6M Zero fighters and Nakajima B5N and Aichi D3A bombers (for navigational aid), to cover the crippled Hiei. In addition, several more patrols were dispatched from ground bases at Rabaul and Buin. These patrols engaged U.S. aircraft that were sent from Henderson Field and from the aircraft carrier Enterprise, but they could not save Hiei.

Hiei was attacked repeatedly by Marine Grumman TBF Avenger torpedo planes from Henderson Field, Navy TBF Avengers, and Douglas SBD Dauntless dive-bombers from Enterprise, which had departed Nouméa on 11 November, as well as Boeing B-17 Flying Fortress bombers of the U.S. Army Air Forces' 11th Bombardment Group from Espiritu Santo. Abe and his staff transferred to Yukikaze at 08:15. Kirishima was ordered by Abe to take Hiei under tow, escorted by Nagara and her destroyers, but the attempt was cancelled because of the threat of submarine attack and Hiei's increasing unseaworthiness. After sustaining more damage from air attacks, Hiei sank northwest of Savo Island, perhaps after being scuttled by her remaining crew, in the late evening of 13 November.

==== Sinking of Juneau ====
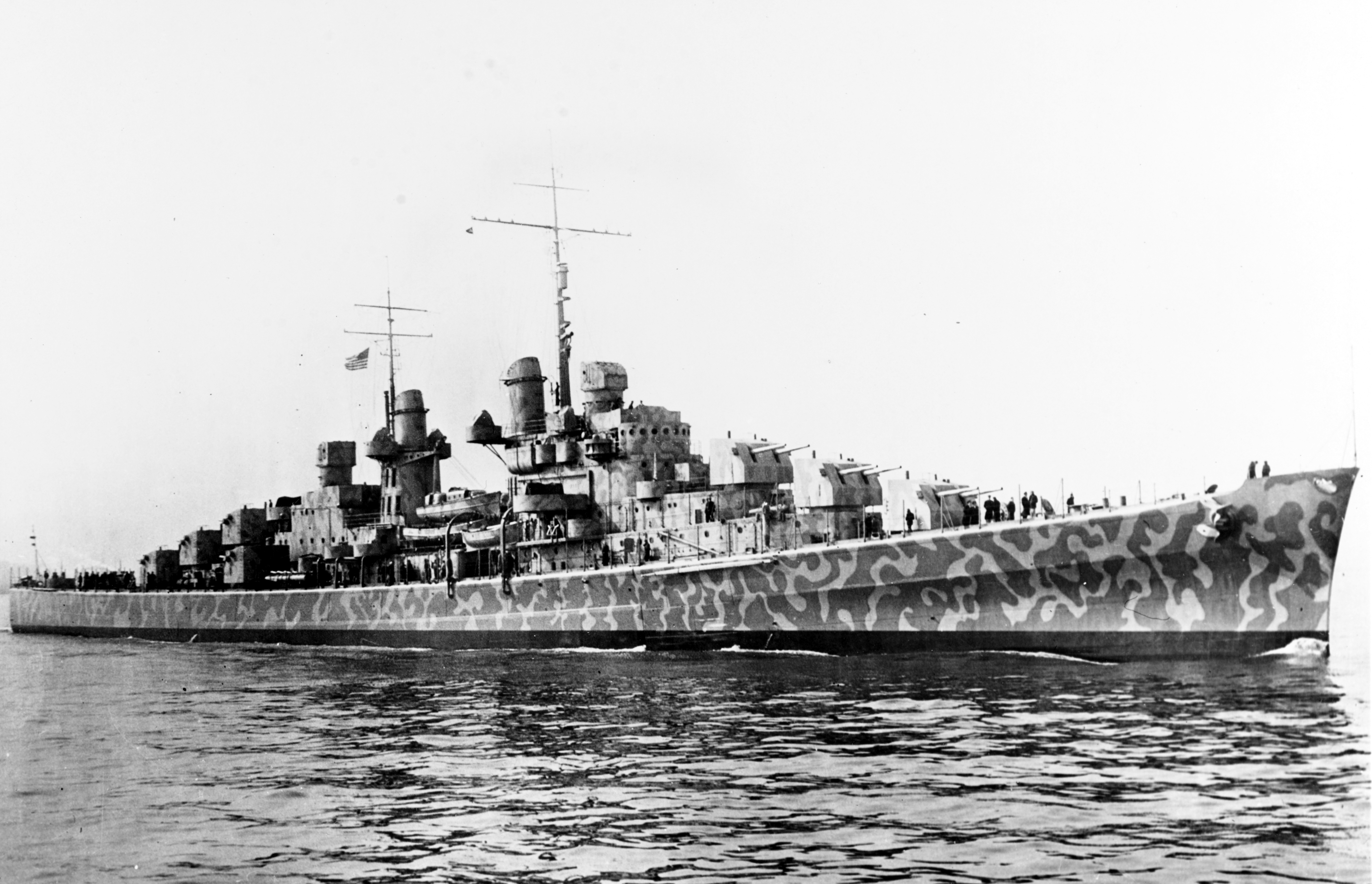
USS Juneau

Portland, San Francisco, Aaron Ward, and Sterett were eventually able to make their way to rear-area ports for repairs. Atlanta, however, sank near Guadalcanal at 20:00 on 13 November. Departing from the Solomon Islands area with San Francisco, Helena, Sterett, and O'Bannon later that day, Juneau and the other warships were detected by the Japanese submarine I-26, which fired three torpedoes. They missed their intended target, the crippled San Francisco, but one veered off and hit the crippled Juneau in the exact same location Amatsukaze's torpedo hit during the surface battle. This damage inflicted the coup de grâce as a massive explosion sent Juneau crashing to the ocean floor in under a minute. Juneau's 100+ survivors (out of a total complement of 697) were left to fend for themselves in the open ocean for eight days before rescue aircraft belatedly arrived. While awaiting rescue, all but ten of Juneau's crew had died from their injuries, the elements, or shark attacks. The dead included the five Sullivan brothers.

Most historians appear to agree that Abe's decision to retreat represented a strategic victory for the United States. Henderson Field remained operational with attack aircraft ready to deter the slow Imperial transports from approaching Guadalcanal with their precious cargoes. Plus, the Japanese had lost an opportunity to eliminate the U.S. naval forces in the area, a result which would have taken even the comparatively resource-rich U.S. some time to recover from. Reportedly furious, Admiral Yamamoto relieved Abe of command and later directed his forced retirement from the IJN. It appears that Yamamoto may have been more angry over the loss of one of his battleships (Hiei) than he was over the abandonment of the supply mission and failure to completely destroy the U.S. force. Shortly before noon, Yamamoto ordered Vice Admiral Nobutake Kondō, commanding the Second Fleet at Truk, to form a new bombardment unit around Kirishima and attack Henderson Field on the night of 14–15 November.

Including the sinking of Juneau, total U.S. losses in the battle were 1,439 dead. The Japanese suffered between 550 and 800 dead. The U.S. ships that were sunk or scuttled during the battle were two light cruisers, Atlanta and Juneau, and four destroyers, Monssen, Cushing, Laffey, and Barton. Sensitive over the heavy casualties it had suffered, the US Navy concealed full details of its personnel losses in the battle until near the end of the war. Analyzing the effect of this engagement, historian Richard B. Frank states:

This action stands without peer for furious, close-range, and confused fighting during the war. But the result was not decisive. The self-sacrifice of Callaghan and his task force had purchased one night's respite for Henderson Field. It had postponed, not stopped, the landing of major Japanese reinforcements, nor had the greater portion of the (Japanese) Combined Fleet yet been heard from."

== Transports approach, 13–14 November ==
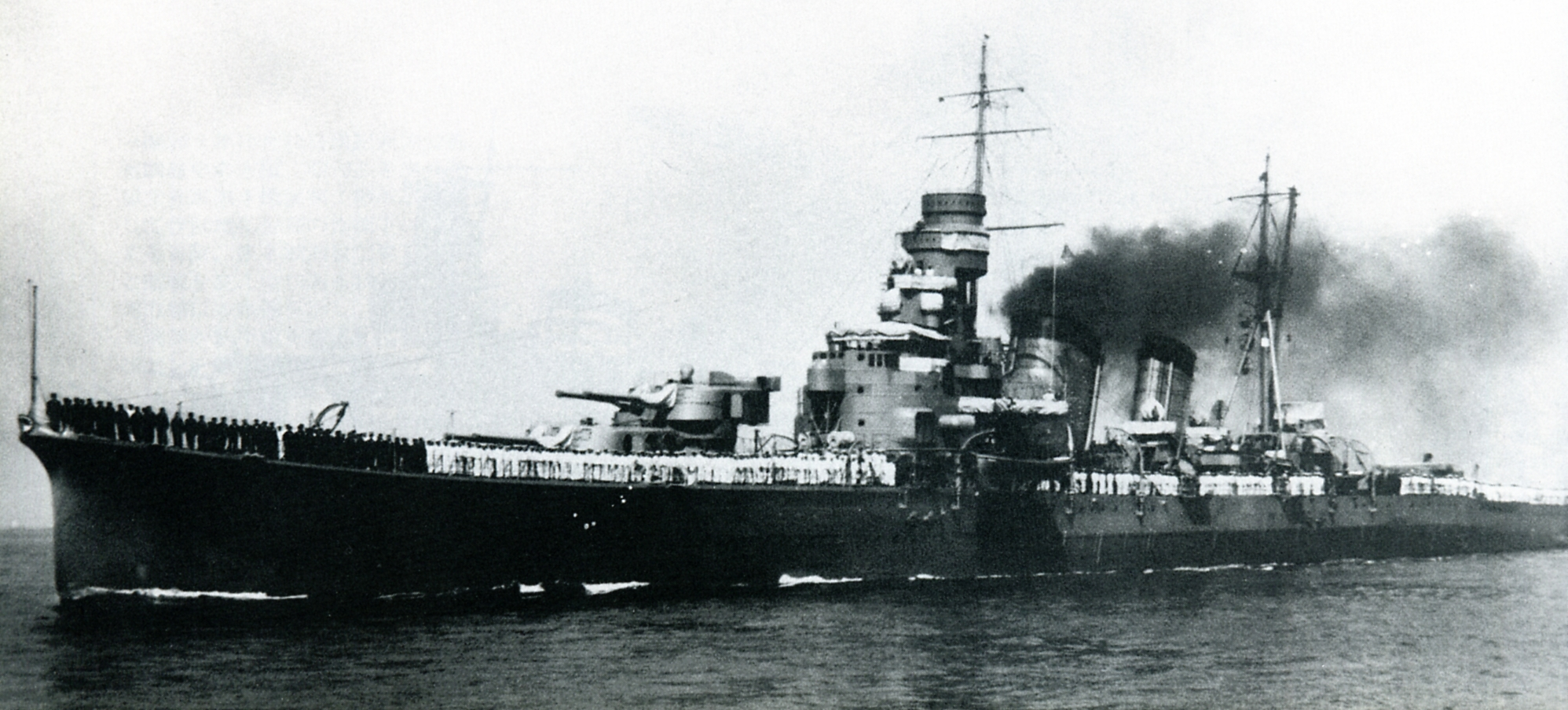
Japanese heavy cruiser Kinugasa

Although the reinforcement effort to Guadalcanal was delayed, the Japanese did not give up trying to complete the original mission, albeit a day later than originally planned. On the afternoon of 13 November, Tanaka and the 11 transports resumed their journey toward Guadalcanal. A Japanese force of cruisers and destroyers from the 8th Fleet (based primarily at Rabaul and originally assigned to cover the unloading of the transports on the evening of 13 November) was given the mission that Abe's force had failed to carry out—the bombardment of Henderson Field. The battleship Kirishima, after abandoning her rescue effort of Hiei on the morning of 13 November, steamed north between Santa Isabel and Malaita Islands with her accompanying warships to rendezvous with Kondo's Second Fleet, inbound from Truk, to form the new bombardment unit.

The 8th Fleet cruiser force, under the command of Mikawa, included the Takao-class heavy cruisers Chōkai and Maya, the Mogami-class Suzuya and the older and smaller Aoba-class Kinugasa, the light cruisers Isuzu and Tenryū, and six destroyers: Asashio, Arashio, Michishio, Kazagumo, Yugumo, Makigumo. Mikawa's force was able to slip into the Guadalcanal area uncontested, the battered U.S. naval force having withdrawn. Suzuya and Maya, under the command of Shōji Nishimura, bombarded Henderson Field while the rest of Mikawa's force cruised around Savo Island, guarding against any U.S. surface attack (which in the event did not occur). The 35-minute bombardment caused some damage to various aircraft and facilities on the airfield but did not put it out of operation. The cruiser force ended the bombardment around 02:30 on 14 November and cleared the area to head towards Rabaul on a course south of the New Georgia island group.

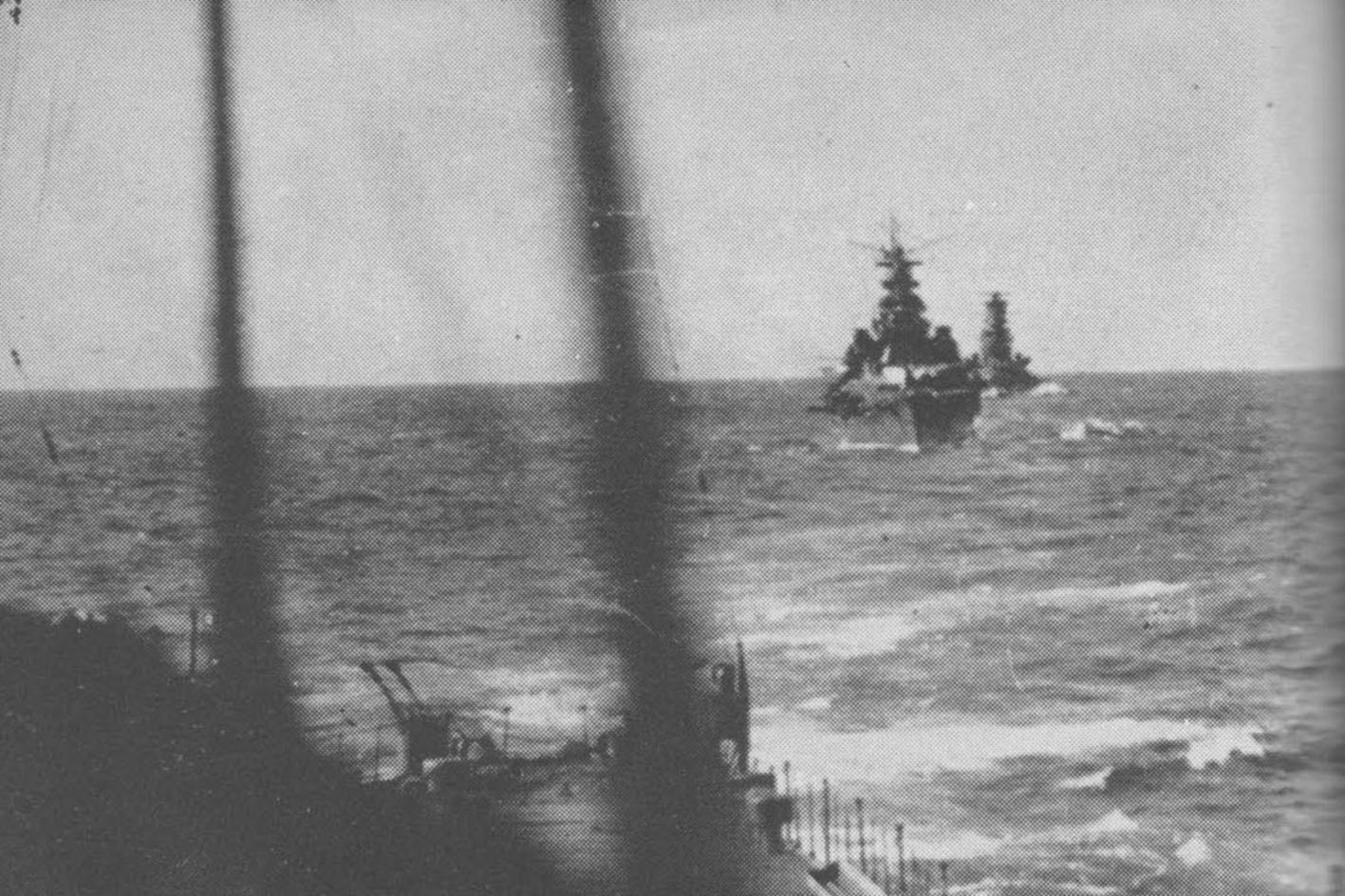
Kondo's bombardment force heads towards Guadalcanal during the day on 14 November. Photographed from the heavy cruiser Atago, the heavy cruiser Takao is followed by the battleship Kirishima.

At daybreak, aircraft from Henderson Field, Espiritu Santo, and Enterprise—stationed 200 nmi (230 mi; 370 km) south of Guadalcanal—began their attacks, first on Mikawa's force heading away from Guadalcanal, and then on the transport force heading towards the island. The attacks on Mikawa's force sank Kinugasa, killing 511 of her crew, and damaged Maya, forcing her to return to Japan for repairs. Chōkai suffered damage from near misses, causing some flooding and reduced speed. Michishio was critically damaged by near misses, losing all propulsion. She had to be towed out of the battle and then all the way back to Japan, arriving in March 1943 with repairs finished in November 1943. Two of Isuzu's boiler rooms were flooded as a result of near misses, reducing her speed.

Repeated air attacks on the transport force overwhelmed the escorting Japanese fighter aircraft, sank six of the transports, and forced one more to turn back with heavy damage, before she later sank. Survivors from the transports were rescued by the convoy's escorting destroyers and returned to the Shortlands. A total of 450 army troops were reported to have perished. The remaining four transports and four destroyers continued towards Guadalcanal after nightfall of 14 November but stopped west of Guadalcanal to await the outcome of a warship surface action developing nearby (see below) before continuing.

Kondo's ad hoc force rendezvoused at Ontong Java on the evening of 13 November, then reversed course and refueled out of range of Henderson Field's bombers on the morning of 14 November. The U.S. submarine Trout stalked but was unable to attack Kirishima during refueling. The bombardment force continued south and came under air attack late in the afternoon of 14 November, during which they were also attacked by the submarine Flying Fish, which launched five torpedoes (but scored no hits) before reporting her contact by radio.

Kinugasa was the third and last Japanese heavy cruiser to be sunk in the Solomon Islands campaign. Almost two years passed before the Japanese navy lost another, when six were sunk in the Battle of Leyte Gulf within the span of a few days.

== Second Naval Battle of Guadalcanal, 14–15 November ==
=== Prelude ===
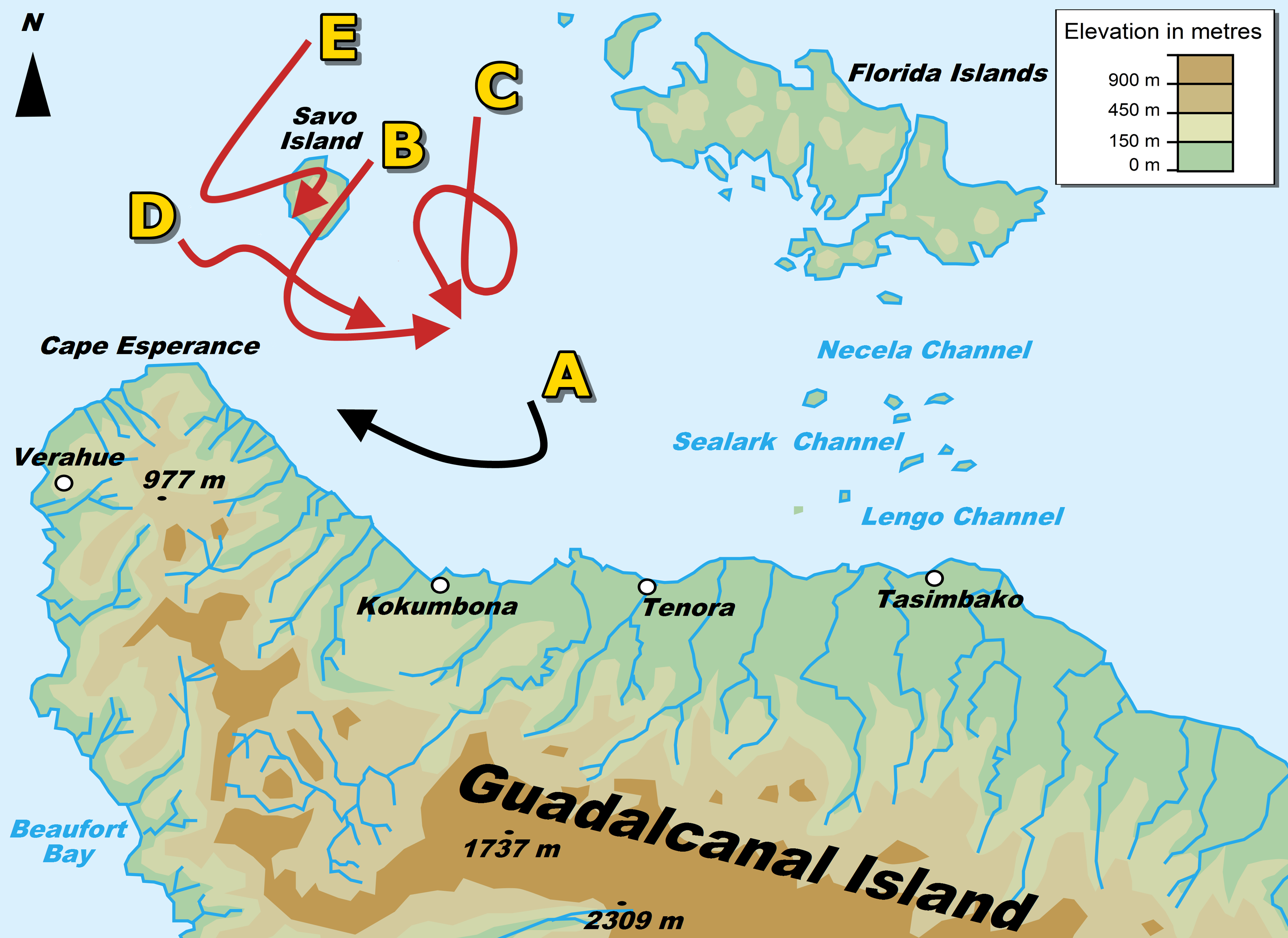
First phase of the engagement, 23:17–23:30, 14 November. Red lines are Japanese warship forces and black line is the U.S. warship force.

Kondo's force approached Guadalcanal via Indispensable Strait around midnight on 14 November, and a quarter moon provided moderate visibility of about 7 km (3.8 nmi; 4.3 mi). The force included Kirishima, heavy cruisers Atago and Takao, light cruisers Nagara and Sendai, and nine destroyers, some of the destroyers being survivors (along with Kirishima and Nagara) of the first night engagement two days prior. Kondo flew his flag in the cruiser Atago.

(d = damaged; D = crippled; S = sunk; s = sunk soon after)

1 fast battleship

Kongo-class (8 × 14-in. main battery): Kirishima (S)

2 heavy cruisers

Takao-class (10 × 7.9-in. main battery): Takao, Atago (d)

2 light cruisers

1 Nagara-class (7 × 5.5-in. main battery): Nagara
1 Sendai-class (7 × 5.5-in. main battery): Sendai

11 destroyers

2 Kagerō-class (6 x 5-in. main battery) Kagerō, Oyashio
1 Asashio-class (6 × 5-in. main battery): Asagumo
1 Shiratsuyu-class (5 × 5-in. main battery): Samidare
1 Akatsuki-class (6 × 5-in. main battery): Inazuma
5 Fubuki-class (6 × 5-in. main battery): Hatsuyuki, Shirayuki, Shikinami, Uranami, Ayanami (S)
1 Akizuki-class (8 × 3.9-in. main battery): Teruzuki

Low on undamaged ships, Admiral William Halsey, Jr., detached the new battleships Washington and South Dakota, of Enterprise's support group, together with four destroyers, as TF 64 under Admiral Willis A. "Ching" Lee to defend Guadalcanal and Henderson Field. It was a scratch force; the battleships had operated together for only a few days, and their four escorts were from four different divisions—chosen simply because, of the available destroyers, they had the most fuel. The U.S. force arrived in Ironbottom Sound in the evening of 14 November and began patrolling around Savo Island. The U.S. warships were in column formation with the four destroyers in the lead, followed by Washington, with South Dakota bringing up the rear.

2 fast battleships

North Carolina-class (9 × 16-in. main battery): Washington
South Dakota-class (9 × 16-in. main battery): South Dakota (D)

4 destroyers

1 Gleaves-class (5 × 5-in. main battery): Gwin (D)
1 Sims-class (5 × 5-in. main battery): Walke (S)
1 Benham-class (4 × 5-in. main battery): Benham (Ds)
1 Mahan-class (5 × 5-in. main battery): Preston (S)

At 22:55 on 14 November, radar on South Dakota and Washington began picking up Kondo's approaching ships near Savo Island, at a distance of around 18,000 m (20,000 yd).

=== Action ===
Kondo split his force into several groups with one group—commanded by Shintaro Hashimoto and consisting of Sendai and destroyers Shikinami and Uranami ("C" on the maps)—sweeping along the east side of Savo Island, and destroyer Ayanami ("B" on the maps) sweeping counterclockwise around the southwest side of Savo Island to check for the presence of Allied ships. The Japanese ships spotted Lee's force around 23:00, though Kondo misidentified the battleships as cruisers. Kondo ordered the Sendai group of ships—plus Nagara and four destroyers ("D" on the maps)—to engage and destroy the U.S. force before he brought the bombardment force of Kirishima and heavy cruisers ("E" on the maps) into Ironbottom Sound. The U.S. ships ("A" on the maps) detected the Sendai force on radar but did not detect the other groups of Japanese ships. Using radar targeting, the two U.S. battleships opened fire on the Sendai group at 23:17. Admiral Lee ordered a cease fire about five minutes later after the northern group disappeared from his ship's radar. Sendai, Uranami, and Shikinami were undamaged and circled out of the danger area.

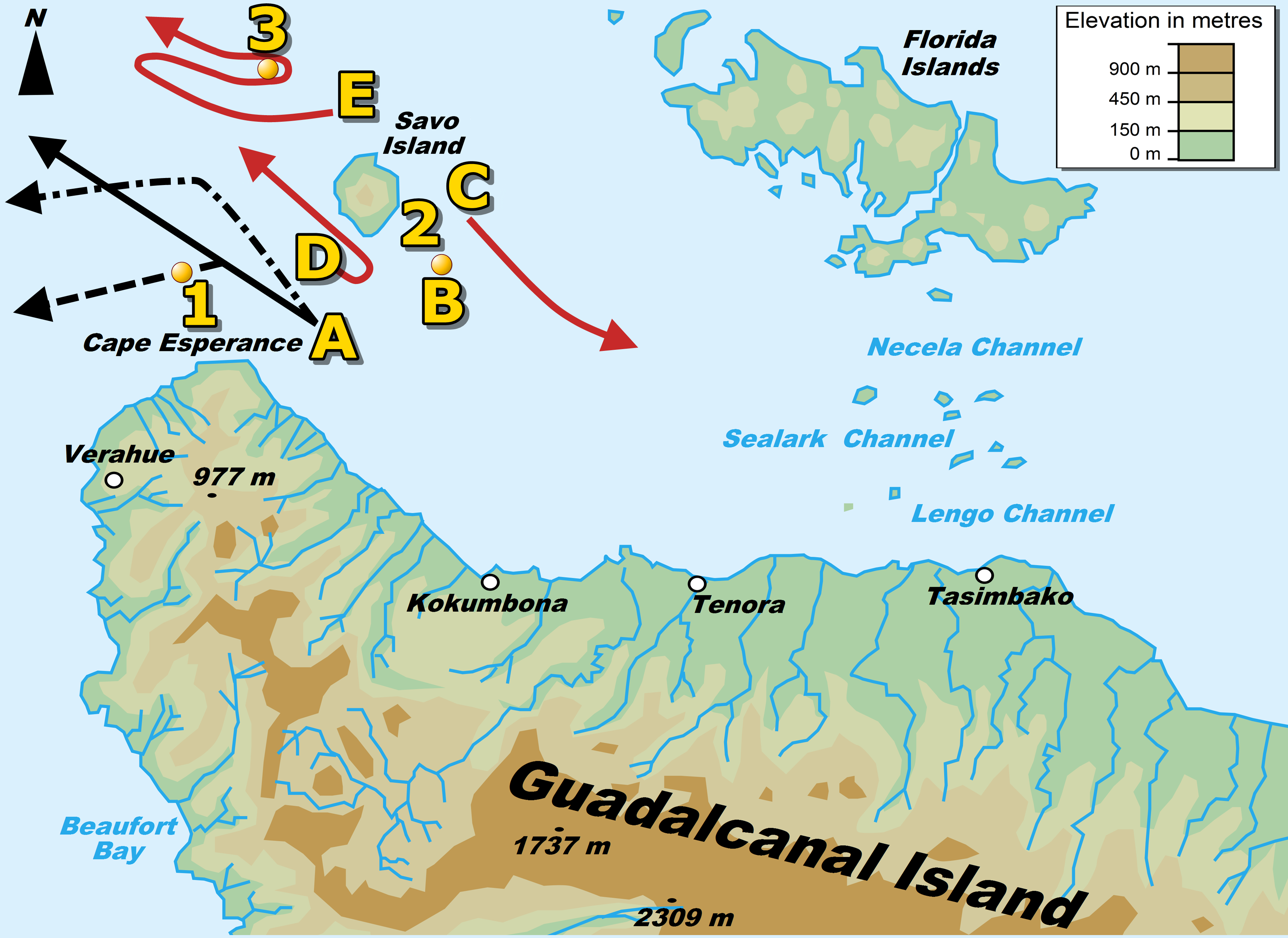
Second phase of the engagement, 23:30–02:00. Red lines are Japanese warship forces and black lines are U.S. warships. Numbered yellow dots represent sinking warships.

==== U.S. escort wiped out ====
Meanwhile, the four U.S. destroyers in the vanguard of the U.S. formation began engaging both Ayanami and the Nagara group of ships at 23:22. Nagara and her escorting destroyers responded effectively with accurate gunfire and torpedoes. Nagara scored the first kill of this stage of the battle when she focused her gunfire on the destroyer Preston, hitting her some nine times which ignited her magazines. Ayanami meanwhile targeted the destroyer Walke, hitting her with several shells and a torpedo that blew off her bow. Both of these destroyers sank within 10 minutes. Another stray torpedo from Ayanami hit the destroyer Benham and blew off her bow (leading to her being scuttled the next day). Gunfire from the Japanese ships finally hit Gwin in her engine room and put her out of the fight. The U.S. destroyers had completed their mission as screens for the battleships, absorbing the initial impact of contact with the enemy although at great cost. Lee ordered the retirement of Benham and Gwin at 23:48.

==== South Dakota in peril ====
Washington passed through the area still occupied by the damaged and sinking U.S. destroyers and fired on Ayanami with her secondary batteries, setting her afire. Following close behind, South Dakota suddenly suffered a series of electrical failures, reportedly during repairs when her chief engineer locked down a circuit breaker in violation of safety procedures, causing her circuits repeatedly to go into series, making her radar, radios, and most of her gun batteries inoperable. Nonetheless, she continued to follow Washington towards the western side of Savo Island until 23:35, when Washington changed course left to pass to the southward behind the burning destroyers. South Dakota tried to follow but had to turn to starboard to avoid Benham which resulted in the ship being silhouetted by the fires of the burning destroyers and made her a closer and easier target for the Japanese.

Receiving reports of the destruction of the U.S. destroyers from Ayanami and his other ships, Kondo pointed his bombardment force towards Guadalcanal, believing that the U.S. warship force had been defeated. His force and the two U.S. battleships were now heading towards each other.

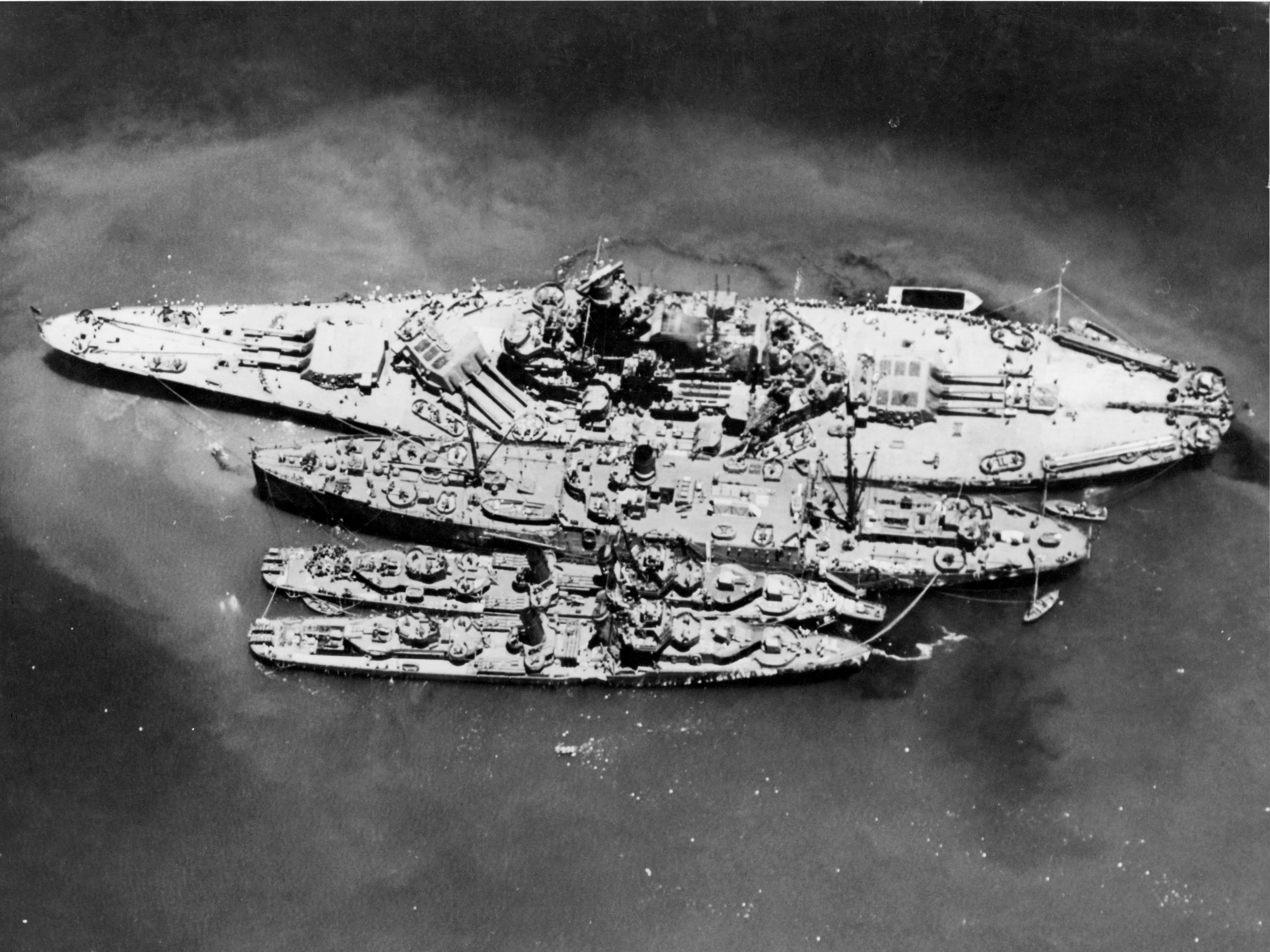
South Dakota moored next to the repair ship Prometheus shortly after the battle being patched up

Almost blind and unable to effectively fire her main and secondary armament, South Dakota was illuminated by searchlights and targeted by gunfire and torpedoes by most of the ships of the Japanese force including Kirishima, beginning around midnight on 15 November. South Dakota took 27 hits—three 14-inch (356 mm) shells and six 6-inch (152 mm) shells from Kirishima, and sixteen 8-inch (203 mm) shells and two 5-inch (127 mm) shells from Takao and Atago—that completely knocked out her communications and remaining gunfire control operations, set portions of her upper decks on fire, and forced her to try to steer away from the engagement. All of the Japanese torpedoes missed. Admiral Lee later described the cumulative effect of the gunfire damage to South Dakota as to, "render one of our new battleships deaf, dumb, blind, and impotent." South Dakota's crew casualties were 39 killed and 59 wounded, and she turned away from the battle at 00:17 without informing Admiral Lee, though observed by Kondo's lookouts.

==== Washington to the rescue ====
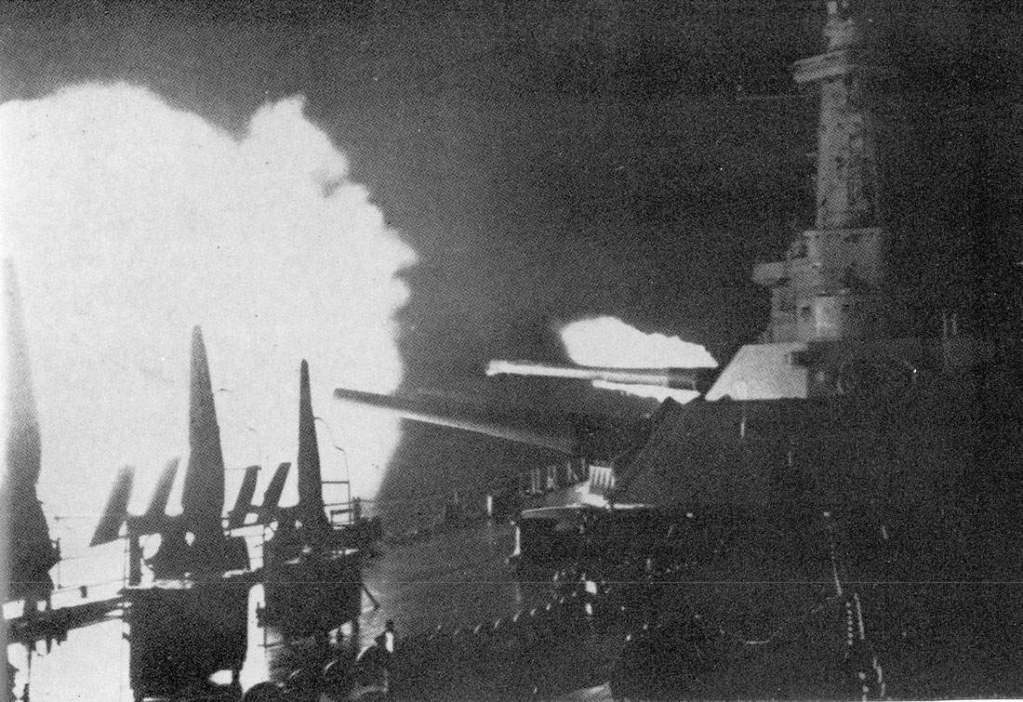
USS Washington firing on Kirishima at 8,400 yards, 15 November 1942

The Japanese ships continued to concentrate their fire on South Dakota and none detected Washington approaching to within 9,000 yd (8,200 m). Washington was tracking a large target (Kirishima) for some time but refrained from firing since there was a chance it could be South Dakota. Washington had not been able to track South Dakota's movements because she was in a blind spot in Washington's radar and Lee could not raise her on the radio to confirm her position. When the Japanese illuminated and fired on South Dakota, all doubts were removed as to which ships were friend or foe. From this close range, Washington opened fire and pummeled Kirishima with between eight and 20 main battery shells, and at least 17 secondary ones, disabling all of Kirishima's main gun turrets, causing major flooding, and setting her aflame. (Note: The number of actual hits is a matter of conjecture. USS Washington observed eight main battery hits. The US Strategic Bombing Survey estimated 9 major caliber and 40 secondary battery hits based on one postwar interview with a junior officer. Kirishima's damage control officer identified 20 main battery hits and 17 five-inch hits on a schematic drawing, including several underwater hits which would have been invisible to Washington. Examination of the wreck has confirmed the location of three of these underwater hits, lending credence to his account.) Kirishima was hit below the waterline and suffered a jammed rudder, causing her to circle uncontrollably to port. Washington also fired on Atago with her secondary battery, lightly damaging the cruiser with a single 5-inch (127 mm) shell hit.

At 00:25, Kondo ordered all of his ships that were able to, to converge and destroy any remaining U.S. ships. Having just joined the battle upon hearing of the engagement, the destroyers Kagerō and Oyashio fired their torpedoes at Washington, but none of them hit the battleship, while the other surviving U.S. ships had already departed the battle area. Washington steered a northwesterly course toward the Russell Islands to draw the Japanese force away from Guadalcanal and the presumably damaged South Dakota. The Japanese ships finally sighted Washington and launched several torpedo attacks, but she avoided all of them and also avoided running aground in shallow waters. At length, believing that the way was clear for the transport convoy to proceed to Guadalcanal (but apparently disregarding the threat of air attack in the morning), Kondo ordered his remaining ships to break contact and retire from the area about 01:04, which most of the Japanese warships complied with by 01:30.

=== Aftermath ===
Ayanami was scuttled by Uranami at 02:00, while Kirishima capsized and sank by 03:25 on 15 November. Uranami rescued survivors from Ayanami and destroyers Asagumo, Teruzuki, and Samidare rescued the remaining crew from Kirishima. Three U.S. destroyers, Walke, Benham, and Preston, were sunk during the battle. In the engagement, 242 U.S. and 249 Japanese sailors died. The engagement was one of only two battleship-against-battleship surface battles in the Pacific campaign of World War II, the other being at the Surigao Strait during the Battle of Leyte Gulf.

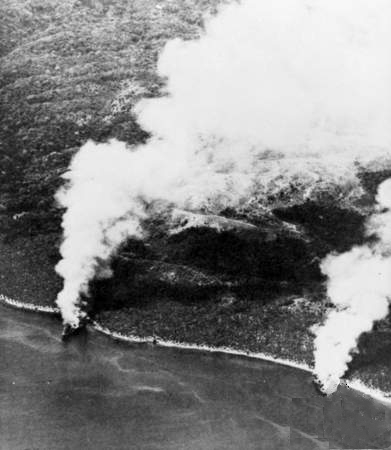
Two Japanese transports Hirokawa Maru and Kinugawa Maru beached and burning on Guadalcanal 15 November 1942

The four Japanese transports beached themselves at Tassafaronga on Guadalcanal by 04:00 on 15 November, and Tanaka and the escort destroyers departed and raced back up the Slot toward safer waters. The transports were attacked, beginning at 05:55, by U.S. aircraft from Henderson Field and elsewhere, and by field artillery from U.S. ground forces on Guadalcanal. Later, the destroyer Meade approached and opened fire on the beached transports and surrounding area. These attacks set the transports afire and destroyed any equipment on them that the Japanese had not yet managed to unload. Only 2,000 to 3,000 of the embarked troops made it to Guadalcanal, and most of their ammunition and food was lost.

Yamamoto's reaction to Kondo's failure to accomplish his mission of neutralizing Henderson Field and ensuring the safe landing of troops and supplies was milder than his earlier reaction to Abe's withdrawal, perhaps because of Imperial Navy culture and politics. Kondo, who also held the position of second in command of the Combined Fleet, was a member of the upper staff and battleship "clique" of the Imperial Navy, while Abe was a career destroyer specialist. Admiral Kondo was not reprimanded or reassigned, but, instead, was left in command of one of the large ship fleets based at Truk.

== Significance ==
The failure to deliver to Guadalcanal most of the troops and especially supplies in the convoy prevented the Japanese from launching another offensive to retake Henderson Field. Thereafter, the Imperial Navy was able to deliver only subsistence supplies and a few replacement troops to Japanese Army forces on Guadalcanal. Because of the continuing threat from Allied aircraft based at Henderson Field, plus nearby U.S. aircraft carriers, the Japanese had to continue to rely on Tokyo Express warship deliveries to their forces on Guadalcanal. These supplies and replacements were not enough to sustain Japanese troops on the island, who – by 7 December 1942 – were losing about 50 men each day from malnutrition, disease, and Allied ground and air attacks. On 12 December, the Japanese Navy proposed that Guadalcanal be abandoned. Despite opposition from Japanese Army leaders, who still hoped that Guadalcanal could be retaken from the Allies, Japan's Imperial General Headquarters—with approval from the Emperor—agreed on 31 December to the evacuation of all Japanese forces from the island and establishment of a new line of defense for the Solomons on New Georgia.

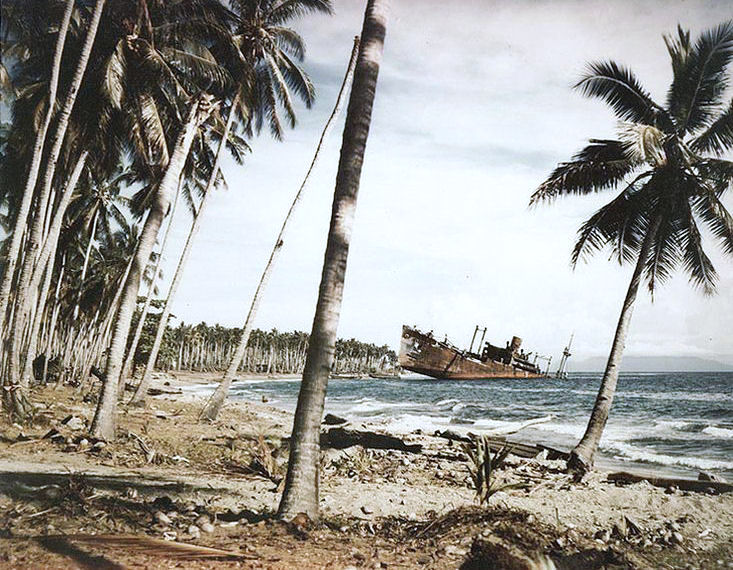
The wreck of one of the four Japanese transports Kinugawa Maru beached and destroyed at Guadalcanal on 15 November 1942, photographed one year later.

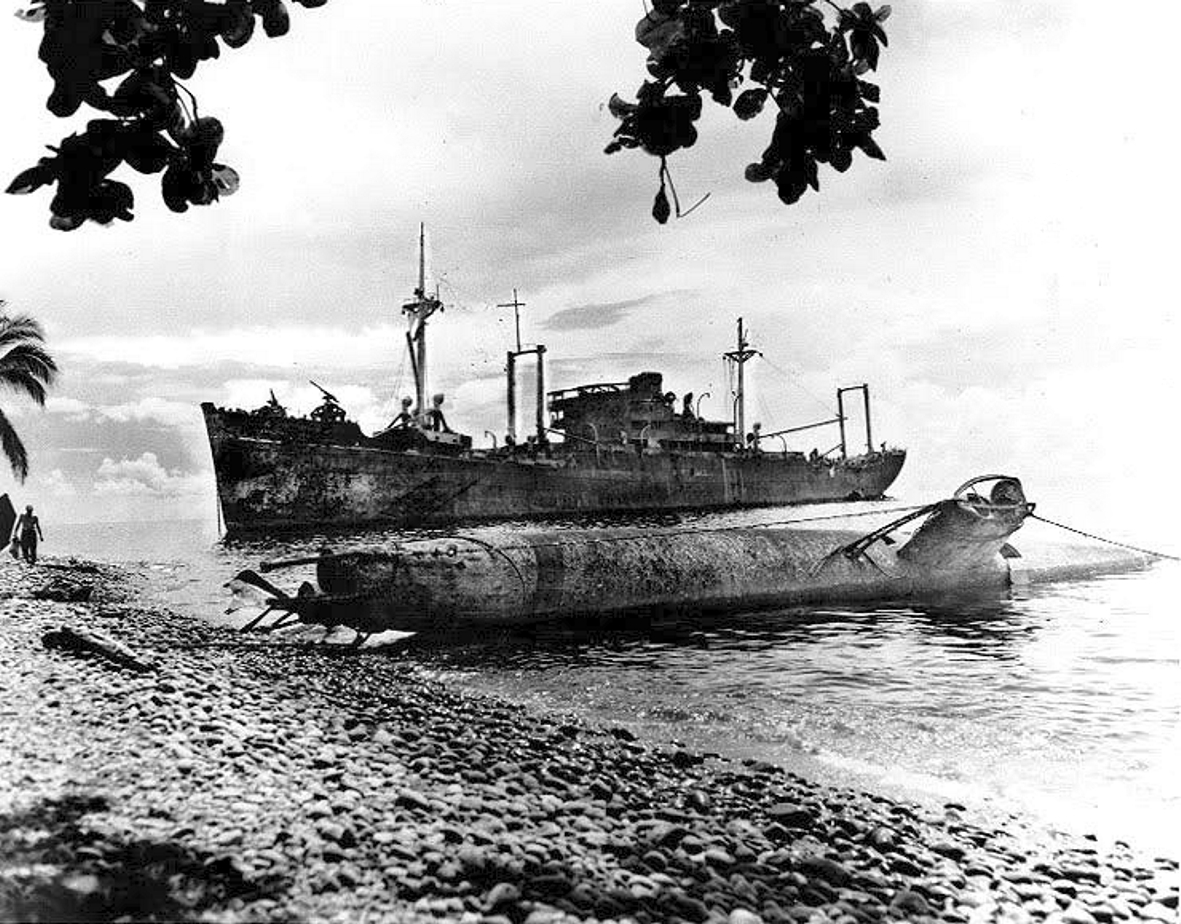
The wreck of Yamazuki Maru and a Japanese midget submarine off Guadalcanal

Thus, the Naval Battle of Guadalcanal was the last major attempt by the Japanese to seize control of the seas around Guadalcanal or to retake the island. In contrast, the U.S. Navy was thereafter able to resupply the U.S. forces at Guadalcanal at will, including the delivery of two fresh divisions by late December 1942. The inability to neutralize Henderson Field doomed the Japanese effort to successfully combat the Allied conquest of Guadalcanal. The last Japanese resistance in the Guadalcanal campaign ended on 9 February 1943, with the successful evacuation of most of the surviving Japanese troops from the island by the Japanese Navy in Operation Ke. Building on their success at Guadalcanal and elsewhere, the Allies continued their campaign against Japan, which culminated in Japan's defeat and the end of World War II. U.S. President Franklin Roosevelt, upon learning of the results of the battle, commented, "It would seem that the turning point in this war has at last been reached."

Historian Eric Hammel sums up the significance of the Naval Battle of Guadalcanal this way:

On November 12, 1942, the (Japanese) Imperial Navy had the better ships and the better tactics. After November 15, 1942, its leaders lost heart and it lacked the strategic depth to face the burgeoning U.S. Navy and its vastly improving weapons and tactics. The Japanese never got better while, after November 1942, the U.S. Navy never stopped getting better.

General Alexander Vandegrift, the commander of the troops on Guadalcanal, paid tribute to the sailors who fought the battle:

We believe the enemy has undoubtedly suffered a crushing defeat. We thank Admiral Kinkaid for his intervention yesterday. We thank Lee for his sturdy effort last night. Our own aircraft has been grand in its relentless hammering of the foe. All those efforts are appreciated but our greatest homage goes to Callaghan, Scott and their men who with magnificent courage against seemingly hopeless odds drove back the first hostile attack and paved the way for the success to follow. To them the men of Cactus lift their battered helmets in deepest admiration.
