= Kinugawa Maru =

Japanese transport ship

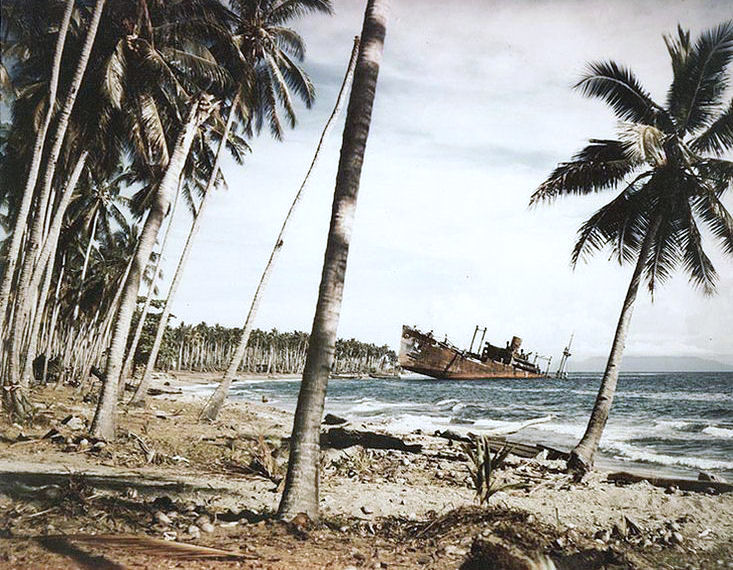
- Kinugawa Maru beached and sunk on Guadalcanal, November 1943

History

Empire of Japan
- Name: Kinugawa Maru
- Builder: Mitsubishi Heavy Industries
- Laid down: 1938
- Launched: 1938
- Completed: 1938
- Acquired: Requisitioned by Imperial Japanese Army
- Fate: Beached and destroyed, Guadalcanal, 15 November 1942

General characteristics
- Type: Armed transport
- Displacement: 6,937 GRT
- Length: 133 m (436 ft 4 in)
- Beam: 18 m (59 ft 1 in)
- Propulsion: Diesel engine, single screw
- Speed: 16 knots (30 km/h; 18 mph)
- Armament: Anti-aircraft gun

Kinugawa Maru was a Japanese transport ship built in 1938 for civilian service and later requisitioned by the Imperial Japanese Army as an armed transport. She took part in the Japanese reinforcement attempts to retake Guadalcanal in November 1942 and was beached and destroyed on 15 November 1942. The wreck, known locally as "Bonegi 2", lies close to shore and remains a popular dive site from Bonegi (Mbonege) Beach.

== Design and construction ==
Kinugawa Maru was built by Mitsubishi Heavy Industries at Nagasaki in 1938. Originally constructed as a cargo/passenger vessel, she was assessed at 6,937 gross register tons (GRT) and measured about 133 metres (436 ft 4 in) in length.

The ship was later requisitioned by the Imperial Japanese Army (IJA) and converted for use as an armed transport. This included installation of anti-aircraft weaponry for operations in areas exposed to Allied air attack.

== Service history ==
=== Early operations ===
As an IJA transport, Kinugawa Maru carried troops and supplies throughout the Southwest Pacific. Her movements prior to late 1942 are documented in Japanese postwar loss summaries and Allied intelligence assessments.

=== Solomon Islands campaign ===
In November 1942, Kinugawa Maru sailed as part of the major Japanese reinforcement convoy sent down The Slot toward Guadalcanal. After heavy American air attacks on 14 November crippled or sank most of the transports, Kinugawa Maru and three other surviving transport ships (Hirokawa Maru, Yamaura Maru and Yamatsuki Maru) were ordered by Admiral Kondō to beach and offload troops.

== Sinking ==
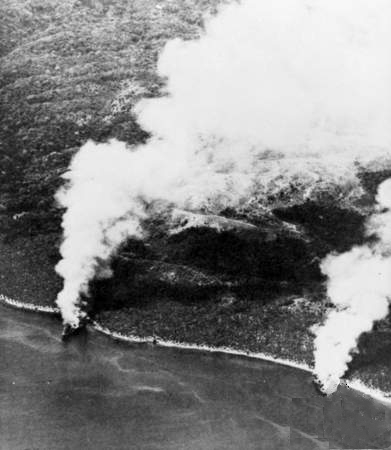
Hirokawa Maru and Kinugawa Maru beached and burning

In the early hours of 15 November 1942, Kinugawa Maru was deliberately beached on the shore near Bonegi to disembark soldiers before daylight. Once stranded, the ship became a stationary target. At dawn, the beached vessel came under attack from artillery, aircraft, and naval gunfire. Fires broke out aboard the ship, and continued bombardment reduced her to a burned-out hulk. Allied forces recorded the ship as destroyed on 15 November 1942.

== Wreck ==
The wreck of Kinugawa Maru lies just off Bonegi (Mbonege) Beach, northwest of Honiara. The engine remains partly above the waterline and the stern lies in 27 m. Kinugawa Maru is known locally as "Bonegi 2" and is frequently dived due to its accessibility, abundant corals, and other marine life. ("Bonegi 1" is the nearby wreck of Hirokawa Maru.)

== Gallery ==
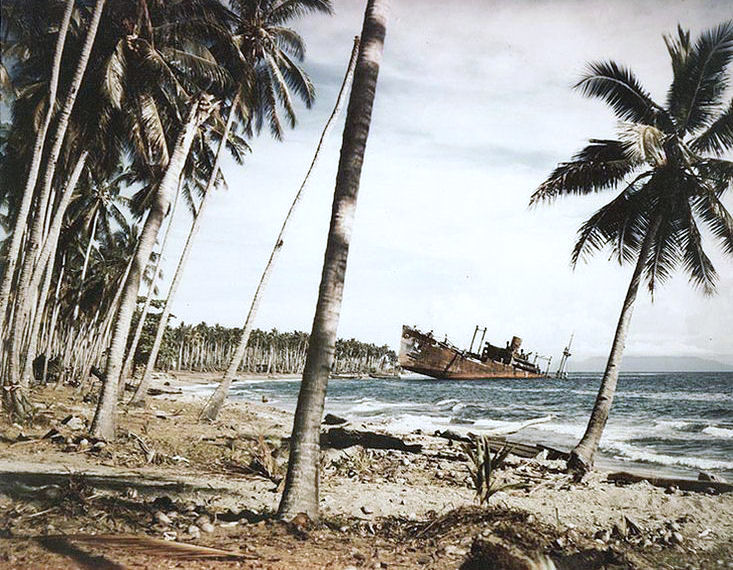
Kinugawa Maru beached and sunk on Guadalcanal, 1943

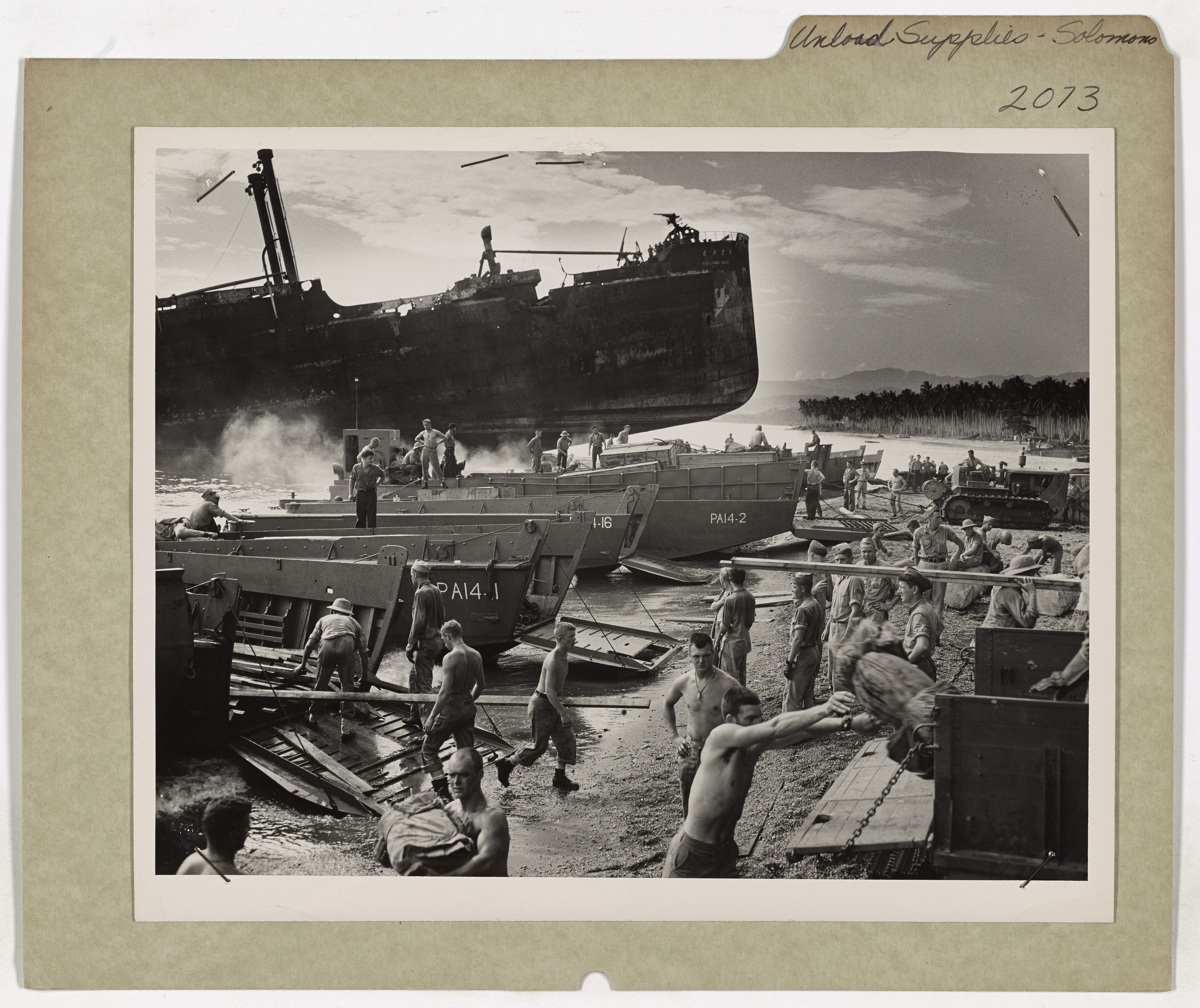
Marines unloading supplies in the shadow of Kinugawa Maru.

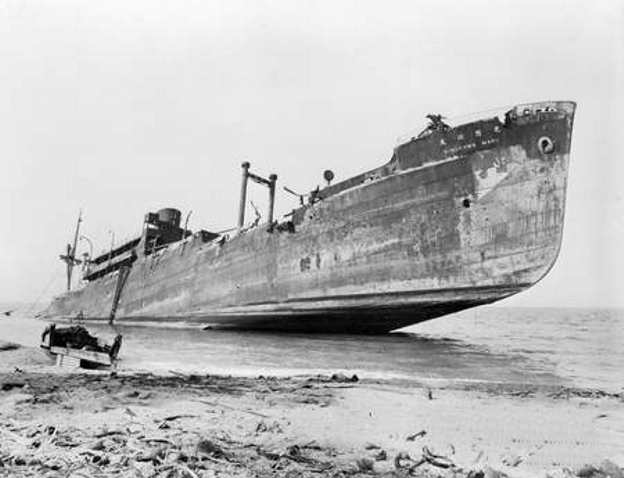
Wreck of Kinugawa Maru, c. 1943

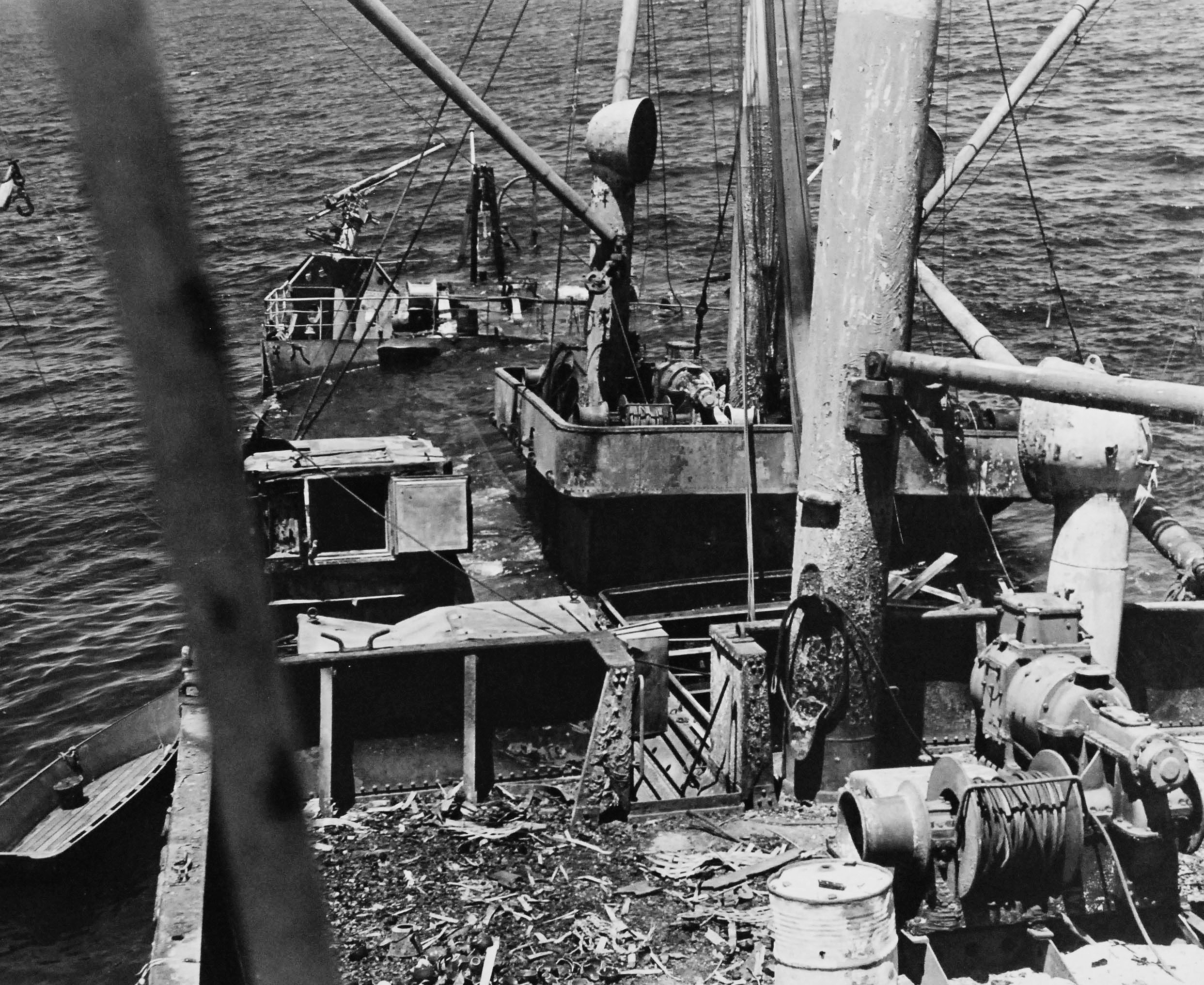
Afterdeck of Kinugawa Maru, May 1943

== See also ==
- Naval Battle of Guadalcanal
- Guadalcanal campaign
- Ironbottom Sound
