= Ironbottom Sound =

WWII ship graveyard in the Solomon Islands

Coordinates: 9°15′S 160°0′E

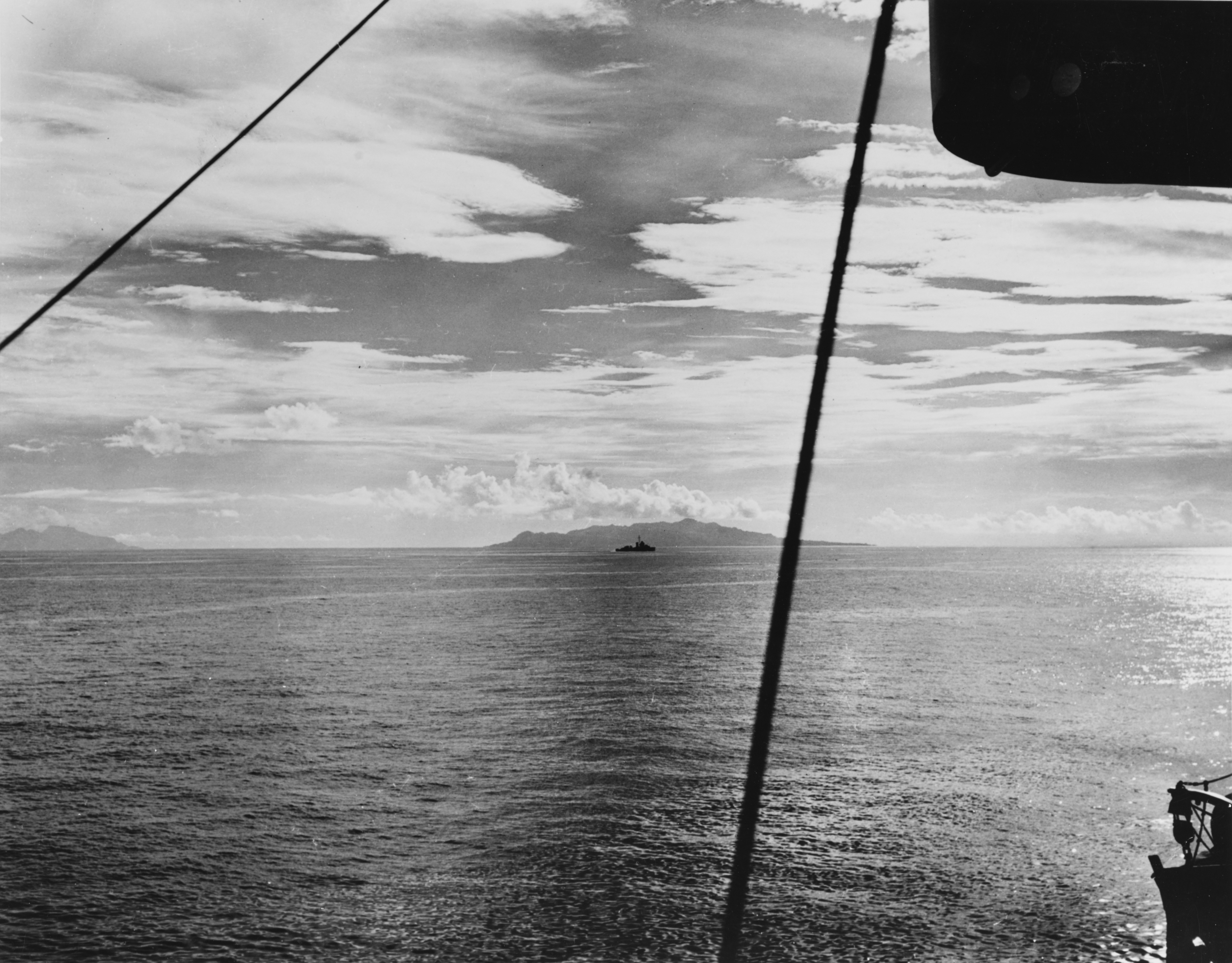
Ironbottom Sound, Savo Island (center), and Guadalcanal (left) on 7 August 1942, the day Allied forces landed on Guadalcanal and Tulagi.

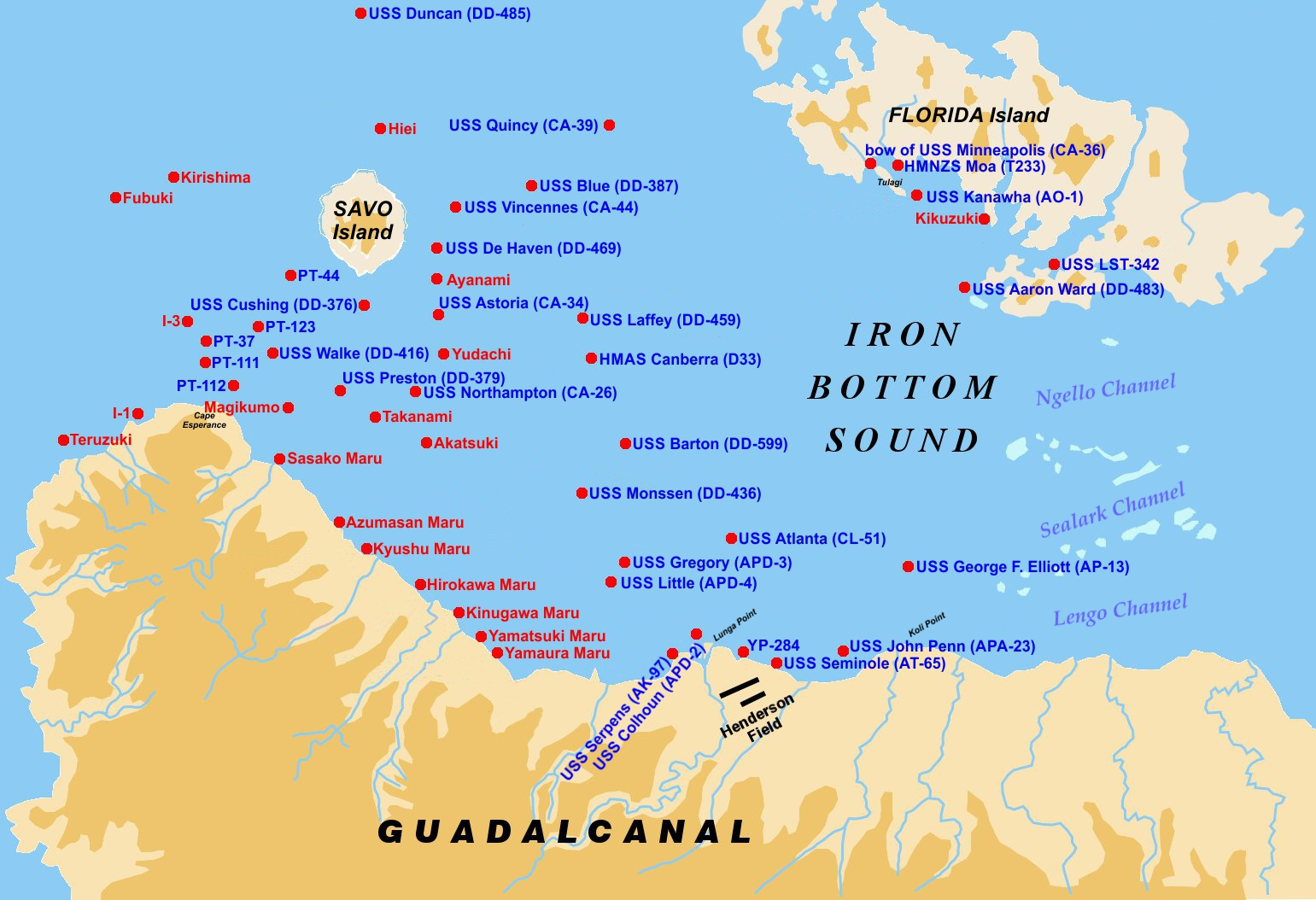
Shipwrecks in the Ironbottom Sound

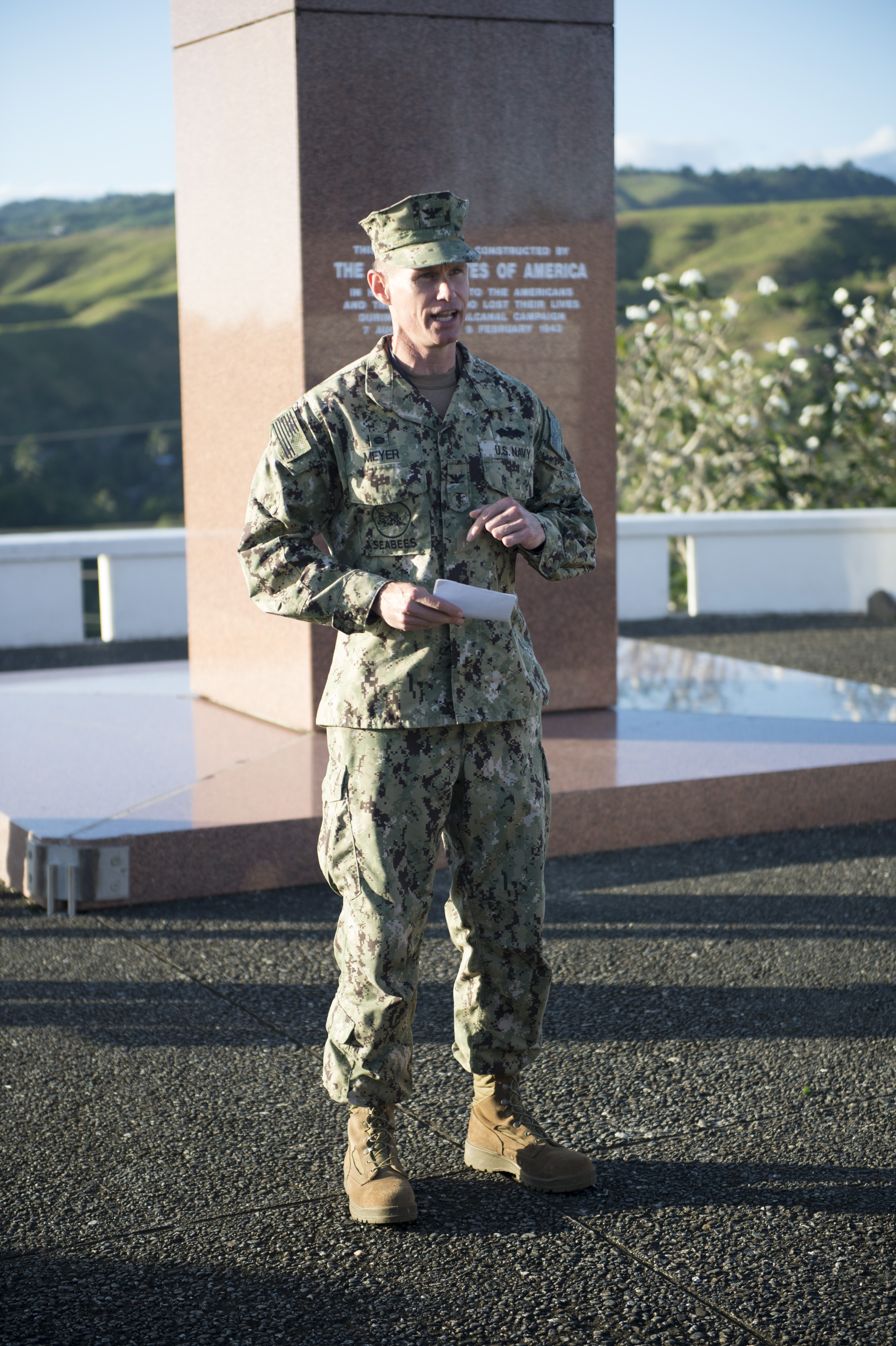
Wreath-laying ceremony at Guadalcanal in 2015

"Ironbottom Sound" (alternatively Iron Bottom Sound or Ironbottomed Sound or Iron Bottom Bay) is the name given by Allied sailors to the stretch of water at the southern end of The Slot between Guadalcanal, Savo Island, and Nggela Islands of the Solomon Islands, because of the many ships and planes that sank there during the naval actions comprising the Battle of Guadalcanal during 1942–1943. Before the war, it was called Savo Sound. Every year on the battle's anniversary, a US ship cruises into the waters and drops a wreath to commemorate the men who lost their lives.

== Naval actions comprising the Battle of Guadalcanal ==
- Battle of Savo Island, 9 August 1942
- Battle of Cape Esperance, 11–12 October 1942
- Naval Battle of Guadalcanal, 13–15 November 1942
- Battle of Tassafaronga, 30 November 1942
- Operation I-Go, 1–16 April 1943

== Sunken ships ==
Over 50 vessels were sunk in Ironbottom Sound during the Guadalcanal Campaign. Some of the more notable wrecks are listed below.

=== Japanese ===
==== Cape Esperance, 11–12 October 1942 ====
- Fubuki – Fubuki-class destroyer
- Furutaka – Furutaka-class heavy cruiser; wreck located 30 km (16 nmi; 19 mi) northwest of Savo Island

==== First Naval Battle of Guadalcanal, 13 November 1942 ====
- Akatsuki – Akatsuki-class destroyer
- Yūdachi – Shiratsuyu-class destroyer
- Hiei – Kongō-class battlecruiser

==== Second Naval Battle of Guadalcanal, 15 November 1942 ====
- Kirishima – Kongō-class battlecruiser
- Ayanami – Fubuki-class destroyer
- Yamatsuki Maru – troop transport beached and then attacked by US bombers. These attacks set the transports afire and destroyed most equipment not unloaded before dawn. In September and October 1944, the wreck was used as a target for tests of the TDR-1 Drone by STAG-1 based at North Field on Banika, Russell Islands as part of the top secret project testing of America's first guided missile.
- Yamaura Maru – troop transport beached in Doma Cove
- Hirokawa Maru – military transport; grounded and lost to air attack
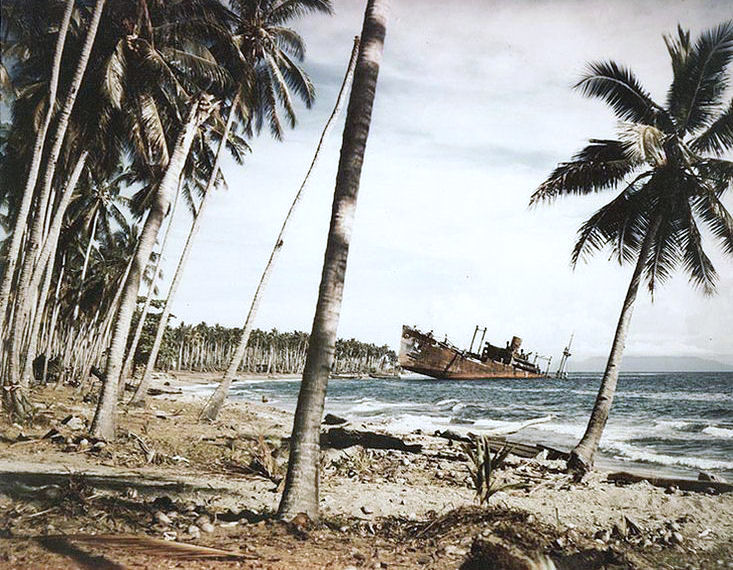
  Kinugawa Maru
- Kinugawa Maru – military transport; grounded and lost to air attack

==== Tassafaronga, 30 November 1942 ====
- Takanami – Yūgumo-class destroyer

==== Other surface battles and aerial actions, 1942–1943 ====
- Kikuzuki – Mutsuki-class destroyer; lost to U.S. Navy air attack 4 May 1942
- Tama Maru – minesweeper; lost to U.S. Navy aerial torpedo attack 4 May 1942
- Azumasan Maru – military transport; ran aground and lost to air attack 15 October 1942
- I-3 – Type J1 submarine; torpedoed by USN PT Boat 9 December 1942
- Teruzuki – Akizuki-class; torpedoed by USN PT Boat 12 December 1942
- I-1 – Type J1 submarine; rammed by RNZN ASW Corvettes, ran aground 29 January 1943
- Makigumo – Yūgumo-class destroyer; hit Mine while under attack by PT Boat 1 February 1943
- Kyūsyū Maru – military transport; attacked by the “Cactus Air Force” (later Air Sols) from Henderson Field 14 October 1942
- Sasako Maru – military transport; attacked by the “Cactus Air Force” (later Air Sols) from Henderson Field 14 October 1942. Beached and becomes a total loss. She is also known as the Sasago Maru.

=== Allied ===
==== Savo Island, 9 August 1942 ====
- Astoria – US New Orleans-class heavy cruiser
- Quincy – US New Orleans-class heavy cruiser
- Vincennes – US New Orleans-class heavy cruiser
- Canberra – Australian Kent-class heavy cruiser

==== Cape Esperance, 12 October 1942 ====
- Duncan – US Gleaves-class destroyer

==== First Naval Battle of Guadalcanal, 13 November 1942 ====
- Atlanta – US Atlanta-class light cruiser/anti-aircraft cruiser
- Barton – US Benson-class destroyer
- Cushing – US Mahan-class destroyer
- Laffey – US Benson-class destroyer
- Monssen – US Gleaves-class destroyer
- Juneau - US Atlanta-class light cruiser

==== Second Naval Battle of Guadalcanal, 15 November 1942 ====
- Preston – US Mahan-class destroyer
- Walke – US Sims-class destroyer
- Benham – US Benham-class destroyer

==== Tassafaronga, 30 November 1942 ====
- Northampton – US Northampton-class heavy cruiser

==== Operation I-Go (Air Raid on Tulagi), 7 April 1943 ====
- Kanawha – US Kanawha-class fleet oiler
- Aaron Ward – US Gleaves-class destroyer
- Moa – New Zealand Bird-class corvette

==== Other surface battles and aerial actions, 1942–1945 ====
- George F. Elliott – US Heywood-class attack transport; lost to air attack 8 August 1942
- Jarvis – US Bagley-class destroyer; sunk in aerial torpedo attack 9 August 1942 (Note: USS Jarvis was briefly involved in the Battle of Savo Island, but did not actually sink in the sound; she was lost in a separate bomber attack later that day retreating from Guadalcanal.)
- Blue – US Bagley-class destroyer; torpedoed by IJN destroyer 22 August 1942
- Colhoun – US Wickes-class destroyer; sunk in dive-bombing attack 30 August 1942
- Gregory – US Wickes-class destroyer; lost with Little in surface combat vs. IJN destroyers 5 September 1942
- Little – US Wickes-class destroyer; lost with Gregory in unnamed action vs. IJN destroyers 5 September 1942
- Seminole – US Navajo-class oceangoing tug; lost with YP-284 to gunfire of IJN destroyers 25 October 1942
- YP-284 – US Yard Patrol craft; lost with Seminole to gunfire of IJN destroyers 25 October 1942
- PT-44 – US PT boat; lost in unnamed surface action vs. IJN destroyers 12 December 1942
- PT-112 – US PT boat; lost in surface combat vs. IJN destroyers 11 January 1943
- De Haven – US Fletcher-class destroyer; lost to dive-bombing attack 1 February 1943
- PT-37 – US PT boat; sunk with PT-111 by IJN destroyer 1 February 1943
- PT-111 – US PT boat; sunk with PT-37 by IJN destroyer 1 February 1943
- PT-123 – US PT boat; lost to air attack 1 February 1943
- John Penn – US attack transport; torpedoed in air attack 13 August 1943
- Serpens – United States Coast Guard–manned Liberty ship; exploded while loading depth charges 29 January 1945

== See also ==
- List of shipwrecks of Oceania
- Shipwrecks in Ironbottom Sound
