= Japanese transport Hirokawa Maru =

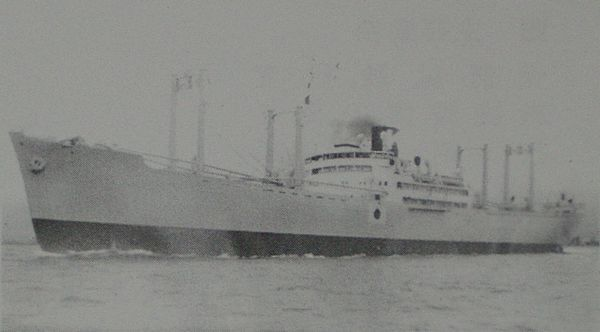
- Hirokawa Maru

History

Empire of Japan
- Name: Hirokawa Maru
- Builder: Kawasaki Dockyard, Kobe
- Laid down: April 1939
- Launched: May 1940
- Completed: October 1940
- Acquired: Requisitioned by Imperial Japanese Army, 8 February 1941
- Fate: Beached and destroyed off Guadalcanal, 15 November 1942

General characteristics
- Type: Armed transport
- Displacement: 6,872 GRT
- Length: 155 m (508 ft 6 in)
- Beam: 19 m (62 ft 4 in)
- Propulsion: Diesel engine, single screw
- Speed: 21 knots
- Armament: 6 × 75 mm AA guns; 4 × 20 mm AA guns

Hirokawa Maru was a Japanese transport laid down in 1939 for Kawasaki Kisen Kaisha and later requisitioned by the Imperial Japanese Army as an armed anti-aircraft transport. She supported several early-war operations before being beached and destroyed off Guadalcanal on 15 November 1942 during the Solomon Islands campaign. The wreck, known locally as "Bonegi 1", is a popular dive site accessible from the shore near Honiara.

== Design and construction ==
Hirokawa Maru was laid down at Kawasaki Dockyard in Kobe in April 1939 and launched in May 1940. She was built as a cargo liner, approximately 155 metres (508 ft 6 in) in length and was assesed at 6,872 gross register tons (GRT).

The Imperial Japanese Army requisitioned the ship on 8 February 1941 and converted her into an anti-aircraft transport (Boku Kikansen), fitting six 75 mm Type 88 guns and four 20 mm Type 98 cannon.

== Service history ==
=== Early operations ===
Hirokawa Maru supported Japanese deployments in Southeast Asia during 1941–42, including movements associated with the invasions of Thailand-Malaya, Sumatra and the Andaman Islands.

=== Solomon Islands campaign ===
In November 1942, Hirokawa Maru was part of a Japanese reinforcement convoy sent toward Guadalcanal via The Slot. Heavy American air attacks on 14 November destroyed most of the convoy, but Hirokawa Maru along with three other transports (Kinugawa Maru, Yamaura Maru and Yamatsuki Maru) were ordered by Admiral Kondō to beach and offload troops.

== Sinking ==
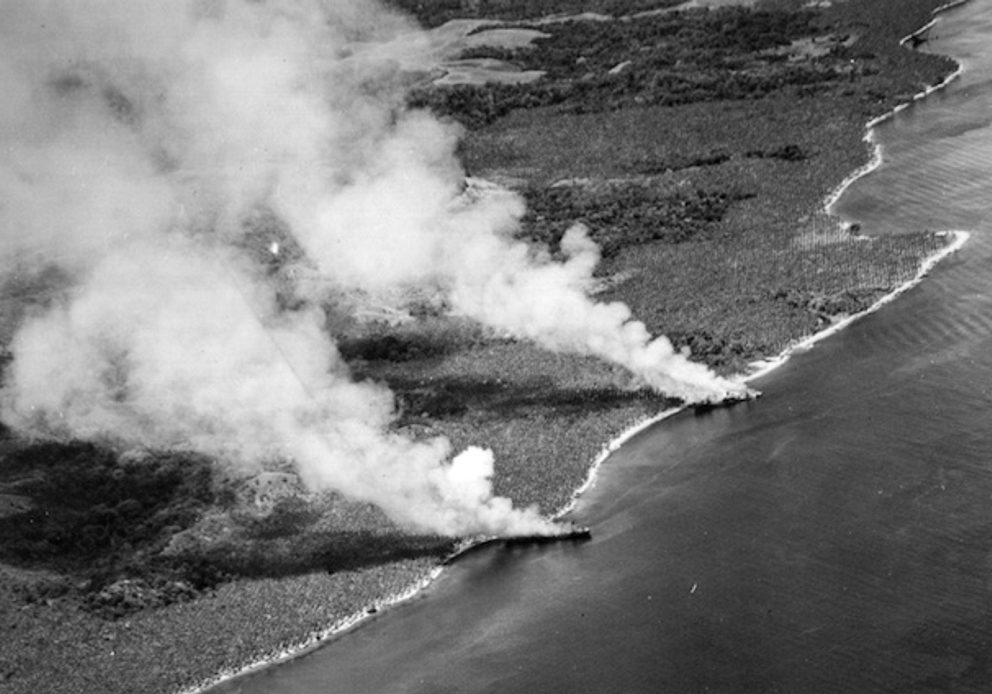
Hirokawa Maru and Kinugawa Maru beached and burning

In the early hours of 15 November 1942, Hirokawa Maru was intentionally beached near the mouth of the Bonegi River in an attempt to unload troops and supplies under darkness. While personnel reached shore, the ship remained exposed at dawn. The grounded vessel came under renewed attack and was set ablaze.

== Wreck ==
The wreck of Hirokawa Maru lies just offshore from Bonegi Beach on Guadalcanal. The bow is near the beach in shallow water, the midships section rests on its port side, and the stern lies at 55 metres (180 ft) depth.

The wreck is now covered in corals and supports a variety of marine life. The site is commonly called "Bonegi 1" by the local diving community. ("Bonegi 2" is the nearby wreck of Kinugawa Maru.)

== See also ==
- Naval Battle of Guadalcanal
- Guadalcanal campaign
- Ironbottom Sound
