= Japanese destroyer Amagiri (1930) =

Fubuki-class destroyer

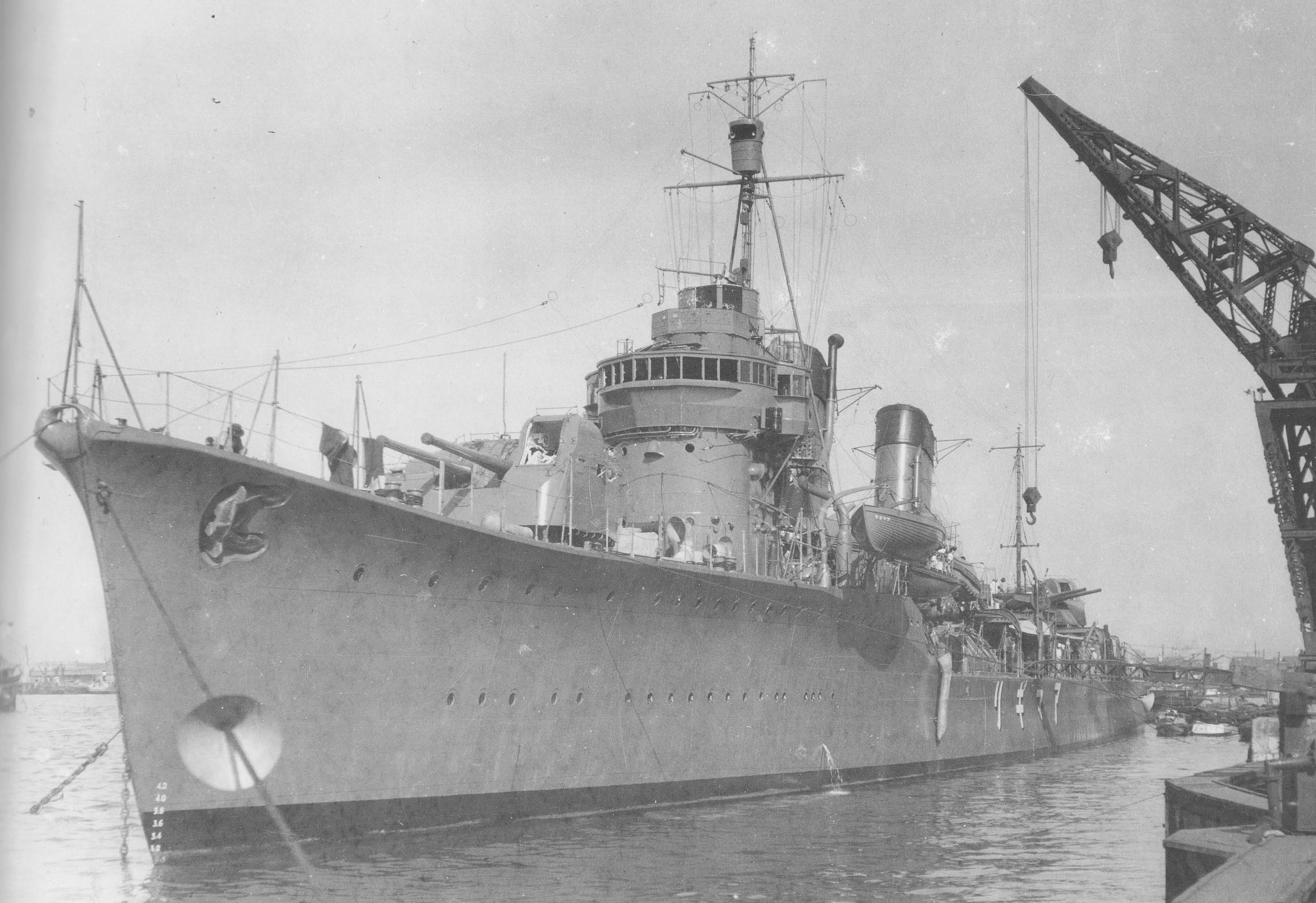
- Amagiri in November 1930

History

Empire of Japan
- Name: Amagiri
- Ordered: 1923 Fiscal Year
- Builder: Ishikawajima Shipyards
- Yard number: Destroyer No. 49
- Laid down: 28 November 1928
- Launched: 27 February 1930
- Commissioned: 10 November 1930
- Fate: Sunk, 23 April 1944

General characteristics
- Class & type: Fubuki-class destroyer
- Displacement: 1,750 long tons (1,780 t) standard; 2,050 long tons (2,080 t) re-built
- Length: 111.96 m (367.3 ft) pp; 115.3 m (378 ft) waterline; 118.41 m (388.5 ft) overall
- Beam: 10.4 m (34 ft 1 in)
- Draft: 3.2 m (10 ft 6 in)
- Propulsion: 4 × Kampon type boilers; 2 × Kampon Type Ro geared turbines; 2 × shafts at 50,000 ihp (37,000 kW)
- Speed: 38 knots (44 mph; 70 km/h)
- Range: 5,000 nmi (9,300 km) at 14 knots (26 km/h)
- Complement: 219
- Armament: 6 × Type 3 127 mm 50 caliber naval guns (3×2); up to 22 × Type 96 25 mm AT/AA Guns; up to 10 × 13 mm AA guns; 9 × 610 mm (24 in) torpedo tubes; 36 × depth charges

Service record
- Operations: Second Sino-Japanese War; Battle of Malaya; Battle of Midway; Indian Ocean raid; Solomon Islands campaign
- Victories: HMS Thanet (1919); SS Dardanus (1923); SS Gandara (1919); SS Indora (1938); USS PT-109 (1942)

Amagiri (天霧, "Fogged or Clouded Sky") was the 15th of 24 Fubuki-class destroyers, built for the Imperial Japanese Navy (IJN) following World War I. She is most famous for ramming the PT-109 commanded by Lieutenant John F. Kennedy, who would later become the 35th President of the United States.

== History ==
Construction of the advanced Fubuki-class destroyers was authorized as part of the IJN's expansion program from fiscal 1923, intended to give Japan a qualitative edge with the world's most modern ships. The Fubuki class' performance was a quantum leap over previous destroyer designs, so much so that they were designated Special Type destroyers (特型, Tokugata). Their large size, powerful engines, high speed, large radius of action, and unprecedented armament gave these destroyers the firepower similar to many light cruisers in other navies. Amagiri, built at the Ishikawajima Shipyards in Tokyo, was the fifth in an improved series, which incorporated a modified gun turret that could elevate her main battery of 127 mm (5.0 in)/50 cal Type 3 naval guns to 75° as opposed to the original 40°, thus permitting the guns to be used as dual-purpose guns against aircraft. Amagiri was laid down on 28 November 1928, launched on 27 February 1930, and commissioned on 10 November 1930. Originally assigned hull designation Destroyer No. 49, she was designated Amagiri before her launch.

== Interwar period ==
In 1935, after the Fourth Fleet Incident, in which a large number of ships were damaged by a typhoon, Amagiri, along with her sister ships, were modified with stronger hulls and increased displacement. In 1937, Amagiri covered landing of Japanese forces in Shanghai and Hangzhou during the Second Sino-Japanese War. In 1940, she was assigned to patrol and cover landings of Japanese forces in south China, and subsequently participated in the Invasion of French Indochina.

== World War II ==
=== Early operation ===
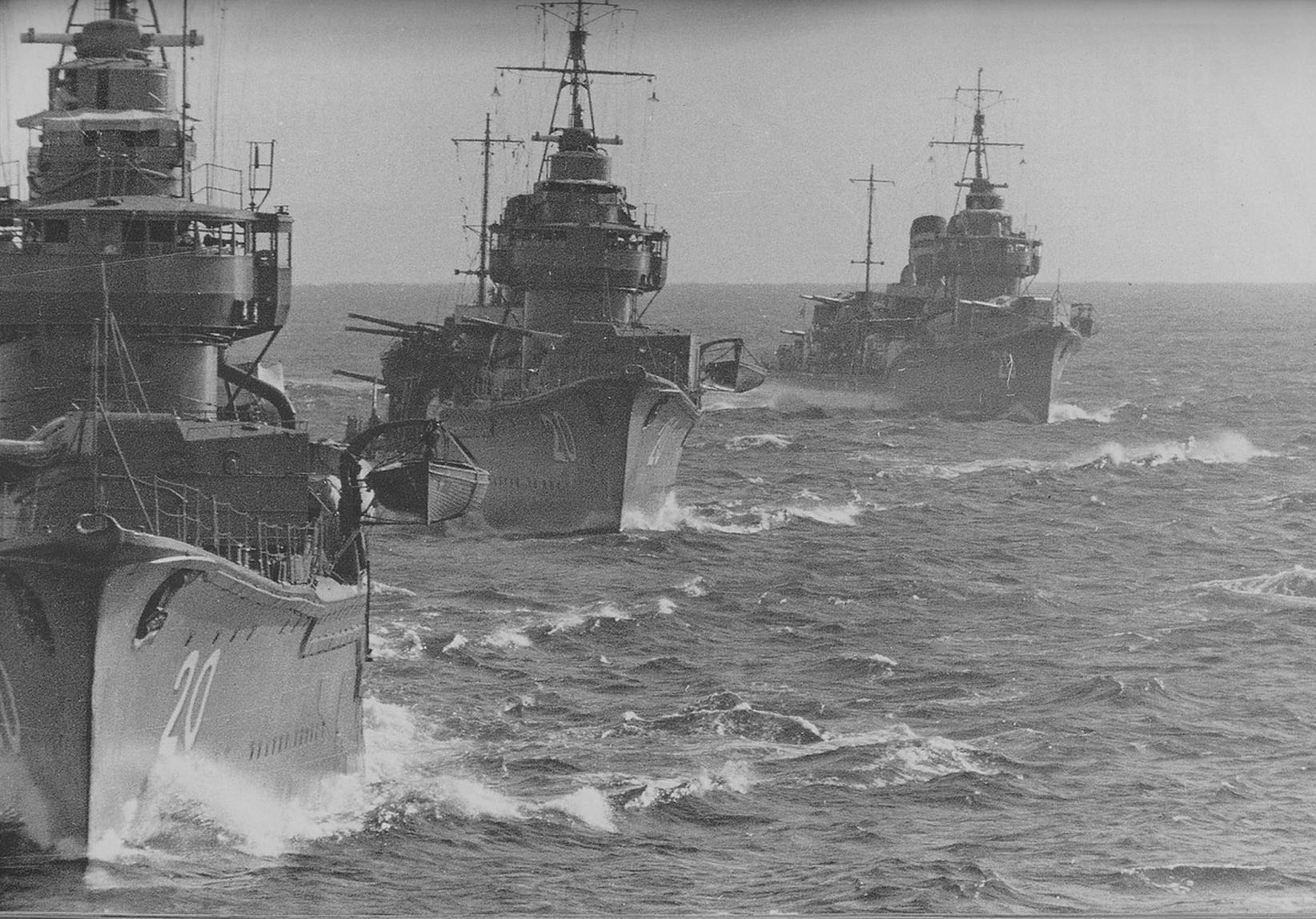
Destroyers Sagiri, Amagiri, and Asagiri of the Type II of the "Fubuki"-class in exercises: The photo was taken from the Yugiri on 16 October 1941.

At the time of the attack on Pearl Harbor, 7 December 1941, Amagiri was assigned to the 20th destroyer division (Yūgiri, Sagiri, Asagiri, Amagiri) of destroyer squadron 3 of the IJN 1st Fleet, and had deployed from Kure Naval District to the port of Samah on Hainan Island. From 4 December 1941 to the end of the year, Amagiri covered the landings of Japanese troops in Malaya and was part of the escort in support of Operation L (the invasion of Banka and Palembang in the Netherlands East Indies.

=== Battle of Endau ===
In the darkness of the early morning of 27 January 1942, Amagiri, Asagiri, and Yūgiri wERE escorting a troop convoy along with destroyer division 11, led by the light cruiser Sendai. British destroyer Thanet and Australian destroyer Vampire were tasked with intercepting the convoy, despite being outmatched by its escorts.

At 02:37, Thanet and Vampire spotted Amagiri, which did not spot them in turn. Vampire launched two torpedoes at the minesweeper W-4, neither of which hit, before firing the rest of her torpedoes at the destroyer Shirayuki, none of which hit. The pair was finally spotted at 03:38 and Thanet was hit in the engine room by a 140 mm (5.5-inch) shell from Sendai and left dead in the water. Amagiri, Asagiri, Hatsuyuki, and Fubuki all opened fire on the disabled Thanet with 127 mm (5-inch) shells, setting her on fire and causing flooding. Thanet sank by 04:15. Vampire escaped undamaged as the IJN ships escorted the convoy to Malaya.

At the end of February, Amagiri covered minesweeping operations around Singapore and Johore. In March, she was assigned to Operation T (the invasion of northern Sumatra) and Operation D (the invasion of the Andaman Islands).

On 5 April, Amagiri sailed with the heavy cruisers Mogami and Mikuma to partake in the Indian Ocean raid, a planned attack on British shipping in the Indian Ocean. The next day, the trio of IJN warships discovered the 5,281-ton cargo steamer Gandara towing the 7,726-ton cargo ship Dardanus, which had earlier been disabled by aircraft from the light carrier Ryūjō. Mogami and Mikuma opened fire and blasted both vessels with their 200 mm (8-inch) guns. Amagiri then fired a spread of nine torpedoes and sank both ships. With gunfire, Amagiri later assisted Mogami and Mikuma in sinking the 6,622-ton cargo steamer Indora, the 4,434-ton cargo ship Dragfred, and the 1,515-ton cargo ship Hermod.

From 13–22 April, Amagiri returned via Singapore and Camranh Bay to Kure Naval Arsenal for maintenance. On 4–5 June, she participated in the Battle of Midway as part of the Aleutian invasion force and was subsequently based at Amami-Ōshima for patrols of southern waters until mid-July. In July 1942, Amagiri sailed from Amami-Ōshima to Mako Guard District, Singapore, Sabang, and Mergui for a projected second Indian Ocean raid. The operation was cancelled due to the Guadalcanal campaign, and Amagiri was ordered to Truk, instead, arriving in late August.

After the Battle of the Eastern Solomons on 24 August, Amagiri took on troops from transport ships while at sea, and sailed on to Guadalcanal. During this operation, she was attacked 60 nmi (110 km; 69 mi) north-northeast of Savo Island by United States Marine Corps SBD Dauntless dive bombers from Henderson Field, which sank her sister ship Asagiri and severely damaged Shirakumo. After rescuing the Asagiri survivors, she towed Shirakumo to Shortland Island. Amagiri continued to be used on numerous "Tokyo Express" transport missions to various locations in the Solomon Islands in September.

Although reassigned to the IJN 8th Fleet in October, Amagiri continued to be used for "Tokyo Express" missions through the end of the year. After the Naval Battle of Guadalcanal from 13–15 November, she assisted destroyer Mochizuki in the rescue of 1,500 survivors of the merchant vessels Canberra Maru and Nagara Maru and escorted the damaged Sado Maru to the Shortlands. She returned to Kure Naval Arsenal for repairs by mid-January 1943.

Amagiri returned to Rabaul by March 1943, and resumed her missions as a high-speed transport. On 7 April, she was strafed by a USAAF B-17 Flying Fortress bomber, killing 10 crewmen. On 5–6 July, during the Battle of Kula Gulf, Amagiri was engaged by U.S. Navy destroyers and cruisers while attempting a troop transport mission to Kolombangara. She took five shell hits, which killed 10 crewmen. After the battle, she attempted to rescue the survivors of the destroyer Niizuki, but was driven off by the American destroyers USS Nicholas and Radford and returned to Rabaul for repairs.

=== John F. Kennedy and PT-109 ===
On 2 August, while returning from another "Tokyo Express" night-reinforcement, fast-transport mission to Vila, Amagiri rammed and sank the U.S. Navy torpedo boat PT-109, commanded by Lieutenant, junior grade (and future U.S. President) John F. Kennedy. Those aboard Amagiri are widely believed to not have been even aware of PT-109, which was difficult to see because of her small size and lack of lights. However, Robert J. Donovan in his book PT 109: John F. Kennedy in WWII, after interviewing many of the crew, concludes that it was not an accident, and he talked to the man at the wheel who was ordered to steer for a collision course. Amagiri also engaged other PT boats in the Blackett Strait south of Kolombangara. Lieutenant Commander Kohei Hanami – who commanded Amagiri at that time – gave a bronze medallion to Kennedy upon his presidential inauguration in 1961.

The incident would be publicized in several books, a movie, and a hit song by Jimmy Dean, as "the Jap destroyer in the night, cut the 109 in two", making her probably the only Japanese ship to ever be mentioned in the top 10 of the Billboard Hot 100 singles chart.

The collision with PT-109 created a dent in Amagiri's stem, which while repaired, she carried for the rest of her career.

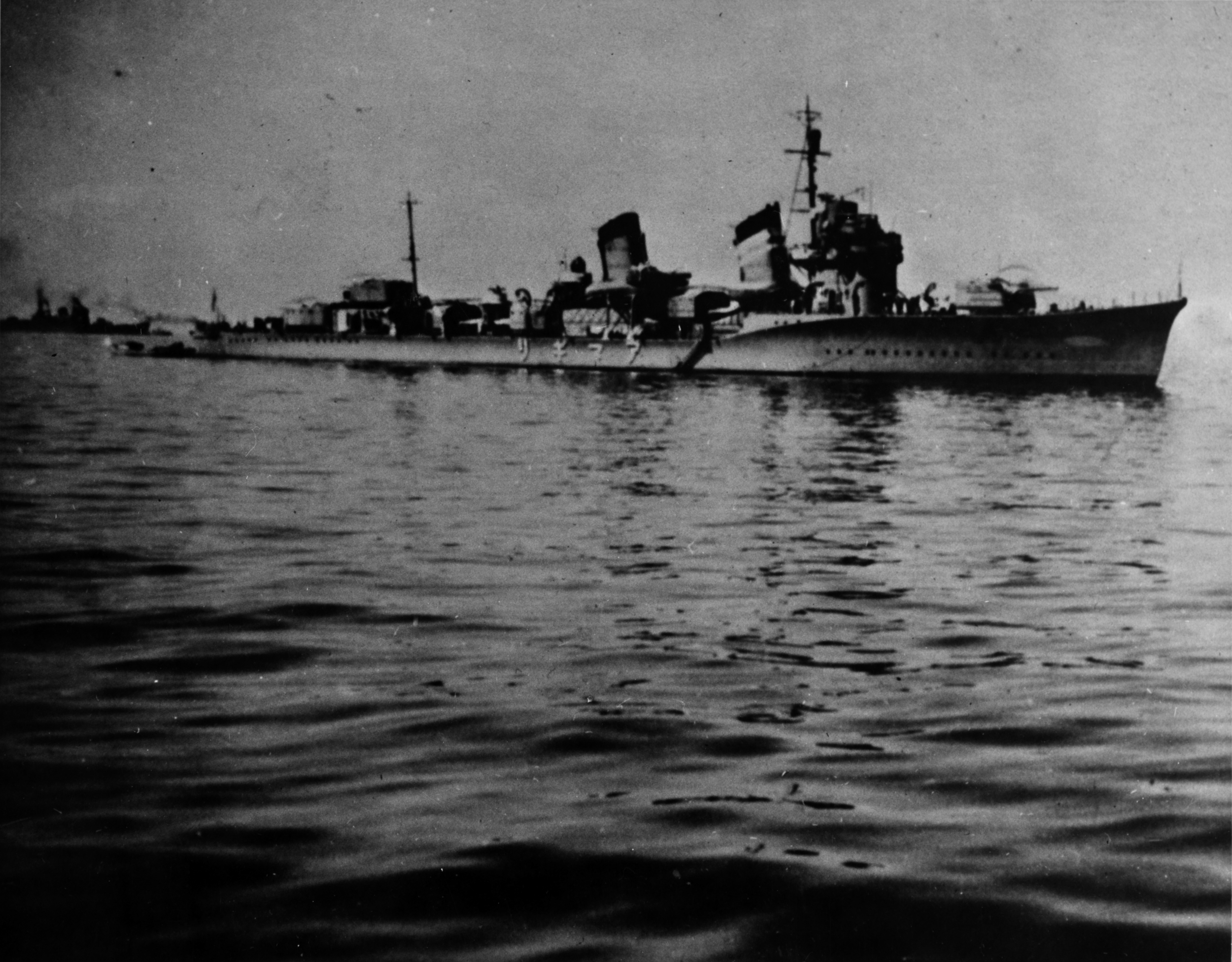
Pre-World War II USN file photo of Amagiri

=== Subsequent career ===
Amagiri continued to be used on "Tokyo Express" missions through the end of 1943. She engaged U.S. Navy destroyers in combat at the Battle of Cape St. George in late November and escaped pursuing American destroyers led by Captain Arleigh Burke. On 7 December, she collided near Kavieng with the destroyer Akikaze, which sheared off her bow. Sent back to Kure Naval Arsenal for repairs in January 1944, she was reassigned to the Southwest Area Fleet in March and was based in Singapore to provide escort for transport missions in the western Netherlands East Indies. On 23 April, after departing Singapore with heavy cruiser Aoba and light cruiser Ōi bound for Davao, Amagiri struck a naval mine in Makassar Strait 55 nmi (102 km; 63 mi) south of Balikpapan at position (02°10′S 116°45′E). As she took over 2 hours to sink, casualties were few.

Amagiri was struck from the IJN list on 10 June 1944.

=== Wreck ===
Amagiri was located in October 2003 by Vidar Skoglie and the MV Empress. She lies in 28 m (98 ft) of water on her starboard side and was heavily collapsing and split open due to apparent illegal dynamite fishing near the wreck. One dynamite fisher apparently detonated the forward magazine, as no detonation was noted during her sinking. This resulted in much of the forward part of the ship being heavily damaged. The bow of the ship was relatively intact and still sat vertically. Live torpedoes were scattered around the wreck, as were depth charges, making her a hazardous dive. Since then, the Amagiri was illegally broken up and salvaged, and little if anything remains of the wreck.
