= Battle off Endau =

Battle of the Malayan Campaign in World War II

- Part of the Battle of Malaya
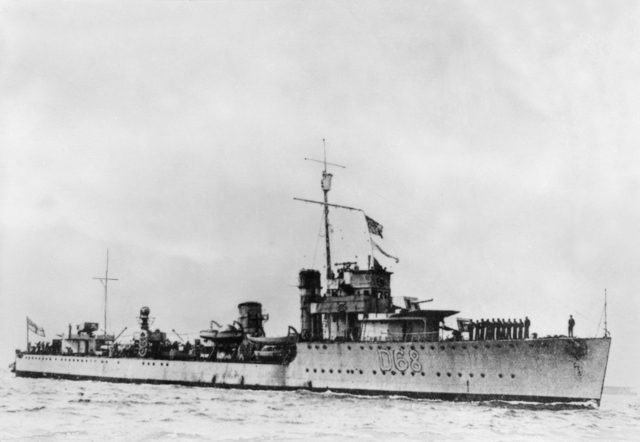
- HMAS Vampire, c. 1940, seen here before the application of wartime camouflage
Date	26–27 January 1942
Location	off Endau, then part of Malaya
Result	Japanese victory

Belligerents
Japan	United Kingdom; Australia

Commanders and leaders
Shintarō Hashimoto	(Australia) William Moran

Units involved
Naval: 1st Escort Unit; Air: 1st Air Squadron; 11th Air Squadron	Naval: (United Kingdom) Royal Navy (United Kingdom) Royal Australian Navy; Air: No. 36 Squadron RAF; No. 62 Squadron RAF; No. 100 Squadron RAF; No. 1 Squadron RAAF; No. 8 Squadron RAAF

Strength
1 light cruiser 6 destroyers 5 minesweepers 3 subchasers 4 converted patrol ships 2 troopships 2 auxiliary ships 32 fighters	2 destroyers 21 fighters 15 light bombers 22 torpedo bombers

Casualties and losses
1 aircraft lost 8 killed 18 wounded	15 aircraft lost 1 destroyer sunk 39 killed 33 captured

The Battle off Endau was a Second World War battle that took place off Endau town on 26–27 January 1942. Part of the Battle of Malaya, it was the first notable naval engagement since the sinking of the battleship Prince of Wales and the battlecruiser Repulse on 10 December 1941, and the last effort by the Royal Navy to intercept Japanese convoy shipping around the Malay Peninsula.

A Japanese convoy approaching Endau was detected by reconnaissance aircraft on 26 January and was ineffectually attacked multiple times by Allied aircraft as it was landing its troops. The Allies suffered heavy casualties, while the Japanese lost only a single aircraft. The Royal Navy committed two destroyers later that day to break up the Japanese landings, despite the much larger Japanese escort force. Sailing under the cover of darkness, they were able to locate the convoy anchored there without being detected, but could not find the troopships in the darkness. The ships attempted to disengage, but were fired upon by the convoy's escorts and one destroyer was sunk in the early morning hours of 27 January.

== Background ==
The sinking of Prince of Wales and Repulse in the opening stages of the Malayan Campaign left the task of intercepting Japanese convoys in the Gulf of Siam to the submarines of the Royal Netherlands Navy as the surface ships were occupied escorting Allied convoys to and from Ceylon and the Dutch East Indies. The Dutch recorded their first success when the troopship Awazisan Maru was sunk off Kota Bharu on 12 December 1941, probably by HNLMS K XII. On 24 December, HNLMS K XVI sank the destroyer Sagiri off the coast of Kuching in Borneo. Several other vessels were also damaged or sunk during the early weeks, but losses were high for the Dutch submarines and they could do little to stem the Japanese advance.

== Endau ==
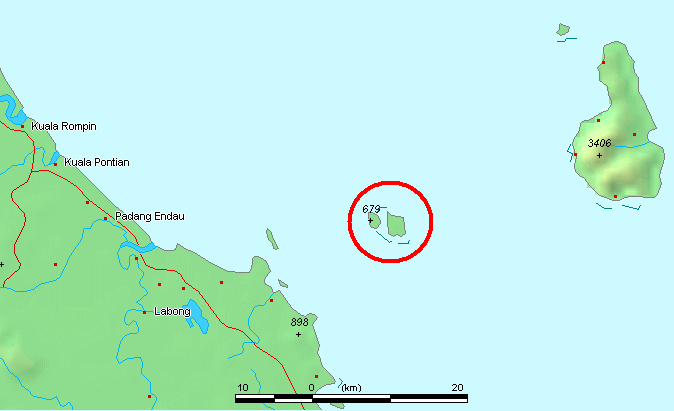
Seribuat, circled in red; Endau is at far left

An amphibious landing at Mersing was originally planned by the Japanese to sever the lines of communication between the British forces and Singapore, but the Southern Expeditionary Army Group decided to land the rest of the 18th Division at Singora instead, believing that the Allied defences at Mersing were too formidable. Although ground forces captured Endau on 21 January, they lacked the strength to break through the Australian defences at Sungei-Mersing.

On 20 January 1942, a convoy of eleven troopships departed Cam Ranh Bay in Indochina, to unload ground forces at Singora, of which two would proceed to Endau. The two transports, Kansai Maru and Canberra Maru, were carrying troops of the 96th Airfield Battalion, assigned to bring the airfields of Kahang and Kluang into operation. They were escorted by the 1st Escort Unit, which was formed around Torpedo Squadron 3, which consisted of the light cruiser Sendai, flagship of Rear-Admiral Shintarō Hashimoto, and six Fubuki-class destroyers, Fubuki, Hatsuyuki, Shirayuki, Asagiri, Amagiri, and Yūgiri. The squadron was augmented with the five W-1-class minesweepers of the 1st Minesweeper Division, three CH-4-class submarine chasers of the 11th Submarine Chaser Division, and four converted patrol boats.

=== Air attacks ===
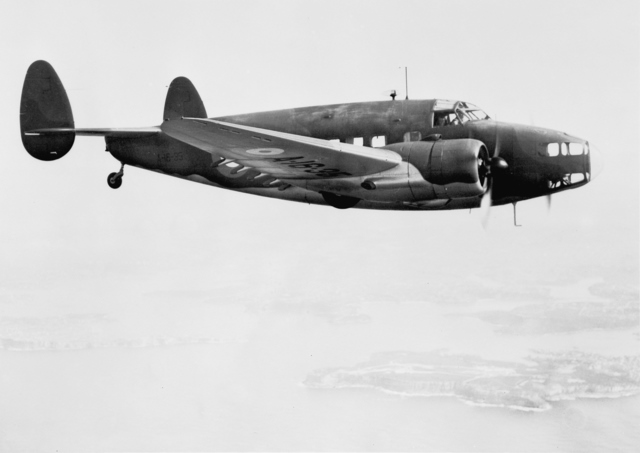
An Australian Hudson, c. 1940

Malaya Command anticipated that the Japanese force would soon be reinforced by a naval convoy, a suspicion confirmed on 26 January when two Royal Australian Air Force (RAAF) Lockheed Hudson aircraft sighted them 20 miles (32 km) north of Endau. Although they spotted the Japanese convoy at 07:45, their radio transmissions were jammed, and news did not reach higher command until they landed in Singapore at 09:20. The RAF decided to attack the convoy with all available aircraft. The attack had to be delayed until that afternoon, however, to allow the crews of the Vickers Vildebeest and Fairey Albacore torpedo bombers of No. 36 Squadron RAF and No. 100 Squadron RAF to rest after their night missions. The decision to use the elderly Vildebeest biplanes against the ships in daylight came as a shock to the pilots, who had been restricted to the relative safety of night sorties following the first day of the invasion.

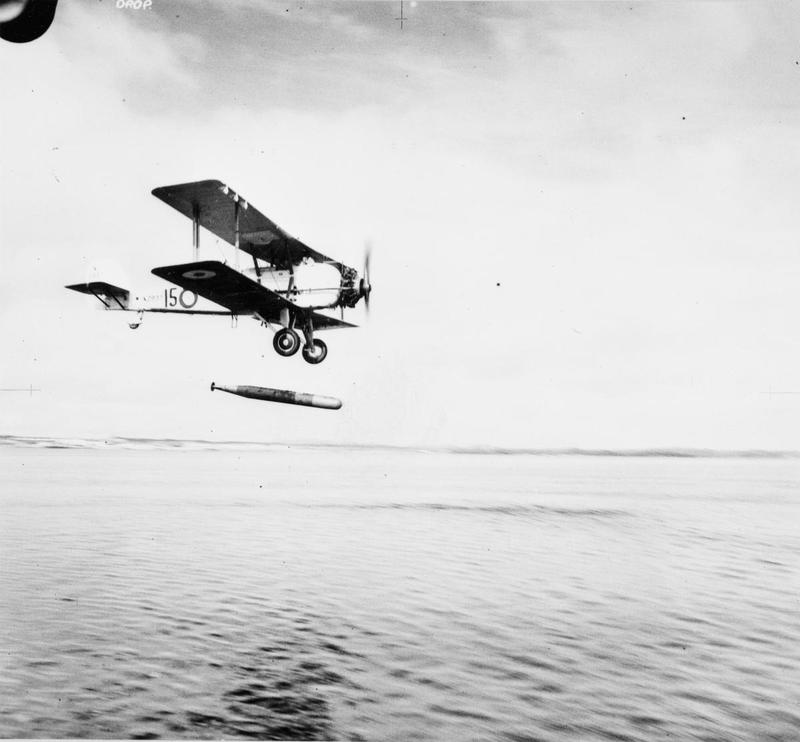
Vickers Vildebeest of No. 100 Squadron RAF making a torpedo drop during target practice, c. 1936

The first air attack was carried out by the Vildebeests of Nos. 36 and 100 Squadrons and the Hudsons of Nos. 1 and 8 Squadron RAAF. Twelve Vildebeests and nine Hudson bombers took off from Singapore in the early afternoon of 26 January, with a fighter escort composed of twelve Brewster F2A Buffalos and nine Hawker Hurricanes. The Japanese landings on Endau had been in progress for over four hours by the time the planes arrived at 15:00. The Japanese naval force had air cover consisting of 19 Nakajima Ki-27s from the 1st and 11th Squadrons and a single Nakajima Ki-44 fighter. Despite heavy opposition, the two transports were bombed, and men and equipment on the beach were strafed. Five Vildebeests were lost in the attack, including the commanding officer of No. 100 Squadron, while one Ki-27 was shot down.

A second wave set off from Singapore at 16:15, consisting of seven Vildebeests and three Albacores of No. 36 Squadron and two Vildebeests of No. 100 Squadron. They arrived over Endau at 17:30, but their escort of seven Hurricanes and four Buffalos were late and the British biplanes were set upon by ten Ki-27s and two Ki-44s before their escorts could reach them. Five Vildebeests, two Albacores and one Hurricane were lost from this wave. Of the 72 aircrew from Nos. 36 and 100 Squadrons who participated in the raids, 27 were killed, seven were wounded and two were captured. The returning pilots were congratulated by Air Vice-Marshal Paul Maltby, who promised them that further daylight attacks were unnecessary.

A third raid, consisting of six unescorted Hudsons of No. 62 Squadron RAF, flying from Palembang in Sumatra, attacked shortly afterwards, losing two of their number, with their entire crews, to six Ki-27s. A fourth raid, made up of five Bristol Blenheims of No. 27 Squadron RAF, set off from Palembang later in the day, but had only got as far as Singapore by sunset, so aborted the mission. Despite claims to have scored multiple hits on both transports and a cruiser, neither the transports, nor any of their escorts were damaged; the former were hit by splinters that killed 8 and wounded 18, but Sendai and the smaller ships were untouched.

=== Naval battle ===
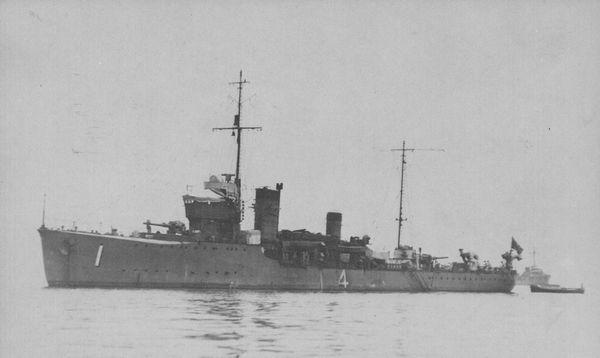
The minesweeper W-4 at anchor, July 1930

Rear-Admiral Ernest Spooner, commander of naval forces at Singapore, ordered his only combat-ready warships, the elderly destroyers HMS Thanet and HMAS Vampire, to attack the shipping off Endau later that night. Commander William Moran was captain of Vampire while Thanet was under the command of Lieutenant Commander Bernard Davies. The destroyers departed Singapore at 16:30 with Moran in charge of the two ships and headed north. Initial intelligence reports assessed the Japanese strength defending the convoy as a dozen destroyers, but this was revised downward to a pair of destroyers at 22:55, based on inaccurate reporting by surviving RAF aircrew. The 1st Escort Unit was prepared for a surface attack based on an incorrect intelligence report that two British light cruisers were at sea and Hashimoto oriented his ships' patrol sectors to the north.

Moran led his ships between the Seribuat Archipelago and the coast of Johor in brilliant moonlight and then altered course northeast to search the area north of the archipelago. When dark clouds obscured the moon at 01:51, he turned southwestwards at a speed of 15 knots (28 km/h; 17 mph) for Endau, keeping Tioman Island behind him to ensure that his ships were not silhouetted against the horizon. At 02:37, Vampire saw a Japanese destroyer (probably Amagiri), but was not spotted in return and the Allied ships continued on their course. Three minutes later, they located another Japanese ship (the minesweeper W-4) dead ahead at point-blank range. Moran decided to attack, as discovery was inevitable at such short range, and increased his speed to 25 knots (46 km/h; 29 mph), simultaneously firing two of his three torpedoes at a distance of 600 metres (660 yd). One torpedo missed ahead by 15–20 yards (14–18 m) and the other passed underneath the minesweeper. W-4, in the middle patrol zone, was trying to identify the two destroyers when Moran attacked, but failed to alert any other Japanese ships to the Allied presence in their midst for 20 minutes before giving a location six nautical miles (11 km; 6.9 mi) away. W-4 did not return fire and Moran resumed his search for the transports, reducing his speed again to 15 knots to reduce the visibility of his wakes. A half-hour later, with shallow water approaching, and no transports spotted, the Allied destroyers altered course to the north to clear the shallows and increased speed to 25 knots at 03:13 before turning southeast by east.

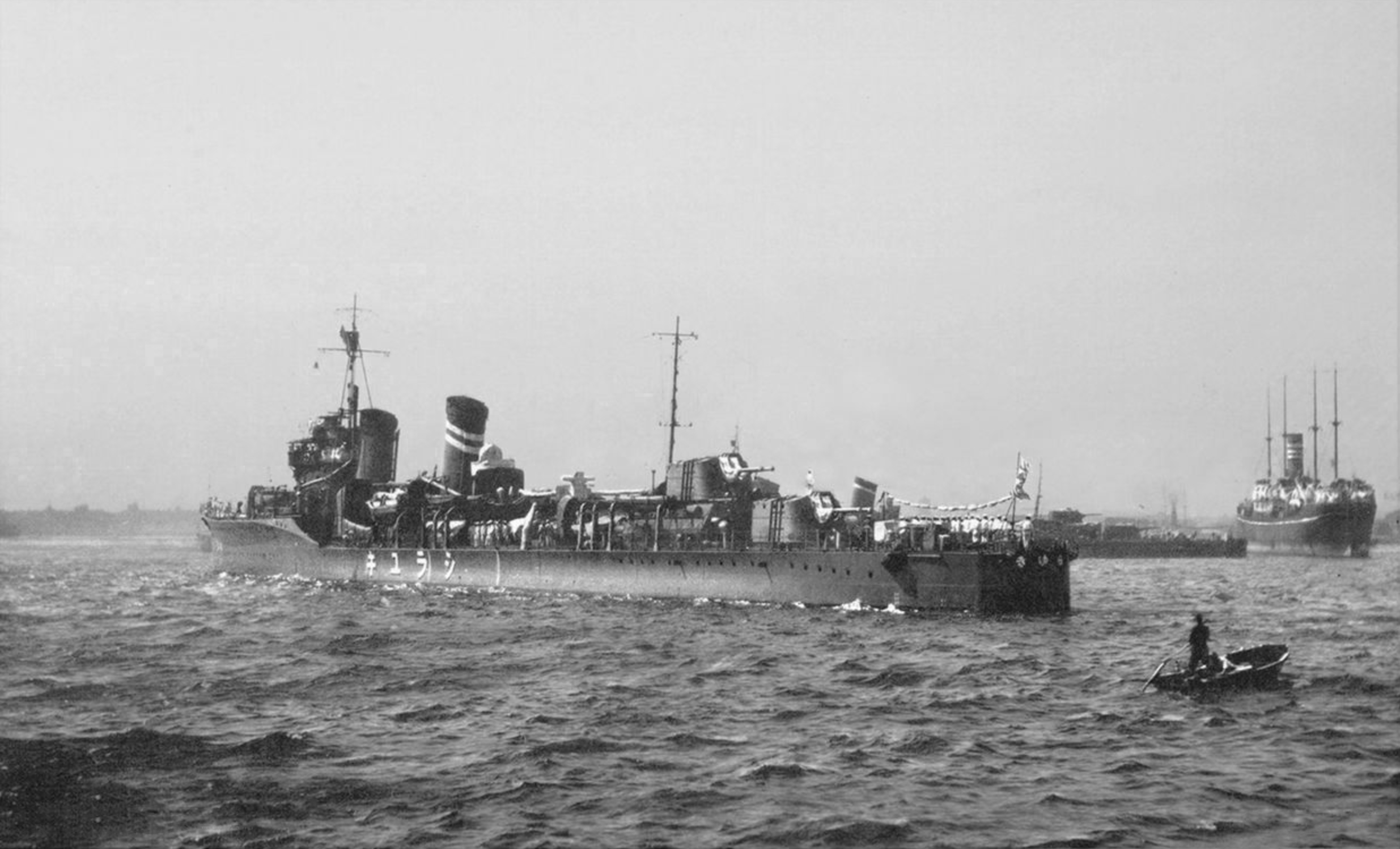
Shirayuki (foreground) and Fubuki (background) at anchor, 1931

At 03:18, Vampire sighted the destroyer Shirayuki off the port bow and another ship astern. Vampire and Thanet made minor course adjustments to fire their torpedoes at Shirayuki at a range of 1,500 yards (1,400 m) – one from Vampire and all four of Thanet's – but all missed as Shirayuki, having spotted the Allied ships at the same time, altered course to come behind the Allied destroyers and then signalled to confirm their identities. Not receiving a reply, the Japanese ship illuminated the Allied ships with her searchlight and finally opened fire at 03:31 despite the smoke screen being laid by both ships. Moran ordered both his ships to return fire with their four-inch guns while retiring southeast at maximum speed. Thanet only fired three volleys from her guns before she was hit in the engine room. The hit fractured both the main and auxiliary steam lines to the engines, causing the ship to go dead in the water and lose all electrical power. Constantly making small changes of course to throw off Japanese gun layers, neither ship hit any Japanese ships during the battle.

Allied and Japanese accounts of the gunnery action are difficult to reconcile, particularly as neither of the Allied destroyers recorded any times after firing their torpedoes at 03:18. Shirayuki fired 18 rounds at Vampire at a range of 4,500 yards (4,100 m) before the muzzle blast from her rear gun mounts tripped the circuit breakers in her main electrical switchboard, causing complete electrical failure throughout the ship. While electrical service was restored within two minutes, the ship had a series of smaller electrical failures that bedeviled her for the next 15 minutes. When she resumed firing, Vampire was no longer visible and Shirayuki targeted Thanet instead at a range of 3,050 metres (10,010 ft), firing 82 rounds at her. Yugiri opened fire at 03:38 at Thanet 4,500 yards (4,100 m) away and both ships observed their target slowing down at 03:45. At that same time, Yugiri radioed Hashimoto that "The enemy is two destroyers" so she had spotted Vampire as she fled, although Yugiri lost sight of Vampire 10 minutes later. Sendai, Fubuki, Asagiri, Amagiri, Hatsuyuki and W-1 all subsequently opened fire, mostly at Thanet, although Vampire reported being under fire for a considerable time. All told, the Japanese ships fired 469 rounds at the Allied destroyers, failing to hit Vampire even once. Shirayuki reported that Thanet had sunk at 04:18 and rescued an officer and 30 ratings from the water; another officer and 11 ratings died in the battle. The Japanese did not pursue and Vampire reached Singapore at 10:00 that morning.

== Aftermath ==
Shirayuki handed over the rescued seamen to troops on Endau the following day. They were never seen again, but are believed to have been executed in retaliation for losses sustained by the Japanese in an ambush by the Australian 2/18th Battalion, which occurred south of Mersing about the same time as the naval action off Endau. Davies, four other officers, and 61 ratings from Thanet managed to reach shore and made their way to Singapore, together with shot down aircrew.

The Japanese were able to finish landing their troops, which may have contributed to the impression of significant forces in front of the Australian defenders and their subsequent withdrawal. The heavy losses suffered by the Allied aircraft and aircrew virtually eliminated their ability to influence the subsequent ground battles. Moran's report on Japanese incompetence at night fighting was the most important result of the battle. Since few details about the subsequent night combats off Java survived, Moran's assessment influenced Allied thinking about the IJN until the stunning victory during the nighttime Battle of Savo Island in August flipped the Allied beliefs about the Japanese ability at night fighting on their heads.

== Bibliography ==
- Cannon, Peter (2014). "Night Action, Malaya 1942". In Jordan, John (ed.). Warship 2015. London: Conway. pp. 62–80. ISBN 978-1-84486-276-4.
- Dull, Paul S (2007). A Battle History of the Imperial Japanese Navy, 1941–1945. Annapolis, Maryland: Naval Institute Press. ISBN 978-1-59114-219-5.
- Gill, G. Hermon (1957). "Chapter 14: South-West Pacific Area". Australia in the War of 1939–1945: Series Two Navy: Volume I: The Royal Australian Navy, 1939–1942. Canberra, Australia: Australian War Memorial. pp. 484–512. OCLC 848228.
- Rohwer, Jürgen (2005). Chronology of the War at Sea 1939–1945: The Naval History of World War Two (Third Revised ed.). Annapolis, Maryland: Naval Institute Press. ISBN 1-59114-119-2.
- Shores, Christopher; Cull, Brian; Izawa, Yasuho (1992). Bloody Shambles: Volume One: The Drift to War to the Fall of Singapore. London: Grub Street. ISBN 0-948817-50-X.
- Shores, Christopher; Cull, Brian; Izawa, Yasuho (1993). Bloody Shambles: Volume Two: The Defence of Sumatra to the Fall of Burma. London: Grub Street. ISBN 0-948817-67-4.
- Warren, Alan (2007). Britain's Greatest Defeat: Singapore 1942. London: Hambleton Continuum. ISBN 978-1-85285-597-0.
- Wigmore, Lionel Gage (1957). "Chapter 13: To Singapore Island". Australia in the War of 1939–1945: Series One Army: Volume IV: The Japanese Thrust. Canberra, Australia: Australian War Memorial. pp. 250–283.
