= Japanese cruiser Mogami (1934) =

Lead ship of the Mogami-class of cruisers

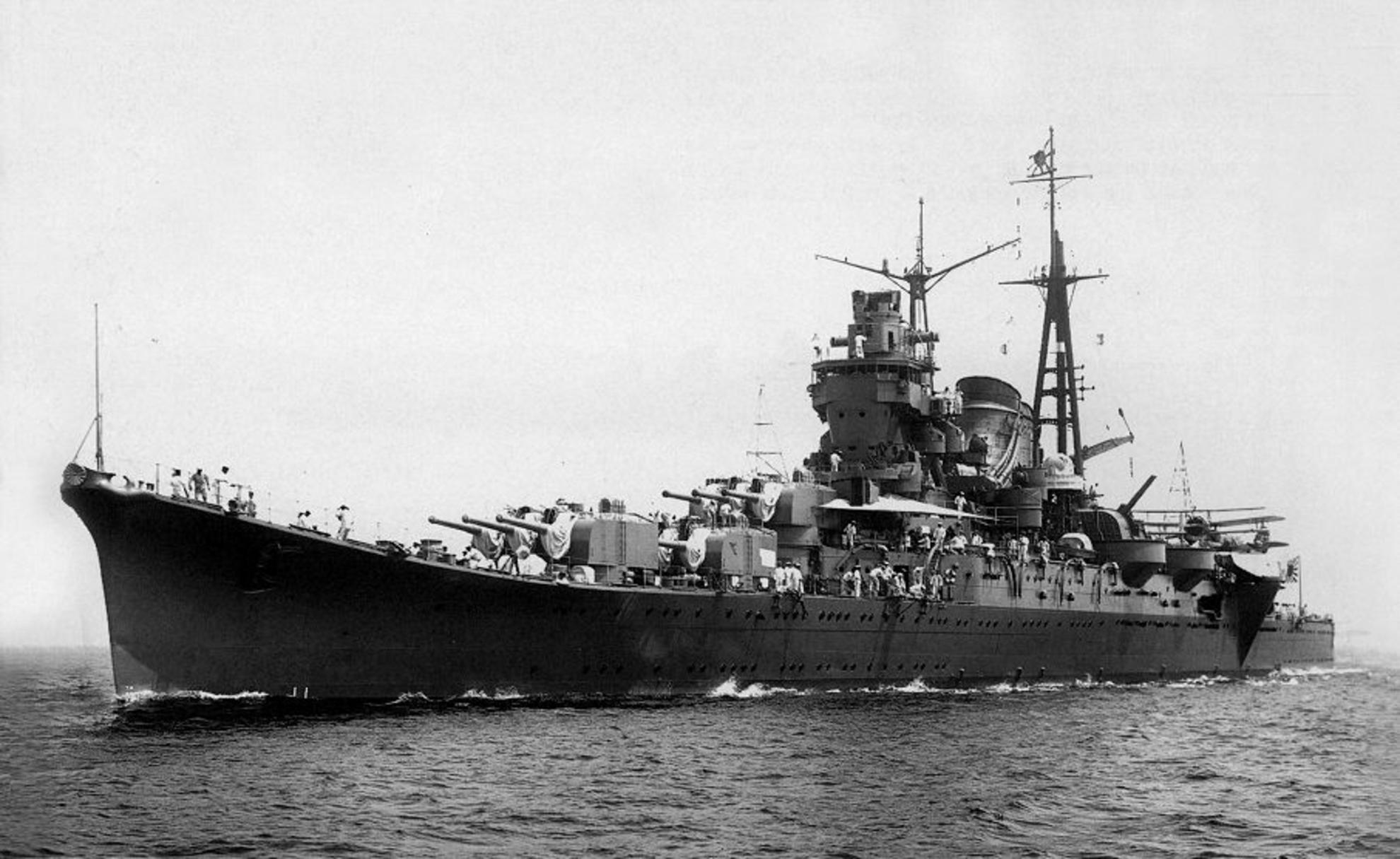
- Mogami in July 1935, shortly after commissioning

History

Empire of Japan
- Name: Mogami
- Namesake: Mogami River
- Ordered: 1931 Fiscal Year
- Builder: Kure Naval Arsenal
- Laid down: 27 October 1931
- Launched: 14 March 1934
- Commissioned: 28 July 1935
- Stricken: 20 December 1944
- Fate: Scuttled, 25 October 1944, after Battle of the Surigao Strait

General characteristics
- Class & type: Mogami-class cruiser
- Displacement: 8,500 tons (official, initial); 13,670 tons (final)
- Length: 197 metres (646 ft) (initial); 198 metres (650 ft) (final)
- Beam: 18 metres (59 ft) (initial); 20.2 metres (66 ft) (final)
- Draught: 5.5 metres (18 ft) (initial); 5.89 metres (19.3 ft) (final)
- Propulsion: 4-shaft geared turbines; 10 Kampon boilers; 152,000 shp (113,000 kW)
- Speed: 37-knot (69 km/h) (initial); 35.5 knots (65.7 km/h) (final)
- Range: 8,000 nmi (15,000 km) at 14 knots (26 km/h)
- Complement: 850
- Armament: (initial); 15 × 15.5 cm/60 3rd Year Type naval gun (5×3); 8 × 12.7 cm/40 Type 89 naval guns (4×2); 4 × 40 mm (1.6 in) AA guns; 12 × Type 93 torpedoes (4 × 3 tube rotating launchers + 12 reloads); (final); 6 × 20 cm/50 3rd Year Type naval guns (3x2); 8 × 12.7 cm/40 Type 89 naval gun (4×2); 30 × Type 96 25 mm AT/AA Gun guns; 12 × Type 93 torpedoes (4 × 3 tube rotating launchers + 12 reloads)
- Armor: Belt 100–125 mm (3.9–4.9 in); Deck 35–60 mm (1.4–2.4 in); Turret 25 mm (0.98 in)
- Aircraft carried: (initial) 3 x Kawanishi E7K floatplanes, replaced by Mitsubishi F1M & Aichi E13A from 1941; (final) 11 floatplanes; 3 x Mitsubishi F1M, 8 x Aichi E13A

Mogami (Japanese: 最上; named after Mogami River) was the lead ship in the four-vessel Mogami class of heavy cruisers in the Imperial Japanese Navy. The Mogami-class ships were constructed as "light cruisers" (per the London Naval Treaty) with five triple 155-millimetre (6.1 in) dual-purpose guns. They were exceptionally large for light cruisers, and the barbettes for the main battery were designed for quick refitting with twin 8-inch (203 mm) guns. In 1937, all four ships were converted to heavy cruisers in this fashion. Mogami served in numerous combat engagements in World War II, until she was sunk at the Battle of Leyte Gulf in October 1944.

== Background and design ==
Built under the Maru-1 Naval Armaments Supplement Programme, the Mogami-class cruisers were designed to the maximum limits allowed by the Washington Naval Treaty, using the latest technology. This resulted in the choice of the dual-purpose 15.5 cm/60 3rd Year Type naval guns as the main battery in five triple turrets capable of 55° elevation. These were the first Japanese cruisers with triple turrets. Secondary armament included eight 12.7 cm/40 Type 89 naval guns in four twin turrets, and 24 Type 93 Long Lance torpedoes in four rotating triple mounts.

To save weight, electric welding was used, as was aluminum in the superstructure and a single funnel stack. New geared impulse turbine engines, driving four shafts with three-bladed propellers gave a top speed of 35 knots (65 km/h; 40 mph), which was better than most contemporary cruiser designs and the Mogami class had twin balanced rudders, rather than the single rudder of previous Japanese cruiser designs.

The class was designed from the start to be upgraded into heavy cruisers with the replacement of their main battery with 20 cm/50 3rd Year Type naval guns in twin turrets.

In initial trials in 1935, though, Mogami and Mikuma were plagued with technical problems due to untested equipment and welding defects and also proved to be top-heavy with stability problems in heavy weather. Both vessels, and their yet-to-be-completed sisters, Kumano and Suzuya underwent a complete and very costly rebuilding program. Once rebuilt, the design, with its very high speed, armor protection, and heavy armament was among the best in the world during World War II.

== Service career ==
=== Early career ===
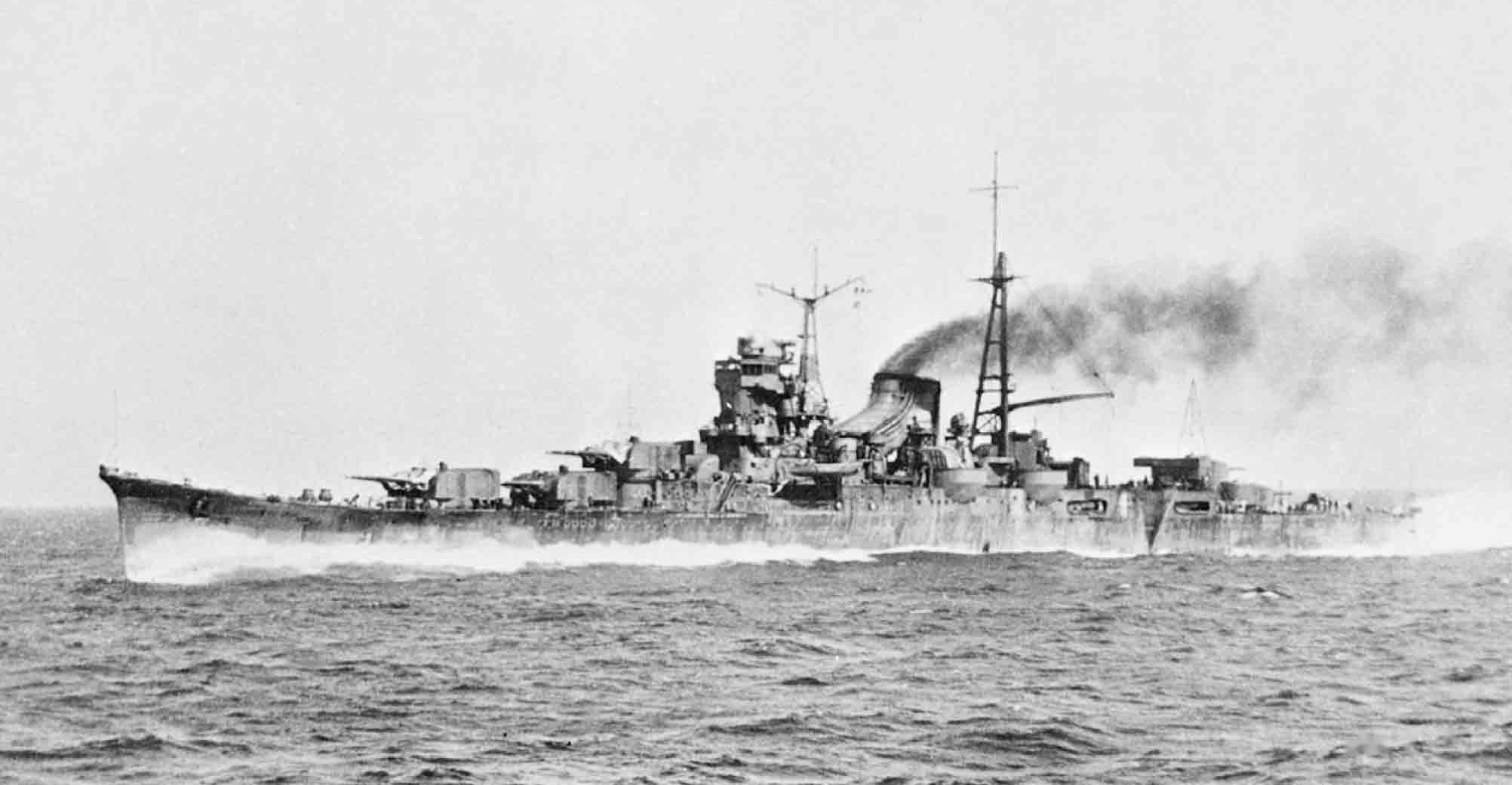
Mogami running trials in 1935

Mogami was laid down on 27 October 1931, launched on 14 March 1934, and completed at Kure Naval Arsenal on 28 July 1935. Following the Japanese ship-naming conventions, the ship was named after the Mogami River in Tōhoku region of Japan. Her first captain was Captain Tomoshige Samejima, formerly captain of the cruiser Kitakami, who oversaw her completion and remained captain until November 1935. He was followed by Captain Seiichi Itō until April 1936. Mogami was commanded by Captain Shunji Isaki from November 1939 to January 1941.

Mogami was damaged in a 1935 typhoon as part of the Fourth Fleet incident. In mid-1941, Mogami participated in the occupation of Cochinchina, French Indochina, from its forward operating base on Hainan after Japan and Vichy French authorities reached an understanding on use of air facilities and harbors from July 1941. At the time of the attack on Pearl Harbor, Mogami was assigned to cover the Japanese invasion of Malaya as part of Cruiser Division 7 under Vice Admiral Jisaburo Ozawa's First Southern Expeditionary Fleet, providing close support for landings of Japanese troops at Singora, Pattani, and Kota Bharu. In December 1941, Mogami was tasked with the invasion of Sarawak, together with Mikuma, covering landings of Japanese troops at Kuching. In February 1942, Mogami was assigned to cover the landings of Japanese troops in Java, Borneo, and Sumatra. On 10 February, Mogami and Chōkai were attacked by the submarine USS Searaven, which fired four torpedoes, all of which missed.

=== The Battle of Sunda Strait ===
At 2300 on 28 February 1942, Mikuma and Mogami, destroyer Shikinami, light cruiser Natori, and destroyers Shirakumo, Murakumo, Shirayuki, Hatsuyuki, and Asakaze engaged the cruisers USS Houston and HMAS Perth with gunfire and torpedoes after the Allied vessels attacked Japanese transports in the Sunda Strait. Both Houston and Perth were sunk during the engagement, as was Japanese transport Ryūjō Maru with IJA 16th Army commander Lieutenant General Hitoshi Imamura aboard.

In March, Mogami and Cruiser Division 7 were based out of Singapore to cover Japanese landings on the Bangka Island off of Sumatra and the seizure of the Andaman Islands.

=== Indian Ocean raids ===
From 1 April 1942, Cruiser Division 7 based from Mergui, Burma, joined with Cruiser Division 4 to participate in the Indian Ocean raids against Allied shipping. Mikuma, Mogami, and destroyer Amagiri detached and formed the "Southern Group", which hunted for merchant shipping in the Bay of Bengal, while Chōkai, Destroyer Squadron 4's light cruiser Yura, and the destroyers Ayanami, Yūgiri, Asagiri, and Shiokaze covered the northern areas. During the operation, the "Southern Group" claimed kills on the 7,726-ton British passenger ship Dardanus, the 5,281-ton British steamship Ganara, and the 6,622-ton British merchant vessel Indora, en route from Calcutta to Mauritius.

On 22 April, Cruiser Division 7 returned to Kure, and Mogami went into dry dock for overhaul. On 26 May, Cruiser Division 7 arrived at Guam to provide close support for Rear Admiral Raizō Tanaka's Midway Invasion Transport Group.

=== Battle of Midway ===
On 5 June, Admiral Isoroku Yamamoto, CINC of the Combined Fleet ordered Cruiser Division 7 to shell Midway Island in preparation for a Japanese landing. Cruiser Division 7 and DesDiv 8 were 410 miles (660 km) away from the island, so they made a high-speed dash at 35 knots (65 km/h). The sea was choppy and the destroyers lagged behind. At 2120, the order was canceled. However, this dash placed Cruiser Division 7 within torpedo range of the submarine USS Tambor, which was spotted by Kumano, which signaled a 45° simultaneous turn to port to avoid possible torpedoes. The emergency turn was correctly executed by the flagship and Suzuya, but the third ship in the line, Mikuma, erroneously made a 90° turn. Behind her, Mogami turned 45° as commanded. This resulted in a collision in which Mogami rammed Mikuma's portside, below the bridge. Mogami's bow caved in and she was badly damaged. Mikuma's portside oil tanks ruptured and she began to spill oil, but otherwise her damage was slight. Arashio and Asashio were ordered to stay behind and escort Mogami and Mikuma. At 0534, retiring Mikuma and Mogami were bombed from high altitude by eight USAAF Boeing B-17 Flying Fortresses from Midway, but they scored no hits. At 0805, six USMC Douglas SBD Dauntless dive bombers and six Vought SB2U Vindicators from Midway attacked Mikuma and Mogami, but they only achieved several near misses.

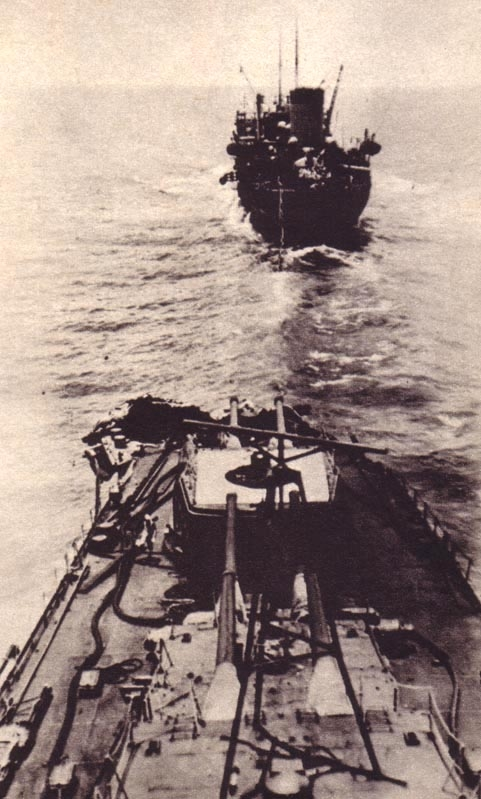
Bridge view of Mogami's damaged bow, following her collision with Mikuma at Midway: The tanker Nichiei Maru is seen ahead.

The following morning, 6 June 1942, Mikuma and Mogami were heading for Wake Island when they were attacked by three waves of 31 SBD Dauntless dive bombers from the aircraft carriers USS Enterprise and Hornet. Mikuma was hit by at least five bombs and set afire. Her torpedoes ignited and the resultant explosions destroyed the ship. Arashio and Asashio were each hit by a bomb. Mogami was hit by six bombs. Her No. 5 turret was destroyed and 81 crewmen were killed. However, Lieutenant Commander Masayushi Saruwatari had jettisoned torpedoes and other explosives, which made saving the cruiser easier when it was hit by a bomb near the torpedo tubes.

=== Respite in Japan ===
Mogami rejoined Cruiser Division 7 on 8 June and was repaired at Truk. On 20 June, Rear Admiral Shoji Nishimura assumed command of Cruiser Division 7, which was transferred to the Third Fleet. Mogami returned to Japan and underwent a major conversion at Sasebo Naval Arsenal from 25 August to an aircraft cruiser to improve the fleet's reconnaissance capabilities. Her No. 4 turret and the damaged No. 5 turret were removed and her aft magazines modified to serve as gasoline tanks and munitions storage. Her aft deck was extended and fitted with a rail system to accommodate the planned stowage of 11 Aichi E16A Zuiun ("Paul") reconnaissance floatplanes. The dual Type 96 25 mm AT/AA gun and Type 93 13-mm machine guns were replaced by 10 triple-mount Type 96s and a Type 21 air-search radar. As the new E16A aircraft were not yet available, three older Mitsubishi F1M2 Type 0 ("Pete") two-seat biplanes and four Aichi E13A1 Type O ("Jake") three-seat reconnaissance floatplanes were embarked. Rebuilding was completed on 30 April 1943, and Mogami was recommissioned into the First Fleet. .

On 22 May, Mogami collided with oiler Toa Maru in Tokyo Bay and was damaged slightly. On 8 June, while at Hashirajima, Mogami was moored near the battleship Mutsu when the latter exploded and sank. Mogami sent boats to rescue survivors, but they found none.

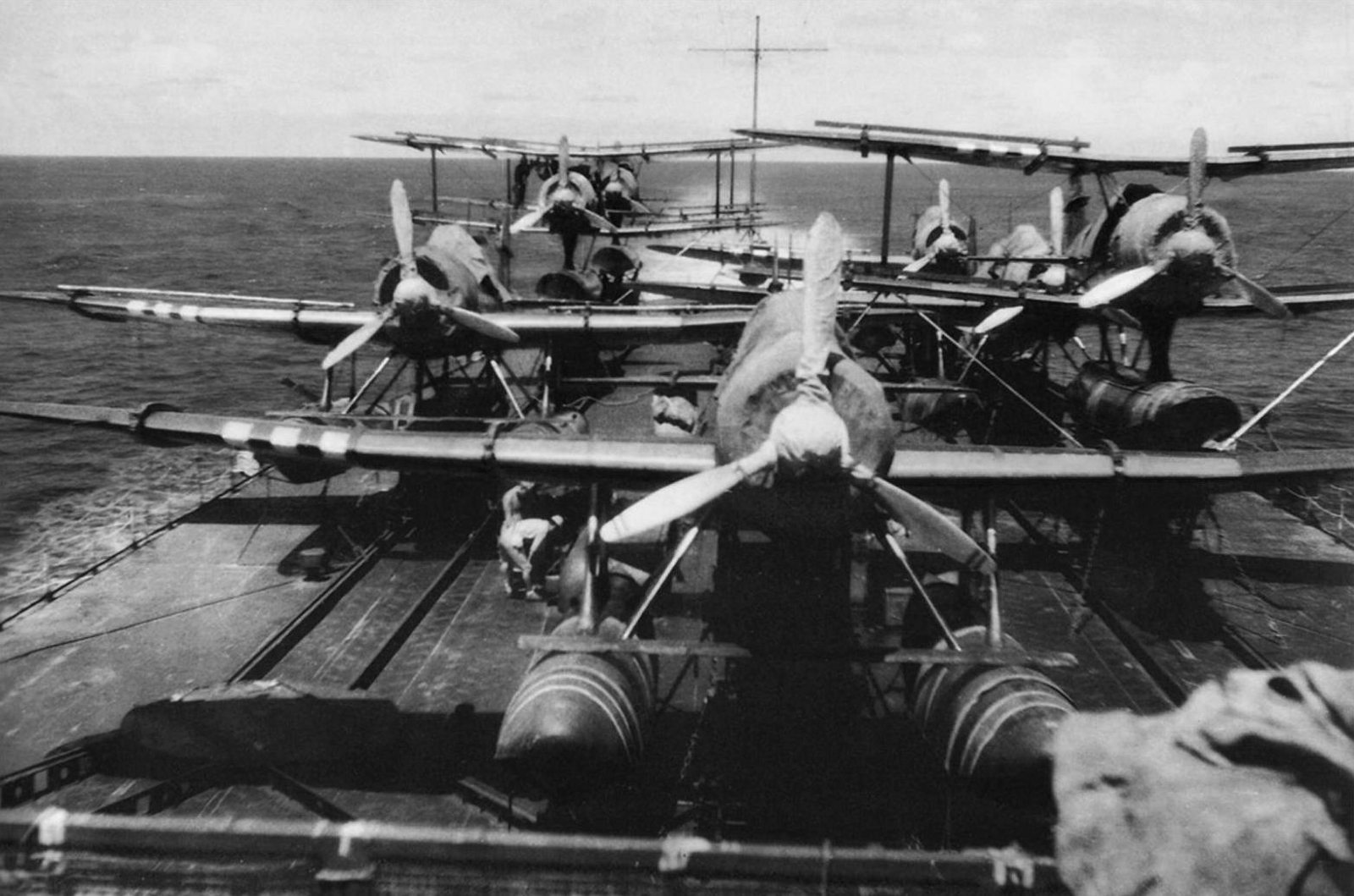
Japanese planes onboard Mogami's newly installed flight deck

On 9 July 1943, Mogami departed Japan for Truk, with a major convoy of troops and supplies; the task force was unsuccessfully attacked by the submarine USS Tinosa, and after reaching Truk, continued on to Rabaul.

From August through November, Mogami made numerous sorties from its base at Truk in search of the American fleet and in response to American probing attacks into the Marshall Islands. From 3 November, Cruiser Divisions 4, 7, and 8 were assigned to the Solomon Islands front to attack American forces off Bougainville. While at anchor at Rabaul on 5 November, Mogami was attacked by an SBD Dauntless dive bomber from the aircraft carrier USS Saratoga and hit by a 500 lb (227 kg) bomb. She was set on fire and 19 crewmen were killed.

After repairs at Truk by the repair vessel Akashi, Mogami was ordered back to Japan. While at Kure from 22 December, eight more Type 96 single-mount 25-mm AA guns were installed on the aft deck, bringing the total to 38 barrels. Refit was completed by 8 March 1944, and Mogami returned to Singapore a week later.

=== Battle of the Philippine Sea ===
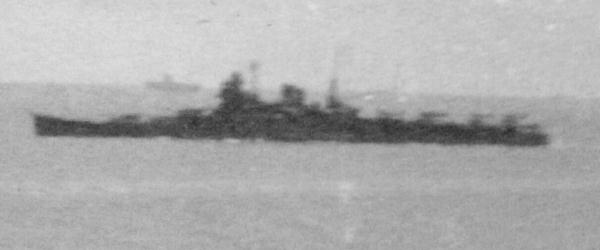
Mogami in 1944, after conversion into an aircraft cruiser

On 13 June 1944, Admiral Soemu Toyoda, CINC, Combined Fleet, activated the "A-Go" plan for the defense of the Mariana Islands. Mogami was assigned to Rear Admiral Takatsugu Jojima's "Force B" with the carriers Jun'yō, Hiyō, and Ryūhō and battleship Nagato, deployed behind Vice Admiral Kurita's "Vanguard Force C".

At 0530 on 19 June, Mogami launched two reconnaissance floatplanes. Later in the day, the Mobile Fleet's aircraft attacked Task Force 58 off Saipan, but suffered overwhelming losses in the "Great Marianas Turkey Shoot". At 2030 on 20 June, two hours after Hiyō was hit by torpedoes by Grumman TBM Avengers from the aircraft carrier USS Belleau Wood, she exploded and sank. That night, Mogami retired with the remnants of the Japanese fleet to Okinawa, and from there to Hashirajima.

Back in Kure on 25 June 1944, Mogami was refitted once again. Four triple-mount and 10 single-mount Type 96 25-mm AA guns were installed, bringing the total to 60 barrels (14×3 and 18×1) and a Type 22 surface search radar and Type 13 air-search radar were fitted. On 8 July, Mogami departed Kure via Okinawa and Manila back for Singapore and Brunei, and was involved in fleet training and patrols in the Singapore-Brunei area through October.

=== Battle of Leyte Gulf ===
In late October, the Japanese fleet assembled in Brunei in response to the threatened American invasion of the Philippines. On the morning of 24 October 1944, Vice Admiral Nishimura ordered the launch of Mogami's floatplane to reconnoiter Leyte Gulf. The plane reported sighting four battleships, two cruisers, and about 80 transports off the landing area and four destroyers and several torpedo boats near Surigao Strait. In addition, the scout reported 12 carriers and 10 destroyers 40 miles (64 km) southeast of Leyte. The Japanese task force was attacked in the Sulu Sea by 27 aircraft from the carriers Enterprise and Franklin. Mogami was damaged slightly by strafing and rockets.

=== Battle of Surigao Strait ===
On 25 October, between 0300 and 0330, the Japanese force was attacked by American PT boats and destroyers. Battleships Fusō and Yamashiro were hit by torpedoes. The destroyer Yamagumo was sunk, and the destroyer Michishio disabled, but Mogami was not hit. Fusō and Yamashiro both later sank. Between 0350 and 0402 hours on 25 October, after entering the Surigao Strait, Mogami was struck by four 8-inch (203 mm) shells from the heavy cruiser USS Portland, which destroyed both the bridge and the air defense center. Both the captain and executive officer were killed on the bridge, and the chief gunnery officer assumed command. At 0425, Admiral Shima, leading the Second Strike Force about 40 miles behind, ordered a retreat. While attempting to retire southward, the flagship of Admiral Shima, Nachi, collided with Mogami. Nachi's bow was damaged and she began to flood. Mogami was holed starboard above the waterline, but fires ignited five torpedoes that exploded and disabled her starboard engine. Although crippled, she was still able to make 18 knots and followed Admiral Shima's force to try to retire, instead. Between 0530 and 0535, the crippled Mogami was hit again by 10 to 20 6-inch (152 mm) and 8-inch (203 mm) shells from the cruisers Portland, Louisville, and Denver. A PT boat narrowly missed her with torpedoes. At 0545, a PT boat reported her position and that she was moving southwards at around 12-14 knots. This report enabled US planes, trailing Shima, to catch the crippled Mogami at 0810; their attack immobilized her and she became dead in the water. At 0830, Mogami's port engine broke down. At 0902, while adrift, she was attacked by 17 TBF Avenger torpedo bombers from Task Group 77.4.1 and was hit by two 500-pound (227 kg) bombs.

At 1047, Mogami's crew abandoned ship, and she stayed afloat for the next two hours. At 1130, the destroyer Akebono scuttled her with a single Type 93 "Long Lance" torpedo. She finally sank at 1307, at 09°40′N 124°50′E. Akebono rescued 700 survivors, but 196 crewmen perished with the ship.

Mogami was removed from the Navy List on 20 December 1944.

== Wreck ==
The wreck of Mogami was located by RV Petrel on 8 May 2019 at a depth of 1,450 m (4,760 ft).
