= Japanese destroyer Asagiri (1929) =

Fubuki-class destroyer

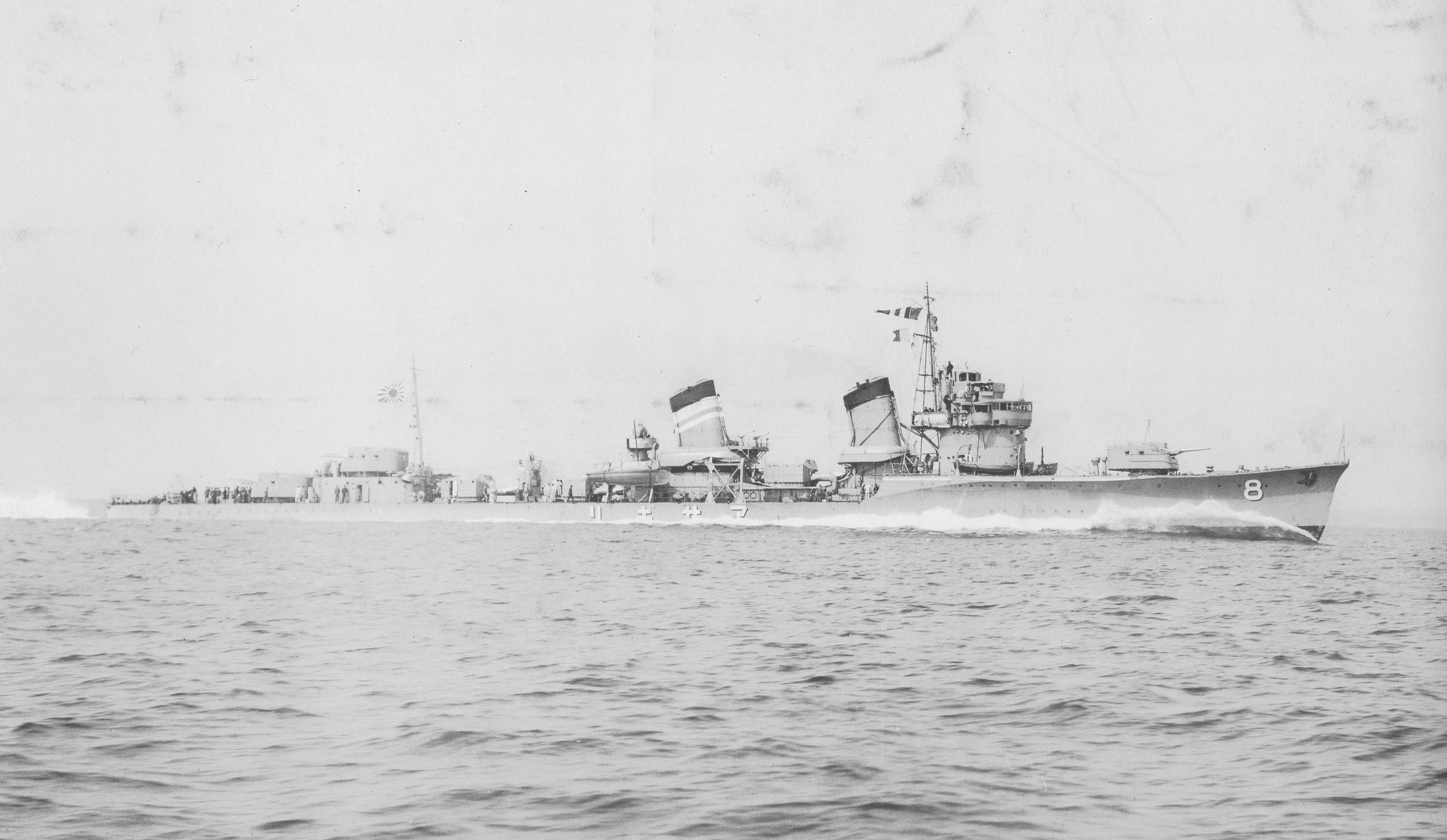
- Asagiri underway on 29 March 1936.

History

Empire of Japan
- Name: Asagiri
- Namesake: Morning Fog
- Ordered: 1923 Fiscal Year
- Builder: Sasebo Naval Arsenal
- Yard number: Destroyer No. 47
- Laid down: 12 December 1928
- Launched: 18 November 1929
- Commissioned: 30 June 1930
- Stricken: 1 October 1942
- Fate: Sunk in action, 28 August 1942

General characteristics
- Class & type: Fubuki-class destroyer
- Displacement: 1,750 long tons (1,780 t) standard; 2,050 long tons (2,080 t) re-built
- Length: 111.96 m (367.3 ft) pp; 115.3 m (378 ft) waterline; 118.41 m (388.5 ft) overall
- Beam: 10.4 m (34 ft 1 in)
- Draft: 3.2 m (10 ft 6 in)
- Propulsion: 4 × Kampon type boilers; 2 × Kampon Type Ro geared turbines; 2 × shafts at 50,000 ihp (37,000 kW)
- Speed: 38 knots (44 mph; 70 km/h)
- Range: 5,000 nmi (9,300 km) at 14 knots (26 km/h)
- Complement: 219
- Armament: 6 × Type 3 127 mm 50 caliber naval guns (3×2); up to 22 × Type 96 25 mm AT/AA Guns; up to 10 × 13 mm AA guns; 9 × 610 mm (24 in) torpedo tubes; 36 × depth charges

Service record
- Operations: Second Sino-Japanese War; Battle of Malaya; Battle of Midway; Solomon Islands campaign

Asagiri (朝霧, "Morning Fog") was the 13th of 24 Fubuki-class destroyers, built for the Imperial Japanese Navy (IJN) following World War I.

== History ==
Construction of the advanced Fubuki-class destroyers was authorized as part of the IJN's expansion program from fiscal 1923, intended to give Japan a qualitative edge with the world's most modern ships. The Fubuki class' performance was a quantum leap over previous destroyer designs, so much so that they were designated Special Type destroyers (特型, Tokugata). Their large size, powerful engines, high speed, large radius of action, and unprecedented armament gave these destroyers the firepower similar to many light cruisers in other navies. Asagiri, built at the Sasebo Naval Arsenal was the eighth in an improved series, which incorporated a modified gun turret which could elevate her main battery of Type 3 127 mm 50 caliber naval guns to 75° as opposed to the original 40°, thus permitting the guns to be used as dual-purpose guns against aircraft. Asagiri was laid down on 12 December 1928, launched on 18 November 1929, and commissioned on 30 June 1930. Originally assigned hull designation Destroyer No. 47, she was named Asagiri, after that of a previous Harusame-class destroyer before her launch.

== Operational history ==
In 1932, after the First Shanghai Incident, Asagiri was assigned to patrols of the Yangtze River. In 1935, after the IJN 4th Fleet incident, in which a large number of ships were damaged by a typhoon, her sister ships and she were modified with stronger hulls and increased displacement. From 1937, Asagiri covered landing of Japanese forces in Shanghai and Hangzhou during the Second Sino-Japanese War. From 1940, she was assigned to patrol and cover landings of Japanese forces in south China, and subsequently participated in the Invasion of French Indochina.

=== World War II history ===
At the time of the attack on Pearl Harbor, Asagiri was assigned to Destroyer Division 20 of Desron 3 of the IJN 1st Fleet and had deployed from Kure Naval District to the port of Samah on Hainan Island, escorting Japanese troopships for landing operations in the Battle of Malaya.

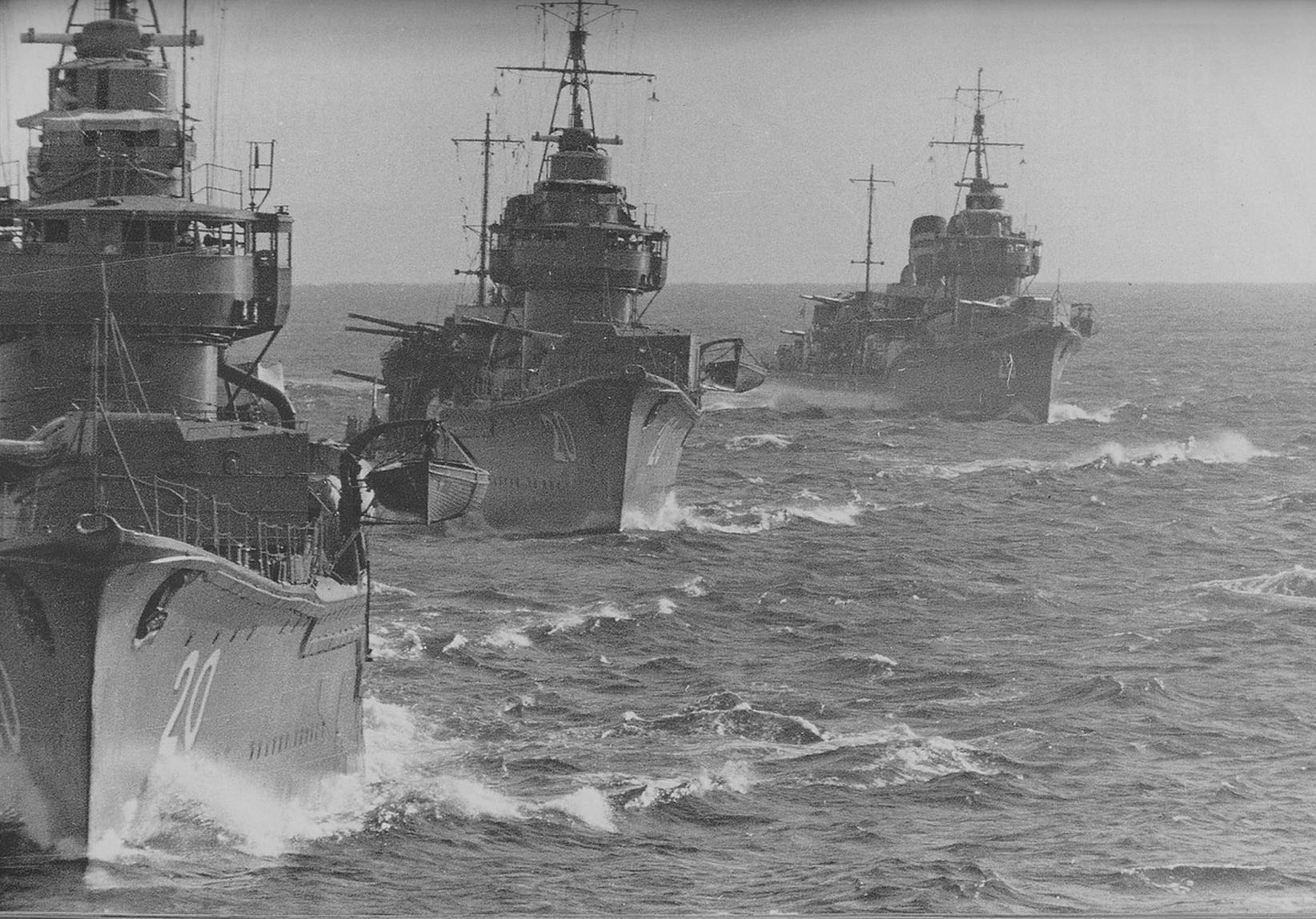
Destroyers Sagiri, Amagiri, and Asagiri of the Type II of the "Fubuki"-class in exercises: The photo was taken from the Yugiri on October 16, 1941.

On 27 January, Asagiri and her convoy were attacked by the destroyers HMS Thanet and HMAS Vampire about 80 nautical miles (148 km) north of Singapore in the Battle off Endau, and her torpedoes are credited with helping sink Thanet. Asagiri subsequently was part of the escort for the heavy cruisers Suzuya, Kumano, Mogami, and Mikuma in support of the Operation L (the invasion of Banka and Palembang and the Anambas Islands in the Netherlands East Indies). On 13 February, Asagiri participated in the shelling of HMS Giang Bee. At the end of February, Asagiri covered minesweeping operations around Singapore and Johore.

In March, Asagiri was assigned to Operation L (the invasion of northern Sumatra) and "Operation D" (the invasion of the Andaman Islands). During the Indian Ocean raids, Asagiri, together with cruisers Chōkai and Yura and aircraft carrier Ryūjō, is credited with sinking six merchant vessels. From 13–22 April Asagiri returned via Singapore and Camranh Bay to Kure Naval Arsenal, for maintenance.

On 4–5 June, Asagiri participated in the Battle of Midway and was part of the diversionary Aleutian Invasion force. In July 1942, Asagiri sailed from Amami-Ōshima to Mako Guard District, Singapore, Sabang and Mergui for a projected second Indian Ocean raid. The operation was cancelled due to the Guadalcanal campaign, and Asagiri was ordered to Truk, instead, arriving in late August.

After the Battle of the Eastern Solomons on 24 August, Asagiri took on troops from transport ships while at sea, and sailed on to Guadalcanal. During this operation, she took a direct hit from a bomb dropped from torpedo launchers by United States Marine Corps SBD Dauntless dive bombers from Henderson Field. The explosion killed 122 men, including 60 ground troops, and sank Asagiri near Santa Isabel, 60 nautical miles (110 km) north-northeast of Savo Island at position 08°0′S 160°10′E.

On 1 October 1942, Asagiri was removed from the IJN list.
