= Japanese cruiser Sendai =

Naval warship (1924–1944)

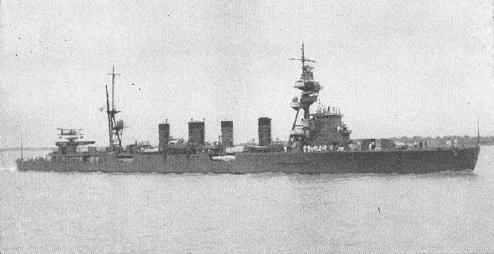

History

Empire of Japan
- Name: Sendai
- Namesake: Sendai River
- Ordered: 1920 Fiscal Year
- Builder: Mitsubishi
- Laid down: 16 February 1922
- Launched: 30 October 1923
- Commissioned: 29 April 1924
- Stricken: 5 January 1944
- Fate: Sunk 3 November 1943; by United States Navy cruisers at Battle of Empress Augusta Bay, Solomon Sea; 06°10′S 154°20′E.

General characteristics
- Class & type: Sendai-class light cruiser
- Displacement: 5,195 long tons (5,278 t) (standard)
- Length: 152.4 m (500 ft 0 in)
- Beam: 14.2 m (46 ft 7 in)
- Draft: 4.9 m (16 ft 1 in)
- Installed power: 90,000 shp (67,000 kW)
- Propulsion: 4 × Parsons geared turbines; 10 × Kampon boilers; 4 × shafts
- Speed: 35.3 kn (65.4 km/h; 40.6 mph)
- Range: 5,000 nmi (9,000 km; 6,000 mi) at 14 kn (26 km/h; 16 mph)
- Complement: 452
- Armament: 7 × 140 mm (5.5 in)/50 guns (7x1); 2 × 80 mm (3 in)/40 anti-aircraft guns; 4 × 610 mm (24 in) torpedo tubes (2x2); 48 × mines
- Armor: Armor Belt: 64 mm (2.5 in); Deck: 29 mm (1.1 in)
- Aircraft carried: 1 × floatplane
- Aviation facilities: 1 × catapult

Sendai (川内) was a Sendai-class light cruiser in the Imperial Japanese Navy. She was named after the Sendai River in southern Kyūshū. Sendai was the lead ship of the three vessels completed in her class of light cruisers, and like other vessels of her class, she was intended for use as the flagship of a destroyer flotilla.

== Service career ==
=== Early career ===
Sendai was completed at the Mitsubishi Nagasaki shipyards on 29 April 1924. Immediately on completion, she was assigned to Yangtze River patrol in China. She played an important role in the Battle of Shanghai in the opening stages of the Second Sino-Japanese War, and later covered the landings of Japanese forces in southern China.

=== Invasions of Southeast Asia ===
On 20 November 1941, Sendai became flagship of Destroyer Squadron 3 (DesRon 3) under Rear Admiral Shintaro Hashimoto.

At the time of the attack on Pearl Harbor, Sendai was engaged in escorting transports carrying Lieutenant General Tomoyuki Yamashita and the Japanese 25th Army to invade Malaya. At 23:45 on 7 December 1941, Sendai and her destroyer squadron (Ayanami, Isonami, Shikinami, and Uranami) commenced a bombardment of Kota Bharu, Malaya. They were attacked by seven RAAF Hudson bombers, which sank one of the transports and damaged two others.

On 9 December 1941, the submarine I-65 reported sighting of Royal Navy Force Z (the Royal Navy battleship HMS Prince of Wales, battlecruiser HMS Repulse and supporting destroyers). The report was received by Sendai, which relayed the message to Vice Admiral Jisaburō Ozawa aboard his flagship, the heavy cruiser Chōkai. However, the reception was poor and the message took another 90 minutes to decode. Moreover, I-65's report was incorrect about the heading of Force Z. The following day, Force Z was overwhelmed by torpedo bombers of the 22nd Air Flotilla from Indochina.

On 19 December 1941, off Kota Bahru in the South China Sea, Royal Netherlands Navy submarine HNLMS O 20 sighted Sendai escorting the second Malaya Convoy's 39 transports. At 11:15, Sendai's floatplane, a Kawanishi E7K2 "Alf", spotted and bombed O 20, which was also attacked by the destroyers Ayanami and Yūgiri with depth charges. That night, O 20 surfaced to recharge her batteries, and a flame from her engines' exhaust gave her away; she was sunk by Uranami.

Sendai made three more troop convoy escort runs to Malay at the end of December 1941 and in January 1942. On the fourth run, on 10 January 1942, the US submarine USS Seadragon spotted the convoy and fired two torpedoes at the last transport, but both missed. On the fifth run, on 26 January, Sendai and her convoy were attacked by the destroyers HMS Thanet and HMAS Vampire about 80 nmi (148 km) north of Singapore in the Battle off Endau. The torpedoes from the Allied vessels missed, and the destroyer Shirayuki and Sendai returned gunfire. Thanet was sunk, while Vampire was undamaged and escaped to Singapore.

On 16 February, Sendai sank the navy tugboat HMS Yin Ping, and teamed with the destroyer Fubuki to capture a ship identified as a British tanker. From the rest of February and through March, Sendai was assigned to cover Japanese landings in Sumatra, and in sweeping the sea lanes and the Strait of Malacca for British and Dutch vessels escaping from Singapore. At the end of March, Sendai covered the landing of one battalion of the IJA's 18th Infantry Division at Port Blair, Andaman Islands. At the end of April, Sendai returned to Sasebo for repairs.

=== Battle of Midway ===
On 29 May 1942, Sendai departed with the Main Body of the Combined Fleet for Midway. The Main Body remained 600 nmi (1,110 km) behind Vice Admiral Chuichi Nagumo's First Carrier Striking Force and thus did not engage American forces. Sendai returned to Kure on 14 June 1942 without having seen combat.

=== Solomon Islands campaigns ===
On 15 July 1942, DesRon 3 was reassigned to the Southwest Force to cover operations in Burma and raids in the Indian Ocean, arriving at Mergui, Burma 31 July. However, with American landings on Guadalcanal, the planned Indian Ocean operations were cancelled and Sendai was sent to Makassar, Davao and Truk instead, to escort troop convoys to Rabaul, New Britain and Shortland, Bougainville. On 8 September, Sendai shelled Tulagi, and on 12 September she and the destroyers Shikinami, Fubuki and Suzukaze bombarded Henderson Field, Guadalcanal. Sendai remained active in Solomon Island operations through November 1942, participating in both the First Naval Battle of Guadalcanal (where she remained as distant cover) and the Second Naval Battle of Guadalcanal (where she was attacked by the battleship USS Washington's 16 in (406 mm) main guns but escaped undamaged).

On 25 February 1943, Sendai was reassigned to the Eighth Fleet at Rabaul under Vice Admiral Gunichi Mikawa and remained on patrol around Rabaul through April. Returning to Sasebo in May, Sendai was repaired and modified. Her No.5 5.5 in (140 mm) gun mount was removed and two triple 25 mm AA gun mounts and Type 21 radar were installed. Repairs were completed 25 June 1943 and Sendai returned to Truk on 5 July. On 7 July, Rear Admiral Baron Matsuji Ijuin assumed command of DesRon 3. During the next three months, Sendai operated out of Rabaul covering reinforcement convoys to Buin, Papua New Guinea and Shortland.

On 18 July 1943, off Kolombangara, the group was attacked by Guadalcanal-based Marine Grumman TBF Avenger torpedo bombers, and two days later by North American B-25 Mitchell medium bombers but was not damaged; it also escaped damage after being bombed by a Consolidated B-24 Liberator heavy bomber on 1 November 1943.

The following day, 2 November 1943, at the Battle of Empress Augusta Bay, the Japanese fleet attempting to reinforce Bougainville was intercepted by Task Force 39 with the light cruisers USS Cleveland, Columbia, Montpelier and Denver and destroyers USS Stanly, Charles Ausburne, Claxton, Dyson, Converse, Foote, Spence and Thatcher. The Japanese force included the cruisers Myōkō, Haguro, Sendai and Agano with destroyers Shigure, Samidare, Shiratsuyu, Naganami, Wakatsuki, Hatsukaze.

Shigure spotted the American destroyers at 7,500 yd (6,900 m), turned hard starboard and launched eight torpedoes. Sendai also turned hard starboard, but bore down on Shigure, barely avoiding a collision. All four Allied cruisers took Sendai under radar directed 6-inch fire. They hit her with their first salvo and more thereafter, setting her afire. Sendai sank the following morning at 06°10′S 154°20′E, along with Hatsukaze. Captain Shoji and 184 crewmen went down with the ship, but 236 other crewmen were rescued by destroyers.

On 3 November 1943, Admiral Ijuin and 75 more survivors from Sendai were rescued by the Japanese submarine Ro-104.

Sendai was removed from the Navy List on 5 January 1944.
