= William Thomas Alldis Moran =

William Moran
- Born: 11 December 1903; Fremantle, Western Australia
- Died: 9 April 1942 (aged 38); Indian Ocean, off Ceylon
- Military career
- Allegiance: Australia
- Branch: Royal Australian Navy
- Service years: 1917–1942
- Rank: Commander
- Service number: P11013034
- Commands: HMAS Vampire
- Conflicts: Arab revolt in Palestine; Second World War; Indian Ocean theatre; South-East Asian theatre; Sinking of Prince of Wales and Repulse; Battle off Endau
- Awards: Mentioned in Despatches (2)

Commander William Thomas Alldis Moran (11 December 1903 – 9 April 1942) was an officer of the Royal Australian Navy during the Second World War. Moran went down with HMAS Vampire, when it was sunk by Japanese aircraft off Ceylon (later Sri Lanka) in 1942.

== Early life ==
William Thomas Alldis Moran was born in Fremantle, Western Australia, on 11 December 1903, the son of Rose May (née Alldis) and William Thomas Moran. Moran grew up at Kalgoorlie, where his family was prominent in sporting circles.

== Naval career ==
Moran, whose service number was P11013034, entered the Australian Naval College in 1917 and graduated in 1921. A specialist torpedo officer, he was initially posted to HMAS Brisbane. Soon afterward, Moran was attached to the Royal Navy, and served on the British battleships HMS Conqueror and HMS Valiant.

Moran was promoted to Commander in 1939. He joined the heavy cruiser HMAS Canberra in 1940. In September the following year, while Canberra was alongside HMAS Vampire at Singapore, Moran transferred to Vampire and took command.

On 10 December, following the outbreak of the Pacific War, Vampire was part of the destroyer screen for the British battleships Prince of Wales and Repulse. Following an attack by 85 Japanese aircraft, off Kuantan, both battleships sank. Vampire rescued 225 of the 2,081 survivors from the sea and transported them to Singapore.

During the Battle of Endau, on the night of 26/27 January 1942, Vampire and HMS Thanet harassed a larger Japanese force: an invasion convoy bound for Songkhla. Both Allied destroyers came intense bombardment from a Japanese cruiser and six destroyers. While Thanet was sunk, Vampire was undamaged and had no casualties.

In early April 1942, while attached to the British Eastern Fleet, Vampire was ordered to escort the British aircraft carrier HMS Hermes from Ceylon. Following the Japanese Fast Carrier Task Force's attack on Colombo in early April, Hermes and Vampire were ordered to depart Trincomalee, to avoid any follow-up strike. On 8 April, the two ships were located and attacked by Japanese aircraft, from 10:35. The first wave of attackers severely damaged Hermes, which sank within 20 minutes. A second wave of Japanese aircraft attacked and scored many hits on the destroyer. Vampire shot down at least one aircraft before breaking in half and sinking. Despite the intensity of the Japanese air attack, Moran was one of only nine fatalities on Vampire.

== See also ==
- Scrap Iron Flotilla
- Malayan Campaign
