= Canberra Maru =

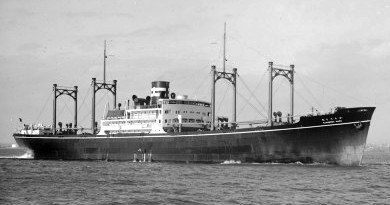

History
- Name: Canberra Maru
- Owner: Osaka Shosen Kaisha
- Builder: Mitsubishi Zosen Kaisha, Nagasaki, Japan
- Laid down: 1935
- Launched: 1936
- Completed: 30 May 1936
- Maiden voyage: 5 June 1936
- Fate: Sunk by air attack, 14 November 1942

General characteristics
- Type: Cargo ship
- Tonnage: 6,477 GRT
- Length: 135.9 m (446 ft)
- Propulsion: Diesel engine
- Speed: 17.5 knots (32.4 km/h; 20.1 mph)

MV Canberra Maru was an 6,477-gross register ton (GRT) freighter built by Mitsubishi Zosen Kaisha, Nagasaki, Japan, in 1936 for Osaka Shosen Kaisha. The ship was one of the targets of the British attacks during the Battle off Endau in January 1942. She was sunk by American aircraft near Guadalcanal, 14 November 1942.
