= Kansai Maru =

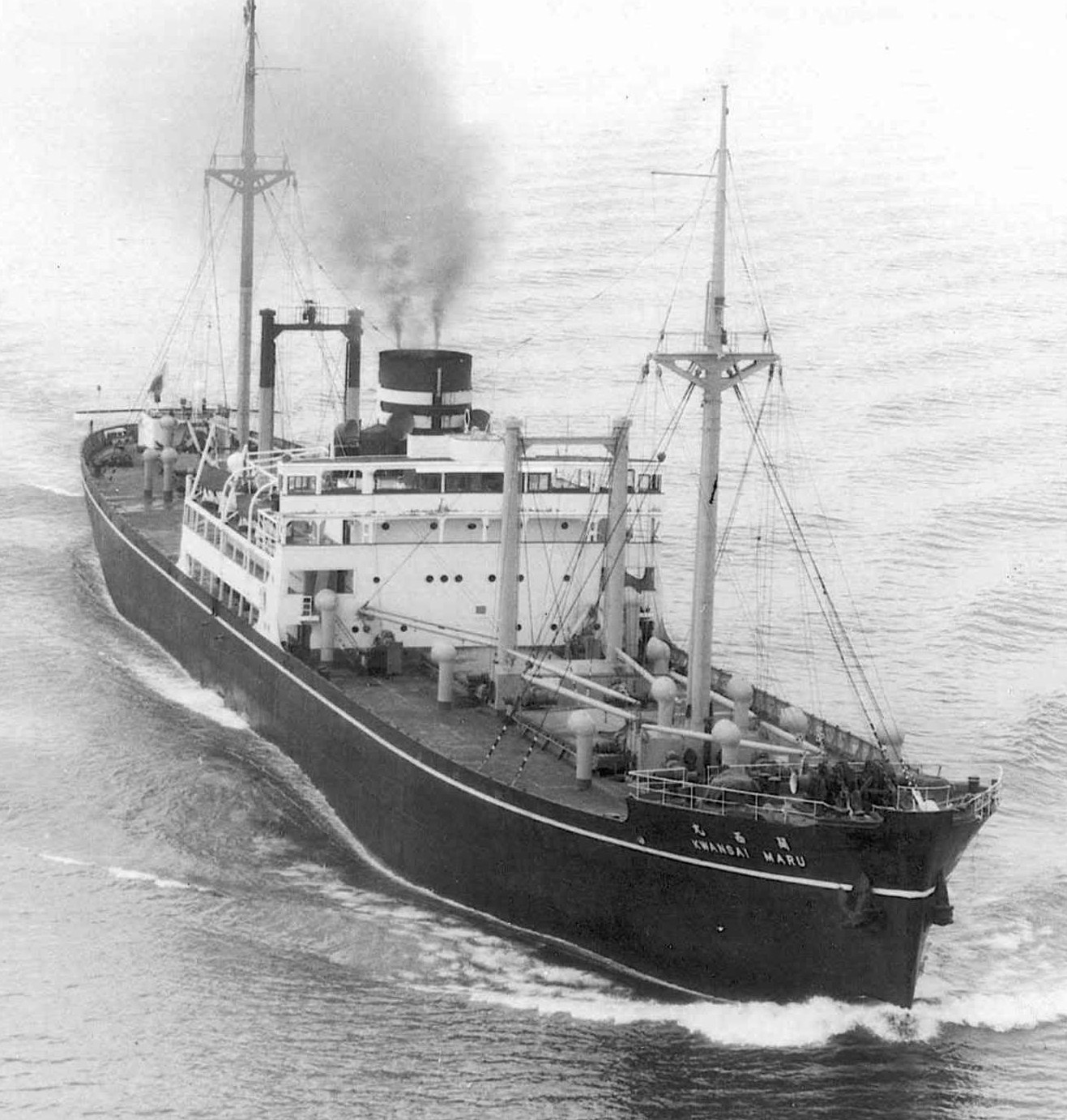
- Kansai Maru at speed

History
- Name: Kansai Maru
- Owner: Harada Kisen KK
- Builder: Yokohama Dock Co., Yokohama, Japan
- Yard number: 180
- Launched: 19 September 1930
- Completed: 1930
- Fate: Sunk, 19 September 1943

General characteristics
- Type: Cargo ship
- Tonnage: 8,614 GRT
- Length: 140.7 m (461.7 ft)
- Propulsion: Diesel engine
- Speed: 17.5 knots (32.4 km/h; 20.1 mph)

MV Kansai Maru (Kanji:関西丸) was an 8,614-gross register ton (GRT) freighter built by Yokohama Dock Co., Yokohama, Japan, in 1930 for Harada Kisen KK. She was requisitioned by the Imperial Japanese Army as a transport in September 1941. The ship was one of the targets of the British attacks during the Battle off Endau in January 1942. Kansai Maru was sunk by the American submarine USS Scamp on 19 September 1943.
