= 1st Air Squadron (Japan) =

- Active: July 5, 1938 – 1945
- Country: Empire of Japan
- Allegiance: Empire of Japan
- Branch: (Empire of Japan) Imperial Japanese Army
- Type: Army aviation unit
- Role: Fighter, bomber, reconnaissance
- Engagements: World War II

Commanders
- Notable commanders: Yoshitoshi Tokugawa; Masanori Makino; Tetsuji Ie; Hiroyuki Shimoto

The 1st Air Squadron (第一飛行戦隊 Dai-ichi-hikō sentai) was a flying unit of the Imperial Japanese Army Air Service. The unit was established on 5 July 1938 at Kagamigahara, Japan. The unit saw service in Manchuria during the Manchuria Incident, China during the Second Sino-Japanese War and Burma, Netherlands East Indies, Indochina, Rabaul, Solomon Islands, New Guinea, Philippines, Formosa and Japan during World War II. The unit was disbanded at Takahagi, Japan in late 1945.

== History ==
The 1st Air Squadron can trace its roots back to the First World War, where the Imperial Japanese Army used early aircraft in their conquest of German held islands. The "Temporary Air Force" as it was known was primarily used at the Siege of Tsingtao and would ultimately be disbanded in January 1915. Soon after, its successor the 1st Aviation Battalion was established in October of the same year. The original unit was then upgraded in size to the 1st Air Regiment on June 1, 1925, in conjunction with the inauguration of the Army Air Forces Headquarters, which controlled the air force.

In 1915, the "Provisional Air Force," which had been formed during World War I, was scheduled to increase its air power. This includes the independence of the air force and a creation of ten squadrons composing of six fighter squadrons, two light bomber squadrons, and two heavy bomber squadrons. As a result, the 1st Flying Regiment, initially a battalion in size, was assigned two reconnaissance aircraft squadrons bring its total to two reconnaissance aircraft squadrons and two fighter squadrons. Later, the regiment was renamed to the 1st Air Squadron due to the separation of ground and air units within the Japanese army.

== Aircraft ==
- Ki-27 (1939 - May 1942)
- Ki-43 I (July 1942 - August 1943)
- Ki-43 II (September 1943 - April 1944)
- Ki-84 (April 1944 - August 1945)

== Bases ==
- Kanchuerhmiao Nomonhan Jun 1939
- Saienjo Nomonhan Jun 1939 Sep 1939
- Sunjia near Harbin Oct 1939 Nov 1941
- Kompong Trach, Cambodia Dec 1941
- Singora Malaya Dec 1941 Jan 1942
- Kuantan Malaya Jan 1942 Feb 1942
- Tandjungkarang south Sumatra Feb 1942 Mar 1942
- Toungoo, Burma Mar 1942 May 1942
- Mingaladon, Burma May 1942
- Akeno Jul 1942 Aug 1942
- Palembang, Sumatra, August 1942 - October 1942
- Tourane, Indochina Oct 1942
- Hanoi, Indochina Oct 1942
- Singapore Nov 1942 Dec 1942
- Rabaul, New Britain Jan 1943 Aug 1943
- Ballale, Solomon Islands, January 1943
- Wewak, New Guinea, February 1943 (detached)
- Lae, New Guinea, March 1943
- Wewak, New Guinea, April 1943 - August 1943
- Osaka, Japan, September 1943 - November 1943
- Mengguli Nov 1943
- Kashiwa near Tokyo Nov 1943 Oct 1944
- Gan-no-su northern Kyushu Aug 1944 Sep 1944 (detached)
- Clark Field, Luzon Oct 1944
- Manapla Negros Oct 1944 Nov 1944
- Shimodate Kanto district Nov 1944 Dec 1944
- Porac, Luzon Dec 1944 Jan 1945
- Chaochou, Formosa Jan 1945 Feb 1945
- Shimodate, Kanto district Mar 1945 Apr 1945
- Takahagi, Kanto district Apr 1945 Aug 1945
