= Sendai River (Kyushu) =

River on Kyushu island, Japan

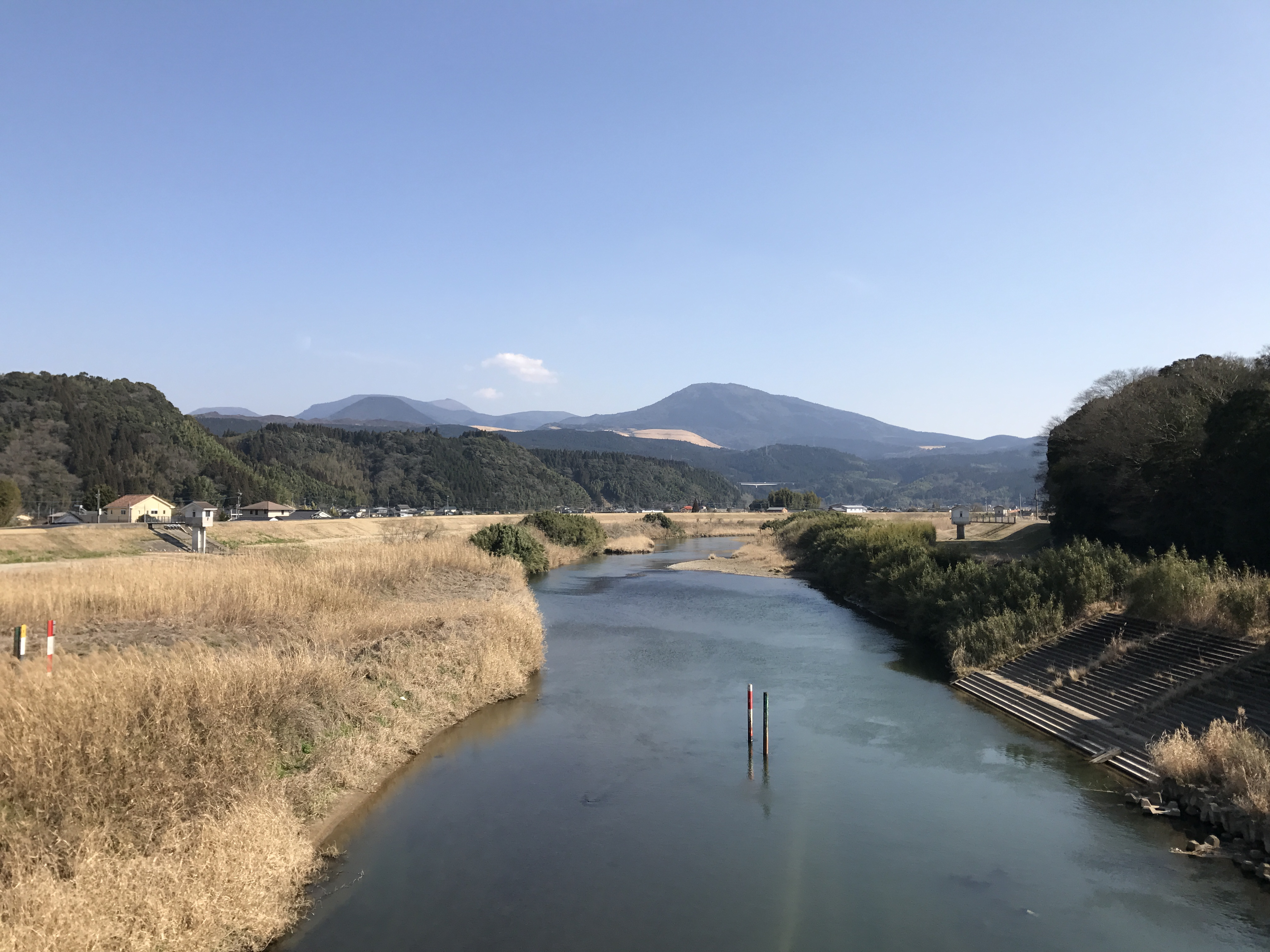
- Sendai River seen from Yoshimatsubashi Bridge

- Location within Japan
- Native name: 川内川 (Japanese)

Location
- Country: Japan
- Prefectures: Miyazaki Prefecture/Kagoshima Prefecture

Physical characteristics
- Source
  - coordinates: 32.1544°N 130.912°E
- Mouth: East China Sea
  - coordinates: 31.849°N 130.1935°E
- Length: 137 km (85 mi)
- Basin size: 1,600 km^{2} (620 sq mi)

The Sendai River (川内川, Sendai-gawa) is a river in Miyazaki and Kagoshima Prefectures in Japan on the island of Kyushu. It is designated as a Class A river.

The river is 137 km (85 mi) long, its basin size is 1,600 km^{2} (620 sq mi).

The river rises on the slopes of Mount Shiragatake, then flows west on the Kakuto plain. After Tsuruta dam it flows through the Sendai plain and discharges into East China Sea.
