= Japanese destroyer Shirayuki (1928) =

Fubuki-class destroyer

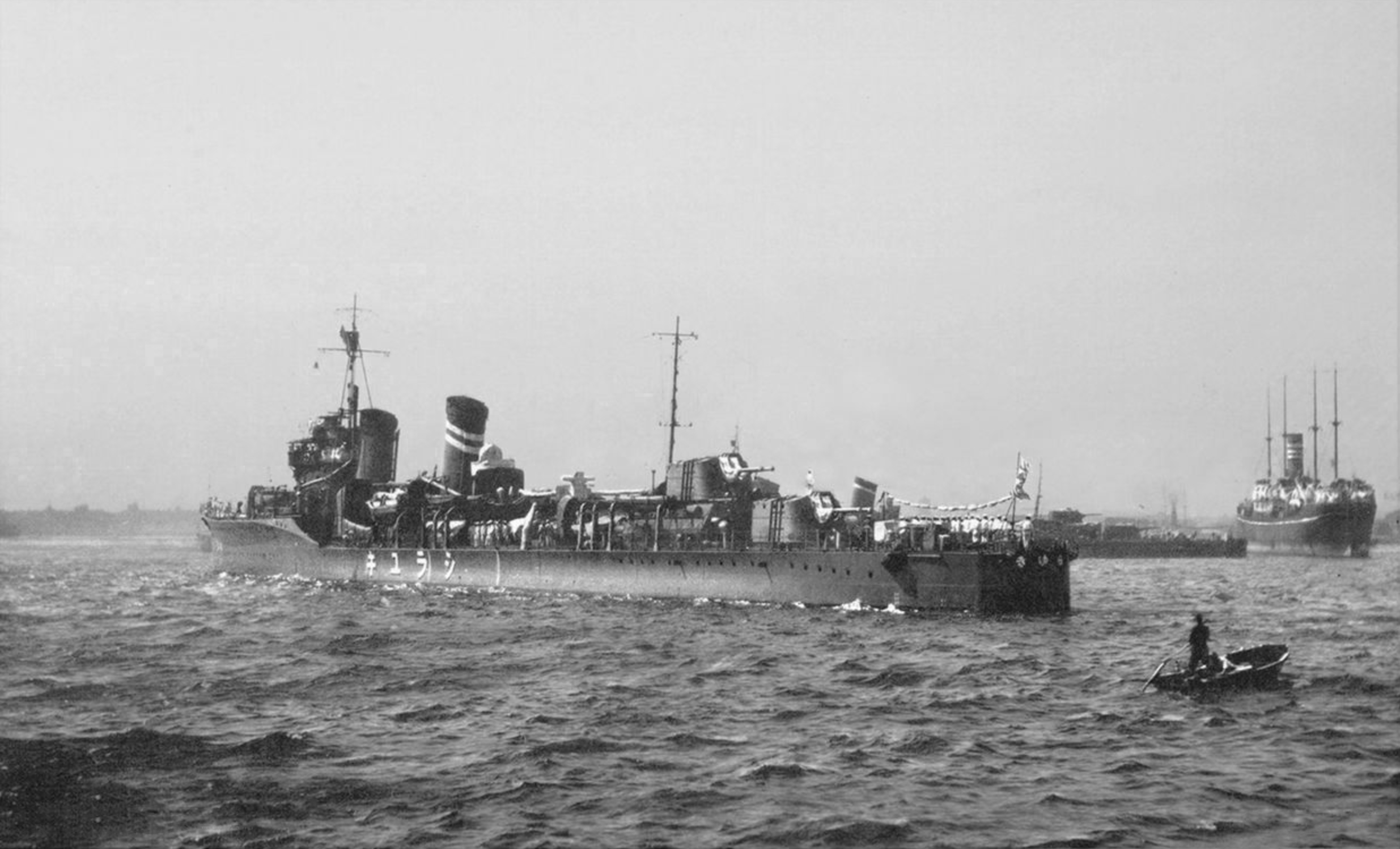
- Shirayuki in 1931

History

Empire of Japan
- Name: Shirayuki
- Namesake: Japanese destroyer Shirayuki (1906)
- Ordered: 1923 Fiscal Year
- Builder: Yokohama Shipyards
- Yard number: Destroyer No.36
- Laid down: 19 March 1927
- Launched: 20 March 1928
- Commissioned: 18 December 1928
- Stricken: 1 April 1943
- Fate: Sunk in air attack by American and Australian aircraft bombs on 3 March 1943

General characteristics
- Class & type: Fubuki-class destroyer
- Displacement: 1,750 long tons (1,780 t) standard; 2,050 long tons (2,080 t) re-built
- Length: 111.96 m (367.3 ft) pp; 115.3 m (378 ft) waterline; 118.41 m (388.5 ft) overall
- Beam: 10.4 m (34 ft 1 in)
- Draft: 3.2 m (10 ft 6 in)
- Propulsion: 4 × Kampon type boilers; 2 × Kampon Type Ro geared turbines; 2 × shafts at 50,000 ihp (37,000 kW)
- Speed: 38 knots (44 mph; 70 km/h)
- Range: 5,000 nmi (9,300 km) at 14 knots (26 km/h)
- Complement: 219
- Armament: 6 × Type 3 127 mm 50 caliber naval guns (3×2); up to 22 × Type 96 25 mm AT/AA Guns; up to 10 × 13 mm AA guns; 9 × 610 mm (24 in) torpedo tubes; 36 × depth charges

Service record
- Operations: Second Sino-Japanese War; Battle of Malaya; Battle of Midway; Indian Ocean raid; Solomon Islands campaign

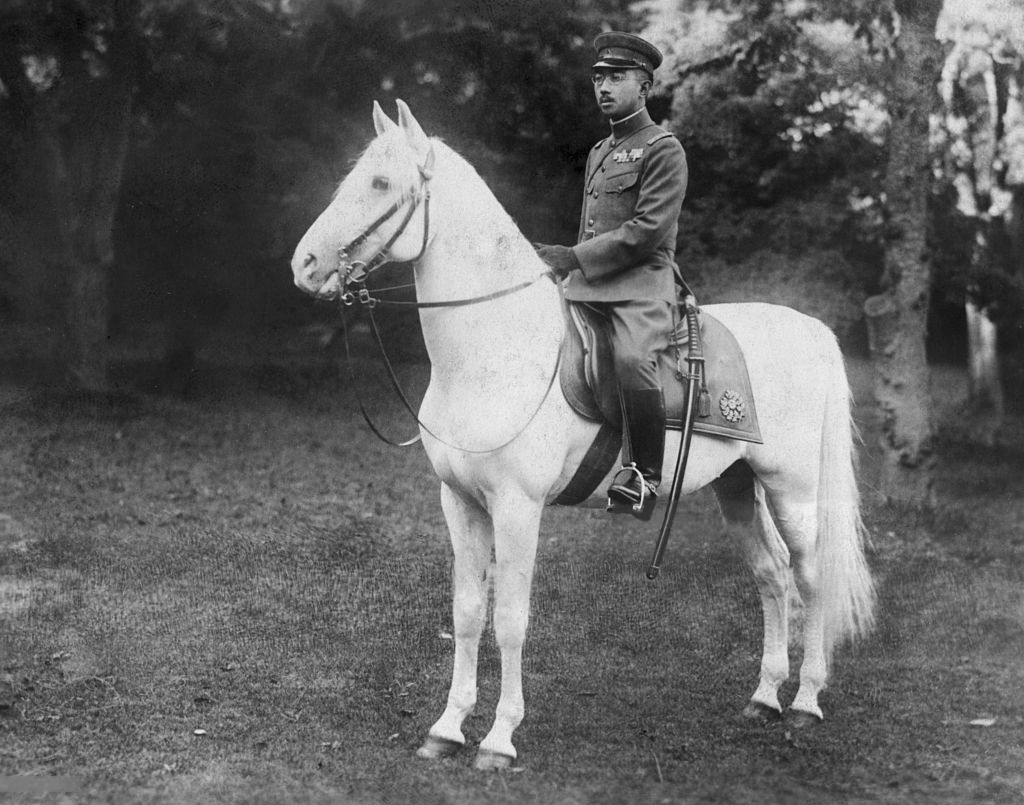
Hirohito mounted on the stallion Shirayuki, after whom the destroyer was named

Shirayuki (白雪, "White Snow") was the second of twenty-four Fubuki-class destroyers, built for the Imperial Japanese Navy following World War I. Shirayuki was sunk in the Battle of the Bismarck Sea on 3 March 1943 while under attack by American and Australian aircraft.

== History ==
Construction of the advanced Fubuki-class destroyers was authorized as part of the Imperial Japanese Navy's expansion program from fiscal 1923, intended to give Japan a qualitative edge with the world's most modern ships. The Fubuki class had performance that was a quantum leap over previous destroyer designs, so much so that they were designated Special Type destroyers (特型, Tokugata). The large size, powerful engines, high speed, large radius of action and unprecedented armament gave these destroyers the firepower similar to many light cruisers in other navies. Shirayuki, built at the Yokohama Shipyards was laid down on 19 March 1927, launched on 20 March 1928 and commissioned on 18 December 1928. Originally assigned hull designation "Destroyer No. 36", she was completed as Shirayuki, after Emperor Shōwa's favorite white stallion.

== Operational history ==
On completion, Shirayuki was assigned to Destroyer Division 11 under the IJN 2nd Fleet. During the Second Sino-Japanese War, Shirayuki was assigned to patrols of the southern China coast, and participated in the Invasion of French Indochina in 1940.

=== World War II history ===
At the time of the attack on Pearl Harbor, Shirayuki was assigned to Destroyer Division 11 of Desron 3 of the IJN 1st Fleet, and had deployed from Kure Naval District to the port of Samah on Hainan Island. From 4 December 1941 through February 1942, Shirayuki covered the landings of Japanese troops in Malaya, Anambas Islands and "Operation B" (the invasion of British Borneo). On 27 January, Shirayuki and her convoy were attacked by the destroyers HMS Thanet and HMAS Vampire about 80 nautical miles (148 km) north of Singapore in the Battle off Endau, and her torpedoes are credited with helping sink Thanet.

In February 1942, Shirayuki was part of the escort for the heavy cruiser Chōkai during "Operation L" (the invasion of Banka and Palembang in the Netherlands East Indies), and was credited with sinking or capturing four transports attempting to flee from Singapore.

Shirayuki was subsequently assigned to "Operation J" (the invasion of Java), and was in the Battle of Sunda Strait on 1 March, assisting in the sinking of the Australian cruiser HMAS Perth and the American cruiser USS Houston. Shirayuki took a shell hit direct to her bridge during the battle, killing one crewman and injuring 11 others.

In early March, Shirayuki escorted a troop convoy from Singapore to Burma, and participated in "Operation D", the invasion of the Andaman Islands on 23 March. During the Indian Ocean raids, Shirayuki was assigned to patrols out of Port Blair. From 13 to 22 April, Shirayuki returned via Singapore and Camranh Bay to Kure Naval Arsenal, for maintenance.

On 4–5 June, Shirayuki participated in the Battle of Midway as part of Admiral Isoroku Yamamoto's main fleet. In July 1942, Shirayuki sailed from Amami-Oshima to Mako Guard District, Singapore, Sabang and Mergui for a projected second Indian Ocean raid. The operation was cancelled due to the Guadalcanal campaign, and she was ordered to Truk and Rabaul instead. From August through November, Shirayuki was used for numerous "Tokyo Express" high speed transport missions in the Solomon Islands. On 12 October, she rescued the survivors of her sister ship Murakumo, which had been torpedoed.

On 14–15 November, Shirayuki was involved in the Second Naval Battle of Guadalcanal. She was initially attached to Admiral Kurita's support force, and then joined Admiral Kondo's emergency bombardment force. Together with the light cruiser Nagara, Shirayuki assisted in sinking two of the four American destroyers involved (USS Preston and USS Walke) mortally wounding USS Benham (which was scuttled after the battle), and severely damaged USS Gwin, causing heavy American losses in the first phase of the battle.

Shirayuki returned briefly to Kure at the end of the year, as escort for the aircraft carrier Hiyo.

In January 1943, Shirayuki returned to the Solomon Islands as part of a major reinforcement convoy from Shanghai, arriving with Rear Admiral Shintarō Hashimoto at Shortland Island at the end of January, and serving as the admiral's flagship during the evacuation of Guadalcanal in February. Shirayuki was reassigned to the IJN 8th Fleet on 25 February .

During the Battle of the Bismarck Sea on 1–4 March, Shirayuki was flagship for Rear Admiral Masatomi Kimura, leading a troop convoy from Rabaul to Lae. In an Allied air attack on 3 March, a skip-bomb exploded in her aft magazine, severing her stern, and killing 32 crewmen. Shirayuki sank 55 nautical miles (102 km) southeast of Finschhafen at position 07°15′S 148°30′E. The survivors, who included Admiral Kimura and her captain Commander Sugawara were rescued by Shikinami.

On 1 April 1943, Shirayuki was removed from the navy list.
