= HMS Thanet =

S-class destroyer

History

United Kingdom
- Name: HMS Thanet
- Ordered: July 1917
- Builder: Hawthorn Leslie & Company, Hebburn
- Laid down: 13 December 1917
- Launched: 5 November 1918
- Commissioned: 3 August 1919
- Identification: Pennant number: H29
- Motto: In hoc signo: 'By this sign you will conquer'
- Fate: Sunk on 27 January 1942
- Badge: On a field Blue a Cross fitched Gold

General characteristics
- Class & type: S-class destroyer
- Displacement: 1,075 tons
- Length: 276 ft (84 m) o/a
- Beam: 26 ft 9 in (8.15 m)
- Draught: 10 ft 10 in (3.30 m)
- Propulsion: Brown-Curtis, steam turbines, 2 shafts, 27,000 shp
- Speed: 36 knots
- Range: 250-300 tons of oil
- Complement: 90
- Armament: 3 × QF 4-inch (101.6 mm) Mark IV guns, mount P Mk. IX; 1 × QF 2 pdr Mark II "pom-pom"; 4 × Lewis Guns; 2 × twin tubes for 21 in torpedoes; 2 × fixed 14 in tubes for torpedoes (later removed)

HMS Thanet was an S-class destroyer of the Royal Navy. Built during, and commissioned shortly after the First World War, she went on to see service in the Second World War, and was sunk early in 1942.

Thanet had been one of the ships on the China Station on the outbreak of war. After briefly being converted to a minelayer she spent the early years of the war patrolling off Hong Kong. With the Japanese entry to the war Thanet evacuated Hong Kong with another destroyer, just hours after the Japanese began their attack on the city. She made her way to Singapore and briefly deployed there until she was sent to intercept an enemy troop convoy, in company with the Australian destroyer Vampire. The allied ships ran into a heavy Japanese force, and after a short battle Thanet was sunk and Vampire was forced to withdraw.

== Construction and commissioning ==
Thanet was ordered from the yards of Hawthorn Leslie & Company, Hebburn in July 1917, part of the 1917–18 Programme. She was laid down there on 13 December 1917 and launched on 5 November 1918, six days before the Armistice with Germany. She was commissioned on 3 August 1919, and was initially used to trial a 'flying off platform' for aircraft.

== Second World War ==
Thanet was on the China Station, deployed with the Local Destroyer Flotilla at Hong Kong on the outbreak of the Second World War on 3 September 1939. Her initial duties involved carrying out patrols and intercepting German shipping, and in October she was nominated to be converted for use as a minelayer. Work began at the naval dockyard in Hong Kong on 18 October, and she was able to participate in the laying of a defensive minefield in Lantau Channel between 21 and 27 October, the following day reverting to her anti-submarine role.

The rest of the year and all of 1940 was spent carrying out similar duties, deploying out of Hong Kong to protect trade and patrol in search of enemy vessels. The threat of the Japanese entry to the war in December 1941 led to negotiations on 6 December between the British commander in the area, Admiral Tom Phillips, and his American counterpart Admiral Thomas C. Hart. Hart agreed to send four destroyers to Singapore, USS Whipple, Alden, John D. Edwards and Edsall, while Phillips would move Thanet and her sister-ship HMS Scout to Singapore.

Events were overtaken by the Japanese attack on Pearl Harbor the following day, and the Japanese assault on Hong Kong which began on 8 December, which was effectively the same day as the Pearl Harbor assault for the International Dateline placed Hong Kong twenty-four hours ahead of the USA. Thanet and Scout hurriedly evacuated the port on 8 December, just hours after the Imperial Japanese Army attack on Mainland positions began, and made their way to Singapore to join the Eastern Fleet. A small force consisting of the destroyer HMS Thracian, the gunboat HMS Cicala and eight motor torpedo boats remained behind to gallantly fight the Japanese. On their arrival at Singapore on 13 December, Thanet and Scout carried out various escort duties.

=== Last battle and sinking ===
On 26 January 1942 Malaya Command received intelligence that a Japanese troop convoy was approaching Endau, and attempted to attack it with nine Lockheed Hudsons of No. 1 and No. 8 Squadrons, and 12 Vickers Vildebeests. The attack went badly, losing five Vildebeests, and was unable to inflict significant damage. Hudsons from 62 Squadron RAF also attacked the Japanese landing, losing two aircraft. The Japanese commander, Vice-Admiral Jisaburō Ozawa had received intelligence reports that two cruisers were at Singapore, and so concentrated his forces off Endau. The two cruisers were in fact Thanet, and the destroyer HMAS Vampire, and following the failure of the air attacks, Malaya Command ordered them to sea to intercept the convoy. They steamed from Singapore at 4:30 pm on 26 January, carrying only three torpedoes each. Early in the morning of 27 January they ran into the covering force of Japanese warships, consisting of three destroyers, later joined by the Japanese cruiser Sendai. Thanet was hit in the engine room and disabled, and began to sink. Vampire attempted to lay down a smoke screen but was driven off under heavy fire, and managed to escape. Thanet sank with the loss of 12 men afterwards. Sixty-five crewmen managed to get to the coast and arrived at Singapore, but 31 were picked up by Shirayuki and handed over to Japanese troops the next day. It is believed they were executed in retaliation for heavy Japanese losses sustained in an ambush by the Australian 2/18th Battalion which occurred at the same time as the naval battle off Endau.

== See also ==
- Battle of Singapore

== General references ==
- Banham, Tony (2009). We Shall Suffer There: Hong Kong's Defenders Imprisoned, 1942-45. Hong Kong University Press. ISBN 978-962-209-960-9.
- Cannon, Peter (2014). "Night Action, Malaya 1942". In Jordan, John (ed.). Warship 2015. London: Conway. pp. 62–80. ISBN 978-1-84486-276-4.
- Colledge, J. J.; Warlow, Ben (2006) [1969]. Ships of the Royal Navy: The Complete Record of All Fighting Ships of the Royal Navy from the 15th Century to the Present (3rd Rev ed.). London: Chatham Publishing. ISBN 978-1-86176-281-8. OCLC 67375475.
- Field, Andrew (2004). Royal Navy Strategy in the Far East, 1919–1939: Preparing for War Against Japan. Routledge. ISBN 0-7146-5321-7.
- Friedman, Norman (2009). British Destroyers: From Earliest Days to the Second World War. Barnsley, UK: Seaforth Publishing. ISBN 978-1-84832-049-9.
- Gardiner, Robert & Gray, Randal, eds. (1985). Conway's All the World's Fighting Ships 1906–1921. London: Conway Maritime Press. ISBN 0-85177-245-5.
- Jackson, Ashley (2006). The British Empire and the Second World War. Continuum International Publishing Group. ISBN 1-85285-417-0.
- March, Edgar J. (1966). British Destroyers: A History of Development, 1892–1953; Drawn by Admiralty Permission from Official Records & Returns, Ships' Covers & Building Plans. London: Seeley Service. OCLC 164893555.
- Stanford, David (2006). Roses in December. Lulu.com. ISBN 1-84753-966-1.
- Swain, Bruce T. (2001). A Chronology of Australian Armed Forces at War 1939–45. Allen & Unwin. ISBN 1-86508-352-6.
- Warren, Allen (2007). Britain's Greatest Defeat: Singapore 1942. Continuum International Publishing Group. ISBN 978-1-85285-597-0.
