= HMAS Vampire (D68) =

1917-1942 V-class destroyer of the Royal and Royal Australian navies

Coordinates: 7°35′N 82°5′E

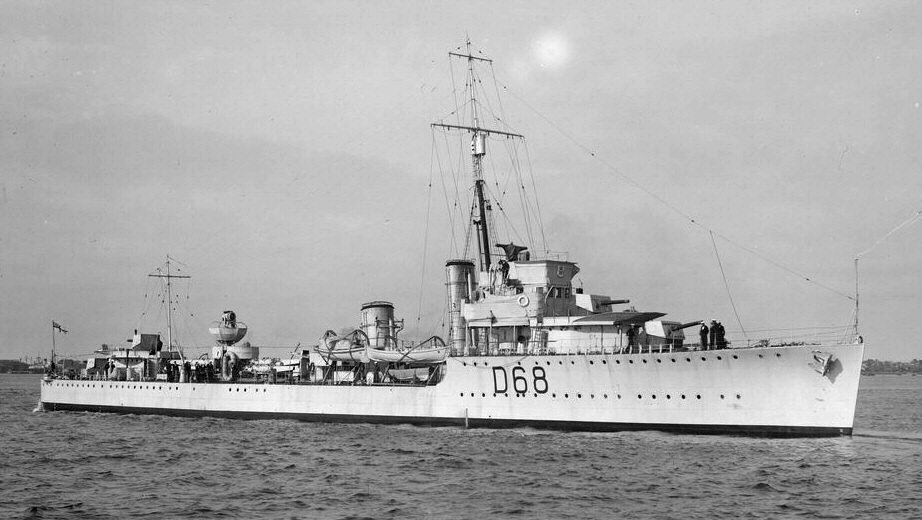
- HMAS Vampire

History

United Kingdom
- Name: Wallace
- Namesake: William Wallace
- Ordered: 1916
- Builder: J. Samuel White & Co Ltd
- Laid down: 10 October 1916
- Launched: 21 May 1917
- Renamed: Vampire 1917
- Commissioned: 22 September 1917
- Decommissioned: 11 November 1933
- Fate: Transferred to Australia

History

Australia
- Name: Vampire
- Namesake: Vampire (mythical creature)
- Acquired: 11 November 1933
- Commissioned: 11 November 1933
- Decommissioned: 31 January 1934
- Recommissioned: 11 May 1938
- Identification: Pennant number D68/I68
- Honours and awards: Battle honours: Calabria 1940; Libya 1940–41; Greece 1941; Crete 1941; Indian Ocean 1941–42
- Fate: Bombed and sunk by Japanese aircraft on 9 April 1942
- Badge

General characteristics (RAN service)
- Class & type: V-class flotilla leader
- Displacement: 1,188 tons standard; 1,489 tons deep
- Length: 312 ft (95.1 m) overall; 300 ft (91.4 m) between perpendiculars
- Beam: 29 ft 6 in (9.0 m)
- Draught: 13 ft 9 in (4.2 m) maximum
- Propulsion: 3 × White Forster boilers, 2 × Brown-Curtis turbines, twin screws, generating 27,000 shp (20,000 kW)
- Speed: 34 knots (63 km/h; 39 mph)
- Range: 3,500 nmi (6,500 km) at 15 knots (28 km/h; 17 mph)
- Complement: 6 officers, 113 sailors
- Armament: 4 × QF 4-inch (101.6 mm) Mk V guns; 1 × QF 2-pounder gun (increased to 2 in January 1942); 4 × Lewis .303 guns (2 twin mountings); 1 × Lewis .303 gun (later replaced by 1 × 4-barrel Vickers .303 gun); 6 × 21 inch (533 mm) torpedo tubes (2 triple mounts, later increased to 2 quad mounts); 2 × depth charge throwers (installed later); 4 × depth charge chutes (installed later); 50 depth charges

HMAS Vampire was a V-class destroyer of the Royal Navy (RN) and Royal Australian Navy (RAN). Launched in 1917 as HMS Wallace, the ship was renamed and commissioned into the RN later that year. Vampire was lent to the RAN in 1933, and operated as a depot tender until just before World War II. Reactivated for war service, the destroyer served in the Mediterranean as part of the Scrap Iron Flotilla, and was escorting the British warships HMS Prince of Wales and HMS Repulse during their loss to Japanese aircraft in the South China Sea in December 1941. Vampire was sunk on 9 April 1942 by Japanese aircraft while sailing with the aircraft carrier HMS Hermes from Trincomalee.

== Construction ==
The destroyer was one of five Admiralty V-class flotilla leaders ordered by the RN in the 1916–17 construction program. Originally, there were to be differences in design between the V class leaders and the rest of the V-class destroyers, but in order to save time in designing the destroyers, changes were limited to the layout of the bridge and accommodation areas.

Vampire had a standard displacement of 1,188 tons, and a deep load displacement of 1,489 tons. She was 312 feet 0.75 inches (95.1167 m) in length overall and 300 feet (91 m) long between perpendiculars, with a beam of 29 feet 6.25 inches (8.9980 m), and a maximum draught of 13 feet 8.75 inches (4.1847 m). Propulsion machinery consisted of three White Forster boilers supplying two Brown-Curtis steam turbines, which provided 27,000 shaft horsepower (20,000 kW) to the destroyer's two propellers. Maximum speed was 34 knots (63 km/h; 39 mph), and Vampire could sail 3,500 nautical miles (6,500 km; 4,000 mi) at 15 knots (28 km/h; 17 mph). The standard ship's company was made up of 6 officers and 113 sailors.

Main armament for a V-class destroyer consisted of four QF 4-inch (101.6 mm) Mark V guns. This was supplemented by a QF 2-pounder gun (with a second installed in January 1942), two twin Lewis gun mountings, a single Lewis gun (later replaced by a 4-barrel Vickers .303 gun), and two torpedo tube sets (initially 3-tube, later replaced by 4-tube sets). Four depth charge chutes were fitted during construction, with two depth charge throwers installed later; the destroyer could carry up to 50 charges.

The ship was laid down as HMS Wallace by J. Samuel White & Co Ltd at Cowes on the Isle of Wight on 10 October 1916, and was launched on 21 May 1917. In July 1917, the ship was renamed Vampire, and was commissioned into the RN on 22 September 1917.

== Operational history ==
=== RN service ===
On entering service, Vampire was initially assigned to the 4th Destroyer Flotilla. After the end of World War I, the destroyer saw service in British waters and the Mediterranean.

=== Transfer to RAN ===
In 1933, it was decided to replace the five S-class destroyers (HMA Ships Stalwart, Success, Swordsman, Tasmania, and Tattoo) and the flotilla leader (HMAS Anzac) on loan to the RAN with newer ships. Vampire, along with three sister ships (the V-class destroyer Vendetta and the W-class destroyers Voyager and Waterhen) and the Scott-class flotilla leader HMS Stuart were selected by the Admiralty for loan to Australia as a flotilla.

The five vessels were paid off from RN service at Portsmouth, England on 11 October 1933, and were commissioned into the RAN on the same day. Less than a week later, the ships left for Australia, arriving in Sydney on 21 December. Vampire was paid off into reserve on 31 January 1934, but was recommissioned for three days in mid-July to be sailed down to Flinders Naval Depot for use as a tender. The destroyer remained in "reserve commission" until 11 May 1938, when she was recommissioned for full service.

=== World War II – Mediterranean ===
Vampire operated in Australian waters until the start of World War II, and on 14 October 1939, joined her sister ships and Stuart (a force that Nazi propaganda minister Joseph Goebbels called "Scrap Iron Flotilla", a moniker the ships quickly adopted) as they were deployed to the Mediterranean Theatre. From her arrival until April 1940, Vampire was primarily assigned to convoy escort duties between Malta and Marseille. The destroyer operated as an escort and anti-submarine patrol ship from the end of April, and escorted the British aircraft carrier HMS Eagle during the Battle of Calabria on 9 July. The only damage sustained by Vampire was the result of near misses and splinters caused by Italian aircraft bombing Eagle: an RN torpedo gunner aboard the destroyer became the first fatality of the war aboard a RAN ship when he died three days later from splinter wounds.

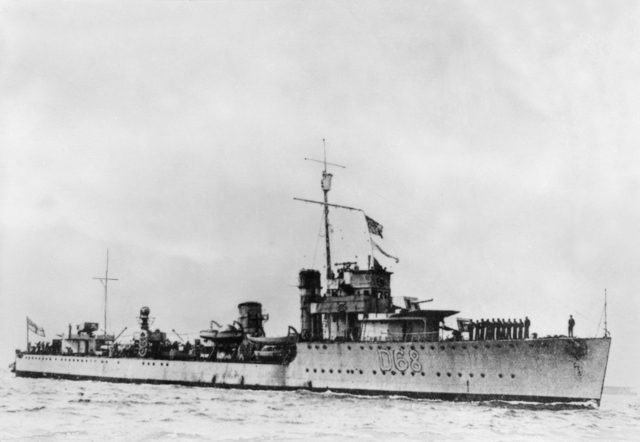
HMAS Vampire, c. 1940

After repairs in Alexandria, Vampire resumed escort and patrol duties, and on several occasions was unsuccessfully used in attempts to lure the Italian fleet to where they could be engaged by the Allies. In late October and early November, the early phases of the Battle of Greece, the destroyer escorted convoys in Greek waters, before being deployed to aid the Western Desert Campaign as an escort. On 20 December, Vampire stripped her engines, forcing the destroyer to dock for repairs. These were completed on 8 January 1941.

Vampire was sent back to Greece, where she operated until May, aiding in the Allied reinforcement (Operation Lustre) and evacuation (Operation Demon). She was then deployed back to the Western Desert Campaign, operating as part of the "Tobruk Ferry Service"; ships transporting supplies and reinforcements to the Allied-controlled, besieged town of Tobruk. However, after two trips, the destroyer had to be removed from service because further engine problems were causing the ship to vibrate excessively at speeds over 16 knots (30 km/h).

The ship sailed to Singapore for major repairs, which lasted until late 1941. In September, Commander William Moran was appointed captain of Vampire.

=== World War II – British Eastern Fleet ===
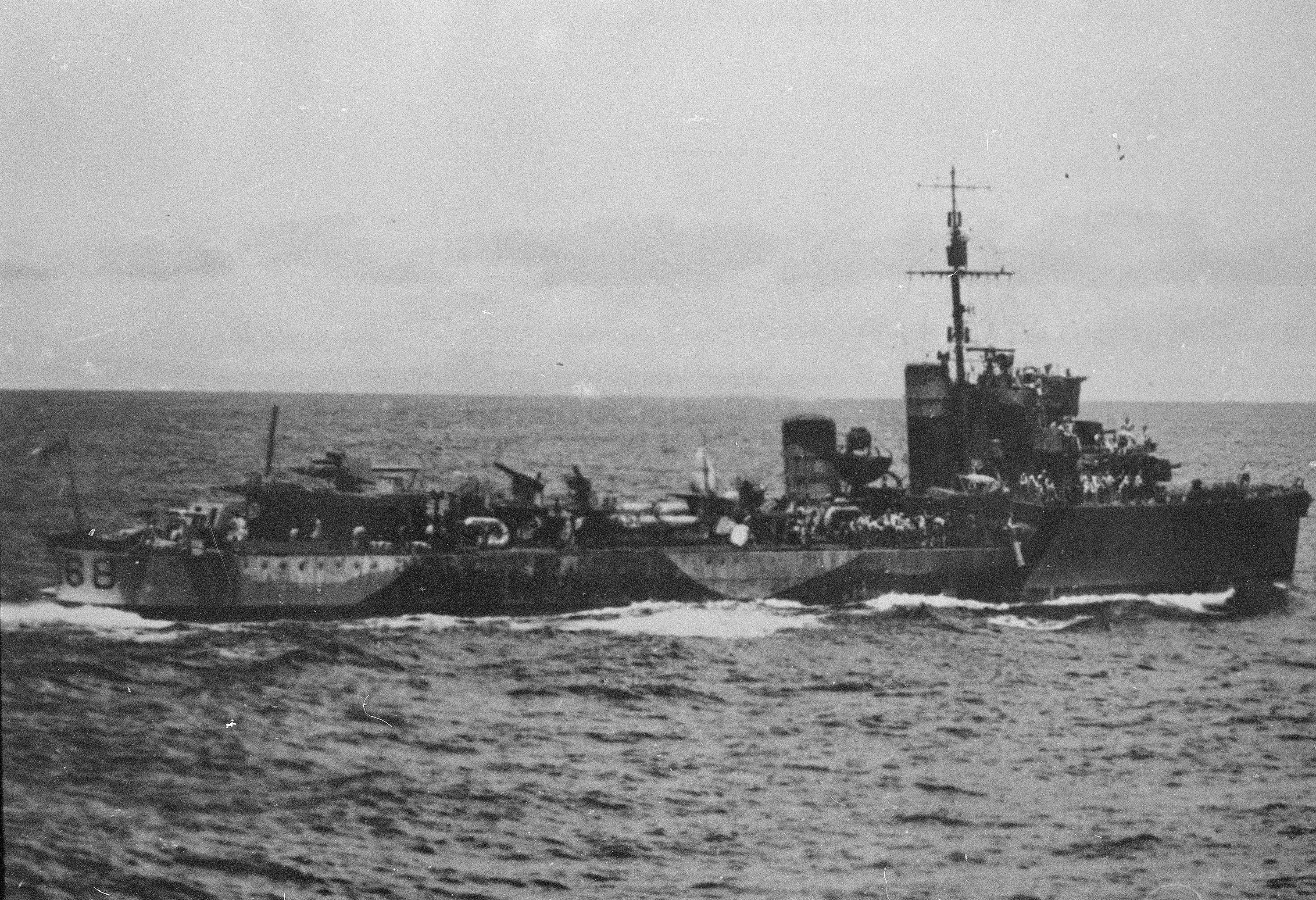
Vampire on convoy escort in the Indian Ocean, 4 March 1942

In December 1941, she joined to the British Eastern Fleet at Colombo, Ceylon. In the first week of December, the battlecruiser HMS Repulse started on a trip to Australia with Vampire and HMS Tenedos as escorts, but the force was recalled. Early in the morning of 8 December (Singapore time), Singapore came under attack by Japanese aircraft. Repulse and the British battleship HMS Prince of Wales, which were in the harbor at the time, shot back with anti-aircraft fire; no planes were shot down, and the ships sustained no damage. After receiving the reports of the attack on Pearl Harbor and invasions of Siam by the Japanese, Force Z (consisting of Prince of Wales and Repulse, escorted by Vampire, Electra, Express, and Tenedos) put to sea at 17:30 hours on 8 December.

At 20:55 hours, Admiral Philips cancelled the operation, and ordered the force to return to Singapore. On the way back, they were spotted and reported by Japanese submarine I-58. The next morning, 10 December, they received a report of Japanese landings at Kuantan, and Express was sent to investigate the area, finding nothing. That afternoon, Prince of Wales and Repulse were attacked and sunk by 85 Japanese aircraft off Kuantan by aircraft from the 22nd Air Flotilla based at Saigon. Vampire rescued 225 of the ships' 2,081 survivors from the sea, and transported them to Singapore.

On 26 January 1942, following reports that an unescorted group of Japanese troopships was sailing near Endau, Malaya, Vampire and HMS Thanet were ordered to intercept. Reaching the Japanese convoy at 02:00 the next morning, the two destroyers found the troopships were protected by the cruiser Sendai and six destroyers. The allied destroyers attempted to escape: Vampire was successful, but Thanet was sunk.

On 11 February, Vampire was attached to Eastern Fleet forces operating in the Indian Ocean. At the start of April, Vampire was ordered to escort the British aircraft carrier HMS Hermes from Ceylon, as the Japanese presence in the area was likely to become dominant.

== Loss ==
Following the Japanese Fast Carrier Task Force's attack on Colombo in early April, Hermes and Vampire were ordered to depart Trincomalee to avoid a follow-up strike. Sailing on 8 April, the two ships avoided the aerial bombing of the port early the next morning, but were spotted and attacked by 85 Japanese Aichi D3A Val dive bombers escorted by 9 Mitsubishi A6M Zero fighter carrier aircraft at 10:35.

Hermes was attacked by 45 bombers and sustained 40 hits or very near misses and was lost within twenty minutes. Vampire came under attack by 16 Vals and claimed to have shot down at least one aircraft but was hit or near missed by all sixteen 250 kg bombs, breaking in half and sinking 10 minutes after Hermes, her ensign the last to submerge. Despite the ferocity of the attack, Vampire's commanding officer and eight sailors were the only fatalities. The survivors from both Hermes and Vampire were recovered by the hospital ship Vita.

Vampire was awarded five battle honours for her wartime service: "Calabria 1940", "Libya 1940–41", "Greece 1941", "Crete 1941", and "Indian Ocean 1941–42".
