= USS Harry F. Bauer =

Robert H. Smith–class destroyer minelayer

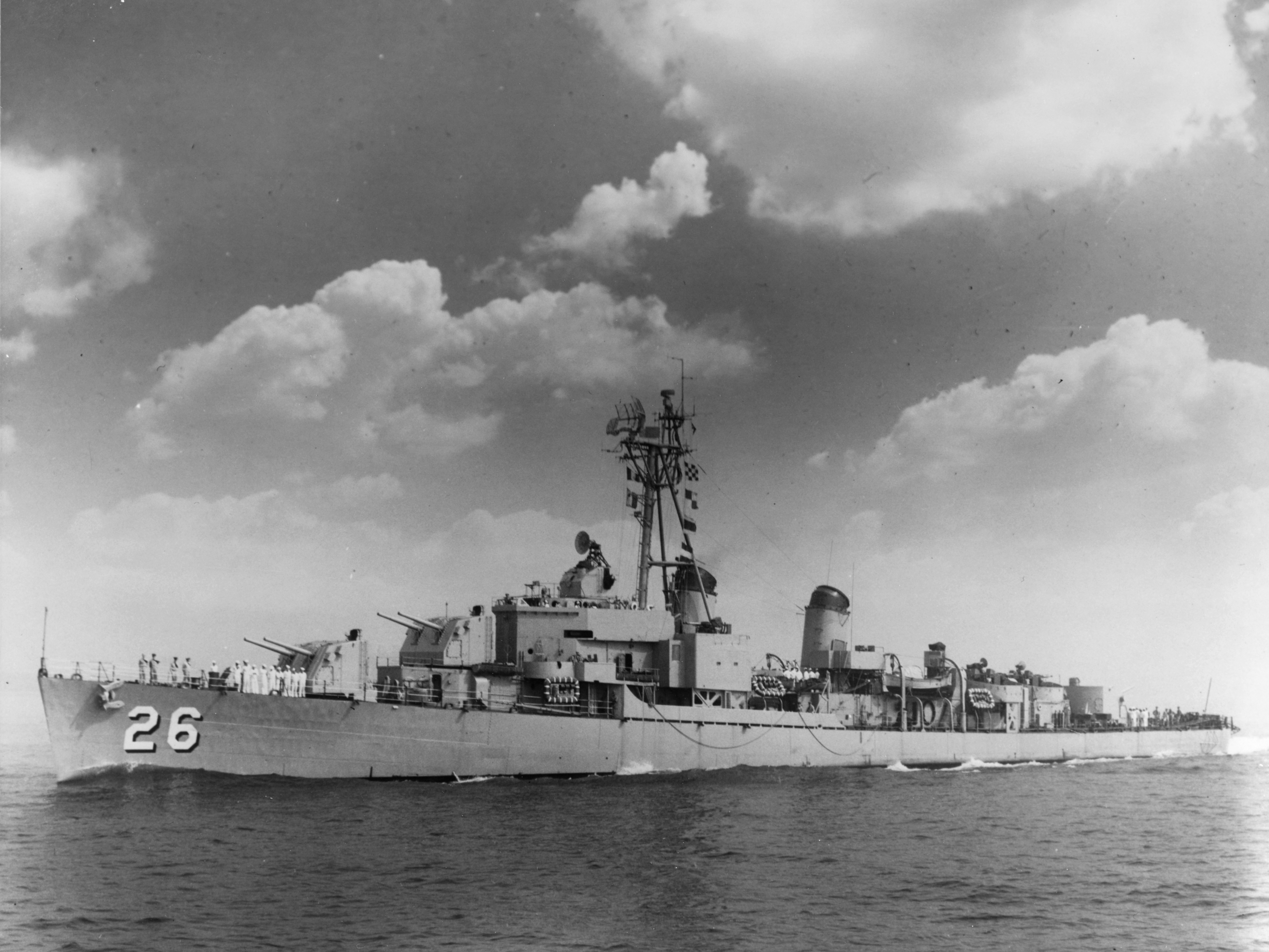
- USS Harry F. Bauer (DM-26) underway during the 1950s

History

United States
- Name: Harry F. Bauer
- Namesake: Harry F. Bauer
- Builder: Bath Iron Works
- Launched: 9 July 1944
- Commissioned: 22 September 1944
- Decommissioned: 12 March 1956
- Stricken: 15 August 1971
- Fate: Sold for scrap, 1 June 1974

General characteristics
- Class & type: Robert H. Smith-class destroyer
- Displacement: 2,200 tons
- Length: 376 ft 6 in (114.76 m)
- Beam: 40 ft 10 in (12.45 m)
- Draft: 18 ft 10 in (5.74 m)
- Speed: 34 knots (63 km/h; 39 mph)
- Complement: 363 officers and enlisted
- Armament: 6 × 5 in (127 mm)/38 cal. guns; 12 × 40 mm guns; 8 × 20 mm cannons; 2 × depth charge tracks; 4 × depth charge projectors

USS Harry F. Bauer (DD-738/DM-26/MMD-26) was a Robert H. Smith-class destroyer minelayer in the United States Navy. She was named for Lieutenant Commander Harry F. Bauer (1904–1942).

Harry F. Bauer was launched as destroyer DD-738 by Bath Iron Works, Bath, Maine, 9 July 1944; sponsored by Mrs. Gladys Boyd Bauer, widow of Lt. Comdr. Bauer; converted to minelayer DM-26 and commissioned on 22 September 1944. The executive officer was Robert M. Morgenthau.

== Namesake ==
Harry Frederick Bauer was born on 17 July 1904 at Camp Thomas in Lytle, Georgia, Bauer, the son of a U. S. Army first sergeant, he graduated from the United States Naval Academy (USNA) in 1927. During his career he served at shore stations, including a tour as instructor at the USNA, and an ensign assigned to duty aboard the USS Arkansas. By 1931 he had been promoted to lieutenant junior grade and continued his service on the Arkansas. During his service on the Arkansas, he was awarded a Letter of Commendation by the Secretary of the Navy. He subsequently served on the USS Babbitt and on the USS Elliot. In June 1934 he was reassigned to the USNA for postgraduate work and as an instructor. In 1936 he was assigned as aide and flag lieutenant to the Commander Cruisers, Scouting Force, and from there he went to the USS Tracy (DD-214) as executive officer. In February 1939 he was assigned to the Office of the Detail Officer at the Bureau of Navigation, Department of the Navy, Washington, D.C. On 1 July 1941 he was promoted to lieutenant commander. He remained in Washington until he assumed command of the high-speed transport USS Gregory on 1 January 1942.

=== Guadalcanal ===
While acting as combat transports for Marines off Guadalcanal during the night of 4–5 September 1942, Gregory and USS Little were returning to their anchorage at Tulagi after transferring a Marine Raider battalion to Savo Island. The night was dark with a low haze obscuring all landmarks, and the ships decided to remain on patrol rather than risk threading their way through the dangerous channel. As they steamed between Guadalcanal and Savo Island at ten knots, three Japanese destroyers (Yūdachi, Hatsuyuki and Murakumo) entered New Georgia Sound undetected to bombard American shore positions. At 00:56 on 5 September, Gregory and Little saw flashes of gunfire which they assumed came from a Japanese submarine until radar showed four targets – apparently a cruiser had also joined the three Japanese destroyers. While the two outgunned ships were debating whether to close for action or depart quietly and undetected, the decision was taken out of their hands. A navy pilot had also seen the gunfire and, assuming it came from a Japanese submarine, dropped a string of five flares almost on top of the two APD's. Gregory and Little, silhouetted against the blackness, were spotted immediately by the Japanese destroyers, who opened fire at 01:00. Gregory brought all her guns to bear but was desperately overmatched and less than 3 minutes after the fatal flares had been dropped was dead in the water and beginning to sink. Two boilers had burst and her decks were a mass of flames. Bauer, himself seriously wounded, gave the word to abandon ship, and Gregory's crew took to the water. Bauer ordered two companions to aid another crewman yelling for help and was never seen again. For his conduct he posthumously received the Silver Star, the Purple Heart, and promotion to commander. His memorial marker is in Arlington National Cemetery.

== Service history ==
Following shakedown training out of Bermuda and minelayer training off Norfolk, Virginia, Harry F. Bauer sailed on 28 November 1944 via the Panama Canal arriving at San Diego, California on 12 December.

=== Iwo Jima ===
After additional training both there and at Pearl Harbor she departed Hawaii on 27 January 1945 as a unit of Transport Group Baker for the invasion of Iwo Jima, next stop in the island campaign toward Japan. As Vice Admiral Richmond K. Turner's invasion troops stormed ashore on 19 February, Harry F. Bauer acted as a picket vessel and carried out an antisubmarine patrol to protect the transports. As the campaign developed, the ship also conducted shore bombardment, destroying several gun emplacements, tanks, and supply dumps.

=== Okinawa ===
She proceeded to Ulithi on 8 March to prepare for the last and largest of the Pacific island operations, the Battle of Okinawa.

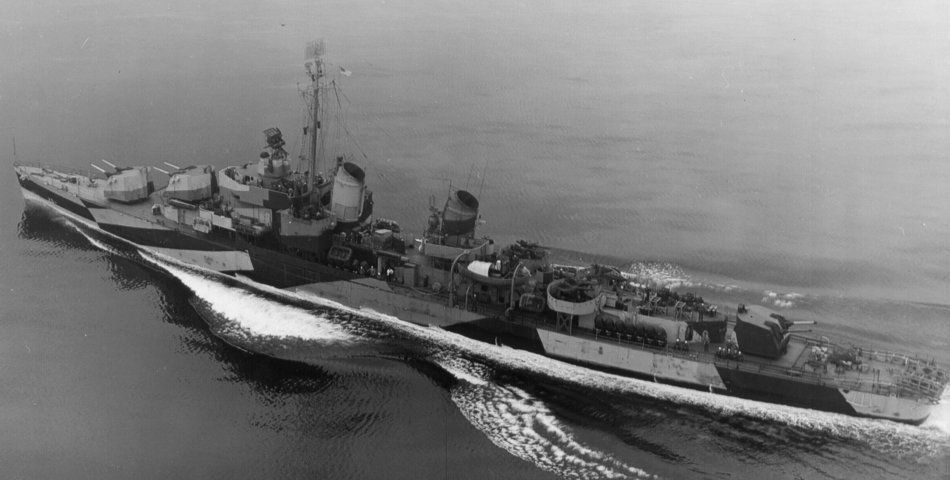
Harry F. Bauer in 1944.

Soon after arrival, (25 March '45) a wave of Japanese aircraft pounded the ship; she survived, shooting down three planes (29 March '45). A torpedo bomber's warhead crashed through the bow, and blew right through the other side; the warhead's fuse failed to detonate (6 April '45). The ship was attacked again by another squadron of Japanese planes, resulting in splashing three more craft; assisting in two others. (20 April '45) The ship warded off another series of aerial attacks, shooting down one more plane. (27 April '45)

==== Hit by kamikaze ====
Another wave of kamikaze suicide planes attacked the Bauer. In a suicide dive, succumbing to intense fire, a kamikaze crashed onto the stern boat deck, slicing through a row of depth charges on the fantail that were cast into the sea. By another miracle, none exploded. Two more enemy aircraft were shot down that day. (11 May '45) A pack of submarines began their assault, resulting in the Bauer’s assist in the destruction of one of the subs. (27 May '45) In early June, the fleet was in high alert for Typhoon Connie bound for Okinawa (5 June '45). The typhoon veered away, instead blasting Halsey's Third Fleet with sixty foot seas and 150 knot winds. This was just the calm before the real storm. The next day the Japanese kamikazes counter-attacked. A large squadron of enemy planes struck. Pummeled and bruised, the Bauer gallantly fought back, knocking down three more suicide planes. One of the suicide dive bombers glanced off the ship's superstructure. The ship was beaten up, but still afloat and under steam. Apparently, during the battle one of the ship's below-waterline amidships fuel tanks had been ruptured. The crew believed they must have been hit by shrapnel; two compartments were flooded. Unbeknownst to the officers and their shipmates, the last dive bomber had penetrated with an unexploded bomb in the fuel tank.

For the Bauer’s gallant action, she received a Presidential Citation: "for extraordinary heroism in action" to maintain a "seaworthy, fighting ship, complemented by skilled and courageous officers and men… achieving a notable record of gallantry in combat, attesting the teamwork of her entire company and enhancing the finest traditions of the United States Naval Service".

The following week the Bauer escorted her destroyer sister-ship, the USS J. William Ditter back to safety in the nearby Kerama Retto islands. (about 20 miles south west of Okinawa). There the Bauer had her damage surveyed. An Associated Press article describes the event:

After repairs at Leyte, Harry F. Bauer arrived at Okinawa on 15 August, the day of the Japanese surrender. With the prospect of massive minesweeping in Japanese waters incident to the occupation, she sailed 20 August for the East China Sea, where she engaged in minesweeping operations until arriving Sasebo 28 October. Sailing for the United States 1 December she arrived San Diego 22 December.

=== Post World War II and fate ===
Sailing to Norfolk 8 January 1946, Harry F. Bauer began operations with the Atlantic Fleet. These consisted of antisubmarine cruises in the Atlantic Ocean and Caribbean Sea, tactical training and fleet maneuvers. During October–November 1948 she took part in 2nd Fleet exercises in the Atlantic, and in June–July 1949 participated in a Naval Academy training cruise with USS Missouri.

In 1950 Harry F. Bauer made her first cruise to the Mediterranean Sea, departing 9 September and returning to Charleston, South Carolina 1 February 1951. During the years that followed she continued with tactical operations, that took her to the Caribbean and Northern Europe. She ended active steaming in September 1955 and decommissioned 12 March 1956 at Charleston, entering the Atlantic Reserve Fleet, Philadelphia, Pennsylvania. Harry F. Bauer was struck from the Naval Vessel Register on 15 August 1971 and sold for scrap on 1 June 1974.

Harry F. Bauer received a Presidential Unit Citation for the Okinawan campaign and four battle stars for World War II service.

As of 2009, no other ship has been named Harry F. Bauer.
