= Shiratsuyu-class destroyer =

Class of destroyers of the Imperial Japanese Navy

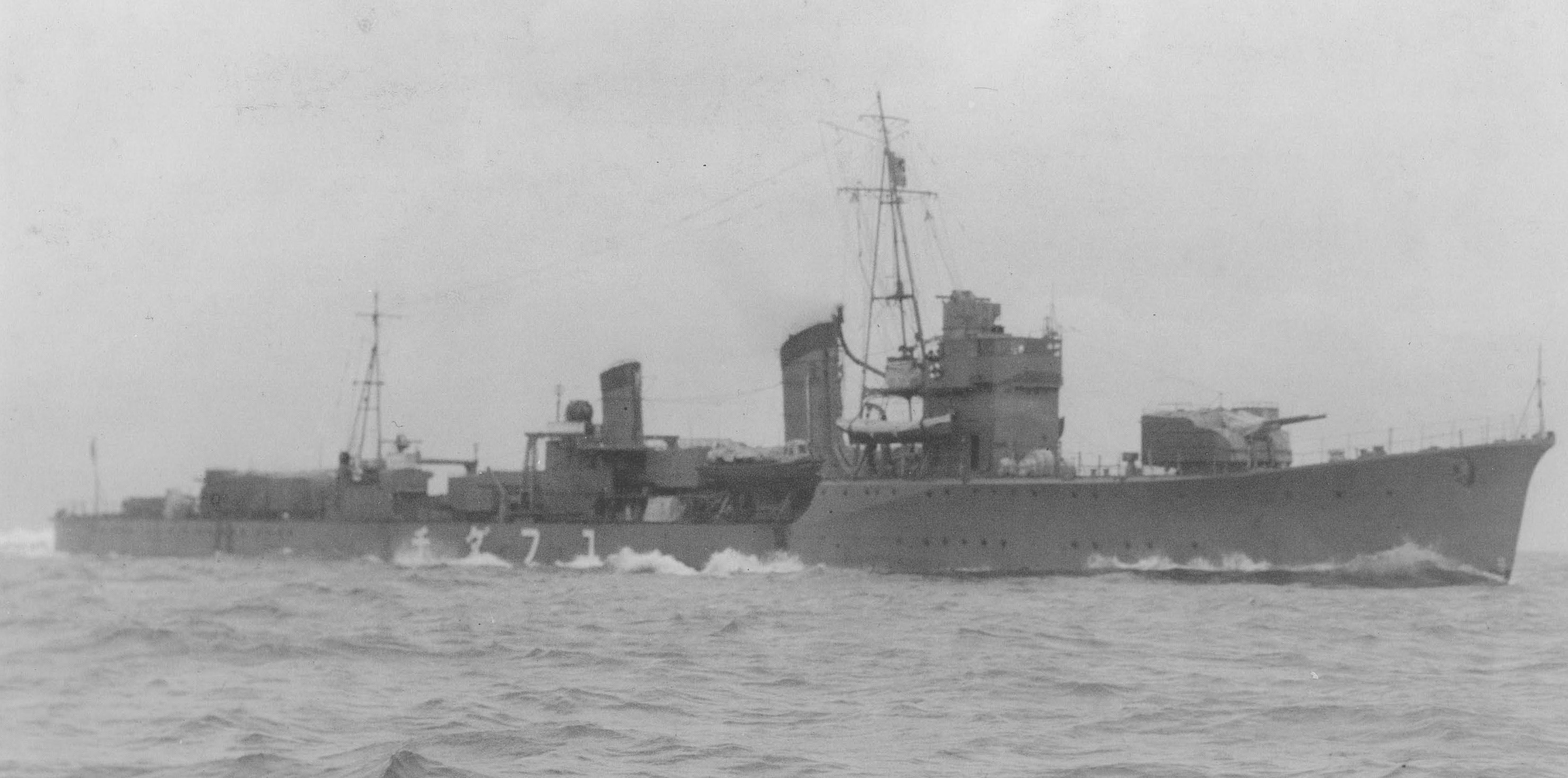
- Yūdachi on sea trials, 30 November 1936

Class overview
- Name: Shiratsuyu class
- Builders: Uraga Dock Company (4); Sasebo Naval Arsenal (2); Maizuru Naval Arsenal (2); Fujinagata Shipyards (2)
- Operators: Imperial Japanese Navy
- Preceded by: Hatsuharu class
- Succeeded by: Asashio class
- Built: 1933–1937
- In commission: 1936–1945
- Completed: 10
- Lost: 10

General characteristics
- Type: Destroyer
- Displacement: 1,685 long tons (1,712 t) standard
- Length: 103.5 m (340 ft) pp; 107.5 m (352 ft 8 in) waterline; 109.6 m (359 ft 7 in) overall
- Beam: 9.9 m (32 ft 6 in)
- Draught: 3.5 m (11 ft 6 in)
- Propulsion: 2 shaft Kampon geared turbines; 3 Kanpon boilers, 42,000 hp (31,000 kW)
- Speed: 34 knots (39 mph; 63 km/h) (original), 33.3 knots (modified)
- Range: 4,000 nmi (7,400 km) @ 18 kn (33 km/h)
- Complement: 180
- Armament: 5 × Type 3 127 mm 50 caliber naval guns (2×2, 1×1); 2 × Type 93 13mm machine guns (2×1); 8 × 610 mm (24 in) torpedo tubes (2×4); 16 × Type 93 torpedoes; 16 × depth charges

The Shiratsuyu-class destroyers (白露型駆逐艦, Shiratsuyugata kuchikukan) were a class of ten 1st Class destroyers of the Imperial Japanese Navy in service before and during World War II, during which all ten were sunk.

== Background ==
The initial six Shiratsuyu-class destroyers were modified versions of the Hatsuharu class, and had been originally planned as the final six vessels of that class under the "Circle-One" Naval Expansion Plan.

However, design issues with the Hatsuharu-class ships, notably their "top-heavy" design relative to their small displacement, resulted in extensive modifications, to the point where the final six vessels on order were named as a separate class. The redesign caused the new class to exceed the limitations imposed by the 1930 London Naval Treaty. An additional four vessels were ordered under the ”Circle-Two Naval Expansion Plan of fiscal 1934, and all vessels were completed by 1937. While the process of only giving numbers rather than names has ceased in 1928, these ships also bore the numbers Dai-65 to Dai-74.

As with the Hatsuharu class, the Shiratsuyu-class destroyers were designed to accompany the Japanese main striking force and to conduct both day and night torpedo attacks against the United States Navy as it advanced across the Pacific Ocean, according to Japanese naval strategic projections. Despite being one of the most powerful classes of destroyers in the world at the time of their completion, none survived the Pacific War.

== Design ==
In general layout, the Shiratsuyu-class vessels closely resembled the Ariake sub-class, or final version of the Hatsuharu class, differing only in the lower and more compact bridge design and the shape and inclination of the funnels. The hull retained the general configuration of the Hatsuharu class with a long forecastle with a pronounced flare to improve sea-keeping at high speeds by adding buoyancy and reducing the spray and water coming over the deck, but with a shorter forecastle and longer stern. The same engines were used as on the Hatsuharu class, and due to their greater displacement and draft, the Shiratsuyu-class could only attain 34 knots.

The Shiratsuyu class were the first Japanese warships to be completed with quadruple torpedo mounts and telephone communications to the torpedo station. As with the Hatsuharu class. the torpedo launchers were given a protective shield to allow for use in heavy weather and to protect against splinter damage.

=== Propulsion ===
The Shiratsuyu class, as with the previous Hatsuharu class, carried two sets of Kampon geared turbines, one for each shaft. Each set consisted of one low-pressure and one high-pressure turbine, plus a cruise turbine connected to the high-pressure turbine. The LP and HP turbines were connected to the propeller shaft by a two-pinion reduction gear. Each propeller had a diameter of 3.05 m (10.0 ft) and a pitch of 3.7 m (12 ft). The total horsepower of the Shiratsuyu class was only 42,000 hp (31,000 kW) compared to the 50,000 hp (37,000 kW) of their Fubuki-class predecessors, but the machinery was significantly lighter and more powerful on a unit basis. The Shiratsuyus' machinery weighed only 106 tonnes (104 long tons; 117 short tons) compared to the 144 tonnes (142 long tons; 159 short tons) of the Fubuki class, or 396 shaft horsepower per tonne versus 347 shaft horsepower per tonne for the older ships.

Similarly the three Kampon Type Ro-Gō boilers used in the Shiratsuyu-class ships weighed 50 tonnes (49 long tons; 55 short tons) in comparison to the 51 tonnes (50 long tons; 56 short tons) boilers used in the Fubuki class, but produced 14,000 hp (10,000 kW) each while the older boilers produced 12,500 hp (9,300 kW). This gave a ratio of 3.6 kg per shaft horsepower for the Shiratsuyu class compared to the 4.1 kg per shaft horsepower of their predecessors. The newer design of boilers initially used steam pressurized to 20-bar (290 psi), just like the older models, but used superheating to improve efficiency while the older boilers simply used saturated steam.

A single 100 kW turbo-generator was fitted behind the reduction gears in a separate compartment and two 40 kW diesel generators were located between the propeller shafts. As initially completed the Shiratsuyu class had a range of 4,000 nautical miles (7,400 km) at a speed of 18 knots (33 km/h) with 460 tonnes (450 long tons; 510 short tons) of fuel.

=== Armament ===
The Shiratsuyu-class destroyers used the same 50 caliber 12.7 cm/50 Type 3 naval gun as the Fubuki class, but all turrets could elevate to 75° to give the main guns a minimal ability to engage aircraft. During the war the single turret in "X" position was removed on all surviving ships and replaced with a triple Type 96 anti-aircraft gun, while other guns were added so that between 13 and 21 (depending on the individual vessel) of this calibre were eventually carried in double and triple mounts. Although these powered mounts were unsatisfactory because their traverse and elevation speeds were too slow to engage high-speed aircraft, more single mounts were fitted to ships in the last year of the war. Four 13 mm guns were also added.

The 61 cm Type 90 torpedo was mounted in quadruple tube Type 92 launchers, derived from the twin tube Type 89 launcher used in the Takao-class heavy cruisers. Shields were fitted to both the torpedo mounts and lockers to protect them from the weather and from strafing aircraft. Initially the shields were made from Duralumin to save weight, but these quickly corroded and had to be replaced. "NiCrMo" steel, taken from the air chambers of obsolete torpedoes, 3 mm (0.12 in) in thickness, was chosen for the new shields to save weight. It was traversed by an electro-hydraulic system and could traverse 360° in twenty-five seconds. If the backup manual system was used the time required increased to two minutes. Eight reloads were carried, and each tube could be reloaded in twenty-three seconds using the endless wire and winch provided. Because of the weight of the extra guns added, one set of reloads for the torpedo tubes was removed, together with the minelaying and minesweeping gear. By the start of the Pacific War, all ships of the class were using Type 93 torpedoes.

Only eighteen depth charges were initially carried in a rack at the stern, but this increased to thirty-six after the autumn of 1942, with four depth charge throwers. Apparently no sonar or hydrophones were fitted until after the outbreak of the war when the Type 93 sonar and Type 93 hydrophones were mounted.

=== Radar ===
Radar was not installed on the surviving ships of this class until late in the war, possibly as late as 1944. Surviving ships were given a Type 22 radar on the foremast, a Type 13 on the mainmast and a Type E-27 radar countermeasures device was carried high on the foremast.

=== Umikaze subclass ===
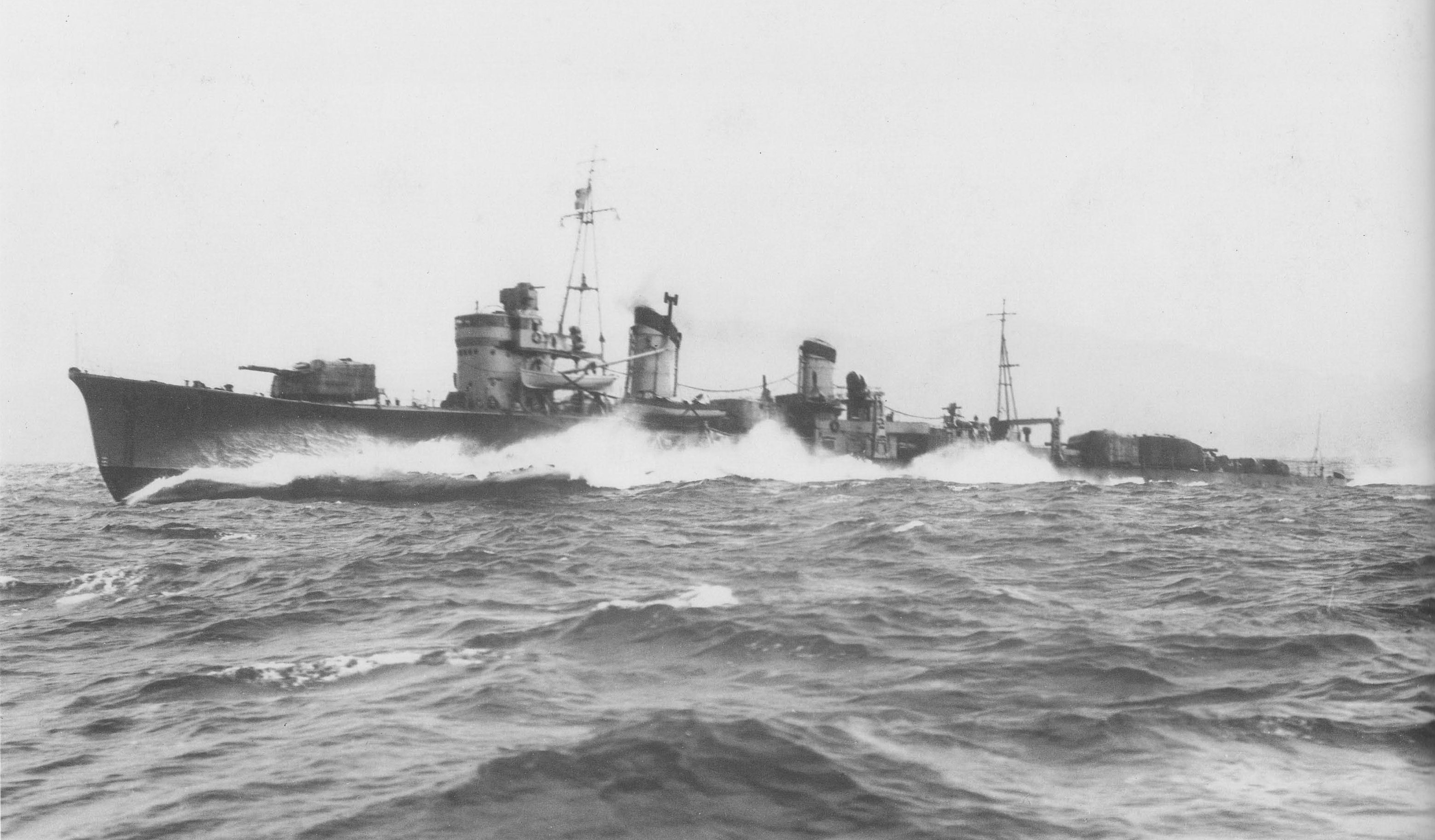
Umikaze on sea trials, April 1937

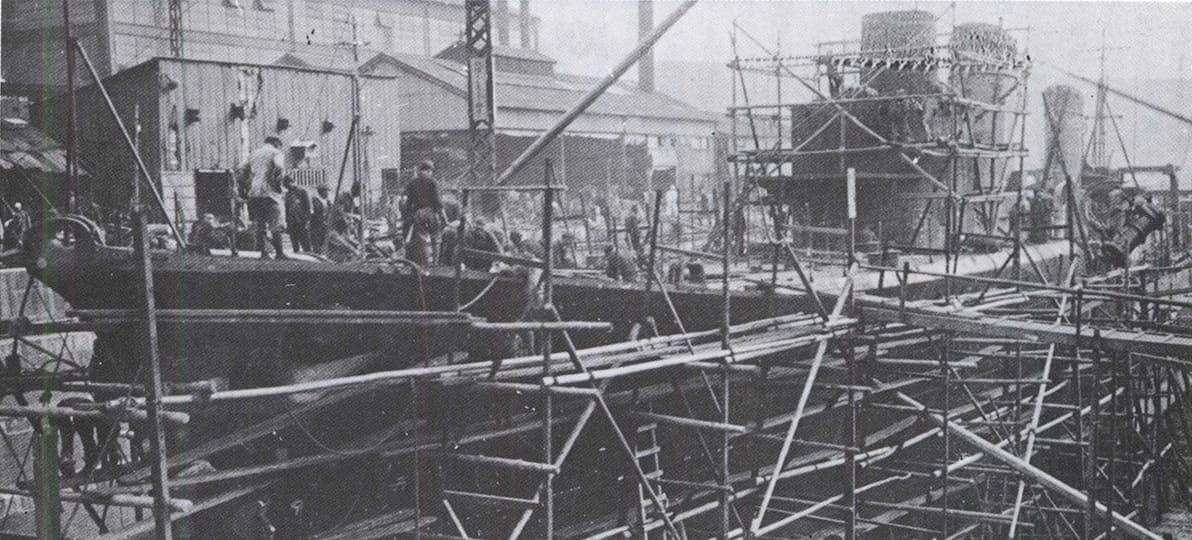
The reconstruction of Harusame

After the first six ships of the class started construction, the 'Fourth Fleet Incident' occurred, where a typhoon badly damaged several Japanese warships, including shearing off the bows of the destroyers Hatsuyuki and Yūgiri, which revealed that a number of Japanese warship classes had serious design flaws which made them top-heavy and structurally unstable. Because of this, another four ships of the class were to be ordered with several design changes. Welding was used as opposed to riveting in construction, increasing the class's structural stability and integrity while reducing unnecessary weight. The most visually distinct change was that the bridge was changed to be more rounded and circular in appearance, decreasing wind resistance and weight while improving flagship accommodations. This bridge design was used as the basis of the following Asashio and Kagerō class destroyers.

==== Reconstruction of Harusame ====
On 24 January 1943, Harusame was blown in half by a torpedo from the submarine USS Wahoo, and was beached to avoid sinking. The surviving back half of the ship, with all the machinery required to make the ship move, was towed to Kure and rebuilt. Similarly to the Umikaze subclass, her rebuilt forward half was heavily welded to reduce weight and increase structural soundness, the interior was changed to become more efficient, and her new bridge was the most visually-apparent change, having been rebuilt with a unique bridge differing from the rest of her sisterships which more resembled a Yūgumo class destroyer.

== List of ships ==
Ships of the Shiratsuyu class
Ship	Kanji	Shipyard	Laid down	Launched	Completed	Fate
Shiratsuyu	白露, 'white dew'	Sasebo Naval Arsenal	14 November 1933	5 April 1935	20 August 1936	Collision 15 June 1944 at 09°09′N 126°51′E
Shigure	時雨, 'autumn shower'	Uraga Dock Company	9 December 1933	18 May 1935	7 September 1936	Torpedoed by USS Blackfin in Gulf of Siam, 24 January 1945 at 06°00′N 103°48′E
Murasame	村雨, 'scattered showers'	Fujinagata Shipyards	1 February 1934	20 June 1935	7 January 1937	Sunk in action by USS Waller, 6 March 1943 at 08°03′S 157°13′E
Yūdachi	夕立, 'evening thunder shower in summer'	Sasebo Naval Arsenal	16 October 1934	21 June 1936	7 January 1937	Sunk in action 13 November 1942 at 09°14′S 159°52′E
Harusame	春雨, 'spring shower'	Maizuru Naval Arsenal	3 February 1935	21 September 1935	26 August 1937	Air attack NW of Manokwari, New Guinea, 8 June 1944 at 00°05′S 132°45′E
Samidare	五月雨, 'early summer rain'	Uraga Dock Company	19 December 1934	6 July 1935	29 January 1937	Torpedoed by USS Batfish near Palau, 25 August 1944 at 08°10′N 134°38′E
Umikaze	海風, 'sea breeze'	Maizuru Naval Arsenal	4 May 1935	27 November 1936	31 May 1937	Torpedoed by USS Guardfish at Truk Atoll, 1 February 1944 at 07°10′N 151°43′E
Yamakaze	山風, 'wind from the hills'	Uraga Dock Company	25 May 1935	21 February 1936	30 June 1937	Torpedoed by USS Nautilus SE of Yokosuka, 25 June 1942 at 34°34′N 140°26′E
Kawakaze	江風, 'wind on the river'	Fujinagata Shipyards	25 April 1935	1 November 1936	30 April 1937	Sunk in action 6 August 1943 at 07°50′S 156°54′E
Suzukaze	涼風, 'cool breeze of summer'	Uraga Dock Company	9 July 1935	11 March 1937	31 August 1937	Torpedoed by USS Skipjack NNW of Pohnpei, 25 January 1944 at 08°51′N 157°10′E

== Operational history ==
10 ships of the class were built between August 1936 and August 1937. Because of this, all ships of the class saw some degree of participation in the second Sino-Japanese war, made up of convoy escorting and patrol duty, and even the occasional shore bombardment, but none saw any major naval battles against enemy warships.

All 10 ships were still afloat by the start of WW2 for Japan, and would immediately take up convoy escorting and patrol duty to assist in the Japanese capture of the Philippines and Dutch East Indies. It was in the latter campaign that the class began to see their first actions against enemy warships, starting when on 12 January 1942, the Yamakaze helped to sink the Dutch minelayer Prins Van Oranje, then on the 11th of February Yamakaze sank the American submarine USS Shark with gunfire. From 27 February to 1 March, several ships of the class took action at the battle of the Java Sea, during which Kawakaze and Yamakaze helped to sink the destroyer HMS Encounter, while Murasame helped to capture the hospital ship SS Op Ten Noort, escorting her to Singapore where she was converted into the prison ship Tenno Maru.

In May, Shiratsuyu and Shigure escorted aircraft carriers at the battle of the Coral Sea, while all 10 ships saw escorting roles during the battle of Midway. At the end of June, Yamakaze became the class's first loss when she was hit by two torpedoes from the submarine USS Nautilus, blew up, and sank with all hands. Afterwards, it was off the Guadalcanal campaign, which saw the class take part in dozens of troop and supply transport runs and several notable engagements. In August, Kawakaze scored another victory when she located a trio of American destroyers, and launched a spread of six torpedoes that hit and sank the destroyer USS Blue. In September, Umikaze and Suzukaze participated in several bombardments of Henderson Field and, and in the latter's case the sinking of the patrol boat USS YP-346, Shiratsuyu helped to sink the fleet tug USS Seminole and the patrol boat YP-284, while Yūdachi helped to sink the fast transport ships USS Gregory and USS Little, before in October several ships of the class escorted aircraft carriers during the battle of Santa Cruz.

In November, Murasame, Yūdachi, Samidare, and Harusame took part in the first naval battle of Guadalcanal. Early into the action, Harusame helped to sink the destroyer USS Cushing before turning away from the battle. Yūdachi survived a gunfight with the light cruiser USS Juneau and hit her with three 5-inch (127 mm) shells, but she was later ambushed by the destroyer USS Sterett and disabled by shell hits, being abandoned and - after a failed scuttling attempt - finished off by gunfire from the heavy cruiser USS Portland. Murasame and Samidare joined the battle late, but charged the light cruiser USS Helena, both taking shell hits in turn, then helped to sink the destroyer USS Monssen. Only Samidare continued into the second battle, during which she engaged an American destroyer flotilla and torpedoed and sank the destroyer USS Walke. Two weeks later, Kawakaze and Suzukaze engaged US cruisers at the battle of Tassafaronga. Suzukaze could not fire her torpedoes as she was forced to dodge torpedo spreads, but Kawakaze unleashed a full spread of 8 type 93 torpedoes, one of which hit and crippled the heavy cruiser USS Pensacola.

In December, Kawakaze and Suzukaze sank the US patrol torpedo boat PT-44, with the usual transport and escort missions ensuing. With the start of 1943, Harusame was crippled by a torpedo from the submarine USS Wahoo which detonated her main battery and blasted off the entire forward half of the ship up to the main funnel. Harusame was beached to avoid fully sinking and was towed from Truk to Yokosuka and spent nearly a year being reconstructed. In February, the Japanese decided to retreat from Guadalcanal, with 20 destroyers, including Kawakaze, Murasame, and Samidare, evacuating over 10,000 troops. During the evacuation, Kawakaze sank the torpedo boats PT-37 and PT-111. In March, Murasame helped to sink the submarine USS Grampus, but she was shortly afterwards caught by US warships at the battle of the Blackett Strait and sunk by gunfire from the light cruisers USS Denver and USS Montpelier. Days later, Samidare probably helped to sink the submarine USS Triton. (Note: There remains a small possibility that Grampus was sunk by land based aircraft, but depth charge attacks by Murasame and Minegumo remain the probable cause for the sub's loss) (Note: Triton's loss is not known for sure, but a series of attacks by Samidare, Satsuki, CH-22, and CH-24 are the most likely candidates.) The class would exclusively see troop transport missions until the 6 July, when at the battle of Kula Gulf, Suzukaze helped to sink the light cruiser Helena.

One ship of the class, the Shigure, had failed to see action up to this point, but at the start of 1943 she was captained by the experienced Tameichi Hara and underwent several months of training. In August, Shigure and Kawakaze were enacting a troop transport run when they were ambushed by the destroyer USS Dunlap, Craven, and Maury in what became known as the battle of Vella Gulf. Kawakaze was sunk by gunfire and torpedoes, bringing an end to her rampage, but Shigure survived with a dud torpedo hit to her rudder and escaped overloaded with survivors. (Note: It was not known that Shigure was hit by a dud torpedo until November of 1943 when she was under refit, they discovered a hole in her rudder. Captain Hara recalled hearing a loud thud aft of the ship during the battle, and put 2 and 2 together) A week later, Shigure assisted in fending off US destroyers from a troop convoy at the battle off Horaniu, and in October, Shigure and Samidare both helped to fend off US destroyers at the battle of Vella Lavella, during which a torpedo from Samidare crippled the destroyer USS Selfridge, blowing off her entire bow. At the battle of the Empress Augusta Bay a month later, Shiratsuyu, Shigure, and Samidare all engaged a US cruiser destroyer force with torpedoes, one of Samidare's crippled the destroyer USS Foote and blew off her stern, but in turn Samidare was hit by three 6-inch (152 mm) shells and collided with Shiratsuyu, while Shigure as usual was undamaged. Due to surviving the entire Solomon Islands campaign without losing a single man in combat or ever being critically damaged, she was heavily publicized in wartime propaganda and Captain Hara was hailed as a war hero, making Shigure crucial to Japanese moral.

Immediately into 1944, Harusame was finally recommissioned, but in turn the class suffered two losses. In January, Suzukaze was torpedoed and sunk by the submarine USS Skipjack, while in February Umikaze was sunk by the submarine USS Guardfish. In June, the remaining 4 ships of the class escorted aircraft carriers at the battle of the Philippine Sea, but shortly afterwards Shiratsuyu was sunk in a collision with the troop transport Seiyo Maru, in July Harusame was sunk by land based aircraft, making her the only ship of the class to be sunk by air attacks, while in August Samidare ran aground, and before she could be refloated she was torpedoed and sunk by the submarine USS Batfish.

This left the lucky Shigure as the only remaining ship of the class still afloat. In October, Shigure served in Admiral Nishimura's fleet at the battle of the Surigao Strait, part of the overall battle of Leyte Gulf, and when the force was ambushed by a US battleline, Shigure took an 8-inch (203 mm) shell hit but survived as the only ship of the Southern Force to escape sinking. The next month while returning to mainland Japan, Shigure assisted by escort vessels sank the submarine USS Growler, and survived into 1945. However, at the end of January she was sent to replace the destroyer Yukikaze on escorting duties, but while underway was hit by a torpedo from the submarine USS Blackfin, finally bringing an end to the fortune ship, although she did sink very slowly allowing for most of her crew to survive. After the war, Captain Hara published his book "Japanese Destroyer Captain", an autobiography delving into his naval career, with heavy focus on his time as Captain of Shigure. (Note: Yukikaze was the other fortune ship which was important to Japanese moral. Unlike Shigure, Yukikaze survived the war without being hit by a single bomb, shell, or torpedo. Shigure's sinking is one such instance of a running joke among modern naval historians that Yukikaze was a "luck vampire", surviving battles completely undamaged while other ships blew up and sank around her)

== Gallery ==
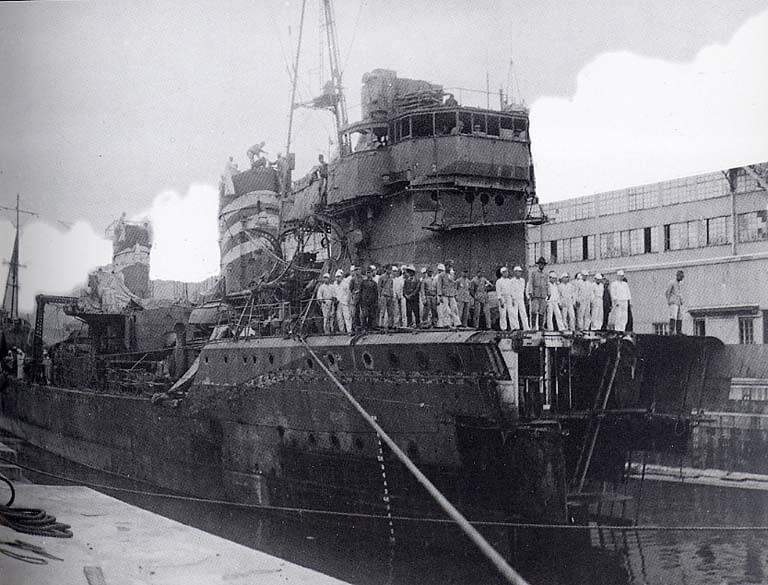
Shiratsuyu

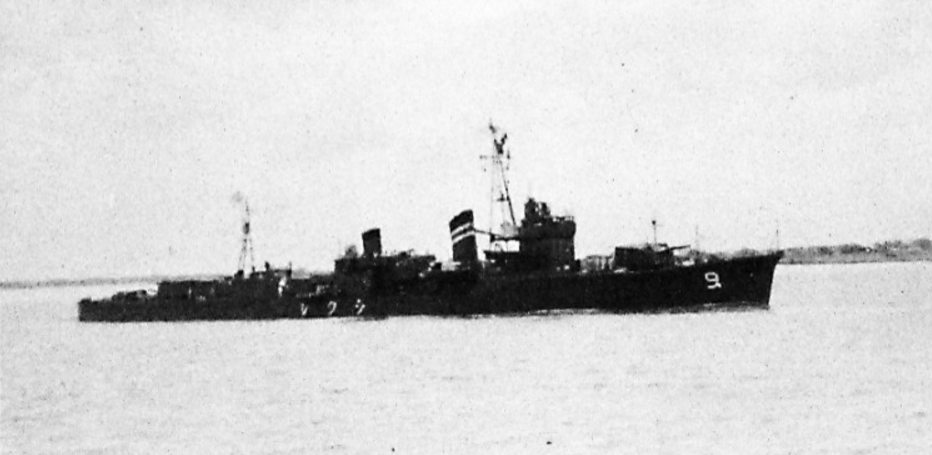
Shigure

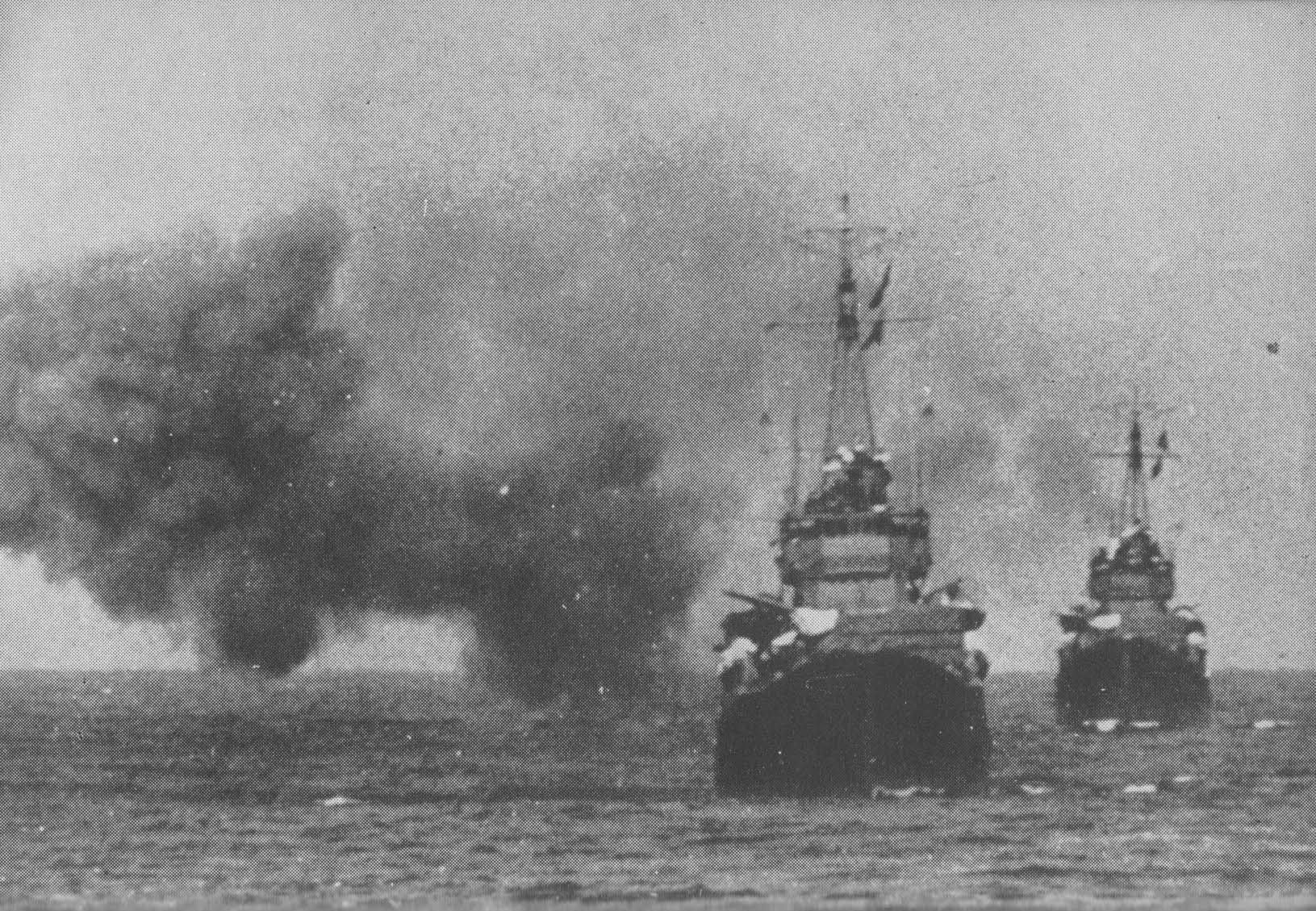
Shigure and Shiratsuyu

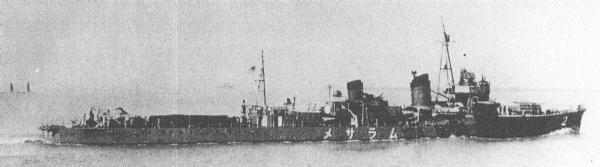
Murasame

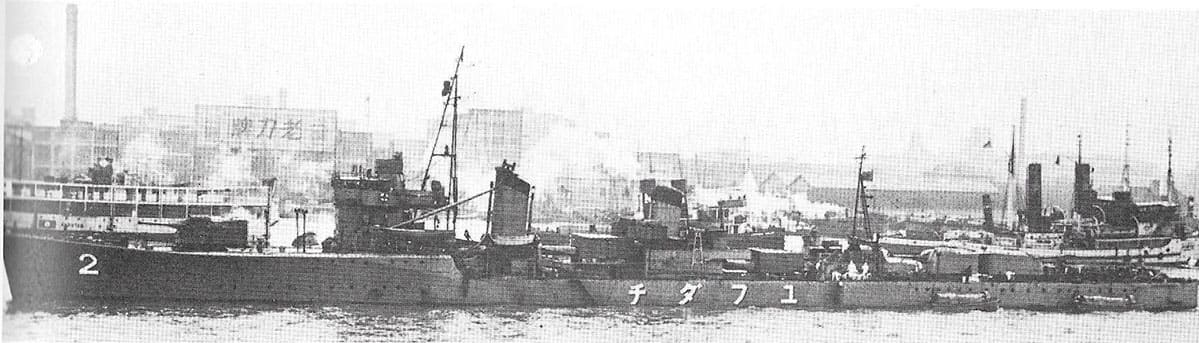
Yūdachi

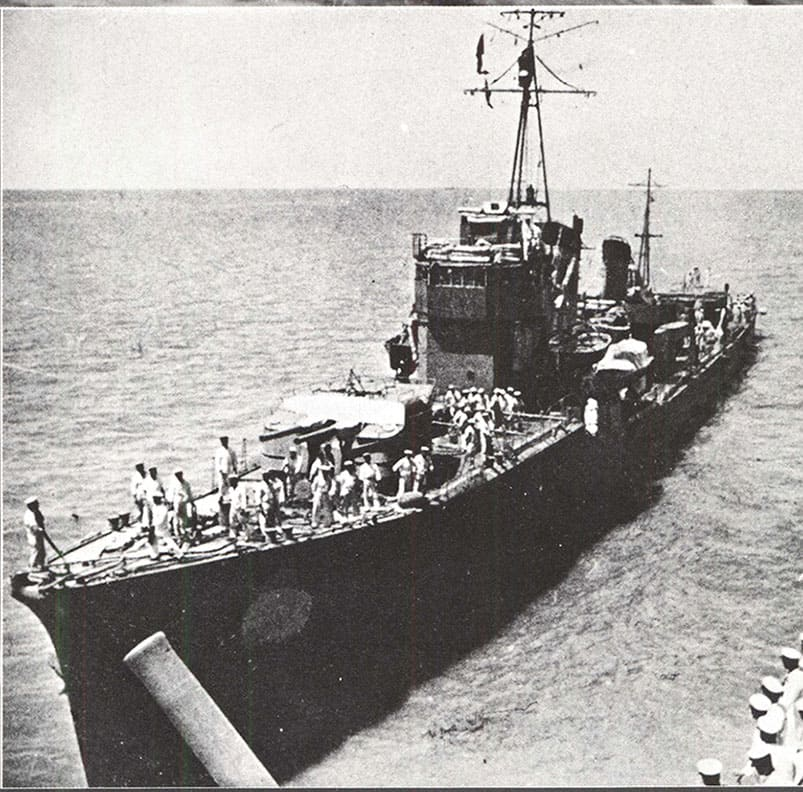
Samidare

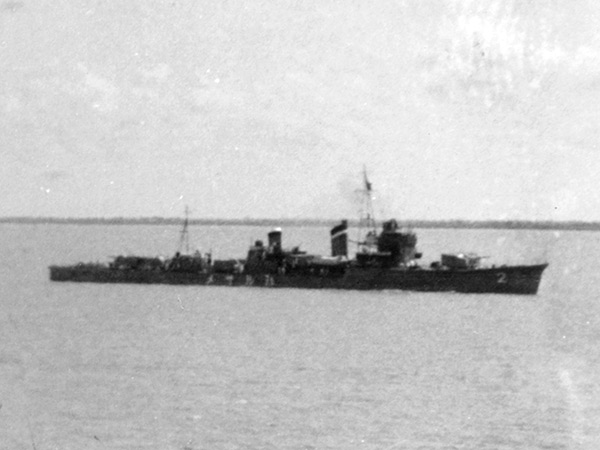
Harusame

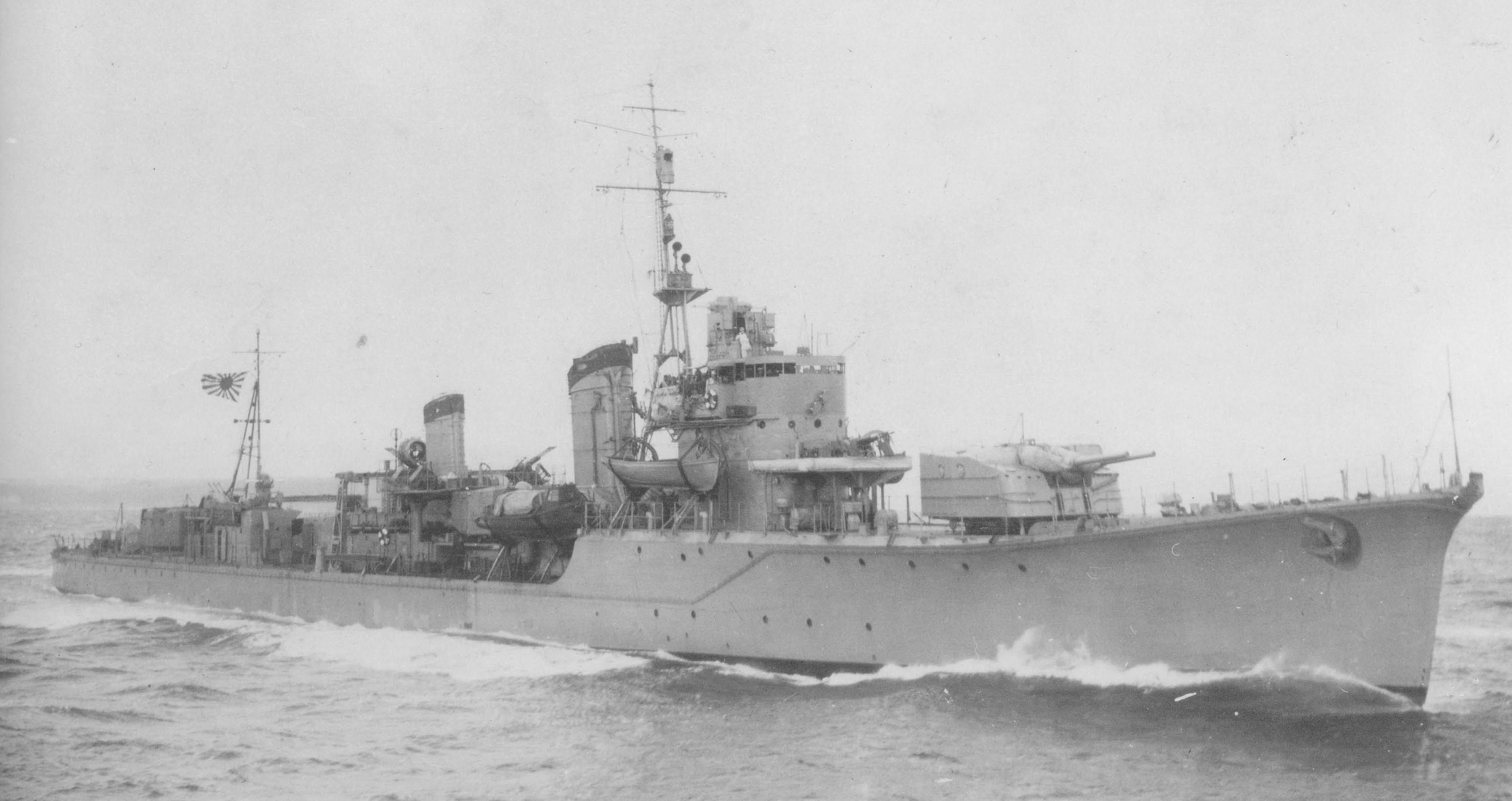
Harusame after reconstruction

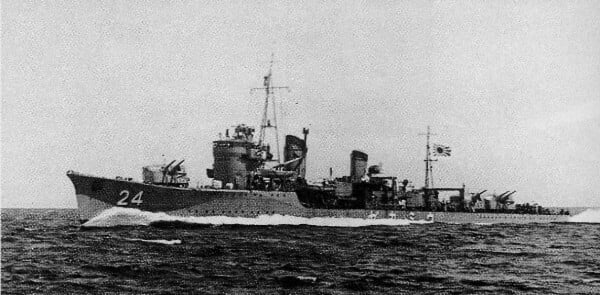
Umikaze

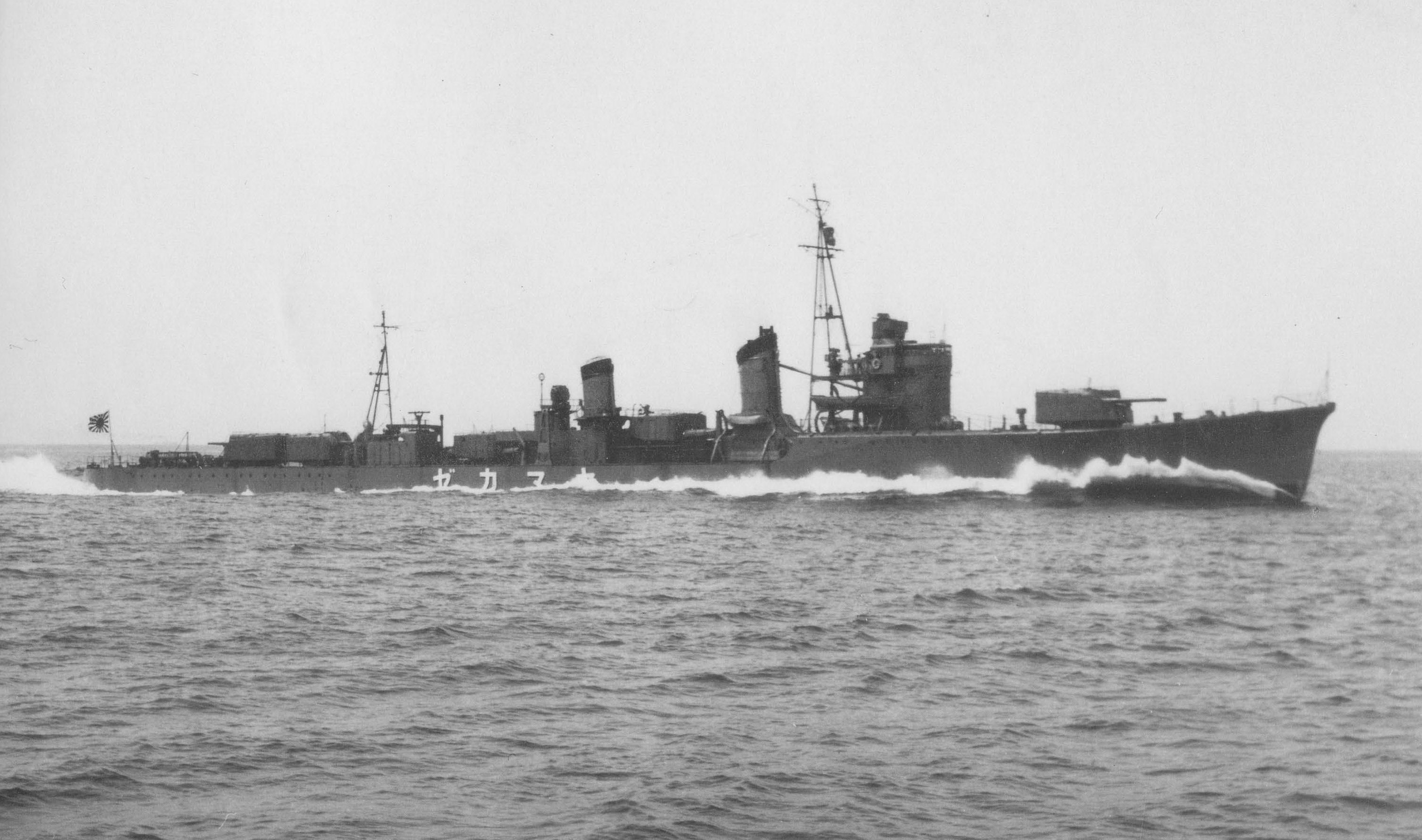
Yamakaze

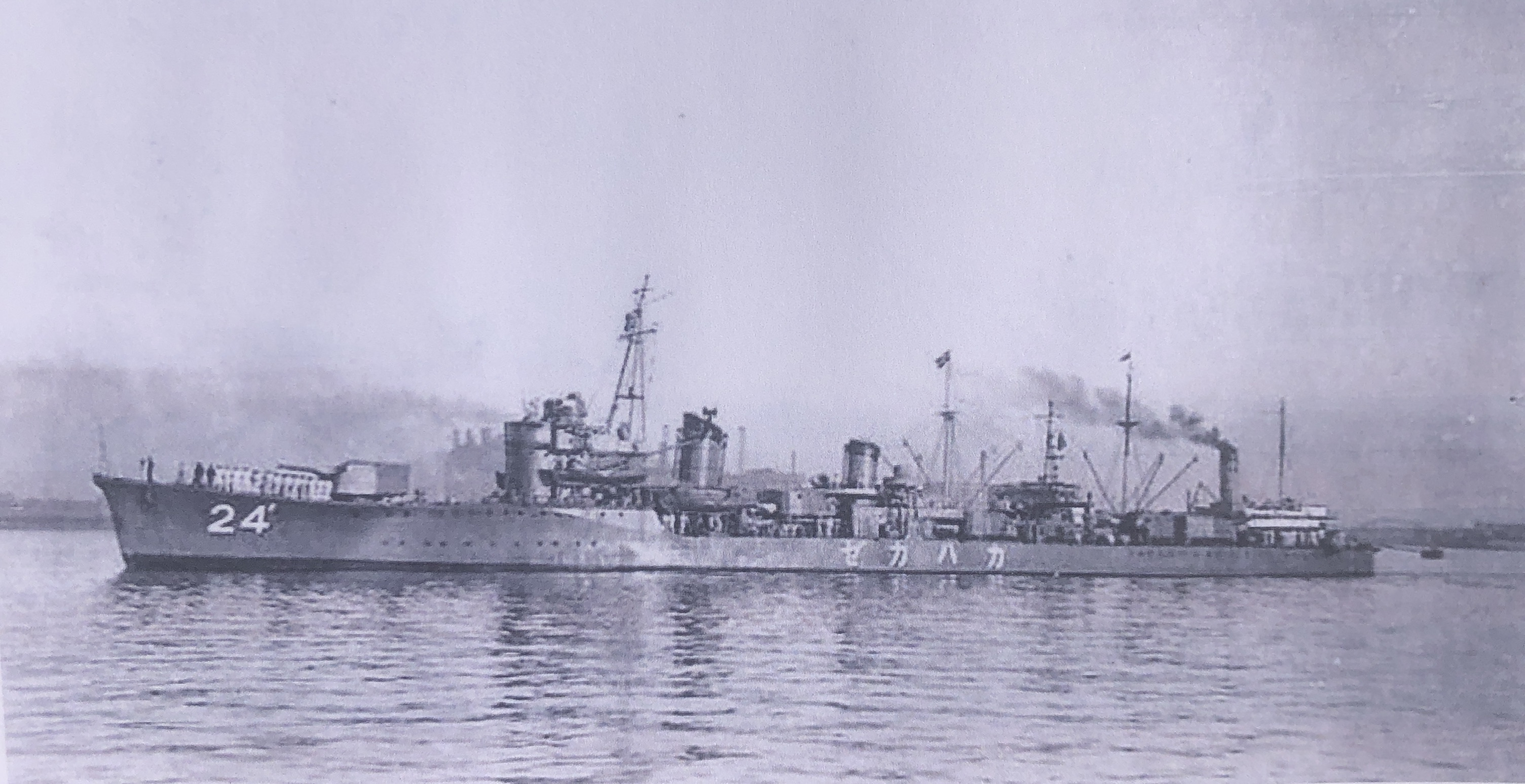
Kawakaze

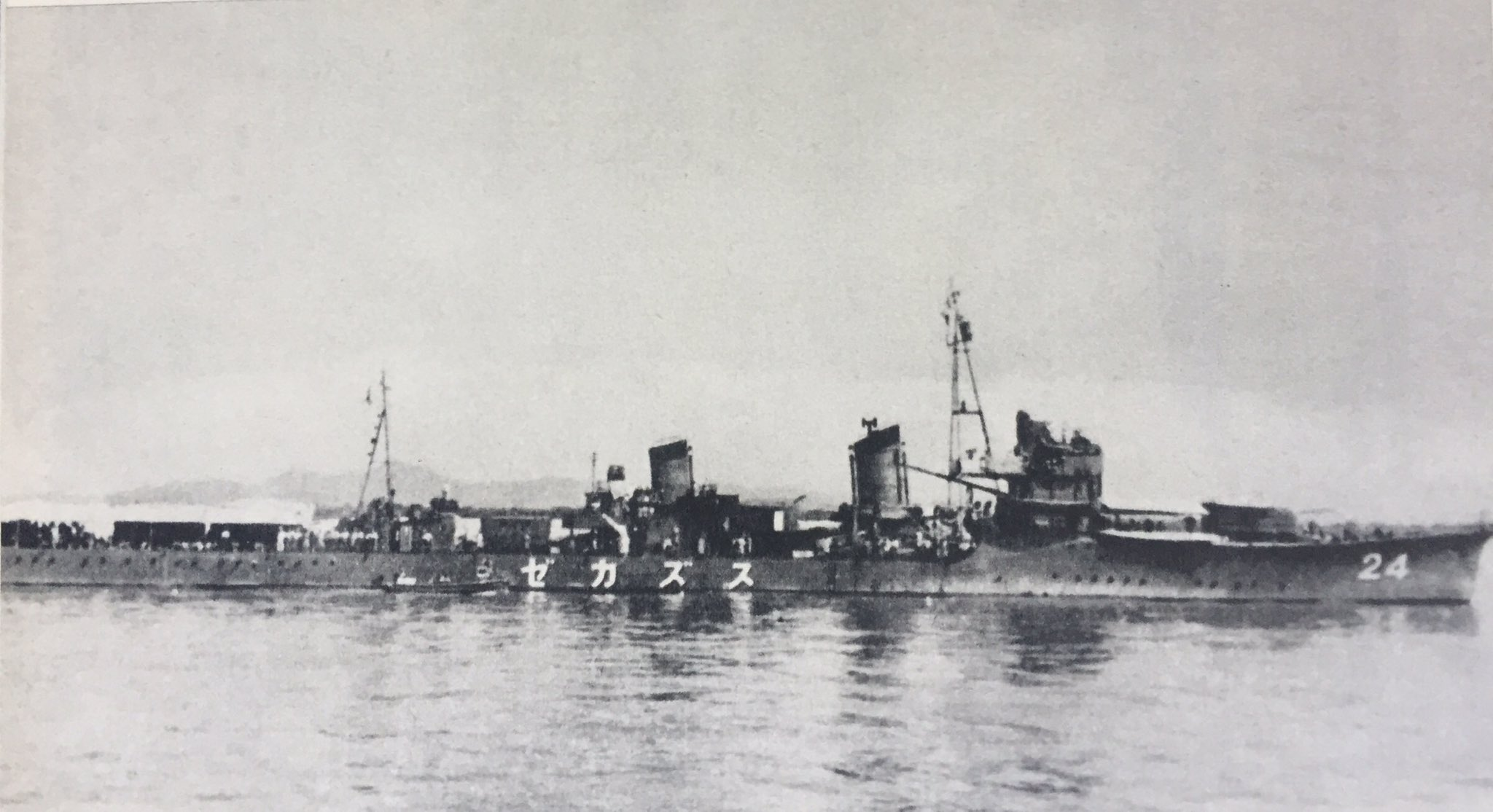
Suzukaze

== Notes ==
=== Books ===
- Evans, David (1979). Kaigun: Strategy, Tactics, and Technology in the Imperial Japanese Navy, 1887-1941. US Naval Institute Press. ISBN 0-87021-192-7.
- Brown, David (1990). Warship Losses of World War Two. Naval Institute Press. ISBN 1-55750-914-X.
- Roger Chesneau, ed. (1980). Conway's All the World's Fighting Ships 1922-1946. Grenwitch: Conway Maritime Press. ISBN 0-85177-146-7.
- Howarth, Stephen (1983). The Fighting Ships of the Rising Sun: The Drama of the Imperial Japanese Navy, 1895–1945. Atheneum. ISBN 0-689-11402-8.
- Jentsura, Hansgeorg (1976). Warships of the Imperial Japanese Navy, 1869–1945. US Naval Institute Press. ISBN 0-87021-893-X.
- Lengerer, Hans (2007). The Japanese Destroyers of the Hatsuharu Class. Warship 2007. London: Conway. pp. 91–110. ISBN 978-1-84486-041-8.OCLC 77257764
- Stille, Mark E. (2013). Imperial Japanese Navy Destroyers 1919-45 (1) - Minekaze to Shiratsuyu Classes. Osprey Publishing (No. 198). ISBN 978-1-84908-984-5.
- Watts, Anthony J. (1971). The Imperial Japanese Navy. Macdonald & Co. ISBN 978-0385012683.
- Watts, Anthony J. (1966). Japanese Warships of World War 2. Ian Allan Ltd.
- Whitley, Michael J. (1988). Destroyers of World War 2. Cassell Publishing. ISBN 1-85409-521-8.
- Domagalski, John J. (2012). Sunk in Kula Gulf: The Final Voyage of the USS Helena and the Incredible Story of Her Survivors in World War II. Potomac Books Inc. ISBN 978-1-59797-839-2.
- Hara, Capt. Tameichi (1961). Japanese Destroyer Captain. New York: Ballantine Books. ISBN 0-345-02522-9.
