= Charles French =

Charles French may refer to:

- C. G. W. French (Charles Grafton Wilberton French, 1822–1891), American jurist and judge
- Charles French (entomologist) (1842–1933), Australian horticulturalist and naturalist
- Charles French (politician) (1851–1925), Irish politician
- Charles K. French (1860–1952), American film actor
- Charles M. French (1876–1972), American athlete
- Charlie French (1883–1962), U.S. baseball player
- Charles Daniel French (1884–1954), Canadian politician and Member of the Legislative Assembly of Quebec
- Charles Jackson French (1919–1956), American sailor
  - USS Charles J. French
