= USS Charles J. French =

Guided missile destroyer

History

United States
- Name: Charles J. French
- Namesake: Charles Jackson French
- Builder: Ingalls Shipbuilding
- Identification: Hull number: DDG-142
- Status: Authorized for construction

General characteristics
- Class & type: Arleigh Burke-class destroyer
- Displacement: 9,217 tons (full load)
- Length: 510 ft (160 m)
- Beam: 66 ft (20 m)
- Propulsion: 4 × General Electric LM2500 gas turbines 100,000 shp (75,000 kW)
- Speed: 31 knots (57 km/h; 36 mph)
- Complement: 380 officers and enlisted
- Armament: Guns: 1 × 5-inch (127 mm)/62 Mk 45 Mod 4 (lightweight gun); 1 × 20 mm (0.8 in) Phalanx CIWS; 2 × 25 mm (0.98 in) Mk 38 machine gun system; 4 × 0.50 in (12.7 mm) caliber guns; Missiles: 1 × 32-cell, 1 × 64-cell (96 total cells) Mk 41 vertical launching system (VLS): RIM-66M surface-to-air missile; RIM-156 surface-to-air missile; RIM-174A Standard ERAM; RIM-161 anti-ballistic missile; RIM-162 ESSM (quad-packed); BGM-109 Tomahawk cruise missile; RUM-139 vertical launch ASROC; Torpedoes: 2 × Mark 32 triple torpedo tubes: Mark 46 lightweight torpedo; Mark 50 lightweight torpedo; Mark 54 lightweight torpedo
- Armor: Kevlar-type armor with steel hull. Numerous passive survivability measures.
- Aircraft carried: 2 × MH-60R Seahawk helicopters
- Aviation facilities: Double hangar and helipad

USS Charles J. French (DDG-142) is the planned 92nd Arleigh Burke-class (Flight III) Aegis guided missile destroyer of the United States Navy. She is named for Charles J. French.

== Naming ==
She is named for Steward's Mate 1st Class Charles J. French, an African American cook serving in the US Navy during World War II who was posthumously awarded the Navy and Marine Corps Medal for heroic actions not involving direct contact with an armed enemy. US Navy Secretary Carlos Del Toro announced the name on 10 January 2024 in honor of a sailor whose heroics had long been over-looked.

=== Historical background ===
French was serving in the Pacific aboard the destroyer USS Gregory when his ship was sunk at Guadalcanal on 4 September 1942. As the crew were abandoning ship, the Japanese began shelling helpless men in the water. French collected a group of wounded shipmates onto a makeshift raft which was attached to his waist with a rope. He then spent the next eight hours swimming through the shark-infested waters towing the raft carrying approximately fifteen shipmates to safety. Despite saving these lives, and the multiple recommendations to decorate French with a higher level medal or award for his valor, such as the Navy Cross, all were rejected by the military. Instead he only received a personal letter of commendation from Admiral William Halsey.
