= Barbara O. Barnwell =

Staff Sergeant Barbara O. Barnwell, USMCR (c. 1928 – c. 1977) was the first female Marine to be awarded the Navy and Marine Corps Medal, which she was awarded on August 7, 1953, for saving a fellow Marine from drowning.

== Quote ==
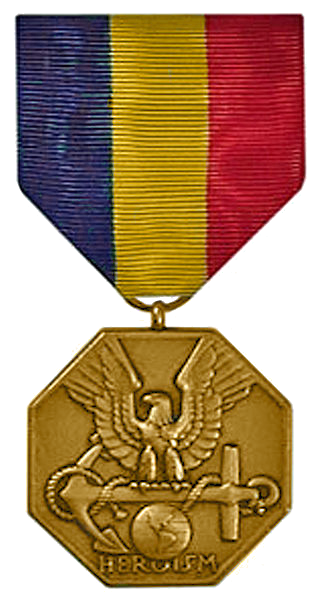

The President of the United States of America takes pleasure in presenting the Navy and Marine Corps Medal to Staff Sergeant Barbara O. Barnwell (MCSN: W-700005), United States Marine Corps, for heroism involving voluntary risk of life not involving conflict with an armed enemy, on June 7, 1952, at Camp Lejeune, North Carolina. Sergeant Barnwell, while swimming 100 to 150 yards offshore, heard cries for help from a male enlisted Marine who was struggling in the heavy surf fifty feet from her. Without a thought for her own safety, Sergeant Barnwell quickly swam to the near-hysterical man and managed to secure a hold on him despite the fact that he fought and scratched her and pulled her underwater several times. Although both their lives were endangered by the man's struggling and the severe undertow, Sergeant Barnwell courageously swam with the man in tow to shallow water where she was met by a lifeguard. Between the two of them the man was brought to the beach where artificial respiration was administered to the unconscious man. Sergeant Barnwell modestly left the scene without learning the identity of the man she had rescued. Her heroic conduct in the face of great danger to herself was outstanding, and was in keeping with the highest traditions of the United States Naval Service.

— Barbara Barnwell's Navy and Marine Corps Medal citation

== See also ==
- List of women's firsts
