= Charles Jackson French =

United States Navy sailor (1919–1956)

- Born: September 25, 1919; Foreman, Arkansas, US
- Died: November 7, 1956 (aged 37); San Diego, California, US
- Military career
- Allegiance: United States
- Branch: United States Navy
- Service years: 1937–1946
- Rank: Steward's mate first class
- Awards: Navy and Marine Corps Medal

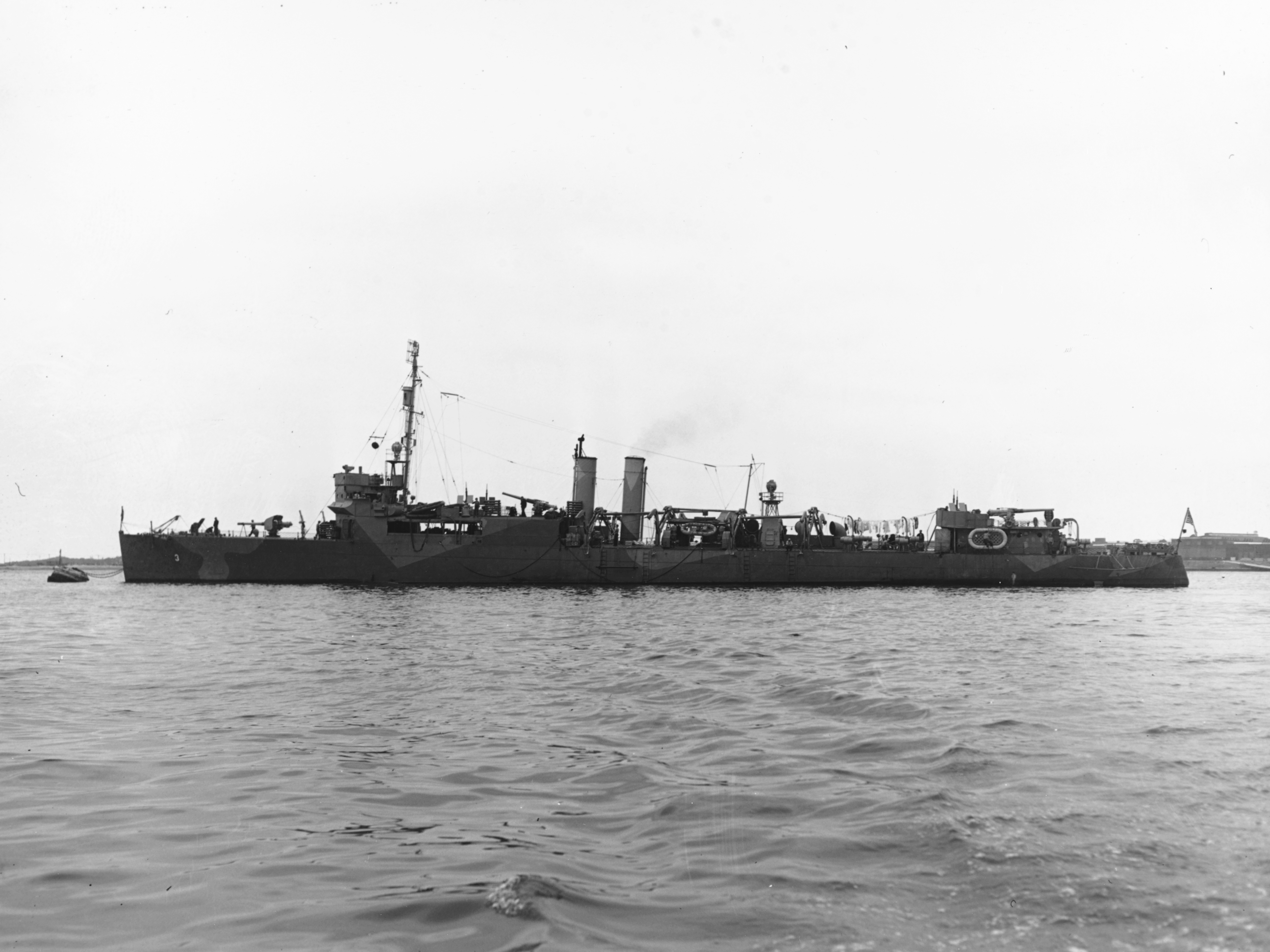
USS Gregory in early 1942

Charles Jackson French (September 25, 1919 – November 7, 1956) was a United States Navy sailor known for his heroic actions in the Pacific Theater of World War II, where he saved 15 of his shipmates after their high-speed transport was sunk in combat. He was posthumously awarded the Navy and Marine Corps Medal. The future Arleigh Burke-class guided-missile destroyer (DDG 142) is named the USS Charles J. French in his honor.

== Biography ==
French was an orphan from Foreman, Arkansas who learned to swim in the Red River at the age of eight.

First enlisting in the Navy in 1937, he completed his enlistment in 1941 as a Mess Attendant 3rd Class and moved to Omaha, Nebraska where he lived with his older sister. With the attack on Pearl Harbor, French went to the closest recruitment office, and on December 19, 1941, re-enlisted in the Navy.

After French's ship, the High-speed transport USS Gregory (APD-3), was sunk by gunfire from Imperial Japanese Navy ships in the Solomon Islands on the morning of September 5, 1942, the Mess Attendant 2nd Class swam six to eight hours in shark-infested waters near Guadalcanal while towing a life raft with 15 survivors aboard out of the range of Japanese gunfire and possible capture, which likely would have meant execution. Swimming until sunrise, French and the 15 sailors on the raft he was towing were spotted by a scout aircraft. The pilot dispatched a Marine landing craft to pick them up. French was one of six sailors who swam through the night and up to eight hours, rescuing all but 11 members of Gregory’s crew.

French was recommended for the Navy Cross, but instead received only a letter of commendation from Admiral William F. Halsey Jr. in May 1943. Admiral Halsey was then commander of the Southern Pacific Fleet. The commendation stated:

For meritorious conduct in action while serving on board of a destroyer transport which was badly damaged during the engagement with Japanese forces in the British Solomon Islands on September 5, 1942. After the engagement, a group of about 15 men was adrift on a raft, which was being deliberately shelled by Japanese naval forces. French tied a line to himself and swam for more than two hours without rest, thus attempting to tow the raft. His conduct was in keeping with the highest traditions of the Naval Service.

French was memorialized on War Gum trading cards and in a comic strip. The Chicago Defender named him Hero of the Year.

French was discharged as a Steward's Mate First Class on March 9, 1945. After the war, he married and had one daughter. Suffering from alcoholism likely caused by post-traumatic stress disorder, French died on November 11, 1956, at the age of 37, and was buried at Fort Rosecrans National Cemetery in San Diego, California.

In 2022, French was posthumously awarded the Navy and Marine Corps Medal for heroic actions not involving direct contact with an armed enemy. The award was presented on May 21, 2022, at Naval Base San Diego, at a ceremony in which the base's rescue swimmer training pool was dedicated in French's honor.

In June 2022, President Joe Biden signed into law H.R. 4168, to designate the United States Postal Service facility located at 6223 Maple Street, in Omaha, Nebraska, as the Petty Officer 1st Class Charles Jackson French Post Office. On January 10, 2024, the U.S. Secretary of the Navy, Carlos Del Toro, announced that a new Arleigh Burke-class guided-missile destroyer (DDG 142) would be named the USS Charles J. French in his honor.
