= Navy and Marine Corps Medal =

U.S. non-combat decoration

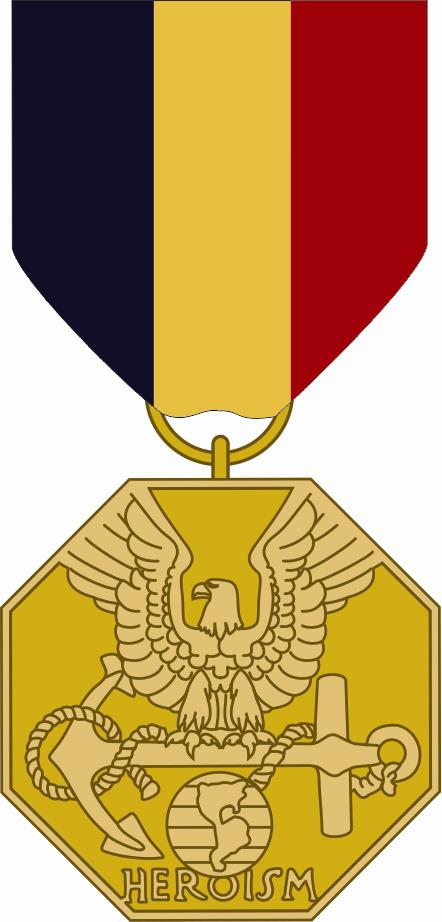
- Type: Military medal
- Awarded for: "Distinguishing oneself by heroism not involving actual conflict with an enemy of the United States"
- Presented by: the United States Department of the Navy
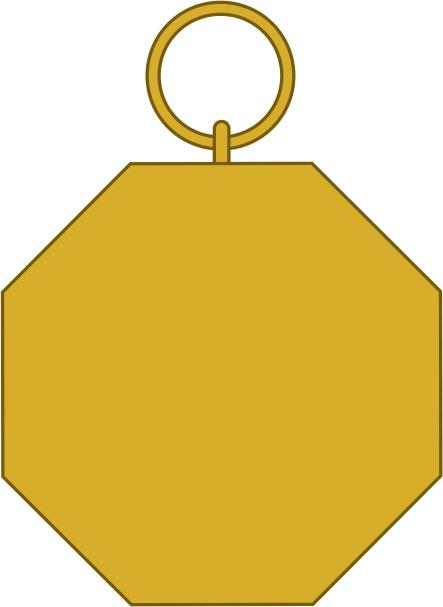
- Reverse
- Established: 7 August 1942; Retroactive to 6 December 1941
- First award: World War II
- Service ribbon

Precedence
- Next (higher): Distinguished Flying Cross
- Equivalent: Army: Soldier's Medal; Air and Space Forces: Airman's Medal; Coast Guard: Coast Guard Medal
- Next (lower): Bronze Star Medal

The Navy and Marine Corps Medal is the highest non-combat decoration awarded for heroism by the United States Department of the Navy to members of the United States Navy and United States Marine Corps. The medal was established by an act of Congress on 7 August 1942, and is authorized under 10 U.S.C. § 6246.

The Navy and Marine Corps Medal is the equivalent of the Army's Soldier's Medal, the Air and Space Forces' Airman's Medal, and the Coast Guard Medal.

== Criteria ==
As the senior non-combat award for heroism, this award hinges on the actual level of personal "life threatening" risk experienced by the awardee. For heroic performance to rise to this level it must be clearly established that the act involved very specific life-threatening risk to the awardee.

During the mid-20th century, the Navy and Marine Corps Medal has been awarded instead of the Silver or Gold Lifesaving Medal for sea rescues involving risk to life. This is due primarily to the creation of a variety of additional military decorations that are often considered more prestigious than the Lifesaving Medal.

Additional awards of the medal are denoted by gold or silver 5/16 inch stars.

The Navy and Marine Corps Medal was first bestowed during World War II. However, the medal was awarded retroactively for actions that predated its establishment, "to any person to whom the Secretary of the Navy, before August 7, 1942, awarded a letter of commendation for heroism, and who applies for that medal, regardless of the date of the act of heroism."

== Appearance ==
The Navy and Marine Corps Medal is an octagonal bronze medal. The obverse depicts an eagle holding a fouled anchor over a globe. The word Heroism is inscribed below the globe. The ribbon of the medal is three equal stripes of navy blue, old gold, and apple red.

== Notable recipients ==
- Barbara O. Barnwell - First female Marine awarded the medal, which she was awarded on August 7, 1953, for saving a fellow Marine from drowning.
- Carl Brashear, USN, Navy Master Diver
- Charles Walter David Jr., USCG, rescued sailors from the freezing Atlantic after the USAT Dorchester was sunk by a U-boat in 1943.
- Charles Jackson French, USN, Mess Attendant 2nd Class
- John F. Kennedy, USN – President of the United States who was awarded the medal as commanding officer of Motor Torpedo Boat PT-109 during World War II.
- Don Shipley, USN, Former Navy SEAL and Stolen valor activist
- Britt K. Slabinski, USN, Medal of Honor recipient, Navy SEAL
- James E. Williams, USN, Medal of Honor recipient, Vietnam War

== See also ==
- Awards and decorations of the United States military
