= USS Gregory (DD-82) =

Wickes-class destroyer

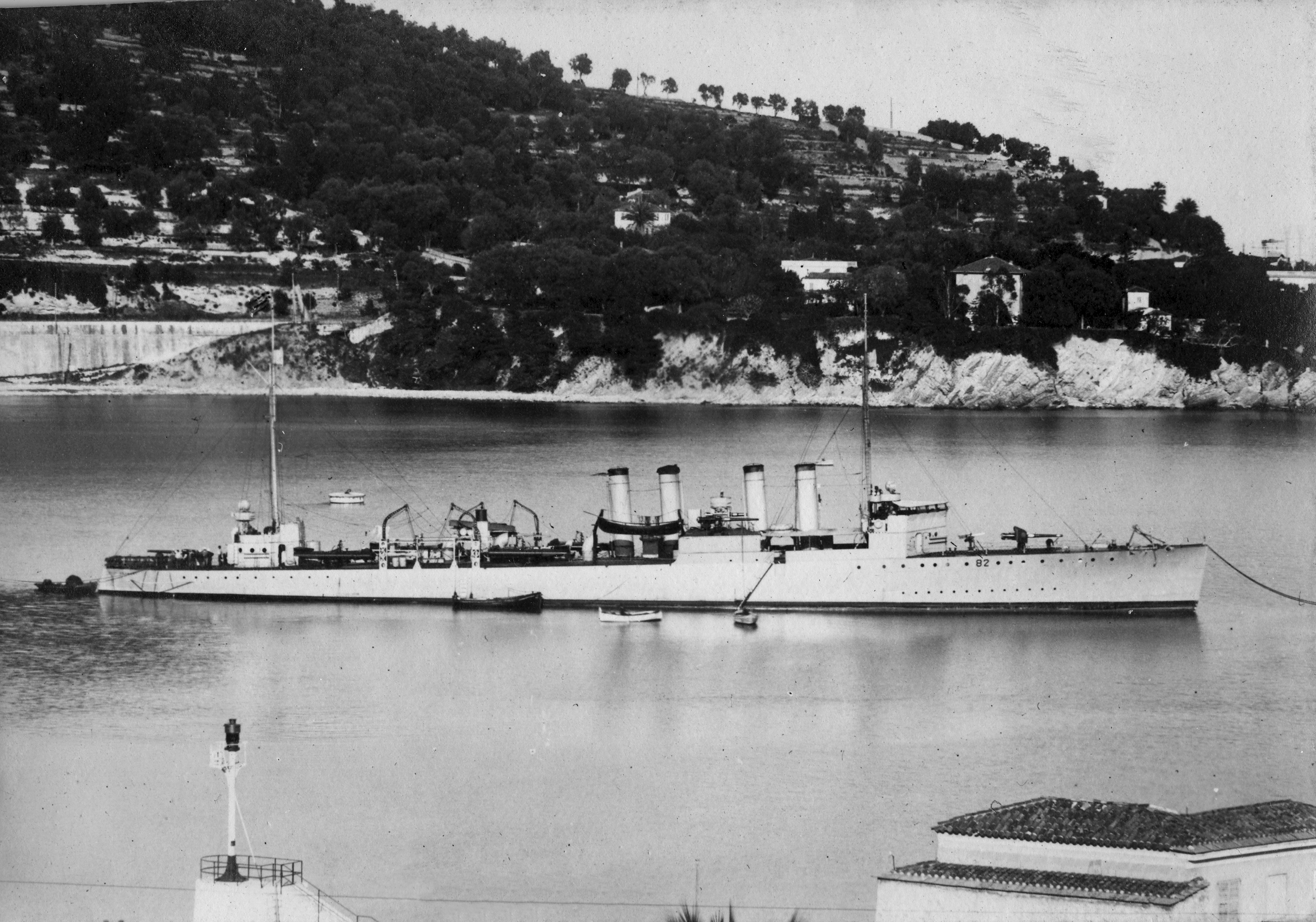
- USS Gregory (DD-82), circa in 1919

History

United States
- Name: USS Gregory
- Builder: Fore River Shipyard, Quincy, Massachusetts
- Laid down: 25 August 1917
- Launched: 27 January 1918
- Commissioned: 1 June 1918
- Decommissioned: 7 July 1922
- Reclassified: High-speed transport, APD-3, 2 August 1940
- Recommissioned: 4 November 1940
- Stricken: 2 October 1942
- Fate: Sunk 5 September 1942

General characteristics
- Class & type: Wickes-class destroyer
- Displacement: 1,191 tons
- Length: 314 ft 4 in (95.81 m)
- Beam: 30 ft 11 in (9.42 m)
- Draft: 9 ft 2 in (2.79 m)
- Speed: 35 knots (65 km/h; 40 mph)
- Complement: 141 officers and enlisted
- Armament: 4 × 4"/50 (102 mm) guns, 1 3"/25 (76 mm), 4 × 3 × 21 inch (533 mm) torpedo tubes

USS Gregory (DD-82/APD-3) was a Wickes-class destroyer in the United States Navy during World War I and as APD-3 World War II. She was named for Admiral Francis Gregory USN (1780–1866). She was converted into a high-speed transport during World War II and was sunk by Japanese warships.

== Construction and commissioning ==
Gregory was laid down by the Fore River Shipbuilding Company at Quincy, Massachusetts, on 25 August 1917, launched on 27 January 1918 by Mrs. George S. Trevor, great-granddaughter of Admiral Gregory, and commissioned on 1 June 1918, Commander Arthur P. Fairfield in command.

== Service history ==
=== World War I ===
Joining a convoy at New York City, Gregory sailed for Brest, France, on 25 June 1918. She spent the final summer of the war escorting convoys from the French port to various Allied ports in Britain and France. As the war neared its close, Gregory was assigned to the patrol squadron at Gibraltar 2 November 1918. In addition to patrolling in the Atlantic and Mediterranean, Gregory carried passengers and supplies to the Adriatic and aided in the execution of the terms of the Austrian armistice. After six months of this duty, the flush-deck destroyer joined naval forces taking part in relief missions to the western Mediterranean 28 April 1919. In company with the battleship Arizona, Gregory carried supplies and passengers to Smyrna, Constantinople, and Batum. She then sailed for Gibraltar with the American consul from Tiflis, Russia, and some British army officers. She offloaded her passengers on the rocky fortress; Gregory sailed for New York City, reaching the United States on 13 June 1919.

=== Inter-War period ===
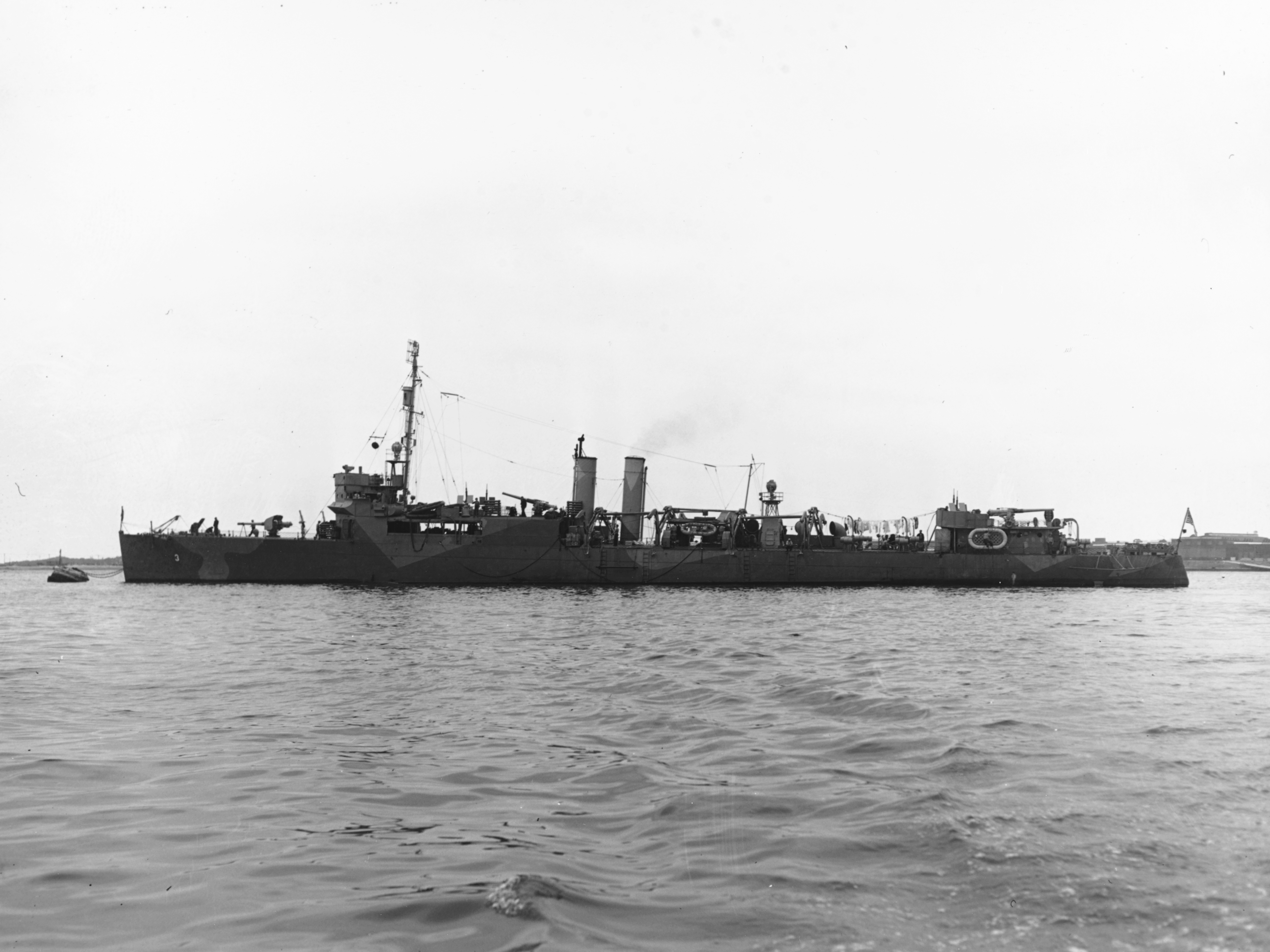
Gregory after conversion to a high-speed transport

After brief tours in reserve at Tompkinsville, New York, the Brooklyn Navy Yard, and the Philadelphia Navy Yard, Gregory sailed to Charleston, South Carolina, on 4 January 1921. A year of local training operations out of the southern port ended on 12 April 1922, when Gregory entered the Philadelphia Navy Yard. She decommissioned 7 July 1922 and went into reserve.

As war broke again over Europe, threatening to involve the United States, Gregory and three other four-stackers were taken out of mothballs for conversion to high-speed transports. The destroyers were stripped of virtually all their armament to make room for boats, while other important modifications were made for troops and cargo (such as removing two forward boiler rooms and their stacks). Gregory was recommissioned on 4 November 1940 as APD-3 and joined Little, Colhoun, and McKean to form Transport Division 12 (TransDiv 12). Gregory and her sister APDs trained along the East Coast for the following year, perfecting landing techniques with various Marine divisions. None of these ships survived through the Pacific war, as all but McKean were lost during the Solomon Islands campaign.

=== World War II ===
On 27 January 1942, she departed Charleston for Pearl Harbor. Exercises in Hawaiian waters kept TransDiv 12 in the Pacific through the spring, after which they returned to San Diego for repairs. They sailed for the Pacific again on 7 June, reaching Pearl Harbor a week later to train for the upcoming invasion of Guadalcanal, America's first offensive effort in the Pacific campaign.

Departing Nouméa on 31 July 1942, Gregory joined Task Force 62 (under Admiral Frank Jack Fletcher) and steamed for Guadalcanal. After sending her Marines ashore in the first assault waves 7 August, Gregory and her sister APDs remained in the area. The ships patrolled the waters around the hotly contested islands, waters which were to gain notoriety as "Iron Bottom Sound", and brought up ammunition and supplies from Espiritu Santo.

On 4 September, Gregory and Little were returning to their anchorage at Tulagi after transferring a Marine Raider Battalion to Savo Island. The night was inky-black with a low haze obscuring all landmarks, and the captains decided to remain on patrol rather than risk threading their way through the dangerous channel. As they steamed between Guadalcanal and Savo Island at 10 knots (19 km/h; 12 mph), Yūdachi, Hatsuyuki and Murakumo entered the Slot undetected to deliver a "Tokyo Express" package of troops and supplies to Guadalcanal. After completing the delivery, the crews prepared to bombard Henderson Field at Lunga Point. At 00:56 on 5 September, Gregory and Little saw flashes of gunfire, which they assumed came from a Japanese submarine until radar showed four targets; apparently, a cruiser had joined the three destroyers. While the two outgunned ships were debating whether to close for action or depart quietly and undetected, the decision was taken out of their hands.

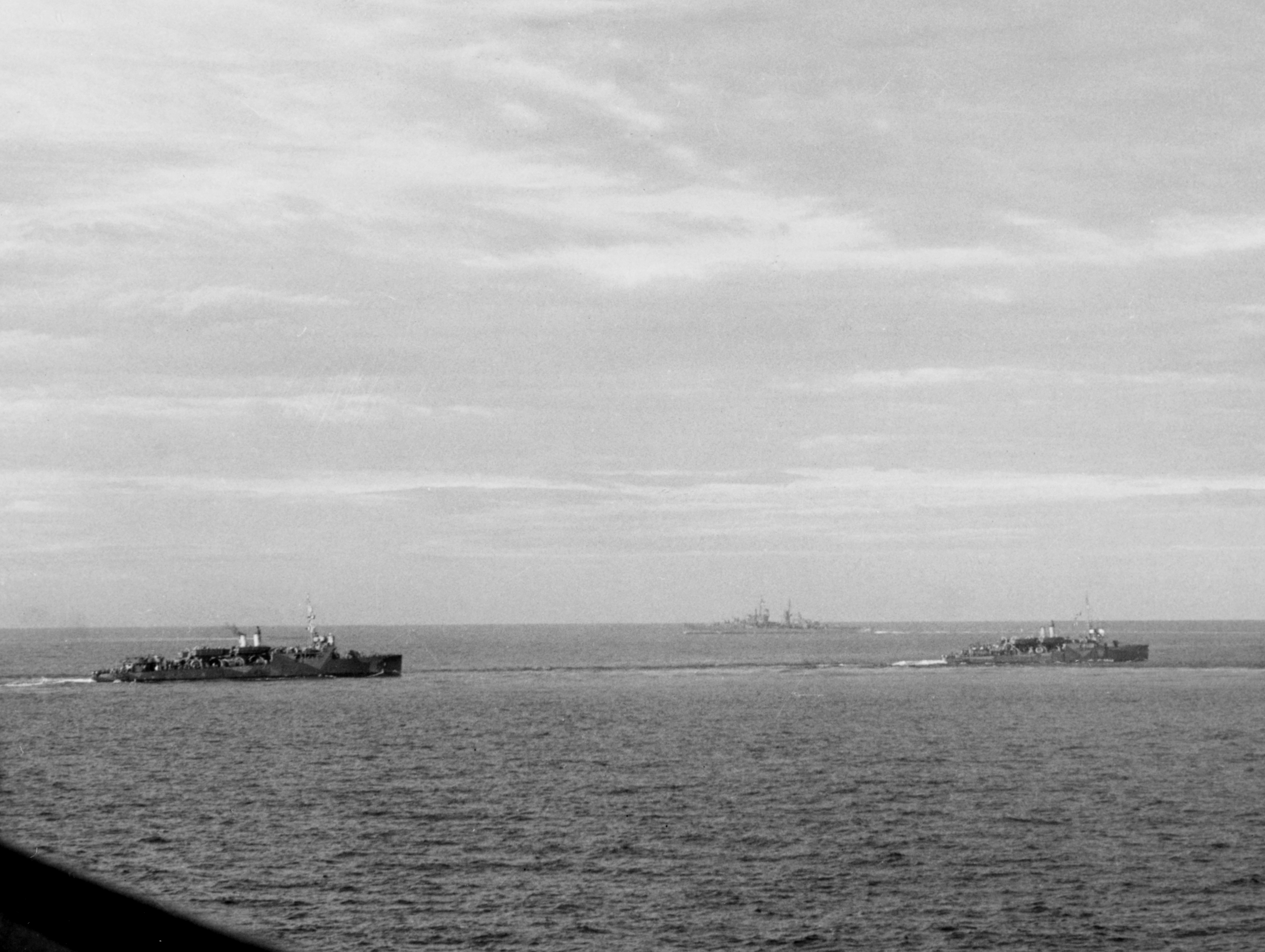
Gregory and USS Little on 30 July 1942.

A Navy pilot had also seen the gunfire, and assuming it came from a Japanese submarine, dropped a string of five flares almost on top of the two APDs. Gregory and Little, silhouetted against the blackness, were spotted immediately by the Japanese destroyers, which opened fire at 01:00. Gregory brought all her guns to bear, but was overmatched and less than 3 minutes after the flares had been dropped was dead in the water and beginning to sink. Two boilers had burst and her decks were a mass of flames. Her skipper, Lieutenant Commander Harry F. Bauer, himself seriously wounded, gave the word to abandon ship, and Gregory's crew took to the water. Bauer ordered two companions to aid another crewman yelling for help and was never seen again; for his conduct, he posthumously received the Silver Star. The U.S. Navy subsequently named a ship, Harry F. Bauer, in recognition of his gallant action.

At 01:23, with all of Gregory's and most of Little's crew in the water, the Japanese ships began shelling again—aiming not at the crippled ships, but at their helpless crews in the water. Gregory sank stern first some 40 minutes after the firing had begun, and was followed two hours later by Little. Fleet Admiral Chester Nimitz, in praising the courageous crews after their loss, wrote that "both of these small vessels fought as well as possible against the overwhelming odds ... With little means, they performed duties vital to the success of the campaign." Twenty-four officers and men, including the commanding officer, from Gregory were killed.

Petty Officer First Class Charles French swam 6–8 hours in shark-infested waters near Guadalcanal while towing a life raft with 15 of the Gregory's survivors to avoid capture and possible execution by Japanese forces on land.

Gregory's name was struck from the Navy List 2 October 1942.

== Awards ==
Gregory received two battle stars for her World War II service.
