= Japanese destroyer Murakumo (1928) =

Fubuki-class destroyer

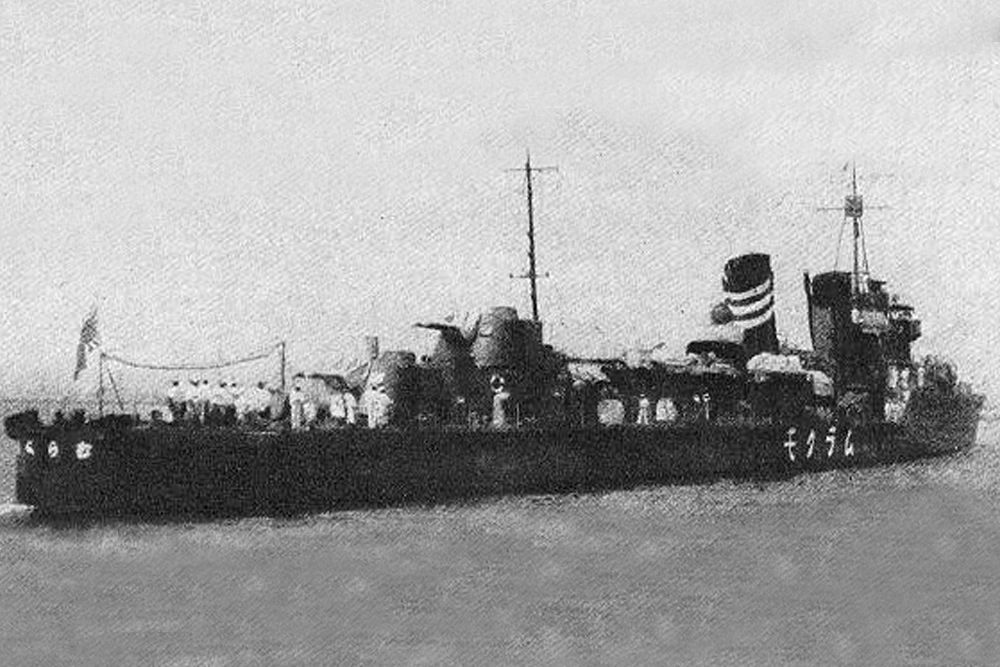
- Murakumo

History

Empire of Japan
- Name: Murakumo
- Namesake: Japanese destroyer Murakumo (1898)
- Ordered: 1923 Fiscal Year
- Builder: Fujinagata Shipyards
- Yard number: Destroyer No.39
- Laid down: 25 April 1927
- Launched: 27 September 1928
- Commissioned: 10 May 1929
- Stricken: 15 November 1942
- Fate: Sunk in action, 12 October 1942

General characteristics
- Class & type: Fubuki-class destroyer
- Displacement: 1,750 long tons (1,780 t) standard; 2,050 long tons (2,080 t) re-built
- Length: 111.96 m (367.3 ft) pp; 115.3 m (378 ft) waterline; 118.41 m (388.5 ft) overall
- Beam: 10.4 m (34 ft 1 in)
- Draft: 3.2 m (10 ft 6 in)
- Propulsion: 4 × Kampon type boilers; 2 × Kampon Type Ro geared turbines; 2 × shafts at 50,000 ihp (37,000 kW)
- Speed: 38 knots (44 mph; 70 km/h)
- Range: 5,000 nmi (9,300 km) at 14 knots (26 km/h)
- Complement: 219
- Armament: 6 × Type 3 127 mm 50 caliber naval guns (3×2); up to 22 × Type 96 25 mm AT/AA Guns; up to 10 × 13 mm AA guns; 9 × 610 mm (24 in) torpedo tubes; 36 × depth charges

Service record
- Operations: Second Sino-Japanese War; Invasion of French Indochina; Battle of Malaya; Battle of Sunda Strait; Indian Ocean raid; Battle of Midway; Solomon Islands campaign; Guadalcanal campaign; Battle of Cape Esperance

Murakumo (叢雲, ”Massed Clouds”) was the fifth of twenty-four Fubuki-class destroyers, built for the Imperial Japanese Navy following World War I.

== History ==
Construction of the advanced Fubuki-class destroyers was authorized as part of the Imperial Japanese Navy's expansion program from fiscal 1923, intended to give Japan a qualitative edge with the world's most modern ships. The Fubuki class had performance that was a quantum leap over previous destroyer designs, so much so that they were designated Special Type destroyers (特型, Tokugata). The large size, powerful engines, high speed, large radius of action and unprecedented armament gave these destroyers the firepower similar to many light cruisers in other navies. Murakumo, built at the Fujinagata Shipyards in Osaka was laid down on 25 April 1927, launched on 27 September 1928 and commissioned on 10 May 1929. Originally assigned hull designation “Destroyer No. 39”, she was completed as Murakumo.

== Operational history ==
On completion, Murakumo was assigned to Destroyer Division 12 under the IJN 2nd Fleet. During the Second Sino-Japanese War, Murakumo was assigned to patrols of the central China coast, and participated in the Invasion of French Indochina in 1940.

=== World War II ===
At the time of the attack on Pearl Harbor, Murakumo was assigned to Destroyer Division 12 of Desron 3 of the IJN 1st Fleet, and had deployed from Kure Naval District to the port of Samah on Hainan Island. From 4 December to 12 December, she covered Japanese landings at Kota Bharu in Malaya. From 16 December, Murakumo was assigned to cover Japanese landings during Operation B in British Borneo. During this operation, Murakumo engaged the Dutch submarine HNLMS K XVI with depth charges after the submarine had torpedoed the destroyer Sagiri. Although Murakumo claimed credit for sinking K XVI, credit was later awarded to the submarine I-66.

In February 1942, Murakumo was part of the escort for the heavy cruiser Chōkai during Operation L, the invasion of Banka-Palembang and Anambas Islands. Murakumo joined the Western Java invasion force, and was in the Battle of Sunda Strait on 1 March, assisting in the sinking of the Australian cruiser HMAS Perth, the American cruiser USS Houston and the Dutch destroyer HNLMS Evertsen. On 10 March, Murakumo was reassigned to Destroyer Division 20 of Desron3 of the IJN 1st Fleet, and subsequently was involved in Operation T (the invasion of northern Sumatra) on 12 March and Operation D, (the invasion of the Andaman Islands) on 23 March. From 13–22 April, Murakumo returned via Singapore and Camranh Bay to Kure Naval Arsenal for maintenance.

On 4–5 June 1942, Murakumo participated in the Battle of Midway as part of Admiral Isoroku Yamamoto’s main fleet.

In July 1942, Murakumo sailed from Amami-Oshima to Mako Guard District, Singapore, Sabang and Mergui for a projected second Indian Ocean raid. The operation was cancelled due to the Guadalcanal campaign, and Murakumo was ordered to Truk instead. From August onwards, Murakumo was used for "Tokyo Express" high-speed transport missions in the Solomon Islands. On one of this missions, on 4–5 September, Murakumo assisted in sinking the fast transports USS Gregory and USS Little.

On another mission on 11–12 October 1942, as Murakumo was attempting to assist the cruiser Furutaka in the aftermath of the Battle of Cape Esperance, she was attacked by Allied aircraft. Three near misses, a torpedo hit and then a bomb hit left the ship unmaneuverable and aflame, with 22 crewmen dead. The destroyer Shirayuki rescued survivors, including Murakumo's skipper, Lieutenant Commander Higashi, then scuttled Murakumo with a torpedo 90 nautical miles (170 km) west-northwest of Savo Island at position 08°40′S 159°20′E.

On 15 November 1942, Murakumo was removed from the navy list.
