= USS Little (DD-79) =

Wickes-class destroyer

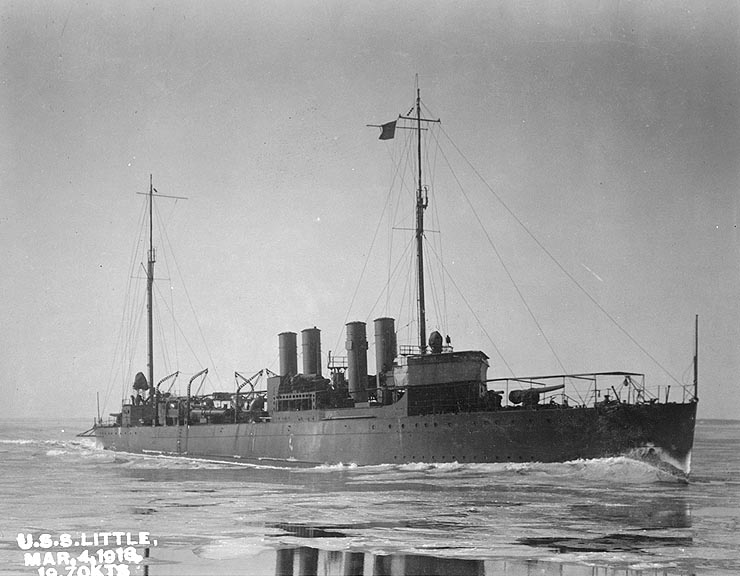
- USS Little (DD-79), running trials in icy waters, 4 March 1918.

History

United States
- Name: Little
- Namesake: George Little
- Builder: Fore River Shipyard, Quincy, Massachusetts
- Laid down: 18 June 1917
- Launched: 11 November 1917
- Commissioned: 6 April 1918
- Decommissioned: 5 July 1922
- Reclassified: Fast transport (APD-4) 2 August 1940
- Recommissioned: 4 November 1940
- Fate: Sunk 5 September 1942

General characteristics
- Class & type: Wickes-class destroyer
- Displacement: 1,191 tons
- Length: 314 ft 5 in (95.8 m)
- Beam: 30 ft 11 in (9.4 m)
- Draft: 9 ft 2 in (2.8 m)
- Speed: 35 knots (65 km/h; 40 mph)
- Complement: 133 officers and enlisted
- Armament: 4 × 4"/50 (102 mm) guns; 2 × 1-pounder guns; 4 × 3 21 in (533 mm) torpedo tubes

USS Little (DD-79/APD-4), a Wickes-class destroyer in the United States Navy during World War I and World War II. She was the first Navy ship named for George Little (1754–1809).

Little was laid down by Fore River Shipbuilding Corporation, Quincy, Massachusetts, 18 June 1917, launched 11 November 1917, sponsored by Mrs. Samuel W. Wakeman, and commissioned 6 April 1918, Commander Joseph K. Taussig in command.

== Service history ==
Little departed Norfolk, Virginia, on 5 May 1918 for convoy escort duty with Patrol Force, Coast of France, and operated from Brest until she sailed for home on 26 December. During this period she escorted President Woodrow Wilson's party to Europe to attend the Paris Peace Conference.

The ship arrived Boston, Massachusetts, on 18 January 1919 for drydock and operations with Destroyer Force, Atlantic. She escorted the president's party back into New York City from 6 to 8 July, and then engaged in tactical exercises, she was transferred to Reserve Status with ComDesRon 3 at Philadelphia, Pennsylvania, on 17 November, where she remained until 4 January 1921. The ship then operated along the Atlantic coast until she returned to Philadelphia and decommissioned 5 July 1922.

Converted to a high-speed transport by having two boilers removed and converted to troop quarters, Little was redesignated APD-4, 2 August 1940, and recommissioned 4 November 1940. She sailed for the Caribbean in February 1941 for maneuvers with the U.S. Atlantic Fleet, and then steamed to San Diego, California, where she arrived on 9 March for amphibious training. The ship returned to the east coast in late summer, and arrived at Norfolk on 1 December for drydocking.

As flagship for TransDiv 12, she departed for San Diego on 14 February 1942 for repairs and alterations. Upon completion of amphibious landing exercises in April, she steamed for Pearl Harbor. A short cruise to Midway Island in late June preceded her departure to New Caledonia on 7 July for the Solomons campaign.

Supplies for American troops on Guadalcanal had been badly disrupted by the Battle of Savo Island on 9 August 1942. High-speed destroyer-transports were called upon to remedy this shortage. As she discharged stores and Marine Raiders on the Guadalcanal beaches on 30 August, Little witnessed the destruction of Colhoun by enemy aircraft.

The three remaining APDs, Little, Gregory, and McKean, continued to support and help supply the Marines. On 4 September, Little and Gregory brought a detachment of Marine Raiders to Savo Island on an unfounded rumor that enemy forces had occupied it. The troops were returned to Lunga Point, Guadalcanal. That night was unusually dark, so Division Commander Hugh W. Hadley decided to patrol off Lunga Point rather than attempt to negotiate Tulagi Harbor with no visible landmarks.

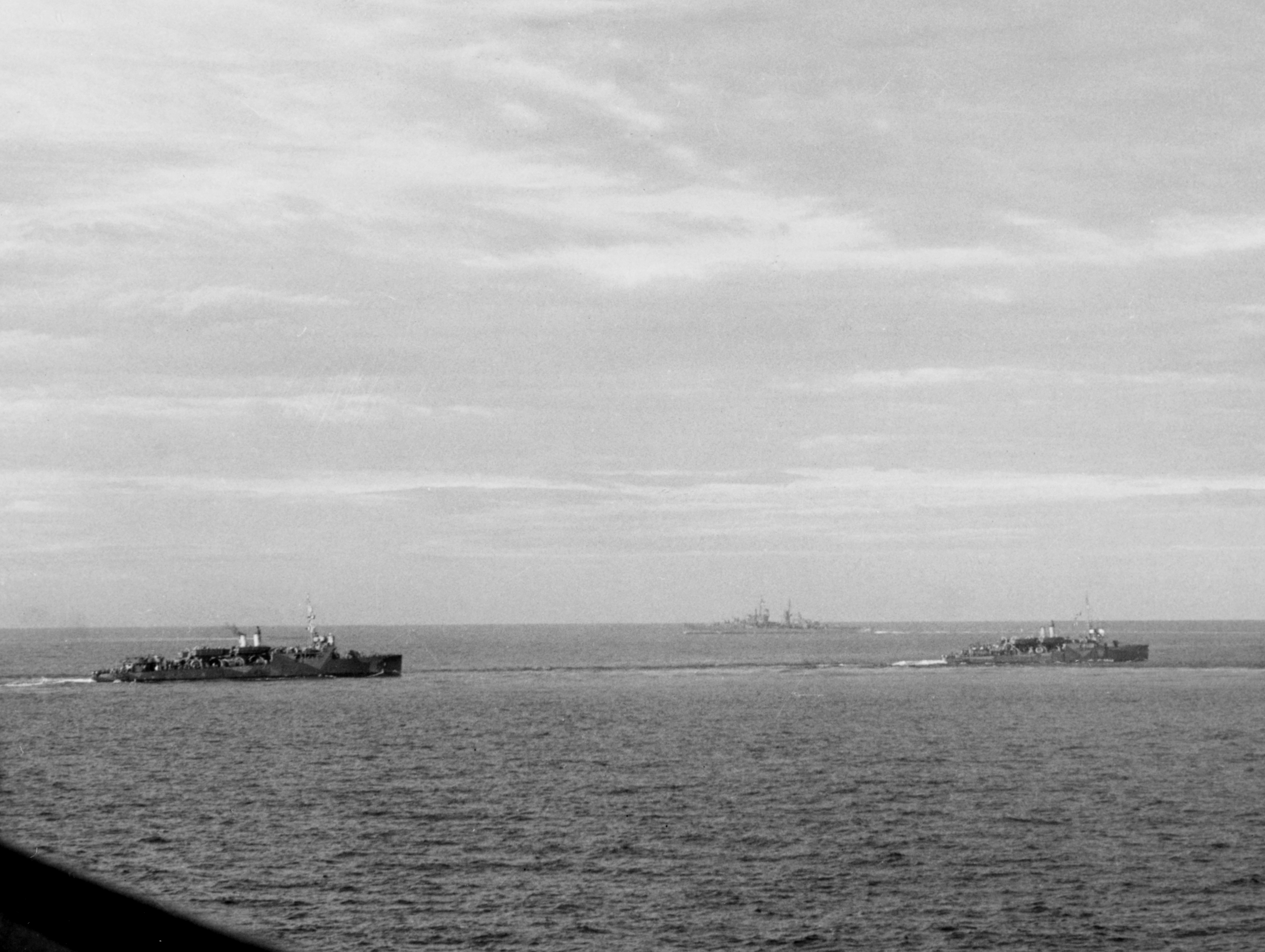
Little and Gregory on 30 July 1942.

About 0100 on 5 September, Little observed gun flashes to the east and believed this to be an enemy submarine. Moments later a Navy PBY Catalina flying over Savo Sound released a string of five flares to illuminate what he also thought was a submarine. The flares illuminated the APDs instead. A surprised Japanese surface destroyer force, engaged in shelling Henderson Field after delivering a "Tokyo Express" shipment of troops and supplies to Guadalcanal and the source of the flashes presumed to have come from a submarine, shifted their guns toward the APDs, and searchlights stabbed through the darkness. Though outgunned, Little opened fire on enemy destroyers, Yūdachi, Hatsuyuki and Murakumo, but took direct hits from salvos which left her helpless and ablaze by 0115. Gregory suffered the same fate. The Japanese, to assure their kill, steamed between the two stricken ships firing shells and strafing survivors. Gregory sank stern first about 0140. Little went down on an even keel about two hours later. Fleet Admiral Chester W. Nimitz paid sincere tribute to these gallant ships: "With little means, the ships performed duties vital to the success of the campaign." 65 officers and men from Little, including the commanding officer of Transport Division 12 and the commanding officer of Little were killed.

== Awards ==
Little received two battle stars for World War II service.
