= Japanese destroyer Hatsuyuki (1928) =

Fubuki-class destroyer

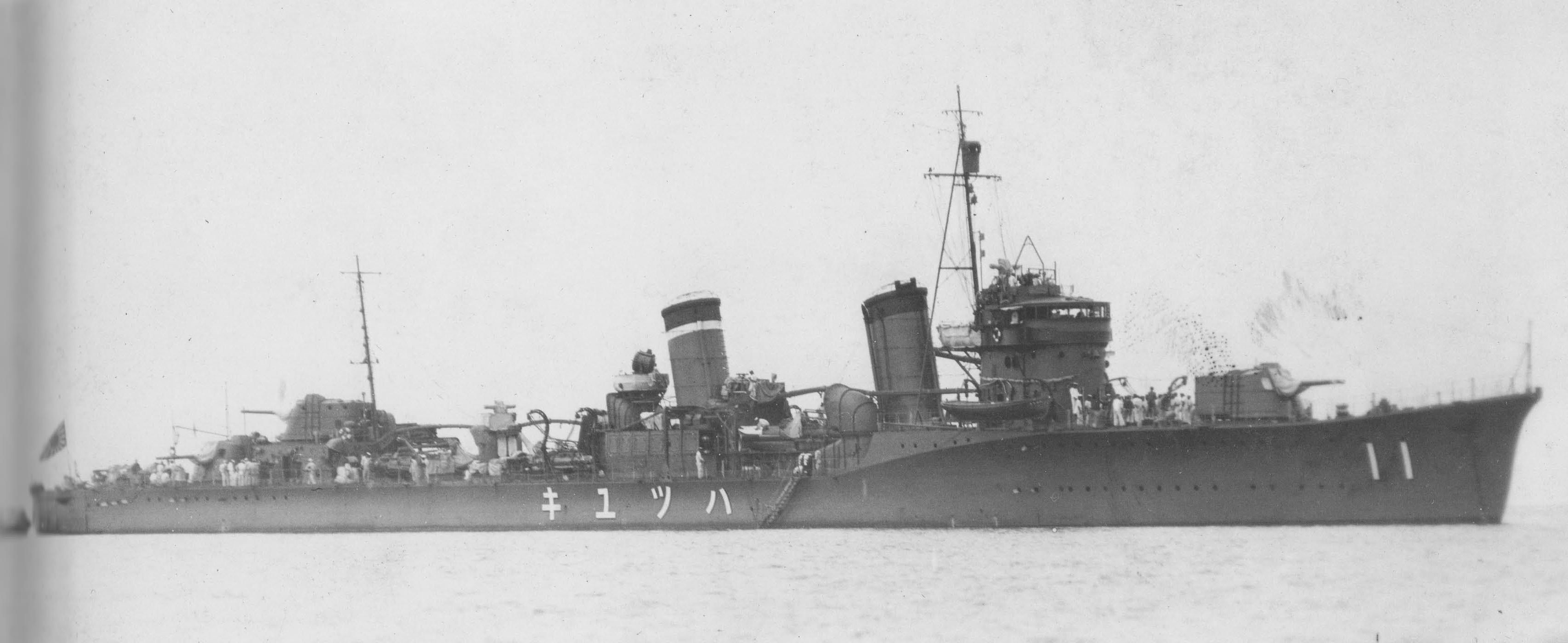
- Hatsuyuki

History

Empire of Japan
- Name: Hatsuyuki
- Ordered: 1923 Fiscal Year
- Builder: Maizuru Naval Arsenal
- Yard number: Destroyer No.37
- Laid down: 12 April 1927
- Launched: 29 September 1928
- Commissioned: 30 March 1929
- Stricken: 5 October 1943
- Fate: Sunk in air raid, 17 July 1943

General characteristics
- Class & type: Fubuki-class destroyer
- Displacement: 1,750 long tons (1,780 t) standard; 2,050 long tons (2,080 t) re-built
- Length: 111.96 m (367.3 ft) pp; 115.3 m (378 ft) waterline; 118.41 m (388.5 ft) overall
- Beam: 10.4 m (34 ft 1 in)
- Draft: 3.2 m (10 ft 6 in)
- Propulsion: 4 × Kampon type boilers; 2 × Kampon Type Ro geared turbines; 2 × shafts at 50,000 ihp (37,000 kW)
- Speed: 38 knots (44 mph; 70 km/h)
- Range: 5,000 nmi (9,300 km) at 14 knots (26 km/h)
- Complement: 219
- Armament: 6 × Type 3 127 mm 50 caliber naval guns (3×2); up to 22 × Type 96 25 mm AT/AA Guns; up to 10 × 13 mm AA guns; 9 × 610 mm (24 in) torpedo tubes; 36 × depth charges

Service record
- Operations: Second Sino-Japanese War; Invasion of French Indochina; Battle of Malaya; Battle of Sunda Strait; Indian Ocean raid; Battle of Midway; Solomon Islands campaign; Guadalcanal campaign; Battle of Cape Esperance; Naval Battle for Guadalcanal; Battle of Kula Gulf

Hatsuyuki (初雪, "First Snow") was the third of twenty-four Fubuki-class destroyers built for the Imperial Japanese Navy following World War I.

== History ==
Construction of the advanced Fubuki-class destroyers was authorized as part of the Imperial Japanese Navy's expansion program from fiscal 1923, intended to give Japan a qualitative edge with the world's most modern ships. The Fubuki class had performance that was a quantum leap over previous destroyer designs, so much so that they were designated Special Type destroyers (特型, Tokugata). The large size, powerful engines, high speed, large radius of action and unprecedented armament gave these destroyers the firepower similar to many light cruisers in other navies. Hatsuyuki, built at the Maizuru Naval Arsenal was laid down on 12 April 1926, launched on 29 September 1928 and commissioned on 30 March 1929. Originally assigned hull designation "Destroyer No. 37", she was completed as Hatsuyuki.

== Operational history ==
On completion, Hatsuyuki was assigned to Destroyer Division 11 under the IJN 2nd Fleet. In 1935, the destroyer was damaged in a typhoon as part of the Fourth Fleet incident. During the Second Sino-Japanese War, Hatsuyuki helped cover landings of Japanese forces during the Battle of Shanghai in 1937, and subsequent landings of Japanese forces at Hangzhou in northern China. In 1940, she also participated in the Invasion of French Indochina.

=== World War II history ===
At the time of the attack on Pearl Harbor, Hatsuyuki was assigned to Destroyer Division 11 of Desron 3 of the IJN 1st Fleet, and had deployed from Kure Naval District to the port of Samah on Hainan Island. From 4 December 1941 to 30 January 1942 Hatsuyuki was part of the escort for the heavy cruisers Suzuya, Kumano, Mogami and Mikuma out of Samah and Camranh Bay, French Indochina in support of Malaya, Banka-Palembang and Anambas Islands invasion operations. On 18 February, she was credited with sinking or capturing two transports attempting to flee from Singapore.

On 27 February, Hatsuyuki was assigned to "Operation J", covering landings of Japanese forces in western Java in the Netherlands East Indies, and was in the Battle of Sunda Strait on 1 March, assisting in the sinking of the Australian cruiser HMAS Perth and the American cruiser USS Houston.

Hatsuyuki was part of the escort for Admiral Jizaburo Ozawa's cover force for "Operation T" (the invasion of northern Sumatra) on 12 March and the "Operation D", (the invasion of the Andaman Islands) on 23 March. She subsequently served patrol and escort duties out of Port Blair during the Japanese raids into the Indian Ocean. On 13–22 April she returned to Kure Naval Arsenal for maintenance.

On 4–5 June 1942, Hatsuyuki participated in the Battle of Midway as part of Admiral Isoroku Yamamoto's main fleet.

In July 1942, Hatsuyuki sailed from Amami-Ōshima to Mako Guard District, Singapore, Sabang and Mergui for a projected second Indian Ocean raid. The operation was cancelled due to the Guadalcanal campaign, and she was ordered to Truk instead. From August onward, she was used for "Tokyo Express" high speed transport missions in the Solomon Islands. On one of this missions, on 4–5 September, Hatsuyuki assisted in sinking the high-speed transports USS Gregory and USS Little.

During the Battle of Cape Esperance on 11–12 October, Hatsuyuki took 518 survivors off of the sinking cruiser Furutaka, and two days later escorted the badly damaged Aoba to Truk. During the Battle of Santa Cruz on 26 October, she was on alert station at Shortland Island.

After helping evacuate surviving Japanese forces from Guadalcanal in early November, from 12 to 15 November, Hatsuyuki took part in the Naval Battle of Guadalcanal. Initially she escorted the Support Force commanded by Admiral Takeo Kurita, then joined the Emergency Bombardment Force of Admiral Nobutake Kondō. With the cruiser Nagara in the assault on enemy destroyers, Hatsuyuki assisted in sinking USS Benham, USS Walke, and USS Preston and damaging USS Gwin. Hatsuyuki then returned to Truk on 18 November. After making one more transport run to Rabaul in December, Hatsuyuki was assigned to escort aircraft carrier Hiyō back to Kure Naval Arsenal for repairs.

In January 1943, Hatsuyuki escorted a troop convoy from Pusan to Palau and on to Wewak. She continued to patrol and escort in the Solomon Islands until the end of February, when she was reassigned to the IJN 8th Fleet. In March, Hatsuyuki assisted the survivors of the Battle of Bismarck Sea, before returning to Kure for refit. In May, she escorted aircraft carrier Taiyō from Yokosuka to Manila, Surabaya, Singapore, and back to Mako Guard District to Sasebo Naval District. In June, Hatsuyuki returned to Rabaul, and resumed "Tokyo Express" missions. In the Battle of Kula Gulf off of Kolombangara on 5 July, Hatsuyuki engaged a group of American cruisers and destroyers, and was hit by six dud shells, which damaged her steering and killed six crewmen.

On 17 July 1943, while docked at Shortlands unloading passengers at position 06°50′S 155°47′E, Hatsuyuki was attacked in an air strike by USAAF aircraft. A bomb exploded the after magazine, sinking her in shallow water, with 120 dead (including 38 passengers) and 36 wounded.

On 5 October 1943, Hatsuyuki was removed from the navy list.

Wreck

Her wreck was dived by Chris Leonard in 1975, and on another fourteen occasions, depth 60-85', her midsection is missing due to commercial salvage carried out in the 1960's.
