= List of destroyers of World War II =

This is a list of destroyers of the Second World War.

The List of ships of the Second World War contains major military vessels of the war, arranged alphabetically and by type. The list includes armed vessels that served during the war and in the immediate aftermath, inclusive of localized ongoing combat operations, garrison surrenders, post-surrender occupation, colony re-occupation, troop and prisoner repatriation, to the end of 1945.

For smaller vessels, see also list of World War II ships of less than 1000 tons. Some uncompleted Axis ships are included, out of historic interest. Ships are designated to the country under which they operated for the longest period of the Second World War, regardless of where they were built or previous service history.

Several high-speed transports are incorrectly given the type "destroyer" in the table.

List of destroyers of World War II
Ship	Operator	Class	Type	Displacement (tons)	First commissioned	Fate
Aaron Ward (DD-483)	United States Navy	Gleaves	Destroyer	1,630	4 March 1942	sunk 7 April 1943
Aaron Ward (DM-34)	United States Navy	Robert H. Smith	Destroyer minelayer	2,200	28 October 1944	decommissioned 1945, sold for scrap 1946
Abbot	United States Navy	Fletcher	Destroyer	2,050	23 April 1943	decommissioned 1965, scrapped 1975
Abner Read	United States Navy	Fletcher	Destroyer	2,050	5 February 1943	sunk 1 November 1944
Acasta	Royal Navy	A	Destroyer	1,350	11 February 1930	sunk 8 June 1940
Achates	Royal Navy	A	Destroyer	1,350	27 March 1930	sunk 31 December 1942
Acheron	Royal Navy	A	Destroyer	1,350	13 October 1931	sunk 17 December 1940
Active	Royal Navy	A	Destroyer	1,350	9 February 1930	scrapped 1947
Adams	United States Navy	Robert H. Smith	Destroyer minelayer	2,200	10 October 1944	decommissioned 1946, sold for scrap 1971
Adatepe	Turkish Naval Forces	Adatepe	Destroyer	1,250	18 October 1931	decommissioned February 1954
Æger	Royal Norwegian Navy	Sleipner	Destroyer	735	25 August 1936	bombed and beached 9 April 1940
Aetos	Royal Hellenic Navy	Aetos	Destroyer	880	19 October 1912	decommissioned 1946
Afridi	Royal Navy	Tribal	Destroyer	1,891	3 May 1938	sunk 3 May 1940
Agerholm	United States Navy	Gearing	Destroyer	2,616	20 June 1946	decommissioned 1978, sunk as target 1982
Aigle	French Navy	Aigle	Destroyer	2,402	10 October 1932	scuttled 27 November 1942, refloated 10 July 1943, sunk 24 November 1943, scrapped 1952
Akatsuki	Imperial Japanese Navy	Akatsuki	Destroyer	1,750	30 November 1932	sunk 13 November 1942
Akebono	Imperial Japanese Navy	Ayanami	Destroyer	1,750	31 July 1931	sunk 13 November 1944
Akigumo	Imperial Japanese Navy	Kagerō	Destroyer	2,032	27 September 1941	sunk 11 April 1944
Akishimo	Imperial Japanese Navy	Yūgumo	Destroyer	2,077	11 March 1944	sunk 13 November 1944
Akizuki	Imperial Japanese Navy	Akizuki	Destroyer	2,700	11 June 1942	sunk 25 October 1944
Albatros	French Navy	Aigle	Destroyer	2,402	25 December 1931	decommissioned 9 September 1959
Albert W. Grant	United States Navy	Fletcher	Destroyer	2,050	24 November 1943	decommissioned 1971, scrapped 1972
Alcalá Galiano	Spanish Navy	Churruca	Destroyer	1,620	1932	stricken 1957
Aldea	Chilean Navy	Serrano	Destroyer	1,090	26 July 1929	stricken 12 February 1958
Alden	United States Navy	Clemson	Destroyer	1,215	24 November 1919	scrapped 30 November 1945
Alfred A. Cunningham	United States Navy	Allen M. Sumner	Destroyer	2,200	23 November 1944	decommissioned 1971, sunk as target 1979
Alfredo Oriani	Regia Marina	Oriani	Destroyer	1,750	15 July 1937	to France as D'Estaing 8 August 1948, decommissioned 1954
Algonquin	Royal Canadian Navy	V	Destroyer	1,777	28 February 1944	paid off 1 April 1970
Allen	United States Navy	Sampson	Destroyer	1,111	24 January 1917	sold for scrap 26 September 1946
Allen M. Sumner	United States Navy	Allen M. Sumner	Destroyer	2,200	26 January 1944	scrapped 1974
Almirante Antequera	Spanish Navy	Churruca	Destroyer	1,535	1935	scrapped 8 October 1965
Almirante Condell	Chilean Navy	Almirante Lynch	Destroyer	1,430	1 January 1914	decommissioned 1945
Almirante Guise	Peruvian Navy	Izyaslav	Destroyer	1,785	30 July 1917	scrapped 1954
Almirante Lynch	Chilean Navy	Almirante Lynch	Destroyer	1,430	1913	decommissioned 1945
Almirante Miranda	Spanish Navy	Churruca	Destroyer	1,535	1936	scrapped 23 March 1970
Almirante Valdes	Spanish Navy	Churruca	Destroyer	1,620	1932	stricken 1957
Almirante Villar	Peruvian Navy	Orfey	Destroyer	1,260	12 December 1917	scrapped 1954
Alpino	Regia Marina	Soldati	Destroyer	1,850	20 April 1939	sunk by aircraft 19 April 1943
Alsedo	Spanish Navy	Alsedo	Destroyer	1,044	1924	stricken 1957
Alvise Da Mosto	Regia Marina	Navigatori	Destroyer	1,900	15 March 1931	sunk 1 December 1941
Amagiri	Imperial Japanese Navy	Ayanami	Destroyer	1,750	10 November 1930	sunk 23 April 1944
Amatsukaze	Imperial Japanese Navy	Kagerō	Destroyer	2,032	26 October 1940	scuttled 10 April 1945
Amazon	Royal Navy	prototype	Destroyer	1,350	5 May 1927	Scrapped 25 October 1948
Ambuscade	Royal Navy	prototype	Destroyer	1,173	15 March 1927	Scrapped 1946
Ammen	United States Navy	Fletcher	Destroyer	2,050	12 March 1943	Scrapped 1960
Anderson	United States Navy	Sims	Destroyer	1,570	19 May 1939	Sunk in A-bomb test 1946
Annapolis	Royal Canadian Navy	Town	Destroyer	1,190	24 September 1940	paid off 4 June 1945
Antelope	Royal Navy	A	Destroyer	1,350	20 March 1930	Scrapped 1946
Anthony	Royal Navy	A	Destroyer	1,350	14 February 1930	Scrapped 1948
Anthony	United States Navy	Fletcher	Destroyer	2,050	26 February 1943	To West Germany 1958, sunk as target 1979
Antioquia	Colombian National Navy	Antioquia	Destroyer	1,219	29 March 1933	scrapped November 1961
Antonio da Noli	Regia Marina	Navigatori	Destroyer	1,900	29 December 1929	sunk by mine 9 September 1943
Antonio Pigafetta	Regia Marina	Navigatori	Destroyer	1,900	1 May 1931	captured by Germany as TA44 9 September 1943, sunk by aircraft 17 February 1945
Antoniotto Usodimare	Regia Marina	Navigatori	Destroyer	1,900	21 November 1929	sunk 8 June 1942
Aquilone	Regia Marina	Turbine	Destroyer	1,070	3 December 1927	sunk 17 September 1940
Aoi	Imperial Japanese Navy	Momi	Destroyer	850	20 December 1920	converted to patrol boat Dai-32-Gō shōkaitei 1 April 1940, destroyed 23 December 1941
Arare	Imperial Japanese Navy	Asashio	Destroyer	2,370	15 April 1939	sunk 5 July 1942
Arashi	Imperial Japanese Navy	Kagerō	Destroyer	2,032	25 November 1940	sunk 7 August 1943
Arashio	Imperial Japanese Navy	Asashio	Destroyer	2,370	30 December 1937	sunk 4 March 1943
Ariake	Imperial Japanese Navy	Hatsuharu	Destroyer	1,802	25 March 1935	sunk 28 July 1943
Ardent	Royal Navy	A	Destroyer	1,350	14 April 1930	Sunk 8 June 1940
Armada	Royal Navy	Battle	Destroyer	2,325	2 July 1945	paid off 1960, scrapped 1965
Arrow	Royal Navy	A	Destroyer	1,350	14 April 1930	Irreparably damaged, 1944
Arnold J. Isbell	United States Navy	Gearing	Destroyer	2,616	5 January 1946	to Greece as Sachtouris 1973, scrapped 2002
Artem	Soviet Navy	Orfey	Destroyer	1,260	23 October 1916	sunk 28 August 1941
Artigliere	Regia Marina	Soldati	Destroyer	1,850	14 November 1938	sunk 13 October 1940
Arunta	Royal Australian Navy	Tribal	Destroyer	1,990	30 March 1942	sold for scrap 1968, sunk while under tow 1969
Asagiri	Imperial Japanese Navy	Ayanami	Destroyer	1,750	30 June 1930	sunk 28 August 1942
Asagumo	Imperial Japanese Navy	Asashio	Destroyer	2,370	31 March 1938	sunk 25 October 1944
Asashimo	Imperial Japanese Navy	Yūgumo	Destroyer	2,077	27 November 1943	sunk 7 April 1945
Asashio	Imperial Japanese Navy	Asashio	Destroyer	2,370	31 August 1937	sunk 3 March 1943
Ascari	Regia Marina	Soldati	Destroyer	1,850	6 May 1939	sunk by mines 24 March 1943
Ashanti	Royal Navy	Tribal	Destroyer	1,891	21 December 1938	scrapped 1949
Ashi	Imperial Japanese Navy	Momi	Destroyer	850	29 October 1921	decommissioned 1 February 1940, converted to auxiliary ship Dai-2 Tomariura, scrapped 1947
Aspis	Royal Hellenic Navy	Niki	Destroyer	350	3 April 1907	stricken 1945 and scrapped
Assiniboine	Royal Canadian Navy	River	Destroyer flotilla leader	1,390	30 May 1932	transferred to RCN 19 October 1939, paid off 8 August 1945
Athabaskan (G07)	Royal Canadian Navy	Tribal	Destroyer	1,927	3 February 1943	sunk 29 April 1944
Athabaskan (R79)	Royal Canadian Navy	Tribal	Destroyer	1,927	20 January 1948	launched 4 May 1946, scrapped 1969
Augusto Riboty	Regia Marina	Mirabello	Destroyer	1,756	5 May 1917	to USSR as war reparation, scrapped 1951
Aulick	United States Navy	Fletcher	Destroyer	2,050	27 October 1942	to Greece 1959, scrapped 1997
Ault	United States Navy	Allen M. Sumner	Destroyer	2,200	31 May 1944	scrapped 1974
Aviere	Regia Marina	Soldati	Destroyer	1,850	31 August 1937	sunk by torpedo 17 December 1942
Ayanami	Imperial Japanese Navy	Ayanami	Destroyer	1,750	30 April 1930	sunk 15 November 1942
Aylwin	United States Navy	Farragut	Destroyer	1,365	1 March 1935	Scrapped 1947
Babbitt	United States Navy	Wickes	Destroyer	1,190	24 October 1919	scrapped 1946
Bache	United States Navy	Fletcher	Destroyer	2,050	14 November 1942	scrapped 1968
Badger	United States Navy	Wickes	Destroyer	1,190	29 May 1919	scrapped 1945
Bagley	United States Navy	Bagley	Destroyer	1,500	12 June 1937	scrapped 1947
Bailey	United States Navy	Benson	Destroyer	1,620	11 May 1942	decommissioned 1946, sunk as target 1969
Bainbridge	United States Navy	Clemson	Destroyer	1,215	9 February 1921	scrapped 1945
Baku	Soviet Navy	Leningrad	Destroyer flotilla leader	2,350	27 December 1939	scrapped 30 July 1963
Balch	United States Navy	Porter	Destroyer	1,850	20 October 1936	scrapped 1946
Balder	Royal Norwegian Navy; Kriegsmarine	Sleipner	Destroyer	735	26 June 1940	captured incomplete by Germany April 1940, commissioned as Leopard 26 June 1940, returned to Norway May 1945, scrapped 1952
Baldwin	United States Navy	Gleaves	Destroyer	1,630	30 April 1943	decommissioned 1946, scuttled 1961
Baleno	Regia Marina	Folgore	Destroyer	1,220	15 June 1932	ran aground and wrecked 17 April 1941
Ballard	United States Navy	Clemson	Destroyer	1,215	5 June 1919	sold for scrap 23 May 1946
Banckert	Royal Netherlands Navy	Admiralen	Destroyer	1,316	14 November 1930	scuttled 2 March 1942, captured by Japan, later returned and sunk as target ship, September 1949
Bancroft	United States Navy	Benson	Destroyer	1,620	30 April 1942	decommissioned 1946, scrapped 1973
Barfleur	Royal Navy	Battle	Destroyer	2,325	14 September 1944	paid off 1958, scrapped 1966
Barker	United States Navy	Clemson	Destroyer	1,215	17 December 1919	scrapped 1945
Barney	United States Navy	Wickes	Destroyer	1,190	14 March 1919	scrapped 1946
Barry	United States Navy	Clemson	Destroyer	1,215	15 November 1921	sunk 21 June 1945
Barton (DD-599)	United States Navy	Benson	Destroyer	1,620	29 May 1942	sunk 13 November 1942
Barton (DD-722)	United States Navy	Allen M. Sumner	Destroyer	2,200	30 December 1943	sunk as target 1969
Basilisk	Royal Navy	B	Destroyer	1,350	4 March 1931	sunk 1 June 1940
Basque	French Navy; Free French Naval Forces	L'Adroit	Destroyer	1,360	5 March 1931	decommissioned 1 January 1949, stricken 10 December 1952
Bataan	Royal Australian Navy	Tribal	Destroyer	2,116	25 May 1945	scrapped 1958
Bath	Royal Navy; Royal Norwegian Navy	Town	Destroyer	1,190	23 September 1940	to Norway as HNoMS Bath 9 January 1941, sunk on 19 August 1941
Bausell	United States Navy	Gearing	Destroyer	2,616	7 February 1946	decommissioned 1978, sunk as target 1987
Bditelny	Soviet Navy	Gnevny	Destroyer	1,587	22 October 1939	sunk 2 July 1942
Beagle	Royal Navy	B	Destroyer	1,350	9 April 1931	scrapped January 1946
Beale	United States Navy	Fletcher	Destroyer	2,050	23 December 1942	sunk as target 1969
Bearss	United States Navy	Fletcher	Destroyer	2,050	12 April 1944	decommissioned 1963, scrapped 1976
Beatty (DD-640)	United States Navy	Gleaves	Destroyer	1,630	7 May 1942	sunk 6 November 1943
Beatty (DD-756)	United States Navy	Allen M. Sumner	Destroyer	2,200	31 March 1945	to Venezuela as Carabobo 1972, scrapped 1981
Bedouin	Royal Navy	Tribal	Destroyer	1,891	15 March 1939	sunk 15 June 1942
Belknap	United States Navy	Clemson	Destroyer	1,215	28 April 1919	sold for scrap 30 November 1945
Bell	United States Navy	Fletcher	Destroyer	2,050	4 March 1943	decommissioned 1946, sunk as target 1975
Belmont	Royal Navy	Town	Destroyer	1,200	8 October 1940	sunk 31 January 1942
Benham (DD-397)	United States Navy	Benham	Destroyer	1,656	2 February 1939	sunk 15 November 1942
Benham (DD-796)	United States Navy	Fletcher	Destroyer	2,050	20 December 1943	to Peru 1960, scrapped 1980
Benner	United States Navy	Gearing	Destroyer	2,616	13 February 1945	dcommissioned 1970, scrapped 1975
Bennett	United States Navy	Fletcher	Destroyer	2,050	9 February 1943	to Brazil 1959, scrapped 1978
Bennion	United States Navy	Fletcher	Destroyer	2,050	14 December 1943	decommissioned 1946, scrapped 1973
Benson	United States Navy	Benson	Destroyer	1,620	25 July 1940	transferred to Taiwan 1954, scrapped 1974
Beograd	Royal Yugoslav Navy; Regia Marina; Kriegsmarine	Beograd	Destroyer	1,190	28 April 1939	captured by Italy as Sebenico 17 April 1941, captured by Germany as TA43 9 September 1943, scuttled 1 May 1945
Bernadou	United States Navy	Wickes	Destroyer	1,190	19 May 1919	scrapped 1945
Bersagliere	Regia Marina	Soldati	Destroyer	1,850	1 April 1939	sunk by aircraft 7 January 1943
Besposhchadny	Soviet Navy	Gnevny	Destroyer	1,587	2 October 1939	sunk 6 October 1943
Beverley	Royal Navy	Town	Destroyer	1,200	8 October 1940	sunk 11 April 1943
Bezuprechny	Soviet Navy	Gnevny	Destroyer	1,587	2 October 1939	sunk 26 June 1942
Biddle	United States Navy	Wickes	Destroyer	1,190	22 April 1919	scrapped 1946
Bison	French Navy	Guépard	Destroyer	2,398	10 October 1930	sunk 3 May 1940
Black	United States Navy	Fletcher	Destroyer	2,050	21 May 1943	scrapped 1971
Blakeley	United States Navy	Wickes	Destroyer	1,190	8 May 1919	scrapped 1945
Blanche	Royal Navy	B	Destroyer	1,350	14 February 1931	sunk 13 November 1939
Blue (DD-387)	United States Navy	Bagley	Destroyer	1,500	14 August 1937	sunk 22 August 1942
Blue (DD-744)	United States Navy	Allen M. Sumner	Destroyer	2,200	20 March 1944	sunk as target 1974
Błyskawica	Polish Navy	Grom	Destroyer	2,011	25 November 1937	decommissioned 1 May 1976, preserved as museum ship
Boadicea	Royal Navy	B	Destroyer	1,350	7 April 1931	sunk 13 June 1944
Bodry	Soviet Navy	Gnevny	Destroyer	1,587	1 March 1939	scrapped early 1960s
Boggs	United States Navy	Wickes	Destroyer minesweeper	1,190	23 September 1918	sold for scrap 27 November 1946
Bombardiere	Regia Marina	Soldati	Destroyer	1,850	15 July 1942	sunk by submarine 17 January 1943
Bordelais	French Navy	L'Adroit	Destroyer	1,360	8 April 1930	scuttled 27 November 1942
Bordelon	United States Navy	Gearing	Destroyer	2,616	5 June 1945	to Iran as spare parts 1977
Borea	Regia Marina	Turbine	Destroyer	1,070	14 November 1927	sunk 17 September 1940
Boreas	Royal Navy; Royal Hellenic Navy	B	Destroyer	1,350	20 February 1931	to Greece as Salamis 1944, scrapped 1951
Borie (DD-215)	United States Navy	Clemson	Destroyer	1,215	24 March 1920	sank 2 November 1943 after ramming and sinking U-405
Borie (DD-704)	United States Navy	Allen M. Sumner	Destroyer	2,200	21 September 1944	to Argentina as Hipólito Bouchard 1972, scrapped 1984
Boulonnais	French Navy	L'Adroit	Destroyer	1,360	25 June 1929	sunk 8 November 1942
Bourrasque	French Navy	Bourrasque	Destroyer	1,300	23 September 1926	sunk 30 May 1940
Boyd	United States Navy	Fletcher	Destroyer	2,050	8 May 1943	to Turkey 1969, scrapped 1981
Boyky	Soviet Navy	Gnevny	Destroyer	1,587	17 May 1939	sunk as target 9 February 1962
Boyle	United States Navy	Benson	Destroyer	1,620	15 August 1942	decommissioned 1946, sunk as target 1973
Bradford	Royal Navy	Town	Destroyer	1,200	8 October 1940	scrapped 1946
Bradford	United States Navy	Fletcher	Destroyer	2,050	12 June 1943	to Greece 1962, scrapped 1981
Braine	United States Navy	Fletcher	Destroyer	2,050	11 May 1943	to Argentina 1971, sunk as target 1983
Brazen	Royal Navy	B	Destroyer	1,350	8 April 1931	sunk 20 July 1940
Breckinridge	United States Navy	Wickes	Destroyer	1,190	27 February 1919	scrapped 1946
Breese	United States Navy	Wickes	Destroyer minelayer	1,190	23 October 1918	sold for scrap 16 May 1946
Brestois	French Navy	L'Adroit	Destroyer	1,360	15 June 1928	sunk 8 November 1942
Brighton	Royal Navy; Soviet Navy	Town	Destroyer	1,200	23 September 1940	to USSR as Zharky 16 July 1944
Brilliant	Royal Navy	B	Destroyer	1,350	21 February 1931	scrapped August 1947
Brinkley Bass	United States Navy	Gearing	Destroyer	2,616	1 October 1945	to Brazil as Mariz e Barros 1973, sunk as target 2000
Bristol (DD-453)	United States Navy	Gleaves	Destroyer	1,630	22 October 1941	sunk 13 October 1943
Bristol (DD-857)	United States Navy	Allen M. Sumner	Destroyer	2,200	17 March 1945	to Taiwan as Hua Yang 1969, scrapped 1994
Broadwater	Royal Navy	Town	Destroyer	1,200	9 October 1940	sunk 18 October 1941
Broadway	Royal Navy	Town	Destroyer	1,200	8 October 1940	scrapped 1947
Broke	Royal Navy	Thornycroft type	Destroyer flotilla leader	1,480	15 April 1925	sunk 8 November 1942
Brooks	United States Navy	Clemson	Destroyer	1,215	18 June 1920	constructive loss 6 January 1945, scrapped
Broome	United States Navy	Clemson	Destroyer	1,200	31 October 1919	scrapped 1946
Brown	United States Navy	Fletcher	Destroyer	2,050	10 July 1943	to Greece 1962, scrapped 1981
Brownson (DD-518)	United States Navy	Fletcher	Destroyer	2,050	3 February 1943	sunk 26 December 1943
Brownson (DD-868)	United States Navy	Gearing	Destroyer	2,616	17 November 1945	decommissioned 1976, scrapped 1977
Bruce	Royal Navy	Admiralty type	Destroyer flotilla leader	1,801	29 May 1918	scuttled 22 November 1939
Brush	United States Navy	Allen M. Sumner	Destroyer	2,200	17 April 1944	to Taiwan as Hsiang Yang 1969, decommissioned 1984 and later scrapped
Bryant	United States Navy	Fletcher	Destroyer	2,050	4 December 1943	decommissioned 1947, sunk as a target 1969
Buchanan	United States Navy	Gleaves	Destroyer	1,630	21 March 1942	to Turkey 1949, scrapped 1976
Buck (DD-420)	United States Navy	Sims	Destroyer	1,570	15 May 1940	sunk 9 October 1943
Buck (DD-761)	United States Navy	Allen M. Sumner	Destroyer	2,200	28 June 1946	to Brazil as Alagoas 1973, scrapped 1995
Buenos Aires	Argentine Navy	Buenos Aires	Destroyer	1,353	4 April 1938	1971
Bullard	United States Navy	Fletcher	Destroyer	2,050	9 April 1943	decommissioned 1946, scrapped 1973
Bulldog	Royal Navy	B	Destroyer	1,350	8 April 1931	scrapped January 1946
Bulmer	United States Navy	Clemson	Destroyer	1,215	16 August 1920	scrapped 1947
Burnham	Royal Navy	Town	Destroyer	1,200	8 October 1940	scrapped 1948
Burns	United States Navy	Fletcher	Destroyer	2,050	3 April 1943	decommissioned 1946, sunk as target 1974
Burwell	Royal Navy	Town	Destroyer	1,200	8 October 1940	scrapped 1947
Burza	Polish Navy	Wicher	Destroyer	1,400	10 July 1932	scrapped 1977
Bush	United States Navy	Fletcher	Destroyer	2,050	10 May 1943	sunk 6 April 1945
Butler	United States Navy	Gleaves	Destroyer	1,630	15 August 1942	scrapped 1948
Buxton	Royal Navy; Royal Canadian Navy	Town	Destroyer	1,215	8 October 1940	to RCN August 1942 as Buxton; paid off 1945
Bystry	Soviet Navy	Gnevny	Destroyer	1,587	7 March 1939	sunk September 1941
Cadiz	Royal Navy	Battle	Destroyer	2,325	12 April 1946	paid off 1953
Caesar	Royal Navy	C ("Ca")	Destroyer flotilla leader	1,710	5 October 1944	paid off June 1965, scrapped 1967
Caldas	Colombian National Navy	Antioquia	Destroyer	1,219	16 May 1934	scrapped 1961
Caldwell	Royal Navy; Royal Canadian Navy	Town	Destroyer	1,190	24 September 1940	to RCN 1942, scrapped 1944
Caldwell	United States Navy	Benson	Destroyer	1,620	10 June 1942	decommissioned 1946, scrapped 1966
Callaghan	United States Navy	Fletcher	Destroyer	2,050	27 November 1943	sunk 28 July 1945
Cambrian	Royal Navy	C ("Ca")	Destroyer	1,710	14 July 1944	paid off December 1968, scrapped 1971
Cameron	Royal Navy	Town	Destroyer	1,190	24 September 1940	constructive loss 5 December 1940
Camicia Nera	Regia Marina	Soldati	Destroyer	1,850	30 June 1938	renamed Artigliere 30 July 1943, to Soviet Union as Lyogky 1 February 1950, struck November 1954 and expended as target
Campbell	Royal Navy	Admiralty type	Destroyer flotilla leader	1,580	21 December 1918	paid off 18 February 1947
Campbeltown	Royal Navy; Royal Netherlands Navy	Town	Destroyer	1,190	9 September 1940	loaned to Netherlands 28 March 1941, returned to UK September 1941, expended as demolition-ship at St Nazaire, 29 March 1942
Camperdown	Royal Navy	Battle	Destroyer	2,325	18 June 1945	paid off 18 June 1945, scrapped 1970
Caperton	United States Navy	Fletcher	Destroyer	2,050	30 June 1943	decommissioned 1960, sunk as target
Capps	United States Navy	Fletcher	Destroyer	2,050	23 June 1943	To Spain 1957, scrapped 1985
Caprice	Royal Navy	C ("Ca")	Destroyer	1,710	5 April 1944	paid off March 1973, scrapped 1979
Carabiniere	Regia Marina	Soldati	Destroyer	1,850	20 December 1938	scrapped 1978
Carlo Mirabello	Regia Marina	Mirabello	Destroyer	1,756	24 August 1916	sunk by mines 21 May 1941
Carmick	United States Navy	Gleaves	Destroyer	1,630	28 December 1942	decommissioned 1954, scrapped 1972
Carrista	Regia Marina	Soldati	Destroyer	1,850	Never commissioned	construction incomplete, captured by Germany after Italian armistice and later scrapped
Carron	Royal Navy	C ("Ca")	Destroyer	1,710	6 November 1944	paid off March 1963, scrapped 1967
Carysfort	Royal Navy	C ("Ca")	Destroyer	1,710	20 February 1945	paid off February 1969, scrapped 1970
Case	United States Navy	Mahan	Destroyer	1,450	15 September 1936	scrapped 1948
Cassandra	Royal Navy	C ("Ca")	Destroyer	1,710	28 July 1944	paid off January 1966, scrapped 1967
Cassard	French Navy	Vauquelin	Destroyer	2,402	1 November 1932	scuttled 27 November 1942, scrapped 1950
Cassin	United States Navy	Mahan	Destroyer	1,450	21 August 1936	destroyed 7 December 1941 but "rebuilt," scrapped 1948
Cassin Young	United States Navy	Fletcher	Destroyer	2,050	31 December 1943	decommissioned 1960, museum ship at Boston, MA
Castleton	Royal Navy	Town	Destroyer	1,190	9 September 1940	scrapped 1947
Casque	French Navy	Le Hardi	Destroyer	1,772	20 June 1940	scuttled 27 November 1942, refloated and scrapped 1948
Catamarca	Argentine Navy	Catamarca	Destroyer	1,010	13 April 1912	Sold 1959
Cavalier	Royal Navy	C ("Ca")	Destroyer	1,710	22 November 1944	Paid off July 1972 museum ship
Cavendish	Royal Navy	C ("Ca")	Destroyer flotilla leader	1,710	13 December 1944	paid off 1964, scrapped 1967
Cayuga	Royal Canadian Navy	Tribal	Destroyer	1,927	20 October 1947	built and launched during the war, paid off 27 February 1964, scrapped 1965
Cervantes	Argentine Navy	Cervantes	Destroyer	1,522	3 September 1927	discarded 24 June 1961
Cesare Battisti	Regia Marina	Sauro	Destroyer	1,041	13 April 1927	scuttled 3 April 1941
Ceuta	Spanish Navy	Vifor	Destroyer	1,594	20 January 1920	scrapped 1948
Chacal	French Navy	Chacal	Destroyer	2,092	12 June 1926	beached 24 May 1940
Champlin	United States Navy	Benson	Destroyer	1,620	12 September 1942	decommissioned 1947, scrapped 1972
Chandler	United States Navy	Clemson	Destroyer minesweeper	1,215	5 September 1919	sold for scrap 18 November 1946
Chaplet	Royal Navy	C ("Ch")	Destroyer	1,710	24 August 1945	Laid up 1961. Sold for scrapping 1965.
Charity	Royal Navy	C ("Ch")	Destroyer	1,710	19 November 1945	paid off 16 June 1958
Charles Ausburne	United States Navy	Fletcher	Destroyer	2,050	24 November 1942	scrapped 1968
Charles F. Hughes	United States Navy	Benson	Destroyer	1,620	5 September 1940	decommissioned 1946, sunk as target 1969
Charles H. Roan	United States Navy	Gearing	Destroyer	2,616	12 September 1946	to Turkey as Mareşal Fevzi Çakmak 1973, scrapped 1995
Charles J. Badger	United States Navy	Fletcher	Destroyer	2,050	23 July 1943	decommissioned 1957, scrapped 1974
Charles P. Cecil	United States Navy	Gearing	Destroyer	2,616	29 June 1945	to Greece as Apostolis 1980, scrapped 2003
Charles R. Ware	United States Navy	Gearing	Destroyer	2,616	21 July 1945	decommissioned 1974, sunk as target 1981
Charles S. Sperry	United States Navy	Allen M. Sumner	Destroyer	2,200	17 May 1944	to Chile as Ministro Zenteno 1974, scrapped 1990
Charlestown	Royal Navy	Town	Destroyer	1,190	23 September 1940	scrapped 1947
Charrette	United States Navy	Fletcher	Destroyer	2,050	18 May 1943	to Greece 1959, museum ship at Athens
Chauncey	United States Navy	Fletcher	Destroyer	2,050	31 May 1943	decommissioned 1954, scrapped 1972
Chelsea	Royal Navy; Royal Canadian Navy; Soviet Navy	Town	Destroyer	1,190	9 September 1940	to Canada November 1942, to USSR July 1944 as Derzky
Chequers	Royal Navy	C ("Ch")	Destroyer flotilla leader	1,710	28 September 1945	scrapped 1966
Chesterfield	Royal Navy	Town	Destroyer	1,190	9 September 1940	scrapped 1947
Chevalier (DD-451)	United States Navy	Fletcher	Destroyer	2,050	20 June 1942	sunk 7 October 1943
Chevalier (DD-805)	United States Navy	Gearing	Destroyer	2,616	9 January 1945	to South Korea as Chungbuk 1977, scrapped 2000
Chevalier Paul	French Navy	Vauquelin	Destroyer	2,402	20 July 1934	sunk 16 June 1941
Cheviot	Royal Navy	C ("Ch")	Destroyer	1,710	11 December 1945	sold for scrap 1962
Chevron	Royal Navy	C ("Ch")	Destroyer	1,710	23 August 1945	scrapped 1969
Chew	United States Navy	Wickes	Destroyer	1,190	12 December 1918	scrapped 1946
Chieftain	Royal Navy	C ("Ch")	Destroyer	1,710	7 March 1946	scrapped 1961
Childers	Royal Navy	C ("Ch")	Destroyer flotilla leader	1,906	19 December 1945	laid up 1958, sold for scrap 1963
Childs	United States Navy	Clemson	Destroyer	1,215	22 October 1920	sold for scrap 23 May 1946
Chivalrous	Royal Navy	C ("Ch")	Destroyer	1,710	13 May 1946	to Pakistan 29 June 1954 as Taimur, scrapped 1961
Churchill	Royal Navy; Soviet Navy	Town	Destroyer	1,190	9 September 1940	to USSR as Deyatelny 16 July 1944, sunk 16 January 1945
Churruca	Spanish Navy	Churruca	Destroyer	1,620	1932	stricken 1960s
Císcar	Spanish Navy	Churruca	Destroyer	1,535	1937	ran aground 17 October 1957
Clare	Royal Navy	Town	Destroyer	1,190	9 September 1940	scrapped 1945
Clarence K. Bronson	United States Navy	Fletcher	Destroyer	2,050	11 June 1943	to Turkey 1967, scrapped 1987
Clark	United States Navy	Porter	Destroyer	1,850	20 May 1936	scrapped 1946
Claxton	United States Navy	Fletcher	Destroyer	2,050	8 December 1942	to West Germany 1959
Clemson	United States Navy	Clemson	Destroyer	1,215	29 December 1919	decommissioned 12 October 1945
Cockade	Royal Navy	C ("Co")	Destroyer	1,885	29 September 1945	Paid off 1958, scrapped 1964
Codrington	Royal Navy	A	Destroyer	1,350	4 June 1930	sunk 27 July 1940
Coghlan	United States Navy	Benson	Destroyer	1,620	10 July 1942	decommissioned 1947, scrapped 1974
Cogswell	United States Navy	Fletcher	Destroyer	2,050	17 August 1943	to Turkey 1969, scrapped 1980
Colahan	United States Navy	Fletcher	Destroyer	2,050	23 August 1943	sunk as target 1966
Cole	United States Navy	Wickes	Destroyer	1,190	19 June 1919	scrapped 1947
Colhoun (DD-85)	United States Navy	Wickes	Destroyer	1,060	13 June 1918	sunk 30 August 1942
Colhoun (DD-801)	United States Navy	Fletcher	Destroyer	2,050	8 July 1944	Sunk 6 April 1945
Collett	United States Navy	Allen M. Sumner	Destroyer	2,200	16 May 1944	to Argentina as Piedrabuena 1974, sunk as target 1988
Columbia	Royal Canadian Navy	Town	Destroyer	1,060	24 September 1940	paid off August 1945
Comet	Royal Navy	C ("Co")	Destroyer	1,885	6 June 1945	Paid off 1958, scrapped 1962
Commandante Baroni	Regia Marina	Comandanti Medaglie d'Oro	Destroyer	2,100	Never commissioned	laid down 14 December 1942, 19.5% completed as of August 1943, scrapped by Germany sometime after Armistice of Cassibile
Commandante Borsini	Regia Marina	Comandanti Medaglie d'Oro	Destroyer	2,100	Never commissioned	laid down 29 April 1943, 17.5% completed as of August 1943, scrapped by Germany during the war
Commandante Botti	Regia Marina	Comandanti Medaglie d'Oro	Destroyer	2,100	Never commissioned	laid down 1 August 1943, 4% completed as of August 1943, scrapped by Germany during the war
Commandante Casana	Regia Marina	Comandanti Medaglie d'Oro	Destroyer	2,100	Never commissioned	laid down 14 February 1943, 18% completed as of August 1943, scrapped by Germany 1944
Commandante De Cristofaro	Regia Marina	Comandanti Medaglie d'Oro	Destroyer	2,100	Never commissioned	laid down 6 March 1943, 15.5% completed as of August 1943, scrapped by Germany during the war
Commandante Dell'Anno	Regia Marina	Comandanti Medaglie d'Oro	Destroyer	2,100	Never commissioned	laid down 14 February 1943, 19% completed as of August 1943, scrapped by Germany 1944
Commandante Fontana	Regia Marina	Comandanti Medaglie d'Oro	Destroyer	2,100	Never commissioned	laid down late 1943, 9% completed as of August 1943, scrapped
Commandante Margottini	Regia Marina	Comandanti Medaglie d'Oro	Destroyer	2,100	Never commissioned	laid down 10 March 1943, launched early 1944, 20% completed as of August 1943, sunk by aircraft 23 September 1944
Commandante Ruta	Regia Marina	Comandanti Medaglie d'Oro	Destroyer	2,100	Never commissioned	laid down 16 August 1943, 4% completed as of August 1943, scrapped by Germany during the war
Commandante Toscano	Regia Marina	Comandanti Medaglie d'Oro	Destroyer	2,100	Never commissioned	laid down 14 December 1942, 17% completed as of August 1943, scrapped by Germany during the war
Compton	United States Navy	Allen M. Sumner	Destroyer	2,200	4 November 1944	to Brazil as Mato Grosso 1972, scrapped 1990
Comus	Royal Navy	C ("Co")	Destroyer	1,885	8 July 1946	sold for scrap 1958
Concord	Royal Navy	C ("Co")	Destroyer	1,885	20 December 1946	sold for scrap 1962
Cone	United States Navy	Gearing	Destroyer	2,616	18 August 1945	to Pakistan as Alamgir 1982, scrapped 1998
Conner	United States Navy	Fletcher	Destroyer	2,050	8 June 1943	to Greece 1959, scrapped 1997
Consort	Royal Navy	C ("Co")	Destroyer	1,885	19 March 1946	sold for scrap 1961
Constance	Royal Navy	C ("Co")	Destroyer flotilla leader	1,885	31 December 1945	sold for scrap 1956
Contest	Royal Navy	C ("Co")	Destroyer	1,885	9 November 1945	scrapped 1960
Converse	United States Navy	Fletcher	Destroyer	2,050	20 November 1942	to Spain 1959, scrapped 1988
Conway	United States Navy	Fletcher	Destroyer	2,050	9 October 1942	sunk as target 1970
Cony	United States Navy	Fletcher	Destroyer	2,050	30 October 1942	sunk as target 1970
Conyngham	United States Navy	Mahan	Destroyer	1,450	4 November 1936	scuttled 1948 after A-bomb test
Cooper	United States Navy	Allen M. Sumner	Destroyer	2,200	27 March 1944	sunk 3 December 1944
Corazziere	Regia Marina	Soldati	Destroyer	1,850	4 March 1939	scuttled 9 September 1943
Córdoba	Argentine Navy	La Plata	Destroyer	875	8 July 1912	discarded 10 January 1956
Corrientes	Argentine Navy	Buenos Aires	Destroyer	1,353	1 July 1938	sunk in collision with cruiser ARA Almirante Brown 3 October 1941
Corry (DD-463)	United States Navy	Gleaves	Destroyer	1,630	18 December 1941	sunk 6 June 1944
Corry (DD-817)	United States Navy	Gearing	Destroyer	2,616	27 February 1946	to Greece as Kriezis 1981, scrapped 2002
Corsaro	Regia Marina	Soldati	Destroyer	1,850	16 May 1942	sunk by mine 9 January 1943
Cossack (F03)	Royal Navy	Tribal	Destroyer	1,891	14 June 1938	sunk 27 October 1941
Cossack (R57)	Royal Navy	C ("Co")	Destroyer flotilla leader	1,885	4 September 1945	scrapped 1961
Cotten	United States Navy	Fletcher	Destroyer	2,050	24 July 1943	decommissioned 1960, scrapped 1975
Cowell	United States Navy	Fletcher	Destroyer	2,050	23 August 1943	to Argentina 1971, scrapped 1982
Cowie	United States Navy	Gleaves	Destroyer	1,630	1 June 1942	decommissioned 1947, scrapped 1972
Crane	United States Navy	Wickes	Destroyer	1,190	18 April 1919	scrapped 1946
Craven	United States Navy	Gridley	Destroyer	1,590	2 September 1937	scrapped 1947
Creole	Royal Navy	C ("Cr")	Destroyer	1,900	14 October 1946	to Pakistan as Alamgir 20 June 1958, scrapped 1982
Crescent	Royal Canadian Navy	C ("Cr")	Destroyer flotilla leader	1,900	21 August 1945	delivered to Canada January 1945, scrapped 1971
Crispin	Royal Navy	C ("Cr")	Destroyer	1,900	10 July 1946	to Pakistan as Jahangir 18 March 1958, scrapped 1982
Cromwell	Royal Navy	C ("Cr")	Destroyer	1,900	16 September 1946	to Norway as Bergen 1946, scrapped 1967
Crosby	United States Navy	Wickes	Destroyer	1,190	24 January 1919	scrapped 1946
Crown	Royal Navy	C ("Cr")	Destroyer	1,900	17 April 1947	to Norway as Oslo 1945, scrapped 1968
Croziers	Royal Canadian Navy	C ("Cr")	Destroyer	1,900	30 November 1945	to Norway 1946
Crusader	Royal Canadian Navy	C ("Cr")	Destroyer flotilla leader	1,900	26 November 1945	delivered to Canada January 1945, scrapped 1971
Crystal	Royal Navy	C ("Cr")	Destroyer	1,900	6 February 1946	to Norway as Stavanger 1945, scrapped 1967
Cummings	United States Navy	Mahan	Destroyer	1,450	25 November 1936	scrapped 1947
Cushing (DD-376)	United States Navy	Mahan	Destroyer	1,450	28 August 1936	sunk 13 November 1942
Cushing (DD-797)	United States Navy	Fletcher	Destroyer	2,050	17 January 1944	to Brazil 1961, scrapped 1982
Cyclone	French Navy	Bourrasque	Destroyer	1,300	15 March 1927	scuttled 18 June 1940
Dahlgren	United States Navy	Clemson	Destroyer	1,215	6 January 1920	scrapped 1946
Dainty	Royal Navy	D	Destroyer	1,375	22 December 1932	sunk 24 February 1941
Dale	United States Navy	Farragut	Destroyer	1,365	17 June 1935	scrapped 1947
Dallas	United States Navy	Clemson	Destroyer	1,215	29 October 1920	scrapped 1945
Daly	United States Navy	Fletcher	Destroyer	2,050	24 October 1942	decommissioned 1960, scrapped 1976
Damato (DD-871)	United States Navy	Gearing	Destroyer	2,616	27 April 1946	to Pakistan as Tippu Sultan 1980, scrapped 1994
Daniele Manin	Regia Marina	Sauro	Destroyer	1,041	1 March 1927	sunk by aircraft 3 April 1941
Dão	Portuguese Navy	Douro	Destroyer	1,219	5 January 1935	stricken 29 November 1960
Dardo	Regia Marina	Dardo	Destroyer	1,206	25 January 1932	captured by Germany as TA31 September 1943, Ssunk 24 April 1945
Daring	Royal Navy	D	Destroyer	1,375	25 November 1932	sunk 18 February 1940
Dashiell	United States Navy	Fletcher	Destroyer	2,050	20 March 1943	decommissioned 1960, scrapped 1975
David W. Taylor	United States Navy	Fletcher	Destroyer	2,050	18 September 1943	to Spain 1957, scrapped 1987
Davis	United States Navy	Somers	Destroyer	1,850	9 November 1938	scrapped 1947
Davison	United States Navy	Gleaves	Destroyer	1,630	11 September 1942	decommissioned 1949, scrapped 1973
De Haven (DD-469)	United States Navy	Fletcher	Destroyer	2,050	21 June 1942	sunk 1 February 1943
De Haven (DD-727)	United States Navy	Allen M. Sumner	Destroyer	2,200	31 March 1944	to South Korea as Incheon 1973, scrapped 1993
Decatur	United States Navy	Clemson	Destroyer	1,215	9 August 1922	scrapped 1945
Decoy	Royal Navy; Royal Canadian Navy	D	Destroyer	1,375	4 April 1933	to RCN 12 April 1943 as Kootenay, paid off 26 October 1945
Defender	Royal Navy	D	Destroyer	1,397	31 October 1932	sunk 11 July 1941
Delight	Royal Navy	D	Destroyer	1,397	31 January 1933	sunk 29 July 1940
Demirhisar	Turkish Naval Forces	Demirhisar	Destroyer	1,360	1942	decommissioned 1960
Dennis J. Buckley	United States Navy	Gearing	Destroyer	2,616	2 March 1945	decommissioned 1973, scrapped 1974
Dent	United States Navy	Wickes	Destroyer	1,150	9 September 1918	scrapped 1946
Dewey	United States Navy	Farragut	Destroyer	1,365	14 October 1934	scrapped 1946
Diamond	Royal Navy	D	Destroyer	1,375	3 November 1932	sunk 27 April 1941
Diana	Royal Navy; Royal Canadian Navy	D	Destroyer	1,375	21 December 1932	to RCN 6 September 1940 as Margaree, sunk 22 October 1940
Dickerson	United States Navy	Wickes	Destroyer	1,150	3 September 1919	sunk 4 April 1945
Doran	United States Navy	Gleaves	Destroyer	1,630	4 August 1942	decommissioned 1947, scrapped 1973
Dorsey	United States Navy	Wickes	Destroyer	1,150	16 September 1918	grounded in typhoon, 9 October 1945
Dortch	United States Navy	Fletcher	Destroyer	2,050	7 August 1943	to Argentina 1961, scrapped 1977
Douglas	Royal Navy	Admiralty type	Destroyer flotilla leader	1,580	2 September 1918	scrapped 20 March 1945
Douglas H. Fox	United States Navy	Allen M. Sumner	Destroyer	2,200	26 December 1944	to Chile as Ministro Portales 1974, sunk as target 1998
Douro	Portuguese Navy	Douro	Destroyer	1,219	11 February 1936	stricken December 1959
Downes	United States Navy	Mahan	Destroyer	1,450	15 January 1937	destroyed 7 December 1941 but "rebuilt," scrapped 1948
Doyle	United States Navy	Gleaves	Destroyer	1,630	27 January 1943	decommissioned 1955, scrapped 1972
Draug	Royal Norwegian Navy	Draug	Destroyer	578	1908	decommissioned 19 November 1943, sold for scrap 1944
Drayton	United States Navy	Mahan	Destroyer	1,450	1 September 1936	scrapped 1947
Drexler	United States Navy	Allen M. Sumner	Destroyer	2,200	14 November 1944	sunk 28 May 1945
Du Pont	United States Navy	Wickes	Destroyer	1,150	30 April 1919	scrapped 1947
Dubrovnik	Royal Yugoslav Navy; Regia Marina; Kriegsmarine		Destroyer flotilla leader	1,880	11 October 1931	captured by Italy as Premuda 17 April 1941, captured by Germany as TA32 9 September 1943, scuttled 24 April 1945
Duchess	Royal Navy	D	Destroyer	1,375	24 January 1933	sunk in friendly collision 12 December 1939
Duncan	Royal Navy	D	Destroyer flotilla leader	1,400	5 April 1933	paid off May 1945
Duncan (DD-485)	United States Navy	Gleaves	Destroyer	1,630	16 April 1942	sunk 12 October 1942
Duncan (DD-874)	United States Navy	Gearing	Destroyer	2,616	25 February 1945	decommissioned 1971, sunk as target 1980
Dunlap	United States Navy	Mahan	Destroyer	1,450	12 June 1937	scrapped 1948
Dyess	United States Navy	Gearing	Destroyer	2,616	21 May 1945	to Greece as spare parts 1981
Dyson	United States Navy	Fletcher	Destroyer	2,050	30 December 1942	to West Germany 1960, scrapped 1982
Dzerzhinsky	Soviet Navy	Fidonisy	Destroyer	1,460	30 October 1917	sunk 13 May 1942
Earle	United States Navy	Gleaves	Destroyer	1,630	1 September 1942	decommissioned 1947, scrapped 1970
Eaton	United States Navy	Fletcher	Destroyer	2,050	4 December 1942	decommissioned 1969, sunk as target 1970
Eberle	United States Navy	Gleaves	Destroyer	1,630	4 December 1940	to Greece, 22 January 1951, scrapped 1972
Echo	Royal Navy; Royal Hellenic Navy	E	Destroyer	1,428	22 October 1934	to Greece as Navarion 5 April 1944, scrapped April 1956
Eclipse	Royal Navy	E	Destroyer	1,428	29 November 1934	sunk 24 October 1943
Edison	United States Navy	Gleaves	Destroyer	1,630	31 January 1941	decommissioned 1946, scrapped 1966
Edwards	United States Navy	Gleaves	Destroyer	1,630	18 September 1942	decommissioned 1946, scrapped 1973
Edsall	United States Navy	Clemson	Destroyer	1,215	26 November 1920	sunk 1 March 1942
Ehrensköld	Swedish Navy	Ehrensköld	Destroyer	974	14 September 1927	decommissioned 1 April 1963, scrapped 1973
Electra	Royal Navy	E	Destroyer	1,405	13 September 1934	sunk 27 February 1942
Ellet	United States Navy	Benham	Destroyer	1,656	17 February 1939	scrapped 1947
Elliot	United States Navy	Wickes	Destroyer minesweeper	1,190	25 January 1919	sold for scrap 29 January 1946
Ellis	United States Navy	Wickes	Destroyer	1,190	7 June 1919	sold for scrap 17 July 1947
Ellyson	United States Navy	Gleaves	Destroyer	1,630	28 November 1941	to Japan 1954, scrapped 1970
Emanuele Pessagno	Regia Marina	Navigatori	Destroyer	1,900	10 March 1930	sunk 29 May 1942
Emmons	United States Navy	Gleaves	Destroyer	1,630	5 December 1941	sunk 6 April 1945
Encounter	Royal Navy	E	Destroyer	1,405	2 November 1934	sunk 1 March 1942
Endicott	United States Navy	Gleaves	Destroyer	1,630	25 February 1943	decommissioned 1955, scrapped 1970
Engels	Soviet Navy	Orfey	Destroyer	1,260	29 August 1916	sunk 25 August 1941
English	United States Navy	Allen M. Sumner	Destroyer	2,200	4 May 1944	to China as Hui Yang 1970, sunk as target 2003
Enoki	Imperial Japanese Navy	Tachibana	Destroyer	1,288	31 March 1945	sunk 26 June 1945, raised and scrapped 1948
Entre Rios	Argentine Navy	Buenos Aires	Destroyer	1,353	15 May 1938	Scrapped 1973
Épée	French Navy; Regia Marina	Le Hardi	Destroyer	1,772	14 June 1940	renamed as L'Adroit 29 March 1941, scuttled 27 November 1942, refloated as FR33 by Italy 20 April 1943, scrapped September 1945
Épervier	French Navy	Aigle	Destroyer	2,402	1 April 1934	sunk 9 November 1942, raised and scrapped 1946
Erben	United States Navy	Fletcher	Destroyer	2,050	28 May 1943	to South Korea as Chungmu 1963, scrapped 1993
Erevan	Soviet Navy	Kiev	Destroyer flotilla leader	2,350	Never commissioned	launched 29 June 1941, 25.4% complete, construction stopped August 1941, later used as target or scrapped
Ericsson	United States Navy	Gleaves	Destroyer	1,630	13 March 1941	decommissioned 1946, sunk as target 1970
Ernest G. Small	United States Navy	Gearing	Destroyer	2,616	21 August 1945	to Taiwan as Fu Yang 1971, sunk as target 2003
Escaño	Spanish Navy	Churruca	Destroyer	1,535	September 1936	stricken 1960s
Escapade	Royal Navy	E	Destroyer	1,405	30 August 1934	paid off 1946
Escort	Royal Navy	E	Destroyer	1,405	30 October 1934	sunk 11 July 1940
Esk	Royal Navy	E	Destroyer	1,405	28 September 1934	sunk 31 August 1940
Eskimo	Royal Navy	Tribal	Destroyer	1,891	30 December 1938	sold for scrap 27 June 1949
Espero	Regia Marina	Turbine	Destroyer	1,070	30 April 1928	sunk by gunfire 28 June 1940
Eugene A. Greene	United States Navy	Gearing	Destroyer	2,616	8 June 1945	to Spain as Churruca 1972, sunk as target 1991
Euro	Regia Marina	Turbine	Destroyer	1,070	22 December 1927	sunk 3 October 1943
Evans	United States Navy	Fletcher	Destroyer	2,050	11 December 1943	decommissioned 1945, scrapped 1947
Everett F. Larson	United States Navy	Gearing	Destroyer	2,616	6 April 1945	to South Korea as Jeongbuk 1972, preserved as museum ship 1999, scrapped 2021
Eversole	United States Navy	Gearing	Destroyer	2,616	10 May 1946	to Turkey as Gayret 1973, preserved as museum ship 1995
Evertsen	Royal Netherlands Navy	Admiralen	Destroyer	1,316	12 April 1928	sunk 1 March 1942
Exmouth	Royal Navy	E	Destroyer flotilla leader	1,495	9 November 1934	sunk 21 January 1940
Express	Royal Navy; Royal Canadian Navy	E	Destroyer	1,405	29 May 1934	to RCN June 1943 as Gatineau, paid off 1955
Fame	Royal Navy	F	Destroyer	1,405	26 April 1935	to Dominican Republic 4 February 1949
Fanning	United States Navy	Mahan	Destroyer	1,450	8 October 1937	scrapped 1948
Farenholt	United States Navy	Benson	Destroyer	1,620	2 April 1942	decommissioned 1946, scrapped 1972
Farragut	United States Navy	Farragut	Destroyer	1,365	18 June 1934	scrapped 1947
Faulknor	Royal Navy	F	Destroyer flotilla leader	1,475	24 May 1935	paid off 25 July 1945
Fearless	Royal Navy	F	Destroyer	1,428	19 December 1934	scuttled 23 July 1941
Fechteler	United States Navy	Gearing	Destroyer	2,616	2 March 1946	decommissioned 1970, scrapped 1972
Finisterre	Royal Navy	Battle	Destroyer	2,325	11 September 1945	paid off 1965, scrapped 1967
Firedrake	Royal Navy	F	Destroyer	1,405	30 May 1935	sunk 17 December 1942
Fiske	United States Navy	Gearing	Destroyer	2,616	28 November 1945	to Turkey as Piyalepasa 1980, scrapped 1999
Fitch	United States Navy	Gleaves	Destroyer	1,630	3 February 1942	decommissioned 1956, sunk as target 1973
Fletcher	United States Navy	Fletcher	Destroyer	2,050	30 June 1942	decommissioned 1 August 1969, scrapped 1972
Fleuret	French Navy; Regia Marina	Le Hardi	Destroyer	1,772	10 May 1940	renamed as Foudroyant 1 April 1941, scuttled 27 November 1942, refloated as FR36 by Italy 20 May 1943, scrapped 1957
Floyd B. Parks	United States Navy	Gearing	Destroyer	2,616	31 July 1945	decommissioned 1973, scrapped 1974
Flusser	United States Navy	Mahan	Destroyer	1,450	1 October 1936	scrapped 1948
Folgore	Regia Marina	Folgore	Destroyer	1,220	1 July 1932	sunk 2 December 1942
Foote	United States Navy	Fletcher	Destroyer	2,050	22 December 1942	decommissioned 1946, scrapped 1974
Forbin	French Navy; Free French Naval Forces	L'Adroit	Destroyer	1,360	1 May 1930	stricken 10 December 1952
Foresight	Royal Navy	F	Destroyer	1,405	15 May 1935	sunk 13 August 1942
Forrest	United States Navy	Gleaves	Destroyer	1,630	13 January 1942	scrapped 1946
Forrest Royal	United States Navy	Gearing	Destroyer	2,616	29 June 1946	to Turkey as Adatepe 1971, scrapped 1994
Forester	Royal Navy	F	Destroyer	1,405	29 March 1935	paid off September 1945
Fortune	Royal Navy; Royal Canadian Navy	F	Destroyer	1,405	27 April 1935	to Canada as Saskatchewan 31 May 1943, mined 21 June 1944
Foudroyant	French Navy	L'Adroit	Destroyer	1,360	10 October 1930	sunk 1 June 1940
Fougueux	French Navy	L'Adroit	Destroyer	1,360	15 June 1930	sunk 8 November 1942
Foxhound	Royal Navy; Royal Canadian Navy	F	Destroyer	1,405	6 June 1935	to RCN 8 February 1944 as Qu'Appelle, paid off 26 May 1946
Fox	United States Navy	Clemson	Destroyer	1,215	17 May 1920	sold for scrap 12 November 1946
Francesco Crispi	Regia Marina	Sella	Destroyer	950	29 April 1927	captured by Germany 9 September 1943 as TA15, sunk by aircraft 8 March 1944
Francesco Nullo	Regia Marina	Sauro	Destroyer	1,041	15 April 1927	destroyed by aircraft 21 October 1940
Frank E. Evans	United States Navy	Allen M. Sumner	Destroyer	2,200	3 February 1945	decommissioned 1949, sunk as target 1969
Frank Knox	United States Navy	Gearing	Destroyer	2,616	11 December 1944	to Greece as Themistoklis 1971, sunk as target 2001
Frankford	United States Navy	Gleaves	Destroyer	1,630	31 March 1943	decommissioned 1946, sunk as target 1973
Franks	United States Navy	Fletcher	Destroyer	2,050	30 July 1943	decommissioned 1946, sold for scrap 1973
Fraser	Royal Canadian Navy	River	Destroyer	1,375	17 February 1937	sunk in a collision 25 June 1940
Frazier	United States Navy	Benson	Destroyer	1,620	30 July 1942	decommissioned 1946, scrapped 1972
Freccia	Regia Marina	Dardo	Destroyer	1,206	21 October 1931	sunk by aircraft 8 August 1943
Fred T. Berry	United States Navy	Gearing	Destroyer	2,616	12 May 1945	decommissioned 1970, sunk as artificial reef 1972
Frondeur	French Navy	L'Adroit	Destroyer	1,360	20 October 1931	sunk 8 November 1942
Frunze	Soviet Navy	Derzky	Destroyer	1,100	18 April 1915	sunk by aircraft 21 September 1941
Fubuki	Imperial Japanese Navy	Fubuki	Destroyer	1,750	10 August 1928	sunk 11 October 1942
Fuciliere	Regia Marina	Soldati	Destroyer	1,850	10 January 1939	to Soviet Union as Lyogky 31 January 1950, retired 1960
Fulmine	Regia Marina	Folgore	Destroyer	1,220	14 September 1932	sunk 9 November 1941
Fullam	United States Navy	Fletcher	Destroyer	2,050	2 March 1943	decommissioned 1947, sunk as target 1962
Fuji	Imperial Japanese Navy	Momi	Destroyer	850	31 May 1921	converted to patrol boat Dai-36-Gō shōkaitei 1 April 1940, scrapped 10 August 1946
Fujinami	Imperial Japanese Navy	Yūgumo	Destroyer	2,077	31 July 1943	sunk 10 January 1945
Fumizuki	Imperial Japanese Navy	Mutsuki	Destroyer	1,315	3 July 1926	sunk 18 February 1944
Furse	United States Navy	Gearing	Destroyer	2,616	10 July 1945	to Spain as Gravina 1972, scrapped 1991
Fury	Royal Navy	F	Destroyer	1,405	10 September 1934	mined 21 June 1944, not repaired
Fuyutsuki	Imperial Japanese Navy	Akizuki	Destroyer	2,700	25 May 1944	scrapped and converted to breakwater 1948
Gabbard	Royal Navy	Battle	Destroyer	2,325	10 December 1946	paid off 1953
Gallant	Royal Navy	G	Destroyer	1,350	25 February 1936	sunk as a blockship September 1943, scrapped 1953
Gainard	United States Navy	Allen M. Sumner	Destroyer	2,200	23 November 1944	decommissioned 1971, sold for scrap 1974
Gamble	United States Navy	Wickes	Destroyer minelayer	1,190	29 November 1918	scuttled 16 July 1945
Gansevoort	United States Navy	Benson	Destroyer	1,620	25 August 1942	decommissioned 1946, sunk as target 1972
Garland	Royal Navy; Polish Navy	G	Destroyer	1,350	3 March 1936	to Poland 3 May 1940, paid off 24 September 1946
Garm	Royal Norwegian Navy	Draug	Destroyer	578	6 July 1914	sunk 26 April 1940
Gatling	United States Navy	Fletcher	Destroyer	2,050	19 August 1943	decommissioned 1960, sold for scrap 1977
Gävle	Swedish Navy	Göteborg	Destroyer	1,020	3 June 1941	decommissioned 6 December 1968, used as generator at the Oskarshamn Nuclear Power Plant, scrapped 1972
Gearing	United States Navy	Gearing	Destroyer	2,616	3 May 1945	decommissioned 1973, scrapped 1974
Geniere	Regia Marina	Soldati	Destroyer	1,850	14 December 1938	sunk by aircraft 1 March 1943
George E. Badger	United States Navy	Clemson	Destroyer	1,215	28 July 1920	scrapped 3 June 1946
George K. MacKenzie	United States Navy	Gearing	Destroyer	2,616	13 July 1945	decommissioned 1976, sunk as target 1976
Georgetown	Royal Navy; Royal Canadian Navy; Soviet Navy	Town	Destroyer	1,200	23 September 1940	to Canada Sept 1942, to USSR as Doblestny 10 August 1944
Gerfaut	French Navy	Aigle	Destroyer	2,402	30 January 1932	scuttled 27 November 1942, refloated 1 June 1943, sunk 7 March 1944, scrapped 1948
Gherardi	United States Navy	Gleaves	Destroyer	1,630	15 September 1942	decommissioned 1955, sunk as target 1973
Gillespie	United States Navy	Benson	Destroyer	1,620	18 September 1942	decommissioned 1946, sunk as target 1973
Gillis	United States Navy	Clemson	Destroyer	1,215	24 September 1919	sold for scrap 29 January 1946
Gilmer	United States Navy	Clemson	Destroyer	1,215	30 April 1920	sold for scrap 3 December 1946
Giosuè Carducci	Regia Marina	Oriani	Destroyer	1,750	1 November 1937	Sunk 28 March 1941
Giovanni da Verrazzano	Regia Marina	Navigatori	Destroyer	1,900	25 September 1930	sunk 19 August 1942
Gipsy	Royal Navy	G	Destroyer	1,350	22 February 1936	sunk 21 November 1939
Gleaves	United States Navy	Gleaves	Destroyer	1,630	14 June 1940	Sold 29 June 1972 and broken up for scrap
Glennon (DD-620)	United States Navy	Gleaves	Destroyer	1,630	8 October 1942	sunk 10 June 1944
Glennon (DD-840)	United States Navy	Gearing	Destroyer	2,616	4 October 1945	decommissioned 1976, sunk as target 1981
Glowworm	Royal Navy	G	Destroyer	1,350	22 January 1936	sunk 8 April 1940
Gnevny	Soviet Navy	Gnevny	Destroyer	1,587	23 December 1938	sunk 26 June 1941
Goff	United States Navy	Clemson	Destroyer	1,215	19 January 1921	sold for scrap 30 November 1945
Goldsborough	United States Navy	Clemson	Destroyer	1,215	26 January 1920	decommissioned 11 October 1945
Goodrich	United States Navy	Gearing	Destroyer	2,616	24 April 1945	decommissioned 1969, scrapped 1977
Gordy	Soviet Navy	Gnevny	Destroyer	1,587	23 December 1938	sunk 14 November 1941
Göteborg	Swedish Navy	Göteborg	Destroyer	1,020	30 October 1936	decommissioned 15 August 1958, sunk as target 14 August 1962
Grafton	Royal Navy	G	Destroyer	1,350	20 March 1936	scuttled after torpedo attack by U-62 on 29 May 1940
Granatiere	Regia Marina	Soldati	Destroyer	1,850	1 February 1939	scrapped 1958
Gravelines	Royal Navy	Battle	Destroyer	2,325	14 June 1946	paid off March 1953
Gravina	Spanish Navy	Churruca	Destroyer	1,535	September 1936	stricken 1960s
Grayson	United States Navy	Gleaves	Destroyer	1,630	14 February 1941	Decommissioned 1947, scrapped 1974
Grecale	Regia Marina	Maestrale	Destroyer	1,640	15 November 1934	scrapped 1965
Greene	United States Navy	Clemson	Destroyer minesweeper	1,215	9 May 1919	wrecked 9 October 1945, wreck destroyed 11 February 1946
Greenhalgh	Brazilian Navy	Marcílio Dias	Destroyer	1,500	29 November 1943	decommissioned 1966
Greer	United States Navy	Wickes	Destroyer	1,190	31 December 1918	sold for scrap 30 November 1945
Gregory (DD-82)	United States Navy	Wickes	Destroyer	1,190	1 June 1918	sunk 5 September 1942
Gregory (DD-802)	United States Navy	Fletcher	Destroyer	2,050	29 July 1944	decommissioned 1964, sunk as target 1971
Gremyashchy	Soviet Navy	Gnevny	Destroyer	1,587	28 August 1938	scuttled after a nuclear test October 1957
Grenade	Royal Navy	G	Destroyer	1,350	28 March 1936	sunk 29 May 1940
Grenville (H03)	Royal Navy	G	Destroyer flotilla leader	1,478	1 July 1936	sunk 19 January 1940
Grenville (R97)	Royal Navy	U	Destroyer flotilla leader	1,777	27 May 1943	paid off 1974, scrapped 1983
Greyhound	Royal Navy	G	Destroyer	1,350	1 February 1936	sunk 22 May 1941
Gridley	United States Navy	Gridley	Destroyer	1,590	24 June 1937	scrapped 1947
Griffin	Royal Navy; Royal Canadian Navy	G	Destroyer	1,350	6 June 1936	to Canada 1 March 1943 as HMCS Ottawa, paid off May 1945
Grom	Polish Navy	Grom	Destroyer	2,011	11 May 1937	sunk 4 May 1940
Gromky	Soviet Navy	Gnevny	Destroyer	1,587	31 December 1938	sunk after a nuclear test 10 October 1957
Grozny	Soviet Navy	Gnevny	Destroyer	1,587	9 December 1938	scrapped 1960
Grozyashchy	Soviet Navy	Gnevny	Destroyer	1,587	17 September 1939	scrapped 1950s
Guépard	French Navy	Guépard	Destroyer	2,398	13 August 1929	scuttled 27 November 1942, refloated 4 September 1943, sunk March 1944, refloated 1947 and broken up
Guest	United States Navy	Fletcher	Destroyer	2,050	15 December 1942	to Brazil as Para 1959, sunk as target 1983
Gurke	United States Navy	Gearing	Destroyer	2,616	12 May 1945	to Greece as Tombazis 1977, laid up 1998
Gurkha (F20)	Royal Navy	Tribal	Destroyer	1,891	21 October 1938	sunk 9 April 1940
Gurkha (G63)	Royal Navy	L	Destroyer	1,920	18 February 1941	sunk 17 January 1942
Gwin (DD-433)	United States Navy	Gleaves	Destroyer	1,630	15 January 1941	sunk 13 July 1943
Gwin (DM-33)	United States Navy	Robert H. Smith	Destroyer minelayer	2,200	30 September 1944	to Turkey as Muavenet 1971, crippled by friendly fire 1992, scrapped 1993
Gyatt	United States Navy	Gearing	Destroyer	2,616	2 July 1945	decommissioned 1969, sunk as target 1970
Gyller	Royal Norwegian Navy; Kriegsmarine	Sleipner	Destroyer	735	7 July 1938	captured by Germany as Löwe 9 April 1940, returned to Norway May 1945, sold for scrap 1959
Haggard	United States Navy	Fletcher	Destroyer	2,050	31 August 1943	decommissioned 1945, sold for scrap 1946
Hagi (1920)	Imperial Japanese Navy	Momi	Destroyer	850	20 April 1921	converted to patrol boat Dai-33-Gō shōkaitei 1 April 1940, destroyed 23 December 1941
Hagi (1944)	Imperial Japanese Navy	Tachibana	Destroyer	1,288	1 March 1945	to United Kingdom 16 July 1947, scrapped
Hagikaze	Imperial Japanese Navy	Kagerō	Destroyer	2,032	31 March 1941	sunk 7 August 1943
Hai Sui	Republic of China-Nanjing Navy	Chang Feng	Destroyer	384	7 November 1912	returned to Republic of China 1945, stricken July 1947
Hai Wei	Manchukuo Imperial Navy; Imperial Japanese Navy	Momo	Destroyer	835	31 March 1917	returned to Japan as Kaii 6 June 1942, sunk 10 October 1944
Haida	Royal Canadian Navy	Tribal	Destroyer	1,927	30 August 1943	paid off 11 October 1963, preserved as museum ship
Hailey	United States Navy	Fletcher	Destroyer	2,050	30 September 1943	to Brazil as Pernambuco 1961, sunk as target 1982
Hale	United States Navy	Fletcher	Destroyer	2,050	15 June 1943	to Colombia as Antioquia 1961, sold for scrap 1973
Halford	United States Navy	Fletcher	Destroyer	2,050	10 April 1943	decommissioned 15 May 1946; scrapped 2 April 1970
Hall	United States Navy	Fletcher	Destroyer	2,050	6 July 1943	to Greece as Lonchi 1960, sold for scrap 1997
Halligan	United States Navy	Fletcher	Destroyer	2,050	19 August 1943	lost 26 March 1945
Halsey Powell	United States Navy	Fletcher	Destroyer	2,050	25 October 1943	to South Korea as Seoul 1968, sold for scrap 1982
Hälsingborg	Swedish Navy	Visby	Destroyer	1,135	30 November 1943	decommissioned 1 July 1978, scrapped 1979
Hamakaze	Imperial Japanese Navy	Kagerō	Destroyer	2,032	30 June 1941	sunk 7 April 1945
Hamanami	Imperial Japanese Navy	Yūgumo	Destroyer	2,077	15 October 1943	sunk 11 November 1944
Hambleton	United States Navy	Gleaves	Destroyer	1,630	22 December 1941	decommissioned 1955, scrapped 1972
Hamilton	United States Navy	Wickes	Destroyer minesweeper	1,190	7 November 1919	sold for scrap 21 November 1946
Hamilton	Royal Navy; Royal Canadian Navy	Town	Destroyer	1,060	23 September 1940	to Canada June 1941
Hammann	United States Navy	Sims	Destroyer	1,570	11 August 1939	sunk 6 June 1942
Hamner	United States Navy	Gearing	Destroyer	2,616	12 July 1946	to Taiwan as Yun Yang 1980, sunk as target 2005
Hanazuki	Imperial Japanese Navy	Akizuki	Destroyer	2,700	26 December 1944	to United States as DD-934 29 August 1947, sunk as target 3 February 1948
Hank	United States Navy	Allen M. Sumner	Destroyer	2,200	28 August 1944	to Argentina as Segui 1972, scrapped 1983
Hanson	United States Navy	Gearing	Destroyer	2,616	11 May 1945	to Taiwan as Liao Yang 1973, sunk as target 2006
Haraden	United States Navy	Fletcher	Destroyer	2,050	16 September 1943	decommissioned 1946, sunk as target 1973
Harding	United States Navy	Gleaves	Destroyer	1,630	25 May 1943	scrapped 1947
Hardy (H87)	Royal Navy	H	Destroyer flotilla leader	1,455	11 December 1936	beached and capsized under attack 10 April 1940
Hardy (R08)	Royal Navy	V	Destroyer flotilla leader	1,777	14 August 1943	sunk 30 January 1944
Harlan R. Dickson	United States Navy	Allen M. Sumner	Destroyer	2,200	17 February 1945	decommissioned 1972, sold for scrap 1973
Harold J. Ellison	United States Navy	Gearing	Destroyer	2,616	23 June 1945	to Pakistan as Shah Jahan 1983, sunk as target 1994
Harrison	United States Navy	Fletcher	Destroyer	2,050	25 January 1943	to Mexico as Cuauhtémoc 1970, decommissioned 1982 and scrapped
Harry E. Hubbard	United States Navy	Allen M. Sumner	Destroyer	2,200	22 July 1944	decommissioned 1947, sold for scrap 1970
Harry F. Bauer	United States Navy	Robert H. Smith	Destroyer minelayer	2,200	22 September 1944	decommissioned 1956, sold for scrap 1974
Hart	United States Navy	Fletcher	Destroyer	2,050	4 November 1944	decommissioned 1946, sold for scrap 1973
Harusame	Imperial Japanese Navy	Shiratsuyu	Destroyer	1,685	26 August 1937	sunk 8 June 1944
Harutsuki	Imperial Japanese Navy	Akizuki	Destroyer	2,700	28 December 1944	to Soviet Union as Vnezapny 28 August 1947, struck 4 June 1969 and scrapped
Harvester	Royal Navy	Havant	Destroyer	1,350	23 May 1940	sunk 11 March 1943
Harwood	United States Navy	Gearing	Destroyer	2,616	28 September 1945	to Turkey as Kocatepe 1971, sunk by friendly fire 1974
Hasty	Royal Navy	H	Destroyer	1,350	11 November 1936	sunk 15 June 1942.
Hasu	Imperial Japanese Navy	Momi	Destroyer	850	31 July 1922	decommissioned 12 October 1945, scuttled as breakwater 1946
Hatfield	United States Navy	Clemson	Destroyer	1,190	16 April 1920	sold for scrap 9 May 1947
Hatsuharu	Imperial Japanese Navy	Hatsuharu	Destroyer	1,802	30 September 1933	sunk 13 November 1944
Hatsukaze	Imperial Japanese Navy	Kagerō	Destroyer	2,032	15 February 1940	sunk 2 November 1943
Hatsushimo	Imperial Japanese Navy	Hatsuharu	Destroyer	1,802	27 September 1934	damaged by mine and run aground 30 July 1945, scrapped 1948–1949
Hatsuume	Imperial Japanese Navy	Tachibana	Destroyer	1,288	18 June 1945	to Republic of China as Xin Yang 6 July 1947, scrapped 1960s
Hatsuyuki	Imperial Japanese Navy	Fubuki	Destroyer	1,750	30 March 1929	sunk 17 July 1943
Hatsuzakura	Imperial Japanese Navy	Tachibana	Destroyer	1,288	18 May 1945	to USSR as Vyrazitelny 2 October 1947, scrapped 19 February 1959
Hatsuzuki	Imperial Japanese Navy	Akizuki	Destroyer	2,700	29 December 1942	sunk 25 October 1944
Havant	Royal Navy	Havant	Destroyer	1,350	19 December 1939	scuttled 1 June 1940
Havelock	Royal Navy	Havant	Destroyer	1,350	10 February 1940	scrapped October 1946
Havock	Royal Navy	H	Destroyer	1,350	16 January 1937	ran aground 6 April 1942
Hawkins	United States Navy	Gearing	Destroyer	2,616	10 February 1945	to Taiwan as Tzi Yang 1979, scrapped late 1990s, superstructure preserved
Hayanami	Imperial Japanese Navy	Yūgumo	Destroyer	2,077	31 July 1943	sunk 7 June 1944
Hayashimo	Imperial Japanese Navy	Yūgumo	Destroyer	2,077	20 February 1944	sunk 26 October 1944
Hayashio	Imperial Japanese Navy	Kagerō	Destroyer	2,032	31 August 1940	sunk 24 November 1942
Haynsworth	United States Navy	Allen M. Sumner	Destroyer	2,200	22 June 1944	to China as Yue Yang 1970, sunk as artificial reef 2001
Hazelwood	United States Navy	Fletcher	Destroyer	2,050	18 June 1943	decommissioned 1965, sold for scrap 1976
Healy	United States Navy	Fletcher	Destroyer	2,050	3 September 1943	decommissioned 1958, sold for scrap 1976
Heermann	United States Navy	Fletcher	Destroyer	2,050	6 July 1943	transfer to Argentina 1961, scrapped 1982
Helm	United States Navy	Bagley	Destroyer	1,500	16 October 1937	scrapped 1947
Henderson	United States Navy	Gearing	Destroyer	2,616	4 August 1945	to Pakistan as Tughril 1980, renamed as Nazim 1998, decommissioned 2001
Henley (DD-391)	United States Navy	Bagley	Destroyer	1,500	14 August 1937	sunk 3 October 1943
Henley (DD-762)	United States Navy	Allen M. Sumner	Destroyer	2,200	8 October 1946	decommissioned 1950, sold for scrap 1974
Henry A. Wiley	United States Navy	Robert H. Smith	Destroyer minelayer	2,200	31 August 1944	decommissioned 1947, sold for scrap 1972
Henry W. Tucker	United States Navy	Gearing	Destroyer	2,616	12 March 1945	to Brazil as Marcilio Dias 1973, sunk as target 1996
Herbert	United States Navy	Wickes	Destroyer	1,190	21 November 1919	sold for scrap 23 May 1946
Herbert J. Thomas	United States Navy	Gearing	Destroyer	2,616	29 May 1945	to Taiwan as Han Yang 1974, decommissioned 1999 and sunk as artificial reef
Hereward	Royal Navy	H	Destroyer	1,350	9 December 1936	sunk 29 May 1941
Herndon	United States Navy	Gleaves	Destroyer	1,630	20 December 1942	decommissioned 1946, sunk as target 1973
Hero	Royal Navy; Royal Canadian Navy	H	Destroyer	1,350	23 October 1936	to Canada 15 November 1943 as HMCS Chaudièrepaid off 19 March 1946
Hesperus	Royal Navy	Havant	Destroyer	1,350	22 January 1940	scrapped November 1946
Heywood L. Edwards	United States Navy	Fletcher	Destroyer	2,050	26 January 1944	to Japan as Ariake 1959, scrapped 1976
Hibiki	Imperial Japanese Navy	Akatsuki	Destroyer	1,750	31 March 1933	to USSR as Verny 5 April 1947, sunk as target 1970s
Hickox	United States Navy	Fletcher	Destroyer	2,050	10 September 1943	to South Korea as Busan 1968, scrapped 1989
Higbee	United States Navy	Gearing	Destroyer	2,616	27 January 1945	decommissioned 1979, sunk as target 1986
Highlander	Royal Navy	Havant	Destroyer	1,350	18 March 1940	scrapped May 1946
Hilary P. Jones	United States Navy	Benson	Destroyer	1,620	6 September 1940	to Taiwan 1954, scrapped 1974
Hinoki (1916)	Imperial Japanese Navy	Momo	Destroyer	835	31 March 1917	decommissioned 1 April 1940, scrapped
Hinoki (1944)	Imperial Japanese Navy	Matsu	Destroyer	1,262	30 September 1944	sunk 7 January 1945
Hishi	Imperial Japanese Navy	Momi	Destroyer	850	23 March 1922	converted to patrol boat Dai-37-Gō shōkaitei 1 April 1940, sunk 24 January 1942
Hobby	United States Navy	Benson	Destroyer	1,620	18 November 1942	decommissioned 1946, sunk as target 1972
Hobson	United States Navy	Gleaves	Destroyer	1,630	22 January 1942	sunk in collision 1952
Hoel	United States Navy	Fletcher	Destroyer	2,100	19 July 1943	sunk 25 October 1944, Battle off Samar
Hogan	United States Navy	Wickes	Destroyer minesweeper	1,190	1 October 1919	sunk as target 8 November 1945
Hogue	Royal Navy	Battle	Destroyer	2,325	24 July 1945	constructive loss 25 August 1962
Holder	United States Navy	Gearing	Destroyer	2,616	18 May 1946	to Ecuador as Presidente Eloy Alfaro 1977, scrapped 1991
Hollister	United States Navy	Gearing	Destroyer	2,616	29 March 1946	to Taiwan as Shao Yang 1983, sunk as artificial reef 2006
Hopewell	United States Navy	Fletcher	Destroyer	2,050	30 September 1943	decommissioned 1970, sunk as target 1972
Hopkins	United States Navy	Clemson	Destroyer minesweeper	1,190	21 March 1921	sold for scrap 8 November 1946
Hostile	Royal Navy	H	Destroyer	1,350	10 September 1936	scuttled 23 August 1940
Hotspur	Royal Navy	H	Destroyer	1,350	29 December 1936	to Dominican Republic after war
Hovey	United States Navy	Clemson	Destroyer minesweeper	1,190	24 September 1919	sunk 7 January 1945
Howard	United States Navy	Wickes	Destroyer minesweeper	1,190	29 January 1920	sold for scrap 14 June 1946
Howorth	United States Navy	Fletcher	Destroyer	2,050	3 April 1944	decommissioned 1946, sunk as target 1962
Hudson	United States Navy	Fletcher	Destroyer	2,050	13 April 1943	decommissioned 1946, sold for scrap 1973
Huesca	Spanish Navy	Alessandro Poerio	Destroyer	845	25 May 1915	decommissioned and scrapped 1953
Hugh Purvis	United States Navy	Allen M. Sumner	Destroyer	2,200	1 March 1945	to Turkey as Zafer 1972, scrapped 1994
Hugh W. Hadley	United States Navy	Allen M. Sumner	Destroyer	2,200	25 November 1944	decommissioned 1945, sold for scrap 1947
Hughes	United States Navy	Sims	Destroyer	1,570	21 September 1939	scuttled after A-bomb test 1948
Hugin	Swedish Navy	Hugin	Destroyer	350	20 June 1911	decommissioned 13 June 1947, sold for scrap 1949
Hulbert	United States Navy	Clemson	Destroyer	1,190	27 October 1920	sold for scrap 31 October 1946
Hull	United States Navy	Farragut	Destroyer	1,365	11 January 1935	foundered in typhoon 18 December 1944
Humphreys	United States Navy	Clemson	Destroyer	1,190	21 July 1920	sold for scrap 26 August 1946
Hunt	United States Navy	Fletcher	Destroyer	2,050	22 September 1943	decommissioned 1963, sold for scrap 1975
Hunter	Royal Navy	H	Destroyer	1,350	30 September 1936	sunk 10 April 1940
Huron	Royal Canadian Navy	Tribal	Destroyer	1,927	28 July 1943	scrapped 1965
Hurricane	Royal Navy	Havant	Destroyer	1,350	21 June 1940	sunk 24 December 1943
Hutchins	United States Navy	Fletcher	Destroyer	2,050	17 November 1942	decommissioned 1945, sold for scrap 1948
Hyatt	Chilean Navy	Serrano	Destroyer	1,090	15 April 1929	stricken 30 January 1963
Hydra	Royal Hellenic Navy	Kountouriotis	Destroyer	1,389	1 November 1932	sunk 22 April 1941
Hyman	United States Navy	Allen M. Sumner	Destroyer	2,200	16 June 1944	decommissioned 1969, sold for scrap 1970
Hyperion	Royal Navy	H	Destroyer	1,350	3 December 1936	sunk 22 December 1940
Icarus	Royal Navy	I	Destroyer	1,370	3 May 1937	scrapped 29 October 1946
Ierax	Royal Hellenic Navy	Aetos	Destroyer	880	19 October 1912	Decommissioned 1946
Ikazuchi	Imperial Japanese Navy	Akatsuki	Destroyer	1,750	15 August 1932	sunk 13 April 1944
Ilex	Royal Navy	I	Destroyer	1,370	7 July 1937	scrapped 1948.
Imogen	Royal Navy	I	Destroyer	1,370	2 June 1937	sunk in collision 16 July 1940
Imperial	Royal Navy	I	Destroyer	1,370	30 June 1937	scuttled 29 May 1941
Impulsive	Royal Navy	I	Destroyer	1,370	29 January 1938	scrapped 22 January 1946
Inazuma	Imperial Japanese Navy	Akatsuki	Destroyer	1,750	15 November 1932	sunk 14 May 1944
Inconstant	Royal Navy	I	Destroyer	1,370	24 January 1942	returned to Turkey as Muavenet 9 March 1946, scrapped 1960
Inglefield	Royal Navy	I	Destroyer flotilla leader	1,544	25 June 1937	sunk 25 February 1944
Ingersoll	United States Navy	Fletcher	Destroyer	2,050	31 August 1943	decommissioned 1970, sunk as target 1974
Ingraham (DD-444)	United States Navy	Gleaves	Destroyer	1,630	19 July 1941	sunk 22 August 1942
Ingraham (DD-694)	United States Navy	Allen M. Sumner	Destroyer	2,200	10 March 1944	to Greece as Miaoulis 1971, sunk as target 2001
Intrepid	Royal Navy	I	Destroyer	1,370	29 July 1937	sunk 26 September 1943
Iroquois	Royal Canadian Navy	Tribal	Destroyer	1,927	30 November 1942	paid off 24 October 1962, scrapped 1966
Irwin	United States Navy	Fletcher	Destroyer	2,050	14 February 1944	to Brazil as Santa Catarina 1968, sunk as target 1990
Isaac Sweers	Royal Netherlands Navy	Gerard Callenburgh	Destroyer	1,604	29 May 1941	sunk 13 November 1942
Isherwood	United States Navy	Fletcher	Destroyer	2,050	12 April 1943	to Peru as Almirante Guise 1961, scrapped 1981
Isis	Royal Navy	I	Destroyer	1,370	2 June 1937	sunk 20 July 1944.
Isokaze	Imperial Japanese Navy	Kagerō	Destroyer	2,032	30 November 1940	scuttled 7 April 1945
Isonami	Imperial Japanese Navy	Fubuki	Destroyer	1,750	30 June 1928	sunk 9 April 1943
Ithuriel	Royal Navy	I	Destroyer	1,370	3 March 1942	constructive loss 28 November 1942, scrapped 25 August 1945
Ivanhoe	Royal Navy	I	Destroyer	1,370	24 August 1937	sunk 1 September 1940
Izard	United States Navy	Fletcher	Destroyer	2,050	15 May 1943	decommissioned 1946, sold for scrap 1970
J. Fred Talbott	United States Navy	Wickes	Destroyer	1,190	30 June 1919	sold for scrap 22 December 1946
J. William Ditter	United States Navy	Robert H. Smith	Destroyer minelayer	2,200	28 October 1944	decommissioned 1945, sold for scrap 1946
Jackal	Royal Navy	J	Destroyer	1,690	31 March 1939	scuttled 11 May 1942
Jacob Jones	United States Navy	Wickes	Destroyer	1,190	20 October 1919	sunk 28 February 1942
Jaguar	French Navy	Chacal	Destroyer	2,092	24 July 1926	beached and wrecked 23 May 1940
Jaguar	Royal Navy	J	Destroyer	1,690	12 September 1939	sunk 26 March 1942 by U-652
Janus	Royal Navy	J	Destroyer	1,690	5 August 1939	sunk 23 January 1944
James C. Owens	United States Navy	Allen M. Sumner	Destroyer	2,200	17 February 1945	to Brazil as Sergipe 1973, scrapped 1995
James E. Kyes	United States Navy	Gearing	Destroyer	2,616	8 February 1946	to Taiwan as Chien Yang 1973, decommissioned 2004, scrapped 2013
Jarvis (DD-393)	United States Navy	Bagley	Destroyer	1,500	27 October 1937	sunk 9 August 1942
Jarvis (DD-799)	United States Navy	Fletcher	Destroyer	2,050	3 June 1944	to Spain as Alcalá Galiano 1960, scrapped 1988
Javelin	Royal Navy	J	Destroyer	1,690	10 June 1939	scrapped 1949
Jeffers	United States Navy	Gleaves	Destroyer	1,630	5 November 1942	decommissioned 1955, scrapped 1973
Jenkins	United States Navy	Fletcher	Destroyer	2,050	31 July 1942	decommissioned 1969, sold for scrap 1971
Jersey	Royal Navy	J	Destroyer	1,690	28 April 1939	sank 4 May 1941
Jervis	Royal Navy	J	Destroyer flotilla leader	1,690	12 May 1939	scrapped 1949
John A. Bole	United States Navy	Allen M. Sumner	Destroyer	2,200	3 March 1945	to Taiwan 6 May 1974, scrapped for spare parts
John D. Edwards	United States Navy	Clemson	Destroyer	1,215	6 April 1920	sold for scrap 30 November 1945
John D. Ford	United States Navy	Clemson	Destroyer	1,190	30 December 1920	sold for scrap 5 October 1947
John D. Henley	United States Navy	Fletcher	Destroyer	2,050	2 February 1944	decommissioned 1946, sold for scrap 1970
John Hood	United States Navy	Fletcher	Destroyer	2,050	7 June 1944	decommissioned 1964, sold for scrap 1976
John Rodgers	United States Navy	Fletcher	Destroyer	2,050	9 February 1943	to Mexico as Cuitláhuac 1970, scrapped 2011
John R. Craig	United States Navy	Gearing	Destroyer	2,616	20 August 1945	decommissioned 1979, sunk as target 1980
John R. Pierce	United States Navy	Allen M. Sumner	Destroyer	2,200	30 December 1944	decommissioned 1947, sold for scrap 1974
John W. Thomason	United States Navy	Allen M. Sumner	Destroyer	2,200	11 October 1945	to Taiwan as Nan Yang 1974, sunk as target 2006
John W. Weeks	United States Navy	Allen M. Sumner	Destroyer	2,200	21 July 1944	decommissioned 1950, sunk as target 1970
Johnston (DD-557)	United States Navy	Fletcher	Destroyer	2,050	27 October 1943	sunk 25 October 1944 during Battle off Samar
Johnston (DD-821)	United States Navy	Gearing	Destroyer	2,616	23 August 1946	to Taiwan as Chen Yang 1981, decommissioned 2003, sunk as target 2006
Jorge Juan	Spanish Navy	Churruca	Destroyer	1,535	1937	stricken 1959
José Luis Díez	Spanish Navy	Churruca	Destroyer	1,620	1929	scrapped 1965
Joseph P. Kennedy Jr.	United States Navy	Gearing	Destroyer	2,616	15 December 1945	decommissioned 1973, preserved as museum ship
Jouett	United States Navy	Somers	Destroyer	1,850	25 January 1939	scrapped 1946
Juan De Garray	Argentine Navy	Cervantes	Destroyer	1,522	3 September 1927	scrapped 25 March 1960
Jujuy	Argentine Navy	Catamarca	Destroyer	1,010	15 April 1912	Sold 10 January 1957
Juno	Royal Navy	J	Destroyer	1,690	25 August 1939	sunk 21 May 1941
Jupiter	Royal Navy	J	Destroyer	1,690	25 June 1939	sank 28 February 1942
Kaba	Imperial Japanese Navy	Tachibana	Destroyer	1,288	29 May 1945	to United States 4 August 1947, scrapped 1 March 1948
Kaede	Imperial Japanese Navy	Matsu	Destroyer	1,262	30 October 1944	to Republic of China as Heng Yang 6 July 1947, scrapped 1962
Kagerō	Imperial Japanese Navy	Kagerō	Destroyer	2,032	6 November 1939	sunk 8 May 1943
Kaki (1919)	Imperial Japanese Navy	Momi	Destroyer	850	2 August 1920	decommissioned 1 April 1940, converted to auxiliary ship as Ōsu, scrapped 1948
Kaki (1944)	Imperial Japanese Navy	Tachibana	Destroyer	1,288	5 March 1945	to United States 4 July 1947, sunk as target 19 August 1947
Kalinin	Soviet Navy	Izyaslav	Destroyer	1,350	20 July 1927	sunk 28 August 1941
Kalk	United States Navy	Benson	Destroyer	1,620	17 October 1942	decommissioned 1946, sunk as target 1969
Kalmar	Swedish Navy	Visby	Destroyer	1,135	3 February 1944	decommissioned 1 July 1978, scrapped 1979
Kandahar	Royal Navy	K	Destroyer	1,690	10 October 1939	sunk 20 December 1941
Kane	United States Navy	Clemson	Destroyer	1,215	11 June 1920	sold for scrap 21 June 1946
Karl Liebknecht	Soviet Navy	Orfey	Destroyer	1,260	3 August 1928	scrapped 1950s
Karl Marx	Soviet Navy	Izyaslav	Destroyer	1,350	16 June 1917	sunk 8 August 1941
Karlskrona	Swedish Navy	Göteborg	Destroyer	1,020	12 September 1940	decommissioned 1 July 1974, scrapped 1979
Kashi	Imperial Japanese Navy	Matsu	Destroyer	1,262	30 September 1944	to United States 7 August 1947, scrapped 20 March 1948
Kashmir	Royal Navy	K	Destroyer	1,690	26 October 1939	sunk 23 May 1941
Kasumi	Imperial Japanese Navy	Asashio	Destroyer	2,370	24 June 1939	sunk 7 April 1945
Katsura	Imperial Japanese Navy	Tachibana	Destroyer	1,288	Never commissioned	launched 23 June 1945, converted to breakwater
Kawakaze	Imperial Japanese Navy	Shiratsuyu	Destroyer	1,685	30 April 1937	sunk 6 August 1943
Kaya (1919)	Imperial Japanese Navy	Momi	Destroyer	850	28 March 1920	decommissioned 1 February 1940, scrapped
Kaya (1944)	Imperial Japanese Navy	Matsu	Destroyer	1,262	30 September 1944	to USSR as Volevoy 5 July 1947, scrapped 2 September 1959
Kazagumo	Imperial Japanese Navy	Yūgumo	Destroyer	2,077	28 March 1942	sunk 8 June 1944
Kearny	United States Navy	Gleaves	Destroyer	1,630	13 September 1940	decommissioned 1946, scrapped 1972
Keith	Royal Navy	B	Destroyer	1,350	20 March 1931	sunk 1 June 1940
Kelly	Royal Navy	K	Destroyer flotilla leader	1,690	23 August 1939	sunk 23 May 1941
Kelvin	Royal Navy	K	Destroyer	1,690	27 November 1939	scrapped 1949
Kempenfelt	Royal Navy	W	Destroyer flotilla leader	1,710	25 October 1943	paid off January 1946
Kendrick	United States Navy	Benson	Destroyer	1,620	12 September 1942	decommissioned 1946, sunk as target 1966
Kenneth D. Bailey	United States Navy	Gearing	Destroyer	2,616	31 July 1945	decommissioned 1970, to Iran as spare parts 1975
Kennison	United States Navy	Wickes	Destroyer	1,190	2 April 1919	sold for scrap 18 November 1946
Keppel	Royal Navy	Thornycroft type	Destroyer flotilla leader	1,480	15 April 1925	scrapped 1945
Keppler	United States Navy	Gearing	Destroyer	2,616	23 May 1947	to Turkey as Tınaztepe 1972, scrapped 1984
Kersaint	French Navy	Vauquelin	Destroyer	2,402	20 September 1933	scuttled 27 November 1942, scrapped 1950
Keyaki	Imperial Japanese Navy	Matsu	Destroyer	1,262	15 December 1944	to United States 5 July 1947, sunk as target 29 October 1947
Kharkov	Soviet Navy	Leningrad	Destroyer flotilla leader	2,150	19 November 1938	sunk 6 October 1943
Khartoum	Royal Navy	K	Destroyer	1,690	6 November 1939	sunk 23 June 1940
Kidd	United States Navy	Fletcher	Destroyer	2,050	23 April 1943	decommissioned 1964, museum ship at Baton Rouge, LA
Kiev	Soviet Navy	Kiev	Destroyer flotilla leader	2,350	Never commissioned	launched 12 December 1940, 48.9% complete, construction stopped August 1941, later used as target or scrapped
Kiku	Imperial Japanese Navy	Momi	Destroyer	850	10 December 1920	converted to patrol boat Dai-31-Gō shōkaitei 1 April 1940, sunk 31 March 1944
Kikuzuki	Imperial Japanese Navy	Mutsuki	Destroyer	1,315	20 November 1926	sunk 5 May 1942, salvaged by US 6 October 1943, wreck still present in Nggela Sule Island
Killen	United States Navy	Fletcher	Destroyer	2,050	4 May 1944	decommissioned 1946, sunk as target 1975
Kilty	United States Navy	Wickes	Destroyer	1,190	17 December 1918	sold for scrap 26 August 1946
Kimberley	Royal Navy	K	Destroyer	1,690	21 February 1940	scrapped 1949
Kimberly	United States Navy	Fletcher	Destroyer	2,050	22 May 1943	to Taiwan as An Yang 1967, sunk as target 2003
King	United States Navy	Clemson	Destroyer	1,190	16 December 1920	sold for scrap 29 September 1946
Kingston	Royal Navy	K	Destroyer	1,690	14 September 1939	constructive total loss 11 April 1942
Kipling	Royal Navy	K	Destroyer	1,690	22 December 1939	sunk 11 May 1942
Kiri	Imperial Japanese Navy	Matsu	Destroyer	1,262	14 August 1944	to USSR as Vozrozhdionny 29 July 1947, scrapped 1969
Kisaragi	Imperial Japanese Navy	Mutsuki	Destroyer	1,315	21 December 1925	sunk 11 December 1941
Kishinami	Imperial Japanese Navy	Yūgumo	Destroyer	2,077	3 December 1943	sunk 4 December 1944
Kiyonami	Imperial Japanese Navy	Yūgumo	Destroyer	2,077	25 January 1943	sunk 20 July 1943
Kiyoshimo	Imperial Japanese Navy	Yūgumo	Destroyer	2,077	15 May 1944	sunk 26 December 1944
Klas Horn	Swedish Navy	Klas	Destroyer	1,020	16 September 1932	stricken 15 August 1958
Klas Uggla	Swedish Navy	Klas	Destroyer	1,020	27 September 1932	sunk 17 September 1941
Knapp	United States Navy	Fletcher	Destroyer	2,050	16 September 1943	Decommissioned: 4 March 1957, scrapped 1972
Knight	United States Navy	Gleaves	Destroyer	1,630	23 June 1942	decommissioned 1947, sunk as target 1967
Kocatepe	Turkish Naval Forces	Adatepe	Destroyer	1,250	18 October 1931	decommissioned February 1954
Kortenaer	Royal Netherlands Navy	Admiralen	Destroyer	1,316	3 September 1928	sunk 27 February 1942
Kountouriotis	Royal Hellenic Navy	Kountouriotis	Destroyer	1,389	1 November 1932	decommissioned 1946
Kuroshio	Imperial Japanese Navy	Kagerō	Destroyer	2,032	27 January 1940	sunk 8 May 1943
Kuri	Imperial Japanese Navy	Momi	Destroyer	850	30 April 1920	sunk by mine 8 October 1945
Kusunoki	Imperial Japanese Navy	Tachibana	Destroyer	1,288	28 April 1945	to United Kingdom 16 July 1947, scrapped
Kuwa	Imperial Japanese Navy	Matsu	Destroyer	1,262	15 July 1944	sunk 3 December 1944
L'Adroit	French Navy	L'Adroit	Destroyer	1,360	1 July 1929	sunk 21 May 1940
L'Alcyon	French Navy; Free French Naval Forces	L'Adroit	Destroyer	1,360	15 July 1929	stricken 10 November 1952
L'Audacieux	French Navy; Kriegsmarine	Le Fantasque	Destroyer	2,528	1 August 1935	captured by Germany as ZF5 8 December 1942, sunk 7 May 1943, refloated 14 December 1943, scrapped August 1947
L'Indomptable	French Navy; Kriegsmarine	Le Fantasque	Destroyer	2,528	15 November 1935	scuttled 27 November 1942, captured by Germany as SG9, scrapped 1950
La Palme	French Navy	L'Adroit	Destroyer	1,360	6 February 1928	scuttled 27 November 1942
La Railleuse	French Navy	L'Adroit	Destroyer	1,360	15 March 1928	destroyed 23 March 1940, the hulk sold for scrap April 1942
La Plata	Argentine Navy	La Plata	Destroyer	875	30 March 1912	discarded 10 January 1957
La Rioja	Argentine Navy	Mendoza	Destroyer	1,570	23 July 1929	discarded 30 April 1962
La Vallette	United States Navy	Fletcher	Destroyer	2,050	12 August 1942	decommissioned 1946, sold to Peru as spare parts 1974 and scrapped
Laffey (DD-459)	United States Navy	Benson	Destroyer	1,620	31 March 1942	sunk 13 November 1942
Laffey (DD-724)	United States Navy	Allen M. Sumner	Destroyer	2,200	8 February 1944	decommissioned 1975, memorial at Charleston, SC
Laforey	Royal Navy	L	Destroyer flotilla leader	1,920	26 August 1941	sunk 30 March 1944 by U-223
Lagos	Royal Navy	Battle	Destroyer	2,325	2 November 1945	paid off 1960, scrapped 1967
Lamberton	United States Navy	Wickes	Destroyer minesweeper	1,190	22 August 1918	sold for scrap 9 May 1947
Lamson	United States Navy	Mahan	Destroyer	1,450	21 October 1936	sunk in A-bomb test, 1946
Lampo	Regia Marina	Folgore	Destroyer	1,220	13 August 1932	sunk 30 April 1943
Lancaster	Royal Navy	Town	Destroyer	1,190	24 August 1918	scrapped 1947
Lance	Royal Navy	L	Destroyer	1,920	13 May 1941	constructive loss and scrapped April 1942
Lanciere	Regia Marina	Soldati	Destroyer	1,850	25 March 1939	sunk 23 March 1942
Lang	United States Navy	Benham	Destroyer	1,656	30 March 1939	scrapped 1947
Lansdale	United States Navy	Benson	Destroyer	1,620	17 September 1940	sunk 20 April 1944
Lansdowne	United States Navy	Gleaves	Destroyer	1,630	29 April 1942	to Turkey 1949, scrapped 1973
Lansquenet	French Navy; Regia Marina; Kriegsmarine	Le Hardi	Destroyer	1,772	Never commissioned	scuttled 27 November 1942, refloated as FR34 by Italy 24 April 1943, captured by Germany as TA34 September 1943, scrapped 1958
Lanzerotto Malocello	Regia Marina	Navigatori	Destroyer	1,900	18 January 1930	sunk 24 March 1943
Lardner	United States Navy	Gleaves	Destroyer	1,630	13 May 1942	to Turkey 1949, sunk as target 1982
Laub	United States Navy	Benson	Destroyer	1,620	24 October 1942	decommissioned 1946, scrapped 1975
Lawrence	United States Navy	Clemson	Destroyer	1,190	18 April 1921	sold for scrap 1 October 1946
Laws	United States Navy	Fletcher	Destroyer	2,050	18 November 1943	decommissioned 1964, sold for scrap 1973
Lazaga	Spanish Navy	Alsedo	Destroyer	1,044	1925	stricken 1961
Le Corsaire	French Navy; Regia Marina	Le Hardi	Destroyer	1,772	1 July 1941	renamed as Siroco 1 April 1941, scuttled 27 November 1942, refloated as FR32 by Italy 16 April 1943, scuttled 20 October 1944 and later scrapped
Le Fantasque	French Navy; Free French Naval Forces	Le Fantasque	Destroyer	2,528	15 November 1935	stricken 1953, scrapped 1958
Le Fortuné	French Navy; Free French Naval Forces	L'Adroit	Destroyer	1,360	1 February 1928	scrapped 1950
Le Flibustier	French Navy; Regia Marina	Le Hardi	Destroyer	1,772	Never commissioned	renamed as Bison 1 April 1941, captured 27 November 1942, to Italy as FR35, scrapped 1945
Le Hardi	French Navy; Regia Marina	Le Hardi	Destroyer	1,772	1 December 1939	scuttled 27 November 1942, refloated as FR37 by Italy 12 June 1943, scuttled 20 April 1945
Le Mars	French Navy	L'Adroit	Destroyer	1,360	20 January 1928	scuttled 27 November 1942
Le Malin	French Navy; Free French Naval Forces	Le Fantasque	Destroyer	2,528	20 December 1935	stricken 3 February 1964, scrapped 1977
Le Terrible	French Navy; Free French Naval Forces	Le Fantasque	Destroyer	2,528	15 April 1935	stricken 29 June 1962, scrapped 1963
Le Triomphant	French Navy; Free French Naval Forces	Le Fantasque	Destroyer	2,528	31 December 1935	sold for scrap December 1957
Lea	United States Navy	Wickes	Destroyer	1,190	2 October 1918	sold for scrap 30 November 1946
Leamington	Royal Navy; Royal Canadian Navy; Soviet Navy	Town	Destroyer	1,327	23 October 1940	to Canada October 1942, to USSR as Zhguchy 16 July 1944
Leary (DD-158)	United States Navy	Wickes	Destroyer	1,190	5 December 1919	sunk 24 December 1943
Leary (DD-879)	United States Navy	Gearing	Destroyer	2,616	7 May 1945	to Spain as Langara 1978, scrapped 1994
Leeds	Royal Navy	Town	Destroyer	1,125	12 January 1918	paid off April 1945
Legion	Royal Navy	L	Destroyer	1,920	19 December 1940	sunk 26 March 1942
Legionario	Regia Marina	Soldati	Destroyer	1,850	1 March 1942	to France as Duchaffault 15 August 1948, struck 12 June 1954
Lenin	Soviet Navy	Orfey	Destroyer	1,260	10 July 1916	scuttled 24 June 1941
Leningrad	Soviet Navy	Leningrad	Destroyer flotilla leader	2,150	5 December 1936	sunk as target ship, May 1963
Leon	Royal Hellenic Navy	Aetos	Destroyer	880	19 October 1912	sunk 15 May 1941
Leonard F. Mason	United States Navy	Gearing	Destroyer	2,616	28 June 1946	to Taiwan as Lai Yang 1978, sunk as artificial reef 2003
Leone	Regia Marina	Leone	Destroyer	2,195	1 July 1924	foundered 1 April 1941
Leone Pancaldo	Regia Marina	Navigatori	Destroyer	1,900	30 November 1929	sunk 30 April 1943
Léopard	French Navy; Free French Naval Forces	Chacal	Destroyer	2,092	10 October 1927	ran aground and wrecked 27 May 1943
Lepanto	Spanish Navy	Churruca	Destroyer	1,620	1930	scrapped 1958
Leutze	United States Navy	Fletcher	Destroyer	2,050	4 March 1944	decommissioned 1945, sold for scrap 1947
Lewes	Royal Navy	Town	Destroyer	1,125	23 October 1940	scuttled 25 May 1946
Lewis Hancock	United States Navy	Fletcher	Destroyer	2,050	29 September 1943	to Brazil as Piaui 1967, scrapped 1989
Libeccio	Regia Marina	Maestrale	Destroyer	1,640	23 November 1934	sunk 9 November 1941
Lightning	Royal Navy	L	Destroyer	1,920	28 May 1941	sunk 12 March 1943
Lima	Portuguese Navy	Douro	Destroyer	1,219	12 October 1933	discarded 16 October 1965
Lincoln	Royal Navy; Royal Norwegian Navy; Royal Canadian Navy; Soviet Navy	Town	Destroyer	1,190	20 October 1940	to Norway February 1942, to Canada July 1942 - Dec 1943, to USSR as Druzhny 26 August 1944, returned to UK for scrapping 23 August 1952
Lindsey	United States Navy	Robert H. Smith	Destroyer minelayer	2,200	20 August 1944	decommissioned 1946, sunk as target 1972
Lion	French Navy; Regia Marina	Guépard	Destroyer	2,398	21 January 1931	scuttled 27 November 1942, refloated and repaired, to Italy as FR 21, scuttled 9 September 1943
Litchfield	United States Navy	Clemson	Destroyer	1,215	12 May 1920	sold for scrap 29 March 1946
Little (DD-79)	United States Navy	Wickes	Destroyer	1,190	6 April 1918	sunk 5 September 1942
Little (DD-803)	United States Navy	Fletcher	Destroyer	2,050	19 August 1944	sunk 3 May 1945
Lively	Royal Navy	L	Destroyer	1,920	20 July 1941	sunk 11 May 1942
Livermore	United States Navy	Gleaves	Destroyer	1,630	7 October 1940	Sold 3 March 1961 for scrapping
Ljubljana	Royal Yugoslav Navy; Regia Marina	Beograd	Destroyer	1,190	December 1939	captured by Italy as Lubiana 17 April 1941, sunk or stranded off the Tunisian coast 1 April 1943
Lloyd Thomas	United States Navy	Gearing	Destroyer	2,616	21 March 1947	to Taiwan as Dang Yang 1972, sunk as artificial reef 2002
Lofberg	United States Navy	Allen M. Sumner	Destroyer	2,200	26 April 1945	to Taiwan 6 May 1974, scrapped for spare parts
Long	United States Navy	Clemson	Destroyer minesweeper	1,190	20 October 1919	sunk 6 January 1945
Longshaw	United States Navy	Fletcher	Destroyer	2,050	4 December 1943	ran aground and scuttled 18 May 1945
Lowry	United States Navy	Allen M. Sumner	Destroyer	2,200	23 July 1944	to Brazil as Espirito Santo 1973, scrapped 1996
Lookout	Royal Navy	L	Destroyer	1,920	30 January 1942	paid off 19 October 1945, scrapped February 1948
Loyal	Royal Navy	L	Destroyer	1,920	31 October 1942	constructive loss 12 October 1944, scrapped 1948
Luca Tarigo	Regia Marina	Navigatori	Destroyer	1,900	16 November 1929	sunk 16 April 1941
Luce	United States Navy	Fletcher	Destroyer	2,050	21 June 1943	sunk 4 May 1945
Ludlow	Royal Navy	Town	Destroyer	1,190	26 November 1917	beached 15 July 1945, destroyed as target ship
Ludlow	United States Navy	Gleaves	Destroyer	1,630	5 March 1941	to Greece 1951, scrapped 1972
Lyman K. Swenson	United States Navy	Allen M. Sumner	Destroyer	2,200	2 May 1944	To Taiwan 6 May 1974, scrapped for parts
Lynx	French Navy	Chacal	Destroyer	2,092	10 October 1927	scuttled 27 November 1942
Macdonough	United States Navy	Farragut	Destroyer	1,365	15 March 1935	scrapped 1947
Mackay	Royal Navy	Admiralty type	Destroyer flotilla leader	1,801	1919	paid off 18 February 1947
MacKenzie	United States Navy	Benson	Destroyer	1,620	21 November 1942	decommissioned 1946, sunk as target 1974
MacLeish	United States Navy	Clemson	Destroyer minesweeper	1,190	2 August 1920	sold for scrap 18 December 1946
Macomb	United States Navy	Gleaves	Destroyer	1,630	26 January 1942	to Japan 1954, to Taiwan 1970, scrapped 1980
Maddox (DD-622)	United States Navy	Gleaves	Destroyer	1,630	31 October 1942	sunk 10 July 1943
Maddox (DD-731)	United States Navy	Allen M. Sumner	Destroyer	2,200	2 June 1944	to China as Po Yang 1972, sold for scrap 1985
Madison	United States Navy	Benson	Destroyer	1,620	6 August 1940	decommissioned 1946, sunk as target 1969
Maestrale	Regia Marina	Maestrale	Destroyer	1,640	2 September 1934	scuttled 9 September 1943
Magne	Swedish Navy	Mode	Destroyer	740	26 November 1942	decommissioned 1 January 1966, scrapped 1973
Mahan	United States Navy	Mahan	Destroyer	1,450	18 September 1936	sunk 7 December 1944
Mahratta	Royal Navy	M	Destroyer	1,920	28 July 1942	sunk 25 February 1944
Maillé Brézé	French Navy	Vauquelin	Destroyer	2,402	31 December 1932	lost 30 April 1940, scrapped 15 September 1954
Maikaze	Imperial Japanese Navy	Kagerō	Destroyer	2,032	15 July 1941	sunk 17 February 1944
Maki	Imperial Japanese Navy	Matsu	Destroyer	1,262	10 August 1944	to United Kingdom 14 August 1947, scrapped
Makigumo	Imperial Japanese Navy	Yūgumo	Destroyer	2,077	14 March 1942	sunk 1 February 1943
Makinami	Imperial Japanese Navy	Yūgumo	Destroyer	2,077	8 August 1942	sunk 25 November 1943
Malcolm	Royal Navy	Admiralty type	Destroyer flotilla leader	1,530	14 December 1919	scrapped 25 July 1945
Malmö	Swedish Navy	Göteborg	Destroyer	1,020	15 August 1939	decommissioned 1 February 1965 and scrapped
Mameluk	French Navy	Le Hardi	Destroyer	1,772	17 June 1940	scuttled 27 November 1942, refloated and scrapped 1947
Manley	United States Navy	Caldwell	Destroyer	1,020	15 October 1917	sold for scrap 26 November 1946
Mannert L. Abele	United States Navy	Allen M. Sumner	Destroyer	2,200	4 July 1944	sunk 12 April 1945
Mansfield	United States Navy	Allen M. Sumner	Destroyer	2,200	14 April 1944	to Argentina 4 June 1974, scrapped for spare parts
Mansfield	Royal Navy	Town	Destroyer	1,190	23 October 1940	paid off 22 June 1944
Maori	Royal Navy	Tribal	Destroyer	1,891	5 December 1938	sunk 12 February 1942
Maranhão	Brazilian Navy	Acasta	Destroyer	934	9 December 1922	discarded 13 September 1946
Mărășești	Royal Romanian Navy	Vifor	Destroyer	1,594	15 May 1918	to Soviet Navy as Lyogky 5 September 1944, returned to Romania 12 October 1945, scrapped April 1961
Mărăști	Royal Romanian Navy	Vifor	Destroyer	1,594	15 July 1917	to Soviet Navy as Lovky 5 September 1944, returned to Romania 12 October 1945, scrapped April 1961
Marcílio Dias	Brazilian Navy	Marcílio Dias	Destroyer	1,500	29 November 1943	decommissioned 22 August 1972
Mariz e Barros	Brazilian Navy	Marcílio Dias	Destroyer	1,500	29 November 1943	decommissioned 22 August 1972
Marshall	United States Navy	Fletcher	Destroyer	2,050	16 October 1943	decommissioned 1969, sold for scrap 1970
Massey	United States Navy	Allen M. Sumner	Destroyer	2,200	24 November 1944	decommissioned 1973, sold for scrap 1974
Marne	Royal Navy	M	Destroyer	1,920	2 December 1941	scrapped 1970
Martin	Royal Navy	M	Destroyer	1,920	February 1942	sunk 10 November 1942
Mashona	Royal Navy	Tribal	Destroyer	1,891	30 March 1939	sunk 28 May 1941
Matabele	Royal Navy	Tribal	Destroyer	1,891	25 January 1939	sunk 17 January 1941
Matchless	Royal Navy	M	Destroyer	1,920	12 February 1942	paid off 12 February 1942
Mato Grosso	Brazilian Navy	Pará	Destroyer	560	5 May 1909	decommissioned 1946
Matsu	Imperial Japanese Navy	Matsu	Destroyer	1,262	28 April 1944	sunk 4 August 1944
Maury	United States Navy	Gridley	Destroyer	1,590	5 August 1938	scrapped 1946
Mayo	United States Navy	Benson	Destroyer	1,620	18 September 1940	decommissioned 1946, scrapped 1972
Mayrant	United States Navy	Benham	Destroyer	1,656	13 September 1939	Scuttled off Kwajalein 4 April 1948
McCaffery	United States Navy	Gearing	Destroyer	2,616	26 July 1945	decommissioned 1973, scrapped 1974
McCall	United States Navy	Gridley	Destroyer	1,590	22 June 1938	scrapped 1947
McCalla	United States Navy	Gleaves	Destroyer	1,630	27 May 1942	to Turkey 1949, scrapped 1973
McCook	United States Navy	Gleaves	Destroyer	1,630	15 March 1943	decommissioned 1949, scrapped 1973
McCord	United States Navy	Fletcher	Destroyer	2,050	19 August 1943	decommissioned 1954, sold for scrap 1974
McCormick	United States Navy	Clemson	Destroyer	1,190	30 August 1920	sold for scrap 15 December 1946
McDermut	United States Navy	Fletcher	Destroyer	2,050	19 November 1943	decommissioned 1963, sold for scrap 1966
McDougal	United States Navy	Porter	Destroyer	1,850	23 December 1936	scrapped 1949
McFarland	United States Navy	Clemson	Destroyer	1,190	30 September 1920	sold for scrap 29 October 1946
McGowan	United States Navy	Fletcher	Destroyer	2,050	20 December 1943	to Spain as Jorge Juan 1960, scrapped 1988
McKean (DD-90)	United States Navy	Wickes	Destroyer	1,190	25 February 1919	sunk 17 November 1943
McKean (DD-784)	United States Navy	Gearing	Destroyer	2,616	9 June 1945	to Turkey as spare parts 1982, sunk as target 1987
McKee	United States Navy	Fletcher	Destroyer	2,050	31 March 1943	decommissioned 1946, sold for scrap 1974
McLanahan	United States Navy	Benson	Destroyer	1,620	19 December 1942	decommissioned 1946, scrapped 1974
McNair	United States Navy	Fletcher	Destroyer	2,050	30 December 1943	decommissioned 1963, sold for scrap 1976
Meade	United States Navy	Benson	Destroyer	1,620	22 June 1942	decommissioned 1946, sunk as target 1973
Melilla	Spanish Navy	Vifor	Destroyer	1,594	8 February 1917	scrapped 1950
Melvin	United States Navy	Fletcher	Destroyer	2,050	24 November 1943	Decommissioned 13 January 1954, scrapped 1975
Mendoza	Argentine Navy	Mendoza	Destroyer	1,570	23 July 1929	discarded 30 April 1962
Meredith (DD-434)	United States Navy	Gleaves	Destroyer	1,630	1 March 1941	sunk 15 October 1942
Meredith (DD-726)	United States Navy	Allen M. Sumner	Destroyer	2,200	14 March 1944	sunk 9 June 1944, wreck sold and scrapped 5 August 1960
Meredith (DD-890)	United States Navy	Gearing	Destroyer	2,616	31 December 1945	to Turkey as Savaştepe 1979, scrapped 1995
Mertz	United States Navy	Fletcher	Destroyer	2,050	19 November 1943	decommissioned 1946, sold for scrap 1971
Mervine	United States Navy	Gleaves	Destroyer	1,630	17 June 1942	decommissioned 1949, scrapped 1969
Metcalf	United States Navy	Fletcher	Destroyer	2,050	18 November 1944	decommissioned 1946, sold for scrap 1972
Meteor	Royal Navy	M	Destroyer	1,920	12 August 1942	sold to the Turkish Navy on 29 June 1959, renamed Piyale Pasha
Michishio	Imperial Japanese Navy	Asashio	Destroyer	2,370	31 October 1937	sunk 25 October 1944
Michitsuki	Imperial Japanese Navy	Akizuki	Destroyer	2,700	Never commissioned	16% complete, construction stopped 17 April 1945, scrapped 28 February 1948
Micmac	Royal Canadian Navy	Tribal	Destroyer	1,927	18 September 1945	built and launched during war, paid off 31 March 1964, scrapped 1965
Mikazuki	Imperial Japanese Navy	Mutsuki	Destroyer	1,315	5 May 1927	sunk 29 July 1943
Milan	French Navy	Aigle	Destroyer	2,402	20 April 1934	run aground 8 November 1942, wreck scrapped post-war
Miller	United States Navy	Fletcher	Destroyer	2,050	31 August 1943	decommissioned 1964, sold for scrap 1975
Milne	Royal Navy	M	Destroyer	1,920	6 August 1942	sold to Turkish Navy on 27 April 1959, renamed Alp Arslam
Minazuki	Imperial Japanese Navy	Mutsuki	Destroyer	1,315	22 March 1927	sunk 6 June 1944
Minegumo	Imperial Japanese Navy	Asashio	Destroyer	2,370	4 April 1938	sunk 5 March 1943
Minsk	Soviet Navy	Leningrad	Destroyer flotilla leader	2,350	15 February 1939	sunk 23 September 1941. Salvaged, and sunk as a target, 1958
Misiones	Argentine Navy	Buenos Aires	Destroyer	1,353	5 September 1938	discarded 3 May 1971
Mistral	French Navy; Free French Naval Forces	Bourrasque	Destroyer	1,300	5 April 1927	constructive total loss 10 June 1944
Mitragliere	Regia Marina	Soldati	Destroyer	1,850	1 February 1942	to France as Jurien de la Gravière 8 August 1948, struck 12 June 1954
Mjölner	Swedish Navy	Mode	Destroyer	740	12 November 1942	decommissioned 1 April 1966, sold for scrap 3 November 1969
Moale	United States Navy	Allen M. Sumner	Destroyer	2,200	28 February 1944	decommissioned 1973, sold for scrap
Mochizuki	Imperial Japanese Navy	Mutsuki	Destroyer	1,315	31 October 1927	sunk 24 October 1943
Mode	Swedish Navy	Mode	Destroyer	740	12 November 1942	decommissioned 1 July 1970, scrapped 1978
Moffett	United States Navy	Porter	Destroyer	1,850	28 August 1936	scrapped 1947
Mogador	French Navy	Mogador	Destroyer	2,950	8 April 1939	scuttled 27 November 1942, refloated by Italy 5 April 1943, scrapped 1949
Mohawk	Royal Navy	Tribal	Destroyer	1,891	9 September 1938	sunk 16 April 1941
Momi	Imperial Japanese Navy	Matsu	Destroyer	1,262	3 September 1944	sunk 5 January 1945
Momo (1916)	Imperial Japanese Navy	Momo	Destroyer	835	23 December 1916	decommissioned 1 April 1940, scrapped
Momo (1944)	Imperial Japanese Navy	Matsu	Destroyer	1,262	10 June 1944	sunk 15 December 1944
Monaghan	United States Navy	Farragut	Destroyer	1,365	18 April 1935	foundered in typhoon 18 December 1944
Monssen (DD-436)	United States Navy	Gleaves	Destroyer	1,630	14 March 1941	sunk 13 November 1942
Monssen (DD-798)	United States Navy	Fletcher	Destroyer	2,050	14 February 1944	decommissioned 1957, sold for scrap 1963
Montgomery	United States Navy	Wickes	Destroyer minelayer	1,190	30 September 1918	sold for scrap 11 March 1946
Montgomery	Royal Navy; Royal Canadian Navy	Town	Destroyer	1,247	23 October 1940	to Canada 1942, paid off 22 June 1944
Montrose	Royal Navy	Admiralty type	Destroyer flotilla leader	1,530	14 September 1918	scrapped January 1946
Morris	United States Navy	Sims	Destroyer	1,570	5 March 1940	scrapped 1947
Morrison	United States Navy	Fletcher	Destroyer	2,050	18 December 1943	Sunk by kamikazes, 4 May 1945
Moskva	Soviet Navy	Leningrad	Destroyer flotilla leader	2,150	10 August 1938	sunk 26 June 1941
Mugford	United States Navy	Bagley	Destroyer	1,500	16 August 1937	scuttled after A-bomb test 1948
Mullany	United States Navy	Fletcher	Destroyer	2,050	23 April 1943	to Taiwan as Chin Yang 1971, sunk as artificial reef 2001
Munin (8)	Swedish Navy	Hugin	Destroyer	350	10 January 1913	decommissioned 18 October 1940, sunk as target 1946
Munin (31)	Swedish Navy	Mode	Destroyer	740	3 January 1943	decommissioned 6 December 1968, scrapped 1969
Murakumo	Imperial Japanese Navy	Fubuki	Destroyer	1,750	10 May 1929	sunk 12 October 1942
Murasame	Imperial Japanese Navy	Shiratsuyu	Destroyer	1,685	7 January 1937	sunk 6 March 1943
Murphy	United States Navy	Benson	Destroyer	1,620	25 July 1942	decommissioned 1946, scrapped 1972
Murray	United States Navy	Fletcher	Destroyer	2,050	20 April 1943	decommissioned 1965, sold for scrap 1966
Musketeer	Royal Navy	M	Destroyer	1,920	18 September 1942	scrapped 1955
Mustin	United States Navy	Sims	Destroyer	1,570	15 September 1939	scuttled after A-bomb test 1948
Mutsuki	Imperial Japanese Navy	Mutsuki	Destroyer	1,315	25 March 1926	sunk 25 August 1942
Myles C. Fox	United States Navy	Gearing	Destroyer	2,616	20 March 1945	to Greece as spare parts 1980, scrapped 2003
Myngs	Royal Navy	Z	Destroyer flotilla leader	1,710	23 June 1944	to Egypt as El Qaher 1955, sunk 16 May 1970
Myrmidon	Royal Navy; Polish Navy	M	Destroyer	1,920	18 November 1942	to Poland as ORP Orkan 18 November 1942; sunk 8 October 1943
Naganami	Imperial Japanese Navy	Yūgumo	Destroyer	2,077	30 June 1942	sunk 11 November 1944
Nagatsuki	Imperial Japanese Navy	Mutsuki	Destroyer	1,315	30 April 1927	sunk 6 July 1943
Napier	Royal Australian Navy	N	Destroyer flotilla leader	1,773	28 November 1940	25 October 1945
Nara	Imperial Japanese Navy	Matsu	Destroyer	1,262	26 November 1944	scrapped 1 July 1948
Nashi (1919)	Imperial Japanese Navy	Momi	Destroyer	850	10 December 1919	decommissioned 1 February 1940, scrapped
Nashi (1945)	Imperial Japanese Navy	Tachibana	Destroyer	1,288	15 March 1945	sunk 28 July 1945, salvaged 30 September 1954, to JSDF as JDS Wakaba 31 May 1956, scrapped 1972
Natsugumo	Imperial Japanese Navy	Asashio	Destroyer	2,370	10 February 1938	sunk 15 October 1942
Natsushio	Imperial Japanese Navy	Kagerō	Destroyer	2,032	31 August 1940	sunk 9 February 1942
Natsuzuki	Imperial Japanese Navy	Akizuki	Destroyer	2,700	8 April 1945	ceded to United Kingdom 25 August 1947, scrapped September 1947-March 1948
Nazario Sauro	Regia Marina	Sauro	Destroyer	1,041	23 September 1926	sunk by aircraft 3 April 1941
Nelson	United States Navy	Gleaves	Destroyer	1,630	26 November 1942	decommissioned 1947, scrapped 1969
Nembo	Regia Marina	Turbine	Destroyer	1,070	24 October 1927	sunk 20 July 1940
Nenohi	Imperial Japanese Navy	Hatsuharu	Destroyer	1,802	30 September 1933	sunk 4 July 1942
Nepal	Royal Australian Navy	N	Destroyer	1,773	29 May 1942	paid off 22 October 1945, sold for scrap 1955
Nestor	Royal Australian Navy	N	Destroyer	1,773	12 February 1941	scuttled 15 June 1942
New	United States Navy	Gearing	Destroyer	2,616	5 April 1946	to South Korea as Taejon 1977, scrapped 2001
Newark	Royal Navy	Town	Destroyer	1,060	26 November 1940	scrapped February 1947
Newcomb	United States Navy	Fletcher	Destroyer	2,050	10 November 1943	decommissioned 1945, scrapped 1947
Newman K. Perry	United States Navy	Gearing	Destroyer	2,616	26 July 1945	to South Korea as Gyeonggi 1981, scrapped 1999
Newmarket	Royal Navy	Town	Destroyer	1,060	26 November 1940	scrapped September 1945
Newport	Royal Norwegian Navy	Town	Destroyer	1,190	15 May 1918	June 1942, returned to RN
Nezamozhnik	Soviet Navy	Fidonisy	Destroyer	1,350	7 November 1923	sunk as target ship early 1950s
Niagara	Royal Canadian Navy	Town	Destroyer	1,190	24 September 1940	paid off 27 May 1946
Niblack	United States Navy	Gleaves	Destroyer	1,630	1 August 1940	Sold 16 August 1973 and broken up for scrap
Nicholas	United States Navy	Fletcher	Destroyer	2,050	4 June 1942	decommissioned and sold for scrap 1970
Nicholson	United States Navy	Gleaves	Destroyer	1,630	3 June 1941	to Italy 1951, sunk as target 1975
Nicoloso da Recco	Regia Marina	Navigatori	Destroyer	1,900	20 May 1930	struck 15 July 1954, scrapped
Nicolò Zeno	Regia Marina	Navigatori	Destroyer	1,900	27 May 1930	scuttled 9 September 1943
Nields	United States Navy	Benson	Destroyer	1,620	15 January 1943	decommissioned 1946, scrapped 1972
Niki	Royal Hellenic Navy	Niki	Destroyer	350	30 May 1906	stricken 1945 and scrapped
Niizuki	Imperial Japanese Navy	Akizuki	Destroyer	2,700	31 March 1943	sunk 6 July 1943
Nire (1919)	Imperial Japanese Navy	Momi	Destroyer	850	31 March 1920	decommissioned 1 February 1940, converted to auxiliary ship Dai-1 Tomariura, scrapped 15 August 1948
Nire (1944)	Imperial Japanese Navy	Tachibana	Destroyer	1,288	31 January 1945	scrapped 20 April 1948
Nizam	Royal Australian Navy	N	Destroyer	1,773	19 December 1940	paid off 17 October 1945, sold for scrap 1955
Noa (DD-343)	United States Navy	Clemson	Destroyer	1,190	15 February 1921	sunk 12 September 1944
Noa (DD-841)	United States Navy	Gearing	Destroyer	2,616	2 November 1945	to Spain as Blas de Lezo 1973, scrapped 1991
Nootka	Royal Canadian Navy	Tribal	Destroyer	1,927	9 August 1946	built and launched during war, paid off 6 February 1964, scrapped 1965
Norman	Royal Australian Navy	N	Destroyer	1,773	29 September 1941	paid off October 1945, sold for scrap 1958
Norman Scott	United States Navy	Fletcher	Destroyer	2,050	5 November 1943	decommissioned 1946, sold for scrap 1973
Nordenskjöld	Swedish Navy	Ehrensköld	Destroyer	974	27 September 1927	decommissioned 1 April 1963, scrapped 1964
Norrköping	Swedish Navy	Göteborg	Destroyer	1,020	9 April 1941	decommissioned 1 February 1965, sunk as target 26 May 1977
Norris	United States Navy	Gearing	Destroyer	2,616	9 June 1945	to Turkey as Kocatepe 1974, scrapped 1994
Nowaki	Imperial Japanese Navy	Kagerō	Destroyer	2,032	28 April 1941	sunk 26 October 1944
Nubian	Royal Navy	Tribal	Destroyer	1,891	1 December 1938	scrapped 1949
O'Bannon	United States Navy	Fletcher	Destroyer	2,050	26 June 1942	decommissioned and sold for scrap 1970
O'Brien (DD-415)	United States Navy	Sims	Destroyer	1,570	2 March 1940	sunk 19 October 1942
O'Brien (DD-725)	United States Navy	Allen M. Sumner	Destroyer	2,200	25 February 1944	decommissioned 1947, sunk as target 1972
O'Hare	United States Navy	Gearing	Destroyer	2,616	29 November 1945	to Spain as Méndez Núñez 1973, scrapped 1992
Obdurate	Royal Navy	O	Destroyer	1,540	3 September 1942	sold for scrap 1964
Obedient	Royal Navy	O	Destroyer	1,540	30 October 1942	sold for scrap 1964
Oboro	Imperial Japanese Navy	Ayanami	Destroyer	1,750	31 October 1931	sunk 16 October 1942
Odake	Imperial Japanese Navy	Tachibana	Destroyer	1,288	15 May 1945	to United States 14 July 1947, sunk as target 17 September 1947
Odin	Royal Norwegian Navy; Kriegsmarine	Sleipner	Destroyer	735	24 January 1939	captured by Germany as Panther 9 April 1940, returned to Norway May 1945, sold for scrap 1959
Offa	Royal Navy	O	Destroyer	1,610	20 September 1941	to Pakistan as Tariq 30 November 1949, scrapped 1959
Ognevoy	Soviet Navy	Ognevoy	Destroyer	2,091	22 March 1945	stricken 1960s
Okinami	Imperial Japanese Navy	Yūgumo	Destroyer	2,077	10 December 1943	sunk 13 November 1944
Ōnami	Imperial Japanese Navy	Yūgumo	Destroyer	2,077	29 December 1942	sunk 25 November 1943
Onslaught	Royal Navy	O	Destroyer	1,610	19 June 1942	to Pakistan as Tughril 6 March 1951, scrapped 1977
Onslow	Royal Navy	O	Destroyer flotilla leader	1,610	8 October 1941	to Pakistan 30 September 1948 as Tippu Sultan, decommissioned 1980
Opportune	Royal Navy	O	Destroyer	1,540	14 August 1942	sold for scrap 1955
Opytny	Soviet Navy	prototype	Destroyer	1,707	28 September 1941	scrapped 1955-1956
Orage	French Navy	Bourrasque	Destroyer	1,300	1 September 1926	sunk 23 May 1940
Ordronaux	United States Navy	Benson	Destroyer	1,620	13 February 1943	decommissioned 1947, scrapped 1973
Orella	Chilean Navy	Serrano	Destroyer	1,090	18 December 1928	stricken 29 September 1966
Orleck	United States Navy	Gearing	Destroyer	2,616	15 September 1945	to Turkey as Yücetepe 1982, museum ship 2000
Oribi	Royal Navy	O	Destroyer	1,610	5 July 1941	to Turkey as Gayret 1946, scrapped 1965
Orwell	Royal Navy	O	Destroyer	1,540	17 October 1942	sold for scrap 1965
Ōshio	Imperial Japanese Navy	Asashio	Destroyer	2,370	31 October 1937	sunk 20 February 1943
Osmond Ingram	United States Navy	Clemson	Destroyer	1,215	28 June 1919	sold for scrapping 17 June 1946
Ostro	Regia Marina	Turbine	Destroyer	1,070	9 October 1928	sunk 20 July 1940
Ottawa	Royal Canadian Navy	River	Destroyer	1,375	15 June 1938	sunk 14 September 1942 by U-91
Ouragan	French Navy; Polish Navy; Free French Naval Forces	Bourrasque	Destroyer	1,300	19 January 1927	to Poland 17 July 1940; to Free French 30 April 1941; scrapped 7 April 1949
Overton	United States Navy	Clemson	Destroyer	1,308	30 June 1920	sold for scrap 30 November 1945
Owen	United States Navy	Fletcher	Destroyer	2,050	20 September 1943	decommissioned 1958, sold for scrap 1973
Oyashio	Imperial Japanese Navy	Kagerō	Destroyer	2,032	20 August 1940	sunk 8 May 1943
Ozbourn	United States Navy	Gearing	Destroyer	2,616	5 March 1946	decommissioned and sold for scrap 1975
Pakenham	Royal Navy	P	Destroyer flotilla leader	1,690	4 February 1942	constructive loss, scuttled 16 April 1943
Paladin	Royal Navy	P	Destroyer	1,690	1 December 1941	paid off June 1961, scrapped 1962
Palmer	United States Navy	Wickes	Destroyer minesweeper	1,190	22 November 1918	sunk 7 January 1945
Pantera	Regia Marina	Leone	Destroyer	2,195	28 October 1924	scuttled 3 / 4 April 1941
Panther	Royal Navy	P	Destroyer	1,690	12 December 1941	sunk 9 October 1943
Panthère	French Navy; Regia Marina	Chacal	Destroyer	2,092	10 October 1926	to Italy as FR 22 14 December 1942, scuttled 9 September 1943
Panthir	Royal Hellenic Navy	Aetos	Destroyer	880	19 October 1912	Decommissioned 1946
Paraíba	Brazilian Navy	Pará	Destroyer	560	1909	decommissioned 1944
Parker	United States Navy	Benson	Destroyer	1,620	31 August 1942	decommissioned 1947, scrapped 1973
Parrott	United States Navy	Clemson	Destroyer	1,190	11 May 1920	sold for scrap 5 April 1947
Partridge	Royal Navy	P	Destroyer	1,690	5 July 1941	paid off 1 January 1946
Pathfinder	Royal Navy	P	Destroyer	1,690	13 April 1942	paid off 1945, scrapped 1948
Patterson	United States Navy	Bagley	Destroyer	1,500	22 September 1937	scrapped 1947
Paul Hamilton	United States Navy	Fletcher	Destroyer	2,050	25 October 1943	decommissioned 1945, sold for scrap 1970
Paul Jones	United States Navy	Clemson	Destroyer	1,215	19 April 1921	sold for scrap 5 October 1947
Peary	United States Navy	Clemson	Destroyer	1,190	22 October 1920	sunk 19 February 1942
Penn	Royal Navy	P	Destroyer	1,690	10 February 1942	scrapped 30 October 1950
Perkins (DD-377)	United States Navy	Mahan	Destroyer	1,450	18 September 1936	sunk 29 November 1942
Perkins (DD-877)	United States Navy	Gearing	Destroyer	2,616	4 April 1945	to Argentina as Comodoro Py 1973, sunk as target 1987
Perry (DD-340)	United States Navy	Clemson	Destroyer minesweeper	1,190	7 August 1922	sunk 13 September 1944
Perry (DD-844)	United States Navy	Gearing	Destroyer	2,616	17 January 1946	decommissioned 1973, sold for scrap 1974
Petard	Royal Navy	P	Destroyer	1,690	15 June 1942	scrapped June 1967
Phelps	United States Navy	Porter	Destroyer	1,850	26 February 1936	scrapped 1947
Philip	United States Navy	Fletcher	Destroyer	2,050	21 November 1942	decommissioned 1968, sank in storm 2 February 1972
Philips van Almonde	Royal Netherlands Navy	Gerard Callenburgh	Destroyer	1,604	Never commissioned	construction incomplete, demolished on the slipway 17 May 1940, later scrapped by Germany
Phra Ruang	Royal Thai Navy	R (Thornycroft)	Destroyer	1,035	February 1917	stricken 1959
Piauí	Brazilian Navy	Pará	Destroyer	560	21 December 1908	decommissioned 1944
Picking	United States Navy	Fletcher	Destroyer	2,050	21 September 1943	decommissioned 1969, sunk as target 1997
Piet Hein	Royal Netherlands Navy	Admiralen	Destroyer	1,316	25 January 1928	sunk 19 February 1942
Pillsbury	United States Navy	Clemson	Destroyer	1,190	15 December 1920	sunk 2 March 1942
Piorun	Polish Navy	N	Destroyer	1,773	4 November 1940	to Poland October 1940, to UK August 1946, scrapped 1955
Plunkett	United States Navy	Gleaves	Destroyer	1,630	17 July 1940	to Taiwan 1959, scrapped 1975
Pope	United States Navy	Clemson	Destroyer	1,190	27 October 1920	sunk 1 March 1942
Porcupine	Royal Navy	P	Destroyer	1,690	31 August 1942	torpedoed and split almost in half, declared constructive loss March 1943. Towed to harbour, cut into two, rebuilt, and each half was re-commissioned into the Royal Navy as HMS Pork and HMS Pine. Paid off 31 August 1946.
Porter (DD-356)	United States Navy	Porter	Destroyer	1,850	25 August 1936	sunk 26 October 1942
Porter (DD-800)	United States Navy	Fletcher	Destroyer	2,050	24 June 1944	decommissioned 1953, sold for scrap 1974
Porterfield	United States Navy	Fletcher	Destroyer	2,050	30 October 1943	decommissioned 1969, sunk as target 1982
Power	United States Navy	Gearing	Destroyer	2,616	13 September 1945	to Taiwan as Shen Yang 1977, scrapped 2013
Preble	United States Navy	Clemson	Destroyer minelayer	1,190	19 March 1920	sold for scrap 26 October 1946
Preston (DD-379)	United States Navy	Mahan	Destroyer	1,450	27 October 1936	sunk 14 November 1942
Preston (DD-795)	United States Navy	Fletcher	Destroyer	2,050	20 March 1944	to Turkey as İçel 1969, scrapped 1981
Prichett	United States Navy	Fletcher	Destroyer	2,050	15 January 1944	to Italy as Geniere 1970, scrapped 1975
Pringle	United States Navy	Fletcher	Destroyer	2,050	15 September 1942	sunk 16 April 1945
Pruitt	United States Navy	Clemson	Destroyer minelayer	1,190	9 June 1920	decommissioned 16 November 1945
Psara	Royal Hellenic Navy	Kountouriotis	Destroyer	1,389	1 May 1933	sunk 20 April 1941
Psilander	Swedish Navy	Psilander	Destroyer	950	8 January 1927	acquired from Italy 1940, commissioned 27 March 1940, scrapped 1949
Puke	Swedish Navy	Psilander	Destroyer	950	11 December 1926	acquired from Italy 1940, commissioned 27 March 1940, scrapped 1949
Punjabi	Royal Navy	Tribal	Destroyer	1,891	29 March 1939	sunk 1 May 1942
Purdy	United States Navy	Allen M. Sumner	Destroyer	2,200	18 July 1944	decommissioned 1973, sold for scrap 1974
Putnam	United States Navy	Allen M. Sumner	Destroyer	2,200	12 October 1944	decommissioned 1950, sold for scrap 1974
Quadrant	Royal Navy; Royal Australian Navy	Q	Destroyer	1,692	26 November 1942	sold for scrap 1962
Quail	Royal Navy	Q	Destroyer	1,692	7 January 1943	damaged by mine 15 November 1943, sunk under tow 18 May 1944
Quality	Royal Navy; Royal Australian Navy	Q	Destroyer	1,692	7 September 1942	sold for scrap 1958
Queenborough	Royal Navy; Royal Australian Navy	Q	Destroyer	1,692	15 September 1942	sold for scrap 1975
Quentin	Royal Navy	Q	Destroyer	1,692	15 April 1942	sunk 2 December 1942
Quiberon	Royal Navy; Royal Australian Navy	Q	Destroyer	1,692	6 July 1942	sold for scrap 15 February 1972
Quick	United States Navy	Gleaves	Destroyer	1,630	3 July 1942	decommissioned 1949, scrapped 1973
Quickmatch	Royal Navy	Q	Destroyer	1,692	14 September 1942	sold for scrap 1972
Quilliam	Royal Navy	Q	Destroyer flotilla leader	1,692	22 October 1942	to Netherlands as Banckert 21 November 1945, sold for scrap 1 February 1957
Quintino Sella	Regia Marina	Sella	Destroyer	950	25 March 1926	sunk 11 September 1943
Racehorse	Royal Navy	R	Destroyer	1,705	16 November 1942	scrapped 8 December 1949
Radford	United States Navy	Fletcher	Destroyer	2,050	22 July 1942	decommissioned 1969, sold for scrap 1970
Raider	Royal Navy	R	Destroyer	1,705	16 November 1942	to India as Rana 1949, scrapped 1979
Ralph Talbot	United States Navy	Bagley	Destroyer	1,500	14 October 1937	scuttled after A-bomb test, 1948
Ramsay	United States Navy	Wickes	Destroyer minelayer	1,190	15 February 1919	sold for scrap 21 November 1946
Ramsey	Royal Navy	Town	Destroyer	1,190	8 September 1919	sold for scrap 18 February 1947
Rapid	Royal Navy	R	Destroyer	1,705	20 February 1943	sunk as target 13 September 1981
Rathburne	United States Navy	Wickes	Destroyer	1,190	24 June 1918	sold for scrap November 1946
Rastoropny	Soviet Navy	Gnevny	Destroyer	1,587	5 January 1940	sold for scrap 27 April 1965
Razumny	Soviet Navy	Gnevny	Destroyer	1,587	7 November 1941	sold for scrap 4 May 1963
Razyaryonny	Soviet Navy	Gnevny	Destroyer	1,587	14 December 1941	sunk after a nuclear test 10 October 1957
Razyashchy	Soviet Navy	Gnevny	Destroyer	1,587	20 December 1940	sunk as a target 9 July 1961
Redky	Soviet Navy	Gnevny	Destroyer	1,587	29 November 1942	sold for scrap 26 February 1962
Reading	Royal Navy	Town	Destroyer	1,190	27 June 1919	sold for scrap July 1945
Redoubt	Royal Navy	R	Destroyer	1,705	1 October 1942	to the India as Ranjit 1949, scrapped 1979
Regele Ferdinand	Royal Romanian Navy	Regele Ferdinand	Destroyer	1,400	7 September 1930	to Soviet Navy as Likhoy 5 September 1944, returned to Romania 24 June 1951, scrapped 1961
Regina Maria	Royal Romanian Navy	Regele Ferdinand	Destroyer	1,400	7 September 1930	to Soviet Navy as Letuchy 5 September 1944, returned to Romania 24 June 1951, scrapped 1961
Reid	United States Navy	Mahan	Destroyer	1,450	2 November 1936	sunk 11 December 1944
Rekordny	Soviet Navy	Gnevny	Destroyer	1,587	9 January 1941	to People's Republic of China as Anshan 6 July 1955, preserved as museum ship
Relentless	Royal Navy	R	Destroyer	1,705	30 November 1942	sold for scrap 1971
Remey	United States Navy	Fletcher	Destroyer	2,050	30 September 1943	decommissioned 1963, sold for scrap 1976
Remus	Swedish Navy	Romulus	Destroyer	870	30 May 1935	acquired from Italy in 1940, stricken 1958
Renshaw	United States Navy	Fletcher	Destroyer	2,050	5 December 1942	decommissioned and sold for scrap 1970
Reshitelny	Soviet Navy	Gnevny	Destroyer	1,587	5 September 1941	to People's Republic of China as Changchun 14 January 1955, preserved as museum ship
Restigouche	Royal Canadian Navy	River	Destroyer	1,375	15 June 1938	paid off 6 October 1945
Retivy	Soviet Navy	Gnevny	Destroyer	1,587	10 October 1941	to People's Republic of China as Jilin 14 January 1955, preserved as museum ship
Reuben James	United States Navy	Clemson	Destroyer	1,215	24 September 1920	sunk by U-552, 31 October 1941
Revnostny	Soviet Navy	Gnevny	Destroyer	1,587	14 December 1941	sold for scrap 28 December 1962
Rezky	Soviet Navy	Gnevny	Destroyer	1,587	16 August 1942	to People's Republic of China as Fushun 6 July 1955, scrapped late 1980s
Rezvy	Soviet Navy	Gnevny	Destroyer	1,587	24 January 1940	sold for scrap 3 April 1958
Rhind	United States Navy	Benham	Destroyer	1,656	10 November 1939	scuttled after A-bomb test 1948
Rich	United States Navy	Gearing	Destroyer	2,616	3 July 1946	decommissioned 1977, scrapped 1979
Richard B. Anderson	United States Navy	Gearing	Destroyer	2,616	26 October 1945	to Taiwan as Kai Yang 1977, sunk as artificial reef 1999
Richard E. Kraus	United States Navy	Gearing	Destroyer	2,616	23 May 1946	to South Korea as Gwangju 1977, scrapped 2000
Richard P. Leary	United States Navy	Fletcher	Destroyer	2,050	23 February 1944	to Japan as Yūgure 1959, returned to US 1974, sold for scrap 1976
Richmond	Royal Navy; Royal Canadian Navy; Soviet Navy	Town	Destroyer	1,060	26 November 1940	to Canada 1942, to USSR 16 July 1944 as Zhivuchy
Ringgold	United States Navy	Fletcher	Destroyer	2,050	30 December 1942	to West Germany as Zerstörer 2 1959, to Greece as Kimon 1981, scrapped 1993
Rio Grande do Norte	Brazilian Navy	Pará	Destroyer	560	1909	decommissioned 1944
Ripley	Royal Navy	Town	Destroyer	1,190	3 July 1919	sold for scrap 20 March 1945
Riquelme	Chilean Navy	Serrano	Destroyer	1,090	15 April 1929	stricken 30 January 1963
Robert H. McCard	United States Navy	Gearing	Destroyer	2,616	23 October 1946	to Turkey as Kılıçalipaşa 1980, scrapped 2000
Robert H. Smith	United States Navy	Robert H. Smith	Destroyer minelayer	2,200	4 August 1944	decommissioned 1947, stricken 1971
Robert K. Huntington	United States Navy	Allen M. Sumner	Destroyer	2,200	3 March 1945	to Venezuela as Falcon 1973, scrapped 1981
Robert L. Wilson	United States Navy	Gearing	Destroyer	2,616	28 March 1946	decommissioned 1974, sunk as target 1980
Robinson	United States Navy	Fletcher	Destroyer	2,050	31 January 1944	decommissioned 1964, sunk as target 1982
Rocket	Royal Navy	R	Destroyer	1,705	4 August 1943	decommissioned 11 May 1962, scrapped March 1967
Rockingham	Royal Navy	Town	Destroyer	1,190	8 August 1919	sunk 27 September 1944
Rodman	United States Navy	Gleaves	Destroyer	1,630	29 April 1942	to Taiwan 1955, damaged and struck 1969, destroyed for motion picture 1976
Roe	United States Navy	Sims	Destroyer	1,570	5 January 1940	scrapped 1947
Roebuck	Royal Navy	R	Destroyer	1,705	10 June 1943	sold for scrap 1968
Rogers	United States Navy	Gearing	Destroyer	2,616	26 March 1945	to South Korea as Jeongju 1981, museum ship 1999
Romulus	Swedish Navy	Romulus	Destroyer	870	30 May 1935	acquired from Italy 1940, stricken 1958
Rooks	United States Navy	Fletcher	Destroyer	2,050	2 September 1944	to Chile as Cochrane 1962, scrapped 1983
Roper	United States Navy	Wickes	Destroyer	1,190	15 February 1919	sold for scrap 31 March 1946
Ross	United States Navy	Fletcher	Destroyer	2,050	21 February 1944	decommissioned 1959, sunk as target 1978
Rotherham	Royal Navy	R	Destroyer flotilla leader	1,705	1 August 1942	to India as Rajput 1949, scrapped 1976
Rowan (DD-405)	United States Navy	Benham	Destroyer	1,656	23 September 1939	sunk 11 September 1943
Rowan (DD-782)	United States Navy	Gearing	Destroyer	2,616	31 March 1945	to Taiwan as Chao Yang 1977, wrecked 1977
Rowe	United States Navy	Fletcher	Destroyer	2,050	13 March 1944	decommissioned 1959, sunk as target 1978
Roxborough	Royal Navy; Royal Canadian Navy; Soviet Navy	Town	Destroyer	1,060	23 September 1940	to Canada 1942, to USSR 1 August 1944 as Zhyostky
Rupertus	United States Navy	Gearing	Destroyer	2,616	8 March 1946	to Greece as Kountouriotis 1973, decommissioned 1994
Russell	United States Navy	Sims	Destroyer	1,570	3 November 1939	scrapped 1947
Ryany	Soviet Navy	Gnevny	Destroyer	1,587	11 August 1939	sunk as a target 8 January 1961
Sabre	Royal Navy	S (Admiralty)	Destroyer	1,075	1919	scrapped 1946
Saetta	Regia Marina	Dardo	Destroyer	1,206	10 May 1932	sunk 3 February 1943
Sagiri	Imperial Japanese Navy	Ayanami	Destroyer	1,750	30 January 1931	sunk 24 December 1941
Saguenay	Royal Canadian Navy	River	Destroyer	1,337	21 May 1931	paid up July 1945
Saintes	Royal Navy	Battle	Destroyer	2,325	27 September 1946	paid off May 1962, scrapped 1972
Sakura	Imperial Japanese Navy	Matsu	Destroyer	1,262	25 November 1944	sunk by mine 11 July 1945
Saladin	Royal Navy	S (Admiralty)	Destroyer	1,075	11 April 1919	scrapped November 1945
Salisbury	Royal Navy; Royal Canadian Navy	Town	Destroyer	1,190	5 December 1940	to Canada September 1942, paid off 10 December 1943, scrapped 1944
Samidare	Imperial Japanese Navy	Shiratsuyu	Destroyer	1,685	29 January 1937	sunk 25 August 1944
Sampson	United States Navy	Somers	Destroyer	1,850	19 August 1938	scrapped 1946
Samuel B. Roberts	United States Navy	Gearing	Destroyer	2,616	22 December 1946	decommissioned 1970, sunk as target 1971
Samuel N. Moore	United States Navy	Allen M. Sumner	Destroyer	2,200	24 June 1944	to China as Heng Yang 1969, sunk as target 1995
San Juan	Argentine Navy	Buenos Aires	Destroyer	1,353	23 March 1938	Discarded 1973
San Luis	Argentine Navy	Buenos Aires	Destroyer	1,375	23 March 1938	Discarded 3 May 1971
Sánchez Barcáiztegui	Spanish Navy	Churruca	Destroyer	1,620	1928	scrapped 1965
Sands	United States Navy	Clemson	Destroyer	1,190	10 November 1920	sold for scrap 23 May 1946
Santa Catarina	Brazilian Navy	Pará	Destroyer	560	1910	decommissioned 1944
Santa Cruz	Argentine Navy	Buenos Aires	Destroyer	1,353	26 September 1938	Discarded 1973
Sardonyx	Royal Navy	S (Admiralty)	Destroyer	1,075	12 July 1919	scrapped October 1945
Sarsfield	United States Navy	Gearing	Destroyer	2,616	31 July 1945	to Taiwan as Te Yang 1977, museum ship 2009
Satsuki	Imperial Japanese Navy	Mutsuki	Destroyer	1,315	15 November 1925	sunk 21 September 1944
Satterlee	United States Navy	Gleaves	Destroyer	1,630	1 July 1943	Decommissioned 16 March 1946, scrapped 1972
Saufley	United States Navy	Fletcher	Destroyer	2,050	29 August 1942	decommissioned 1965, sunk as target 1968
Saumarez	Royal Navy	S	Destroyer	1,710	1 July 1943	scrapped 1950
Savage	Royal Navy	S	Destroyer	1,710	8 June 1943	scrapped 11 April 1960
Sazanami	Imperial Japanese Navy	Ayanami	Destroyer	1,750	19 May 1932	sunk 14 January 1944
Schenck	United States Navy	Wickes	Destroyer	1,190	30 October 1919	sold for scrap 25 November 1946
Schley	United States Navy	Wickes	Destroyer	1,190	20 September 1918	scrapped 29 March 1946
Schroeder	United States Navy	Fletcher	Destroyer	2,050	1 January 1943	decommissioned 1946, sold for scrap 1974
Scimitar	Royal Navy	S (Admiralty)	Destroyer	1,075	13 April 1918	scrapped 29 June 1947
Scirocco	Regia Marina	Maestrale	Destroyer	1,640	21 October 1934	sunk 23 March 1942
Scorpion	Royal Navy	S	Destroyer	1,710	11 May 1943	paid off 16 August 1945
Scourge	Royal Navy	S	Destroyer	1,710	14 July 1943	to Netherlands 1 February 1946
Scout	Royal Navy	S (Admiralty)	Destroyer	1,075	15 June 1918	scrapped 2 March 1946
Selfridge	United States Navy	Porter	Destroyer	1,850	25 November 1936	scrapped 1947
Semmes	United States Navy	Clemson	Destroyer	1,215	21 February 1920	scrapped 25 November 1946
Serapis	Royal Navy	S	Destroyer	1,710	23 December 1943	to Netherlands as Piet Hein September 1945, scrapped 30 May 1962
Serdity	Soviet Navy	Storozhevoy	Destroyer	1,700	15 October 1940	sunk 19 July 1941
Sergipe	Brazilian Navy	Pará	Destroyer	560	1910	decommissioned 1944
Serrano	Chilean Navy	Serrano	Destroyer	1,090	18 December 1928	stricken 29 September 1966
Sfendoni	Royal Hellenic Navy	Thyella	Destroyer	350	1907	decommissioned post-war
Shannon	United States Navy	Robert H. Smith	Destroyer minelayer	2,200	8 September 1944	decommissioned 1955, sold for scrap 1973
Shark	Royal Norwegian Navy	S	Destroyer	1,710	11 March 1944	sunk 6 June 1944
Shaumyan	Soviet Navy	Fidonisy	Destroyer	1,460	10 December 1925	ran aground 3 April 1942 and later destroyed, scrapped post-war
Shaw	United States Navy	Mahan	Destroyer	1,450	18 September 1936	scrapped 1946
Shea	United States Navy	Robert H. Smith	Destroyer minelayer	2,200	30 September 1944	decommissioned 1958, sold for scrap 1974
Shelton	United States Navy	Gearing	Destroyer	2,616	21 June 1946	to Taiwan as Lai Yang 1973, sunk as artificial reef 2002
Sherwood	Royal Navy	Town	Destroyer	1,190	22 July 1919	scrapped 1945
Shields	United States Navy	Fletcher	Destroyer	2,050	8 February 1945	to Brazil as Maranhão 1972, scrapped 1990
Shigure	Imperial Japanese Navy	Shiratsuyu	Destroyer	1,685	7 September 1936	sunk 24 January 1945
Shii	Imperial Japanese Navy	Tachibana	Destroyer	1,288	13 March 1945	to USSR as Volny 22 July 1947, scrapped 8 August 1960
Shikari	Royal Navy	S (Admiralty)	Destroyer	1,075	April 1924	scrapped 4 November 1945
Shikinami	Imperial Japanese Navy	Ayanami	Destroyer	1,750	24 December 1929	sunk 12 September 1944
Shimakaze	Imperial Japanese Navy	prototype	Destroyer	2,570	10 May 1943	sunk 11 November 1944
Shimotsuki	Imperial Japanese Navy	Akizuki	Destroyer	2,700	31 March 1944	sunk 25 November 1944
Shinonome	Imperial Japanese Navy	Fubuki	Destroyer	1,750	25 July 1928	sunk 17 December 1941
Shirakumo	Imperial Japanese Navy	Fubuki	Destroyer	1,750	28 July 1928	sunk 16 March 1944
Shiranui	Imperial Japanese Navy	Kagerō	Destroyer	2,032	20 December 1939	sunk 27 October 1944
Shiratsuyu	Imperial Japanese Navy	Shiratsuyu	Destroyer	1,685	20 August 1936	sunk in collision 15 June 1944
Shirayuki	Imperial Japanese Navy	Fubuki	Destroyer	1,750	18 December 1928	sunk 3 March 1943
Shubrick	United States Navy	Gleaves	Destroyer	1,630	7 February 1943	scrapped 1947
Sicard	United States Navy	Clemson	Destroyer minelayer	1,215	9 June 1920	sold for scrap 22 June 1946
Sigourney	United States Navy	Fletcher	Destroyer	2,050	29 June 1943	decommissioned 1960, sold for scrap 1975
Sigsbee	United States Navy	Fletcher	Destroyer	2,050	23 January 1943	decommissioned 1947, sold for scrap 1975
Sikh	Royal Navy	Tribal	Destroyer	1,891	12 October 1938	sunk 14 September 1942
Silny	Soviet Navy	Storozhevoy	Destroyer	1,700	31 October 1940	scrapped 21 January 1960
Simoun	French Navy	Bourrasque	Destroyer	1,300	1 January 1926	scrapped 1950
Simpson	United States Navy	Clemson	Destroyer	1,215	3 November 1920	sold for scrap 21 November 1946
Sims	United States Navy	Sims	Destroyer	1,570	1 August 1939	sunk 7 May 1942
Sioux	Royal Canadian Navy	V	Destroyer	1,777	14 September 1943	paid off 30 October 1963
Siroco	French Navy	Bourrasque	Destroyer	1,300	1 July 1927	sunk 31 May 1940
Skate	Royal Navy	R (Admiralty)	Destroyer	900	19 February 1917	sold for scrap 1947
Skeena	Royal Canadian Navy	River	Destroyer	1,350	10 June 1931	sunk 25 October 1944
Skory	Soviet Navy	Storozhevoy	Destroyer	1,700	18 July 1941	sunk by naval mine 28 August 1941
Slavny	Soviet Navy	Storozhevoy	Destroyer	1,700	31 May 1941	scrapped 1964-1965
Sleipner	Royal Norwegian Navy	Sleipner	Destroyer	735	7 May 1936	decommissioned 10 March 1944, converted to frigate and recommissioned 1948, sold for scrap 1959
Sluys	Royal Navy	Battle	Destroyer	2,325	30 September 1946	paid off 1953
Smalley	United States Navy	Fletcher	Destroyer	2,050	31 March 1944	decommissioned 1957, sold for scrap 1966
Smely	Soviet Navy	Storozhevoy	Destroyer	1,700	31 May 1941	scuttled 27 July 1941
Smetlivy	Soviet Navy	Gnevny	Destroyer	1,587	6 November 1938	sunk 4 November 1941
Smith	United States Navy	Mahan	Destroyer	1,450	19 September 1936	scrapped 1946
Smyshlyony	Soviet Navy	Storozhevoy	Destroyer	1,700	10 November 1940	sunk 8 March 1942
Sokrushitelny	Soviet Navy	Gnevny	Destroyer	1,587	13 August 1939	sunk in a storm 22 November 1942
Soley	United States Navy	Allen M. Sumner	Destroyer	2,200	7 December 1944	decommissioned 1970, sunk as target 1970
Solebay	Royal Navy	Battle	Destroyer	2,325	25 September 1945	paid off April 1962, scrapped 1967
Somali	Royal Navy	Tribal	Destroyer	1,891	12 December 1938	sunk 24 September 1942
Somers	United States Navy	Somers	Destroyer	1,850	1 December 1937	scrapped 1947
Soobrazitelny	Soviet Navy	Storozhevoy	Destroyer	1,700	7 June 1941	scrapped 1966
Southard	United States Navy	Clemson	Destroyer minesweeper	1,215	24 September 1919	wrecked 9 October 1945, wreck destroyed 14 January 1946
Southerland	United States Navy	Gearing	Destroyer	2,616	22 December 1944	decommissioned 1981, sunk as target 1997
Sovershenny	Soviet Navy	Storozhevoy	Destroyer	1,700	30 September 1941	sunk 8 June 1942
Spence	United States Navy	Fletcher	Destroyer	2,050	8 January 1943	foundered 18 December 1944
Spetsai	Royal Hellenic Navy	Kountouriotis	Destroyer	1,389	1933	decommissioned 1946
Split	Royal Yugoslav Navy; Regia Marina		Destroyer	2,362	4 July 1958	captured incomplete by Italy as Spalato 14 April 1941, launched 18 July 1943, scuttled 24 September 1943, re-launched by SFR Yugoslavia as Split March 1950, commissioned 4 July 1958, scrapped 1986
Sposobny	Soviet Navy	Storozhevoy	Destroyer	1,700	24 June 1941	sunk 6 October 1943
Sproston	United States Navy	Fletcher	Destroyer	2,050	19 May 1943	decommissioned 1968, sold for scrap 1971
Squadrista	Regia Marina; Kriegsmarine	Soldati	Destroyer	1,850	Never commissioned	launched 12 September 1942, captured by Germany September 1943 and completed as TA33, sunk 4 September 1944
St Albans	Royal Navy; Royal Norwegian Navy; Soviet Navy	Town	Destroyer	1,190	23 September 1940	to Norway 14 April 1941, to USSR as Dostoyny 16 July 1944, scrapped 1949
St. Clair	Royal Canadian Navy	Town	Destroyer	1,190	24 September 1940	paid off 1946
St. Croix	Royal Canadian Navy	Town	Destroyer	1,215	24 September 1940	sunk 22 September 1943
St. Francis	Royal Canadian Navy	Town	Destroyer	1,215	24 September 1940	paid off 1945, sank under tow July 1945
St. Kitts	Royal Navy	Battle	Destroyer	2,325	21 January 1946	paid off 1957, scrapped February 1962
St. Laurent	Royal Canadian Navy	River	Destroyer	1,375	17 February 1937	paid off 10 October 1945
St. Mary's	Royal Navy	Town	Destroyer	1,190	27 August 1919	paid off February 1944, scrapped 1945
Stack	United States Navy	Benham	Destroyer	1,656	20 November 1939	scuttled after A-bomb test 1948
Stanley	Royal Navy	Town	Destroyer	1,060	19 May 1919	sunk 19 December 1941
Stanly	United States Navy	Fletcher	Destroyer	2,050	15 October 1942	decommissioned 1946, sold for scrap 1971
Stansbury	United States Navy	Wickes	Destroyer minesweeper	1,190	8 January 1920	sold for scrap 26 October 1946
Stalin	Soviet Navy	Orfey	Destroyer	1,260	21 November 1916	scrapped 1953
Statny	Soviet Navy	Storozhevoy	Destroyer	1,700	9 July 1941	sank in a storm 23 August 1941
Steinaker	United States Navy	Gearing	Destroyer	2,616	26 May 1945	to Mexico as Netzahualcóyotl 1982, decommissioned 2014
Stembel	United States Navy	Fletcher	Destroyer	2,050	16 July 1943	loaned to Argentina as Rosales 1961, scrapped 1982
Stephen Potter	United States Navy	Fletcher	Destroyer	2,050	21 October 1943	decommissioned 1958, sold for scrap 1973
Steregushchy	Soviet Navy	Gnevny	Destroyer	1,587	30 October 1939	sunk 21 September 1941, salvaged 1944, returned to service 1948, scrapped 1959
Sterett	United States Navy	Benham	Destroyer	1,656	15 August 1939	scrapped 1947
Stevens	United States Navy	Fletcher	Destroyer	2,050	1 February 1943	decommissioned 1946, sold for scrap 1973
Stevenson	United States Navy	Gleaves	Destroyer	1,630	15 December 1942	decommissioned 1946, scrapped 1970
Stewart	United States Navy; Imperial Japanese Navy	Clemson	Destroyer	1,085	15 September 1920	scuttled 2 March 1942, raised by Japan and recommissioned as Dai-102-Gō shōkaitei September 1943, returned to US as DD-224 29 October 1945, sunk as target 24 May 1946
Stickell	United States Navy	Gearing	Destroyer	2,616	31 October 1945	to Greece as Kanaris 1972, scrapped 2002
Stockholm	Swedish Navy	Göteborg	Destroyer	1,020	24 November 1937	decommissioned 1 January 1964 and scrapped
Stockham	United States Navy	Fletcher	Destroyer	2,050	11 February 1944	decommissioned 1957, sunk as target 1977
Stockton	United States Navy	Gleaves	Destroyer	1,630	11 January 1943	decommissioned 1946, scrapped 1973
Stoddard	United States Navy	Fletcher	Destroyer	2,050	15 April 1944	decommissioned 1969, sunk as target 1997
Stord	Royal Norwegian Navy	S	Destroyer	1,710	29 September 1943	scrapped 1959
Stormes	United States Navy	Allen M. Sumner	Destroyer	2,200	27 January 1945	to Iran as Palang 1972, decommissioned 1994
Storozhevoy	Soviet Navy	Storozhevoy	Destroyer	1,700	6 October 1940	scrapped 1958-1959
Stoyky	Soviet Navy	Storozhevoy	Destroyer	1,700	18 October 1940	sank in storm 2 July 1960
Strale	Regia Marina	Dardo	Destroyer	1,206	6 February 1932	ran aground 21 March 1942, destroyed 6 August 1942
Strashny	Soviet Navy	Storozhevoy	Destroyer	1,700	22 June 1941	scrapped 12 January 1960
Stremitelny	Soviet Navy	Gnevny	Destroyer	1,587	18 November 1938	sunk 20 July 1941
Stribling	United States Navy	Gearing	Destroyer	2,616	29 September 1945	decommissioned 1976, sunk as target 1980
Stringham	United States Navy	Wickes	Destroyer	1,190	2 July 1918	scrapped March 1946
Strogy	Soviet Navy	Storozhevoy	Destroyer	1,700	22 September 1941	scrapped 26 June 1964
Strong (DD-467)	United States Navy	Fletcher	Destroyer	2,050	7 August 1942	sunk 5 July 1943
Strong (DD-758)	United States Navy	Allen M. Sumner	Destroyer	2,200	8 March 1945	to Brazil as Rio Grande do Norte 1973, sunk 1997
Stronghold	Royal Navy	S (Admiralty)	Destroyer	1,075	2 July 1919	sunk 4 March 1942
Stroyny	Soviet Navy	Storozhevoy	Destroyer	1,700	22 September 1941	scrapped 1965-1966
Stuart	Royal Australian Navy	Admiralty type	Destroyer flotilla leader	1,530	14 December 1919	paid off 27 April 1946
Sturdy	Royal Navy	S (Admiralty)	Destroyer	1,075	October 1919	constructive loss 30 October 1940
Sturtevant	United States Navy	Clemson	Destroyer	1,215	21 September 1920	sunk 26 April 1942
Sugi	Imperial Japanese Navy	Matsu	Destroyer	1,262	25 August 1944	to Republic of China as Hui Yang 31 July 1947, struck 11 November 1954, scrapped 1954
Sultanhisar	Turkish Naval Forces	Demirhisar	Destroyer	1,360	28 June 1941	decommissioned 1960
Sumire (1921)	Imperial Japanese Navy	Momi	Destroyer	850	31 March 1923	decommissioned 1 February 1940, converted to auxiliary ship Mitaka, scrapped 1948
Sumire (1944)	Imperial Japanese Navy	Tachibana	Destroyer	1,288	26 March 1945	to United Kingdom 23 August 1947, sunk as target 1947
Sundsvall	Swedish Navy	Visby	Destroyer	1,135	17 September 1943	decommissioned 1 July 1982, scrapped 1984
Surovy	Soviet Navy	Storozhevoy	Destroyer	1,700	31 May 1941	scuttled 13 November 1941
Susuki	Imperial Japanese Navy	Momi	Destroyer	850	5 May 1921	converted to patrol boat Dai-34-Gō shōkaitei 1 April 1940, sunk 3 July 1944
Suzukaze	Imperial Japanese Navy	Shiratsuyu	Destroyer	1,685	31 August 1937	sunk 25 January 1944
Suzunami	Imperial Japanese Navy	Yūgumo	Destroyer	2,077	27 July 1943	sunk 11 November 1943
Suzutsuki	Imperial Japanese Navy	Akizuki	Destroyer	2,700	29 December 1942	converted to breakwater July 1948
Svirepy	Soviet Navy	Storozhevoy	Destroyer	1,700	22 June 1941	scrapped 28 January 1958
Svobodny	Soviet Navy	Storozhevoy	Destroyer	1,700	2 January 1942	sunk 10 June 1942
Swanson	United States Navy	Gleaves	Destroyer	1,630	29 May 1941	decommissioned 1945, scrapped 1972
Swift	Royal Navy	S	Destroyer	1,710	12 December 1943	sunk 24 June 1944
Tachibana	Imperial Japanese Navy	Tachibana	Destroyer	1,288	20 January 1945	sunk 14 July 1945
Tade	Imperial Japanese Navy	Momi	Destroyer	850	31 July 1922	converted to patrol boat Dai-39-Gō shōkaitei 1 April 1940, sunk 23 April 1943
Takanami	Imperial Japanese Navy	Yūgumo	Destroyer	2,077	31 August 1942	sunk 30 November 1942
Take (1919)	Imperial Japanese Navy	Momi	Destroyer	850	25 December 1919	decommissioned 1 February 1940, converted to training ship, scuttled as breakwater 1948
Take (1944)	Imperial Japanese Navy	Matsu	Destroyer	1,262	16 June 1944	to United Kingdom 16 July 1947, scrapped
Talbot	United States Navy	Wickes	Destroyer	1,190	20 July 1918	sold for scrap 30 January 1946
Tamanami	Imperial Japanese Navy	Yūgumo	Destroyer	2,077	30 April 1943	sunk 7 July 1944
Tâmega	Portuguese Navy	Guadiana	Destroyer	700	19 August 1924	discarded 2 September 1942
Tanikaze	Imperial Japanese Navy	Kagerō	Destroyer	2,032	25 April 1941	sunk 9 June 1944
Tarbell	United States Navy	Wickes	Destroyer	1,190	27 November 1918	sold for scrap 30 November 1945
Tartar	Royal Navy	Tribal	Destroyer	1,891	10 March 1939	scrapped 22 February 1948
Tartu	French Navy	Vauquelin	Destroyer	2,402	31 December 1932	scuttled 27 November 1942, scrapped 1956
Tashkent	Soviet Navy	Tashkent	Destroyer flotilla leader	2,840	22 October 1940	sunk 2 July 1942, raised 30 August 1944, scrapped post-war
Tattnall	United States Navy	Wickes	Destroyer	1,060	26 June 1919	Decommissioned 17 December 1945
Taussig	United States Navy	Allen M. Sumner	Destroyer	2,200	20 May 1944	to China as Lo Yang 1974, sold for scrap 2013
Taylor	United States Navy	Fletcher	Destroyer	2,050	28 August 1942	to Italy as Lanciere 1969, cannibalized for spare parts 1971
Tbilisi	Soviet Navy	Leningrad	Destroyer flotilla leader	2,350	11 December 1940	scrapped 31 January 1964
Teazer	Royal Navy	T	Destroyer	1,710	13 September 1943	Scrapped 7 August 1965
Tejo	Portuguese Navy	Douro	Destroyer	1,219	12 October 1935	stricken 9 February 1965
Tempête	French Navy	Bourrasque	Destroyer	1,300	20 July 1926	scrapped 1950
Tenacious	Royal Navy	T	Destroyer	1,710	30 October 1943	scrapped June 1965
Tenedos	Royal Navy	S (Admiralty)	Destroyer	1,075	1919	sunk 5 April 1942
Teniente Rodríguez	Peruvian Navy	Chasseur	Destroyer	443	1911	hulked 1939
Termagant	Royal Navy	T	Destroyer	1,710	8 October 1943	paid off 1960, scrapped 5 November 1965
Terpsichore	Royal Navy	T	Destroyer	1,710	20 January 1944	scrapped 17 May 1966
Terry	United States Navy	Fletcher	Destroyer	2,050	26 January 1943	decommissioned 1947, to Peru as spare parts 1974
Teruel	Spanish Navy	Alessandro Poerio	Destroyer	845	20 August 1915	decommissioned and scrapped 1948
Teruzuki	Imperial Japanese Navy	Akizuki	Destroyer	2,700	31 August 1942	sunk 12 December 1942
Thanet	Royal Navy	S (Admiralty)	Destroyer	1,075	3 August 1919	sunk 27 January 1942
Thatcher	United States Navy	Fletcher	Destroyer	2,050	10 February 1943	decommissioned 1945, sold for scrap 1948
The Sullivans	United States Navy	Fletcher	Destroyer	2,050	4 April 1943	museum ship since 1977
Theodore E. Chandler	United States Navy	Gearing	Destroyer	2,616	22 March 1946	decommissioned and scrapped 1975
Thomas E. Fraser	United States Navy	Robert H. Smith	Destroyer minelayer	2,200	22 August 1944	decommissioned 1955, sold for scrap 1974
Thompson	United States Navy	Gleaves	Destroyer	1,630	10 July 1943	decommissioned 1954, scrapped 1972
Thorn	United States Navy	Gleaves	Destroyer	1,630	1 April 1943	decommissioned 1946, sunk as target 1974
Thornton	United States Navy	Clemson	Destroyer	1,215	15 July 1919	beached and decommissioned 2 May 1945, hull abandoned and donated to the government of the Ryukyu Islands July 1957
Thracian	Royal Navy; Imperial Japanese Navy	S (Admiralty)	Destroyer	1,075	1 April 1922	grounded 17 December 1941, raised by Japan 24 December 1941, recommissioned as Dai-102-Gō shōkaitei 1 October 1942, returned to UK October 1945, scrapped February 1946
Thyella	Royal Hellenic Navy	Thyella	Destroyer	350	1907	sunk 21 April 1941
Tigre	Regia Marina	Leone	Destroyer	2,195	10 October 1924	scuttled 3 / 4 April 1941
Tigre	French Navy; Regia Marina; Free French Naval Forces	Chacal	Destroyer	2,092	10 October 1926	to Italy as FR 23 14 December 1942, to Free France as Tigre 28 October 1943, scrapped 1955
Tillman	United States Navy	Gleaves	Destroyer	1,630	4 June 1942	decommissioned 1947, scrapped 1972
Tinaztepe	Turkish Naval Forces	Tinaztepe	Destroyer	1,206	6 June 1932	decommissioned February 1954
Tingey	United States Navy	Fletcher	Destroyer	2,050	25 November 1943	decommissioned 1963, sunk as target 1966
Tjerk Hiddes	Royal Netherlands Navy	Gerard Callenburgh	Destroyer	1,604	Never commissioned	construction incomplete, scuttled 15 May 1940, later salvaged and scrapped by Germany
Tjerk Hiddes (G16)	Royal Netherlands Navy	N	Destroyer	1,773	30 October 1942	to Indonesia as Gadjah Mada 1 March 1951, scrapped 1961
Tochi	Imperial Japanese Navy	Tachibana	Destroyer	1,288	Never commissioned	construction discontinued 18 May 1945, launched 28 May 1945, converted to breakwater
Tokitsukaze	Imperial Japanese Navy	Kagerō	Destroyer	2,032	15 December 1940	sunk 3 March 1943
Tolman	United States Navy	Robert H. Smith	Destroyer minelayer	2,200	27 October 1944	decommissioned 1947, sunk as target 1997
Tor	Royal Norwegian Navy; Kriegsmarine	Sleipner	Destroyer	735	13 June 1940	trials and shakedown cruise 9 April 1940, scuttled 9 April 1940, raised by Germany 16 April 1940, commissioned as Tiger 13 June 1940, returned to Norway May 1945, sold for scrap 1959
Tornade	French Navy	Bourrasque	Destroyer	1,300	1 October 1927	sunk 8 November 1942
Tracy	United States Navy	Clemson	Destroyer minelayer	1,215	9 March 1920	sold for scrap 16 May 1946
Trafalgar	Royal Navy	Battle	Destroyer	2,325	23 July 1945	paid off 1963, scrapped 1970
Tramontane	French Navy	Bourrasque	Destroyer	1,300	15 May 1927	sunk 8 November 1942
Trathen	United States Navy	Fletcher	Destroyer	2,050	28 May 1943	decommissioned 1965, used as target hulk 1973
Trever	United States Navy	Clemson	Destroyer minesweeper	1,215	3 August 1922	sold for scrap 12 November 1946
Trippe	United States Navy	Benham	Destroyer	1,656	1 November 1939	scuttled after A-bomb test 1948
Troll	Royal Norwegian Navy; Kriegsmarine	Draug	Destroyer	578	13 March 1912	abandoned 4 May 1940, captured by Germany 18 May 1940, returned to Norway May 1945, scrapped 1949
Trombe	French Navy; Free French Naval Forces	Bourrasque	Destroyer	1,300	1 June 1927	scuttled 27 November 1942, salvaged and repaired by Italians, to Free France 28 October 1943, scrapped 1950
Troubridge	Royal Navy	T	Destroyer	1,710	8 March 1943	paid off 27 March 1969, scrapped 1970
Truxtun	United States Navy	Clemson	Destroyer	1,215	30 December 1920	ran aground and sunk 18 February 1942
Tsubaki	Imperial Japanese Navy	Matsu	Destroyer	1,262	30 November 1944	scrapped 28 July 1948
Tsuga	Imperial Japanese Navy	Momi	Destroyer	850	20 July 1920	sunk 15 January 1945
Tsuta (1921)	Imperial Japanese Navy	Momi	Destroyer	850	30 June 1921	converted to patrol boat Dai-35-Gō shōkaitei 1 April 1940, sunk 2 September 1942
Tsuta (1944)	Imperial Japanese Navy	Tachibana	Destroyer	1,288	8 February 1945	to Republic of China as Hua Yang 31 July 1947, ran aground 1949, struck 1954
Tucker	United States Navy	Mahan	Destroyer	1,450	23 July 1936	sunk 4 August 1942
Tucuman	Argentine Navy	Mendoza	Destroyer	1,570	3 May 1929	discarded 30 April 1962
Tumult	Royal Navy	T	Destroyer	1,710	2 April 1943	scrapped 25 October 1965
Tung Chun	Republic of China-Nanjing Navy	Chang Feng	Destroyer	384	7 November 1912	abandoned 1944
Turbine	Regia Marina; Kriegsmarine	Turbine	Destroyer	1,070	27 August 1927	captured by Germany as TA14 9 September 1943, sunk 16 September 1944
Turner (DD-648)	United States Navy	Gleaves	Destroyer	1,630	15 April 1943	exploded 3 January 1944
Turner (DD-834)	United States Navy	Gearing	Destroyer	2,616	12 June 1945	decommissioned 1969, scrapped 1970
Tuscan	Royal Navy	T	Destroyer	1,710	11 March 1943	scrapped 26 May 1966
Twiggs	United States Navy	Fletcher	Destroyer	2,050	4 November 1943	sunk 16 June 1945
Twining	United States Navy	Fletcher	Destroyer	2,050	1 December 1943	to Taiwan as Kwei Yang 1971, sunk as target 1999
Typhon	French Navy; Free French Naval Forces	Bourrasque	Destroyer	1,300	15 February 1928	scuttled 10 November 1942
Tyrian	Royal Navy	T	Destroyer	1,710	8 April 1943	scrapped 9 March 1965
Ugolino Vivaldi	Regia Marina	Navigatori	Destroyer	1,900	6 March 1930	scuttled 10 September 1943
Uhlmann	United States Navy	Fletcher	Destroyer	2,050	22 November 1943	decommissioned 1972, sold for scrap 1974
Ulloa	Spanish Navy	Churruca	Destroyer	1,535	1937	stricken 1960s
Ulster	Royal Navy	U	Destroyer	1,777	30 June 1943	paid off 1977, scrapped 1980
Ulysses	Royal Navy	U	Destroyer	1,777	23 December 1943	paid off 1963, scrapped 1970
Ume	Imperial Japanese Navy	Matsu	Destroyer	1,262	28 June 1944	sunk 31 January 1945
Umikaze	Imperial Japanese Navy	Shiratsuyu	Destroyer	1,685	31 May 1937	sunk 1 February 1944
Undaunted	Royal Navy	U	Destroyer	1,777	3 March 1944	paid off 1974, sunk as target 1978
Undine	Royal Navy	U	Destroyer	1,777	23 December 1943	scrapped November 1965
Upshur	United States Navy	Wickes	Destroyer	1,190	23 December 1918	sold for scrap 26 September 1947
Urakaze	Imperial Japanese Navy	Kagerō	Destroyer	2,032	15 December 1940	sunk 21 November 1944
Uranami	Imperial Japanese Navy	Fubuki	Destroyer	1,750	30 June 1929	sunk 26 October 1944
Urania	Royal Navy	U	Destroyer	1,777	18 January 1944	scrapped 1971
Urchin	Royal Navy	U	Destroyer	1,777	24 September 1943	paid off 1964, scrapped 1967
Uritsky	Soviet Navy	Orfey	Destroyer	1,260	9 November 1915	sunk as target in nuclear test 21 September 1955
Ursa	Royal Navy	U	Destroyer	1,777	23 December 1943	paid off November 1966
Ushio	Imperial Japanese Navy	Ayanami	Destroyer	1,750	14 November 1931	surrendered 15 August 1945, scrapped 1948
Usugumo	Imperial Japanese Navy	Fubuki	Destroyer	1,750	26 July 1928	sunk 7 July 1944
Uzuki	Imperial Japanese Navy	Mutsuki	Destroyer	1,315	14 September 1926	sunk 12 December 1944
Valentine	Royal Navy	V (Admiralty leader)	Destroyer flotilla leader	1,188	27 June 1917	constructive loss 15 May 1940
Valerian Kuybyshev	Soviet Navy	Orfey	Destroyer	1,260	15 October 1927	scrapped 1957
Valmy	French Navy; Regia Marina; Kriegsmarine	Guépard	Destroyer	2,398	1 January 1930	scuttled 27 November 1942, refloated 15 March 1943 and repaired, to Italy as FR 24, captured by Germany September 1943, scrapped 1945
Valorous	Royal Navy	V (Admiralty leader)	Destroyer flotilla leader	1,316	21 August 1917	paid off 15 August 1945, sold for scrap 4 March 1947
Vampire	Royal Australian Navy	V (Admiralty leader)	Destroyer flotilla leader	1,188	22 September 1917	sunk 9 April 1942
Van Galen	Royal Netherlands Navy	Admiralen	Destroyer	1,316	22 October 1929	sunk 10 May 1940, raised 23 October 1941 and scrapped
Van Galen (G84)	Royal Netherlands Navy	N	Destroyer	1,773	20 February 1942	scrapped February 1957
Van Ghent	Royal Netherlands Navy	Admiralen	Destroyer	1,316	31 May 1928	ran aground and scuttled 15 February 1942
Van Nes	Royal Netherlands Navy	Admiralen	Destroyer	1,316	12 March 1931	sunk 17 February 1942
Van Valkenburgh	United States Navy	Fletcher	Destroyer	2,050	2 August 1944	to Turkey as İzmir 1972, sold for scrap 1987
Vanessa	Royal Navy	V (Admiralty)	Destroyer	1,272	21 June 1918	paid off 1945, scrapped 4 March 1947
Vanity	Royal Navy	V (Admiralty)	Destroyer	1,272	21 June 1918	paid off 1945, scrapped 4 March 1947
Vanoc	Royal Navy	V (Admiralty)	Destroyer	1,272	15 August 1917	scrapped in July 1945
Vanquisher	Royal Navy	V (Admiralty)	Destroyer	1,272	2 October 1917	paid off June 1945, scrapped 4 May 1947
Vansittart	Royal Navy	W (Admiralty)	Destroyer	1,140	5 November 1919	scrapped 25 February 1946
Vasilefs Georgios	Royal Hellenic Navy; Kriegsmarine	G	Destroyer	1,350	15 February 1939	captured by Germany as ZG3 Hermes 21 March 1942, scuttled 7 May 1943
Vasilissa Olga	Royal Hellenic Navy	G	Destroyer	1,350	4 February 1939	sunk 26 September 1943
Vauban	French Navy	Guépard	Destroyer	2,398	9 January 1931	scuttled 27 November 1942, refloated 12 May 1947 and broken up
Vautour	French Navy	Aigle	Destroyer	2,402	2 May 1932	scuttled 27 November 1942, refloated 17 January 1943, sunk 4 February 1944, scrapped 1951
Vauquelin	French Navy	Vauquelin	Destroyer	2,402	1 June 1933	scuttled 27 November 1942, scrapped 1951
Vega	Royal Navy	V (Admiralty)	Destroyer	1,272	14 December 1917	paid off 1945, scrapped 4 March 1947
Velasco	Spanish Navy	Alsedo	Destroyer	1,044	1925	stricken 1957
Velite	Regia Marina	Soldati	Destroyer	1,850	31 August 1942	to France as Duperré 24 July 1948, struck 1961
Velox	Royal Navy	V (Admiralty)	Destroyer	1,272	1 April 1918	scrapped 1947
Vendetta	Royal Australian Navy	V (Admiralty)	Destroyer	1,272	17 October 1917	scuttled 2 July 1948
Venetia	Royal Navy	V (Admiralty)	Destroyer	1,272	19 December 1917	sunk 19 October 1940
Venomous	Royal Navy	W (Admiralty)	Destroyer	1,140	24 August 1919	scrapped 4 March 1947
Venus	Royal Navy	V	Destroyer	1,777	28 August 1943	scrapped 1972
Verdun	Royal Navy	V (Admiralty)	Destroyer	1,272	3 November 1917	scrapped April 1946
Verdun	French Navy	Guépard	Destroyer	2,398	1 April 1930	scuttled 27 November 1942, refloated 29 September 1943, sunk 1944, refloated 1948 and broken up
Verity	Royal Navy	W (Admiralty)	Destroyer	1,140	17 September 1919	scrapped 4 March 1947
Versatile	Royal Navy	V (Admiralty)	Destroyer	1,272	11 February 1918	scrapped 7 May 1947
Verulam	Royal Navy	V	Destroyer	1,777	10 December 1943	scrapped 1972
Vesole	United States Navy	Gearing	Destroyer	2,616	23 April 1945	decommissioned 1976, sunk as target 1983
Vesper	Royal Navy	V (Admiralty)	Destroyer	1,272	20 February 1918	scrapped 7 March 1947
Veteran	Royal Navy	W (Admiralty)	Destroyer	1,140	13 November 1919	sunk 26 September 1942
Viceroy	Royal Navy	V (Thornycroft)	Destroyer	1,120	18 January 1918	paid off 15 May 1947
Videla	Chilean Navy	Serrano	Destroyer	1,090	26 July 1929	stricken 12 February 1958
Vidette	Royal Navy	V (Admiralty)	Destroyer	1,272	27 April 1918	scrapped 1947
Vigilant	Royal Navy	V	Destroyer	1,777	22 December 1942	paid off 1963, scrapped 6 June 1965
Vimiera	Royal Navy	V (Admiralty)	Destroyer	1,272	19 September 1918	sunk 9 January 1942
Vimy	Royal Navy	V (Admiralty)	Destroyer	1,272	28 December 1917	paid off March 1947
Vincenzo Gioberti	Regia Marina	Oriani	Destroyer	1,750	27 October 1937	sunk 9 August 1943
Virago	Royal Navy	V	Destroyer	1,777	5 November 1943	scrapped 1965
Visby	Swedish Navy	Visby	Destroyer	1,135	10 August 1943	decommissioned 1 July 1982, scrapped 1984
Viscount	Royal Navy	V (Thornycroft)	Destroyer	1,120	4 March 1918	scrapped 20 March 1945
Vittorio Alfieri	Regia Marina	Oriani	Destroyer	1,750	1 December 1937	sunk 28 March 1941
Vivacious	Royal Navy	V (Admiralty)	Destroyer	1,272	29 December 1917	scrapped 7 May 1947
Vivien	Royal Navy	V (Admiralty)	Destroyer	1,207	28 May 1918	scrapped 18 February 1948
Vogelgesang	United States Navy	Gearing	Destroyer	2,616	28 April 1945	to Mexico as Quetzalcoatl 1982, sunk as artificial reef 2006
Volage	Royal Navy	V	Destroyer	1,777	26 May 1944	scrapped 1977
Volodarsky	Soviet Navy	Orfey	Destroyer	1,260	6 November 1915	sunk 28 August 1941
Volta	French Navy	Mogador	Destroyer	2,950	6 March 1939	scuttled 27 November 1942, refloated by Italy 20 May 1943, scrapped 1948
Volunteer	Royal Navy	W (Admiralty)	Destroyer	1,140	7 November 1919	scrapped 4 March 1947
Vortigern	Royal Navy	V (Admiralty)	Destroyer	1,272	21 January 1918	sunk 15 March 1942
Vouga	Portuguese Navy	Douro	Destroyer	1,219	24 June 1933	discarded 3 June 1967
Voyager	Royal Australian Navy	W (Admiralty)	Destroyer	1,100	15 May 1918	scuttled 23 September 1942
Voykov	Soviet Navy	Orfey	Destroyer	1,260	30 November 1916	scrapped 28 August 1956
Wachtmeister	Swedish Navy	Wrangel	Destroyer	465	19 October 1918	paid off 13 June 1947, sold for scrap 1950
Wadleigh	United States Navy	Fletcher	Destroyer	2,050	19 October 1943	to Chile as Blanco Encalada 1972, sunk as target 1991
Wadsworth	United States Navy	Fletcher	Destroyer	2,050	16 March 1943	to West Germany as Zerstörer 3 1959, to Greece as Nearchos 1980, scrapped 1991
Wager	Royal Navy	W	Destroyer	1,710	14 April 1944	paid off January 1946
Wainwright	United States Navy	Sims	Destroyer	1,570	15 April 1940	scuttled after A-bomb test 1948
Wakaba	Imperial Japanese Navy	Hatsuharu	Destroyer	1,802	31 October 1934	sunk 24 October 1944
Wakatsuki	Imperial Japanese Navy	Akizuki	Destroyer	2,700	31 May 1943	sunk 11 November 1944
Wakeful (H88)	Royal Navy	W (Admiralty)	Destroyer	1,100	16 December 1917	sunk 29 May 1940
Wakeful (R59)	Royal Navy	W	Destroyer	1,730	17 February 1944	scrapped 10 June 1971
Wale	Swedish Navy		Destroyer	350	11 April 1908	sunk as target 26 September 1946
Waldron	United States Navy	Allen M. Sumner	Destroyer	2,200	7 June 1944	to Colombia as Santander 1973, sold for scrap 1986
Walke (DD-416)	United States Navy	Sims	Destroyer	1,570	27 April 1940	sunk 15 November 1942
Walke (DD-723)	United States Navy	Allen M. Sumner	Destroyer	2,200	21 January 1944	decommissioned 1947, sold for scrap 1975
Walker	United States Navy	Fletcher	Destroyer	2,050	3 April 1943	to Italy as Fante 1969, scrapped 1977
Walker	Royal Navy	W (Admiralty)	Destroyer	1,100	12 February 1918	scrapped 15 March 1946
Wallace	Royal Navy	Thornycroft type	AA escort flotilla leader	1,480	14 February 1919	scrapped 20 March 1945s
Wallace L. Lind	United States Navy	Allen M. Sumner	Destroyer	2,200	8 September 1944	to South Korea as Daegu 1973, scrapped 1994
Waller	United States Navy	Fletcher	Destroyer	2,050	1 October 1942	decommissioned 1969, sunk as target 1970
Walpole	Royal Navy	W (Admiralty)	Destroyer	1,100	7 August 1918	constructive loss 6 January 1945
Wanderer	Royal Navy	W (Admiralty)	Destroyer	1,140	18 September 1919	scrapped 31 January 1946
Ward	United States Navy	Wickes	Destroyer	1,190	24 July 1918	Sunk 7 December 1944
Warramunga	Royal Australian Navy	Tribal	Destroyer	2,031	23 November 1942	sold for scrap 15 February 1963
Warrington (DD-383)	United States Navy	Somers	Destroyer	1,850	9 February 1938	foundered in hurricane 13 September 1944
Warrington (DD-843)	United States Navy	Gearing	Destroyer	2,616	20 December 1945	to Taiwan as spare parts 1973
Warwick	Royal Navy	W (Admiralty)	Destroyer	1,100	18 March 1918	sunk 20 February 1944
Wasmuth	United States Navy	Clemson	Destroyer minesweeper	1,215	16 December 1921	sank during a storm 29 December 1942
Watchman	Royal Navy	W (Admiralty)	Destroyer	1,100	26 January 1918	scrapped 23 July 1945
Waterhen	Royal Australian Navy	W (Admiralty)	Destroyer	1,100	July 1918	sunk 30 June 1941
Waters	United States Navy	Wickes	Destroyer	1,190	8 August 1918	sold for scrap 10 May 1946
Watts	United States Navy	Fletcher	Destroyer	2,050	29 April 1944	decommissioned 1969, sold for scrap 1974
Wedderburn	United States Navy	Fletcher	Destroyer	2,050	9 March 1944	decommissioned 1969, sold for scrap 1972
Welles	United States Navy	Gleaves	Destroyer	1,630	16 August 1943	decommissioned 1946, scrapped 1969
Wells	Royal Navy	Town	Destroyer	1,190	10 April 1921	scrapped 24 July 1945
Wessex (D43)	Royal Navy	W (Admiralty)	Destroyer	1,100	11 May 1918	sunk 24 May 1940
Wessex (R78)	Royal Navy	W	Destroyer	1,710	11 May 1944	paid off January 1946
Westcott	Royal Navy	W (Admiralty)	Destroyer	1,100	12 April 1918	paid off June 1945
Westminster	Royal Navy	W (Admiralty)	Destroyer	1,100	18 April 1918	scrapped 4 March 1947
Whelp	Royal Navy	W	Destroyer	1,710	25 April 1944	paid off January 1946
Whipple	United States Navy	Clemson	Destroyer	1,215	23 April 1920	sold for scrap 30 September 1947
Whirlwind (D30)	Royal Navy	W (Admiralty)	Destroyer	1,100	15 December 1917	sunk 5 July 1940
Whirlwind (R87)	Royal Navy	W	Destroyer	1,710	30 August 1943	foundered 29 October 1974
Whitehall	Royal Navy	W (Admiralty)	Destroyer	1,140	9 July 1924	paid off May 1945
Whitley	Royal Navy	W (Admiralty)	Destroyer	1,100	14 October 1918	scuttled 19 May 1940
Whitshed	Royal Navy	W (Admiralty)	Destroyer	1,140	11 July 1919	scrapped April 1948
Wicher	Polish Navy	Wicher	Destroyer	1,400	13 July 1930	sunk 3 September 1939
Wickes	United States Navy	Fletcher	Destroyer	2,050	16 June 1943	decommissioned 1945, sunk as target 1974
Wild Swan	Royal Navy	W (Admiralty)	Destroyer	1,140	14 November 1919	sunk 17 June 1942
Wiley	United States Navy	Fletcher	Destroyer	2,050	22 February 1945	decommissioned 1946, sold for scrap 1970
Wilkes	United States Navy	Gleaves	Destroyer	1,630	22 April 1941	decommissioned 1946, scrapped 1972
Willard Keith	United States Navy	Allen M. Sumner	Destroyer	2,200	27 December 1944	to Colombia as Caldas 1972, scrapped 1977
William B. Preston	United States Navy	Clemson	Destroyer	1,215	23 August 1920	sold for scrap 6 November 1946
William C. Lawe	United States Navy	Gearing	Destroyer	2,616	18 December 1946	decommissioned 1983, sunk as target 1999
William D. Porter	United States Navy	Fletcher	Destroyer	2,050	6 July 1943	sunk 10 June 1945
William M. Wood	United States Navy	Gearing	Destroyer	2,616	24 November 1945	decommissioned 1976, sunk as target 1983
William R. Rush	United States Navy	Gearing	Destroyer	2,616	21 September 1945	to South Korea as Gangwon 1978, museum ship 2000, scrapped 2016
Williamson	United States Navy	Clemson	Destroyer	1,215	29 October 1920	sold for scrap 30 October 1946
Wilson	United States Navy	Benham	Destroyer	1,656	5 July 1939	scuttled after A-bomb test 1948
Wiltsie	United States Navy	Gearing	Destroyer	2,616	12 January 1946	to Pakistan as Tariq 1977, renamed as Nazim 1990, extant as of 2018
Winchelsea	Royal Navy	W (Admiralty)	Destroyer	1,100	15 December 1917	scrapped August 1945
Winchester	Royal Navy	W (Admiralty)	Destroyer	1,100	29 April 1918	scrapped March 1946
Windsor	Royal Navy	W (Admiralty)	Destroyer	1,100	28 August 1918	paid off 1945
Winslow	United States Navy	Porter	Destroyer	1,850	17 February 1937	scrapped 1959
Wishart	Royal Navy	W (Thornycroft)	Destroyer	1,140	June 1920	scrapped 20 March 1945
Witch	Royal Navy	W (Thornycroft)	Destroyer	1,140	March 1924	scrapped 12 July 1946
Witherington	Royal Navy	W (Admiralty)	Destroyer	1,140	10 October 1919	scrapped 20 March 1947
Witek	United States Navy	Gearing	Destroyer	2,616	23 April 1946	decommissioned 1968, sunk as target 1969
Witte de With	Royal Netherlands Navy	Admiralen	Destroyer	1,316	20 February 1930	scuttled 2 March 1942
Wivern	Royal Navy	W (Admiralty)	Destroyer	1,140	23 December 1919	scrapped 18 February 1947
Wizard	Royal Navy	W	Destroyer	1,710	30 March 1944	scrapped 1967
Wolfhound	Royal Navy	W (Admiralty)	Destroyer	1,100	27 April 1918	scrapped February 1948
Wolsey	Royal Navy	W (Thornycroft)	Destroyer	1,120	14 May 1918	scrapped 4 March 1947
Wolverine	Royal Navy	W (Admiralty)	Destroyer	1,140	27 February 1920	scrapped September 1946
Woodworth	United States Navy	Benson	Destroyer	1,620	30 April 1942	to Italy 1951, scrapped 1971
Woolsey	United States Navy	Gleaves	Destroyer	1,630	7 May 1941	decommissioned 1947, scrapped 1974
Woolston	Royal Navy	W (Thornycroft)	Destroyer	1,120	28 June 1918	scrapped 18 February 1947
Worden	United States Navy	Farragut	Destroyer	1,365	15 January 1935	sunk 12 January 1943
Wrangel	Swedish Navy	Wrangel	Destroyer	465	4 May 1918	paid off 13 June 1947, sunk 1960
Wrangler	Royal Navy	W	Destroyer	1,710	14 July 1944	to South Africa after war
Wren	United States Navy	Fletcher	Destroyer	2,050	20 May 1944	decommissioned 1963, sold for scrap 1975
Wren	Royal Navy	W (Admiralty)	Destroyer	1,140	23 January 1923	sunk 27 July 1940
Wrestler	Royal Navy	W (Admiralty)	Destroyer	1,100	15 May 1918	mined 6 June 1944, scrapped July 1944
Wryneck	Royal Navy	W (Admiralty)	Destroyer	1,100	11 November 1918	sunk 27 April 1941
Yadake	Imperial Japanese Navy	Tachibana	Destroyer	1,288	Never commissioned	construction stopped 17 April 1945, launched 1 May 1945, converted to breakwater 1948
Yaezakura	Imperial Japanese Navy	Tachibana	Destroyer	1,288	Never commissioned	launched 17 March 1945, sunk 18 July 1945
Yakov Sverdlov	Soviet Navy	Novik	Destroyer	1,260	9 September 1913	sunk 28 August 1941
Yamagumo	Imperial Japanese Navy	Asashio	Destroyer	2,370	15 January 1938	sunk 25 October 1944
Yamakaze	Imperial Japanese Navy	Shiratsuyu	Destroyer	1,685	30 June 1937	sunk 25 June 1942
Yanagi (1917)	Imperial Japanese Navy	Momo	Destroyer	835	5 May 1917	decommissioned 1 April 1940 and converted to training hulk, scrapped 1947
Yanagi (1944)	Imperial Japanese Navy	Matsu	Destroyer	1,262	8 January 1945	ran aground 14 July 1945, scrapped 1 April 1947
Yarnall	United States Navy	Fletcher	Destroyer	2,050	30 December 1943	to Taiwan as Kun Yang 1968, sunk as target 1999
Yayoi	Imperial Japanese Navy	Mutsuki	Destroyer	1,315	28 August 1926	sunk 11 September 1942
Yoizuki	Imperial Japanese Navy	Akizuki	Destroyer	2,700	31 January 1945	to Republic of China as Fen Yang 29 August 1947, scrapped 1963
Yomogi	Imperial Japanese Navy	Momi	Destroyer	850	19 August 1922	converted to patrol boat Dai-38-Gō shōkaitei 1 April 1940, sunk 25 November 1944
Young	United States Navy	Fletcher	Destroyer	2,050	31 July 1943	decommissioned 1947, sunk as target 1970
Yūdachi	Imperial Japanese Navy	Shiratsuyu	Destroyer	1,685	7 January 1937	sunk 13 November 1942
Yūgiri	Imperial Japanese Navy	Ayanami	Destroyer	1,750	3 December 1930	sunk 25 November 1943
Yūgumo	Imperial Japanese Navy	Yūgumo	Destroyer	2,077	5 December 1941	sunk 6 October 1943
Yūgure	Imperial Japanese Navy	Hatsuharu	Destroyer	1,802	30 March 1935	sunk 20 July 1943
Yukikaze	Imperial Japanese Navy	Kagerō	Destroyer	2,032	20 January 1940	to Republic of China 6 July 1947 as Tan Yang, scrapped 1970
Yūzuki	Imperial Japanese Navy	Mutsuki	Destroyer	1,315	25 July 1927	sunk 12 December 1944
Z1 Leberecht Maass	Kriegsmarine	Type 1934	Destroyer	2,223	14 January 1937	sunk 22 February 1940
Z2 Georg Thiele	Kriegsmarine	Type 1934	Destroyer	2,223	27 February 1937	sunk 13 April 1940
Z3 Max Schultz	Kriegsmarine	Type 1934	Destroyer	2,223	8 April 1937	sunk 22 February 1940
Z4 Richard Beitzen	Kriegsmarine	Type 1934	Destroyer	2,223	13 May 1937	ceded to UK 14 May 1945, scrapped 10 January 1949
Z5 Paul Jacobi	Kriegsmarine	Type 1934A	Destroyer	2,171	29 June 1937	ceded to UK May 1945, to France as Desaix 4 February 1946, sold for scrap June 1954
Z6 Theodor Riedel	Kriegsmarine	Type 1934A	Destroyer	2,171	2 July 1937	ceded to UK late 1945, to France as Kleber 4 February 1946, scrapped 1958
Z7 Hermann Schoemann	Kriegsmarine	Type 1934A	Destroyer	2,171	9 September 1937	sunk 2 May 1942
Z8 Bruno Heinemann	Kriegsmarine	Type 1934A	Destroyer	2,171	8 January 1938	sunk 25 January 1942
Z9 Wolfgang Zenker	Kriegsmarine	Type 1934A	Destroyer	2,171	2 July 1938	scuttled 13 April 1940
Z10 Hans Lody	Kriegsmarine	Type 1934A	Destroyer	2,171	13 September 1938	ceded to UK late 1945, scrapped 17 July 1949
Z11 Bernd von Arnim	Kriegsmarine	Type 1934A	Destroyer	2,171	6 December 1938	scuttled 13 April 1940
Z12 Erich Giese	Kriegsmarine	Type 1934A	Destroyer	2,171	4 March 1939	sunk 13 April 1940
Z13 Erich Koellner	Kriegsmarine	Type 1934A	Destroyer	2,171	28 March 1939	sunk 13 April 1940
Z14 Friedrich Ihn	Kriegsmarine	Type 1934A	Destroyer	2,239	9 April 1938	to USSR as Prytky November 1945, scrapped 1952
Z15 Erich Steinbrinck	Kriegsmarine	Type 1934A	Destroyer	2,239	8 June 1938	to USSR as Pylky 5 November 1945, scrapped 1958
Z16 Friedrich Eckoldt	Kriegsmarine	Type 1934A	Destroyer	2,239	28 July 1938	sunk 31 December 1942
Z17 Diether von Roeder	Kriegsmarine	Type 1936	Destroyer	2,411	29 August 1938	sunk 13 April 1940
Z18 Hans Lüdemann	Kriegsmarine	Type 1936	Destroyer	2,411	8 October 1938	sunk 13 April 1940
Z19 Hermann Künne	Kriegsmarine	Type 1936	Destroyer	2,411	12 January 1939	sunk 13 April 1940
Z20 Karl Galster	Kriegsmarine	Type 1936	Destroyer	2,411	21 March 1939	to USSR as Prochny 6 February 1946, scrapped 1958
Z21 Wilhelm Heidkamp	Kriegsmarine	Type 1936	Destroyer	2,411	20 June 1939	sunk 10 April 1940
Z22 Anton Schmitt	Kriegsmarine	Type 1936	Destroyer	2,411	24 September 1939	sunk 10 April 1940
Z23	Kriegsmarine	Type 1936A ("Narvik")	Destroyer	2,603	15 September 1940	scuttled 21 August 1944, raised by France 1945, scrapped 1951
Z24	Kriegsmarine	Type 1936A ("Narvik")	Destroyer	2,603	26 October 1940	sunk 25 August 1944
Z25	Kriegsmarine	Type 1936A ("Narvik")	Destroyer	2,543	30 November 1940	ceded to UK late 1945, to France as Hoche 4 February 1946, scrapped 1961
Z26	Kriegsmarine	Type 1936A ("Narvik")	Destroyer	2,543	11 January 1941	sunk 29 March 1942
Z27	Kriegsmarine	Type 1936A ("Narvik")	Destroyer	2,543	26 February 1941	sunk 28 December 1943
Z28	Kriegsmarine	Type 1936A ("Narvik")	Destroyer	2,596	9 August 1941	sunk 6 March 1945
Z29	Kriegsmarine	Type 1936A ("Narvik")	Destroyer	2,657	25 June 1941	to United States late 1945, scuttled 10 June 1946
Z30	Kriegsmarine	Type 1936A ("Narvik")	Destroyer	2,657	15 November 1941	to Norway 15 July 1945, ceded to UK late 1945, sold for scrap 9 September 1948
Z31	Kriegsmarine	Type 1936A Mob	Destroyer	2,603	11 April 1942	to France 2 February 1946 as Marceau, scrapped early 1960s
Z32	Kriegsmarine	Type 1936A Mob	Destroyer	2,645	15 September 1942	destroyed 9 June 1944
Z33	Kriegsmarine	Type 1936A Mob	Destroyer	2,657	6 February 1943	to USSR 2 January 1946 as Provorny, scrapped 1962
Z34	Kriegsmarine	Type 1936A Mob	Destroyer	2,657	5 June 1943	to United States late 1945, scuttled 26 March 1946
Z35	Kriegsmarine	Type 1936B	Destroyer	2,519	22 September 1943	sunk 12 December 1944
Z36	Kriegsmarine	Type 1936B	Destroyer	2,519	19 February 1944	sunk 12 December 1944
Z37	Kriegsmarine	Type 1936A Mob	Destroyer	2,657	16 July 1943	scuttled 24 August 1944, scrapped 1949
Z38	Kriegsmarine	Type 1936A Mob	Destroyer	3,083	20 March 1943	to United Kingdom as Nonsuch September 1945, sold for scrap 8 November 1949
Z39	Kriegsmarine	Type 1936A Mob	Destroyer	2,519	21 August 1943	to United States as DD-939 14 September 1945, to France as Q-128 January 1948, scrapped 1964
Z43	Kriegsmarine	Type 1936B	Destroyer	2,519	31 May 1944	severely damaged by mine 10 April 1945, scuttled 3 May 1945
Z44	Kriegsmarine	Type 1936B	Destroyer	2,519	Never commissioned	launched 20 January 1944, sunk by air attack 29 July 1944, shortly before the planned commission; scrapped April 1948-February 1949
Z45	Kriegsmarine	Type 1936B	Destroyer	2,519	Never commissioned	construction incomplete, scrapped 1946
Z46	Kriegsmarine	Type 1936C	Destroyer	2,594	Never commissioned	construction incomplete, blown up 1945
Z47	Kriegsmarine	Type 1936C	Destroyer	2,594	Never commissioned	construction incomplete, blown up 1945
Z51	Kriegsmarine	Type 1942	Destroyer	1,982	Never commissioned	launched 2 October 1944, sunk 21 March 1945, scrapped 17 February 1948
Zafer	Turkish Naval Forces	Tinaztepe	Destroyer	1,206	6 June 1932	decommissioned February 1954
Zagreb	Royal Yugoslav Navy	Beograd	Destroyer	1,190	August 1939	scuttled 17 April 1941
Zane	United States Navy	Clemson	Destroyer minesweeper	1,215	15 February 1921	sold for scrap 3 March 1947
Zambesi	Royal Navy	Z	Destroyer	1,710	18 July 1944	scrapped 12 February 1959
Zealous	Royal Navy	Z	Destroyer	1,710	9 October 1944	to Israel as INS Eilat 15 July 1955, sunk 21 October 1967
Zebra	Royal Navy	Z	Destroyer	1,710	13 October 1944	scrapped 1954
Zeffiro	Regia Marina	Turbine	Destroyer	1,070	15 May 1928	sunk 5 July 1940
Zellars	United States Navy	Allen M. Sumner	Destroyer	2,200	25 October 1944	to Iran as Babr 1973, decommissioned 1994
Zenith	Royal Navy	Z	Destroyer	1,710	22 December 1944	to Egypt as El Fateh 1955, as of September 2017 still used as training vessel
Zephyr	Royal Navy	Z	Destroyer	1,710	6 September 1944	paid off 1954, scrapped 12 February 1959
Zest	Royal Navy	Z	Destroyer	1,710	12 July 1944	paid off July 1968, scrapped 1970
ZH1	Kriegsmarine	Gerard Callenburgh	Destroyer	1,604	11 October 1942	scuttled 9 June 1944
Zheleznyakov	Soviet Navy	Fidonisy	Destroyer	1,460	10 June 1925	to Bulgaria 18 December 1947, returned to Soviet Union 15 September 1949, scrapped 1957
ZN4	Kriegsmarine	Ålesund	Destroyer	1,220	Never commissioned	laid down April 1939 as an unnamed Norwegian destroyer, renamed as TA7 1941, launched 29 May 1941, wrecked by sabotage 27 September 1944
ZN5	Kriegsmarine	Ålesund	Destroyer	1,220	Never commissioned	laid down April 1939 as an unnamed Norwegian destroyer, renamed as TA8 1941, launched 30 June 1943, sunk 23 February 1945, raised post-war by Norway, renamed as Ålesund, scrapped 1956
Zodiac	Royal Navy	Z	Destroyer	1,710	23 October 1944	to Israel as INS Yaffo 15 July 1955, paid off 1972 and scrapped
Zulu	Royal Navy	Tribal	Destroyer	1,891	6 September 1938	sunk 14 September 1942
