= Japanese destroyer Hatsuume =

WWII-era Japanese escort destroyer

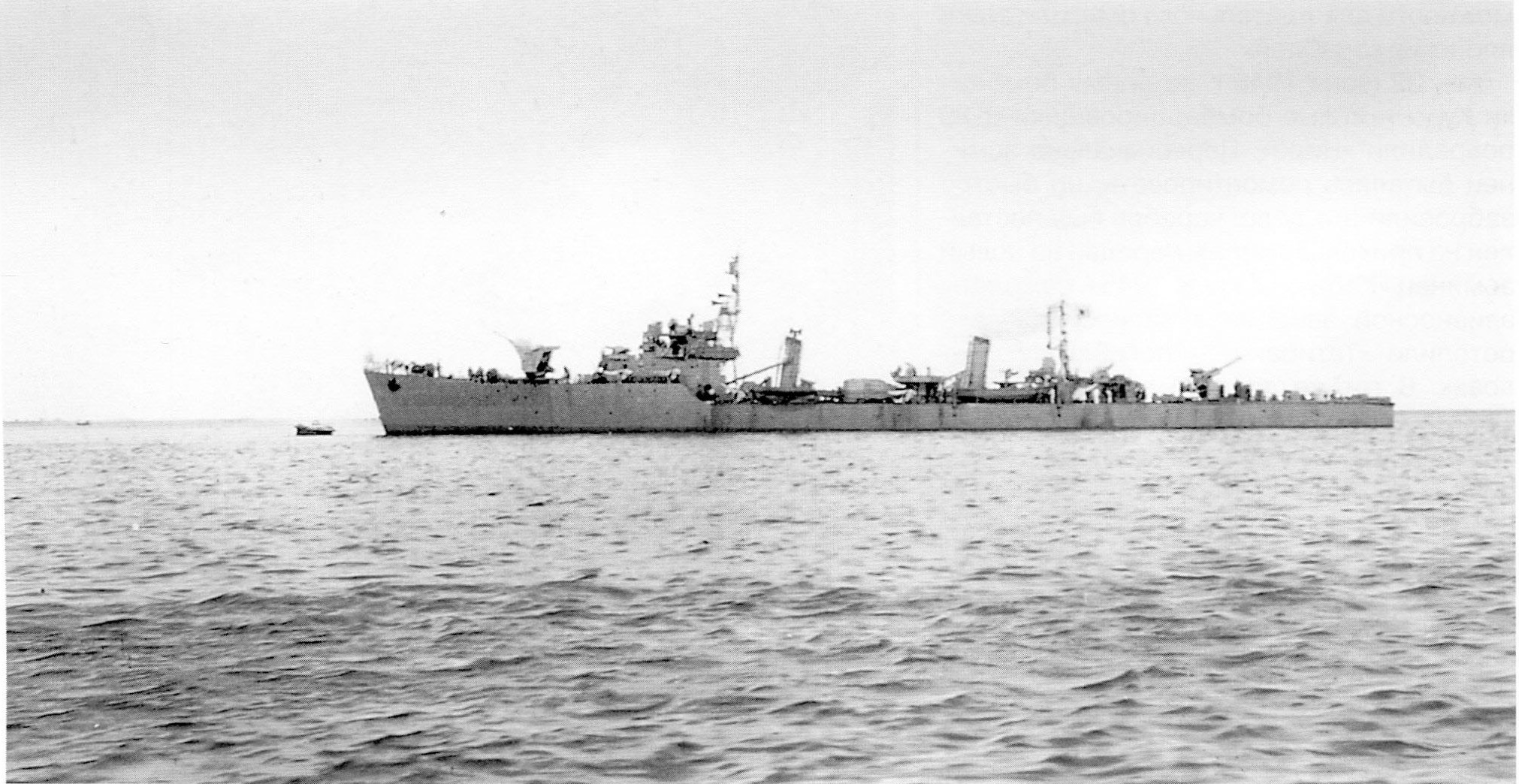
- Sister ship Nire in January or February 1945

History

Empire of Japan
- Name: Hatsuume
- Namesake: early-blooming plum
- Ordered: 1944
- Builder: Maizuru Naval Arsenal
- Laid down: 8 December 1944
- Launched: 25 April 1945
- Completed: 18 June 1945
- Stricken: 5 October 1945
- Fate: Turned over to the Republic of China Navy, 6 July 1947

Republic of China
- Name: ROCS Xin Yang
- Acquired: 6 July 1947
- Stricken: December 1961
- Fate: Scrapped, 1960s

General characteristics
- Class & type: Tachibana sub-class of the Matsu-class escort destroyer
- Displacement: 1,309 t (1,288 long tons) (standard)
- Length: 100 m (328 ft 1 in) (o/a)
- Beam: 9.35 m (30 ft 8 in)
- Draft: 3.37 m (11 ft 1 in)
- Installed power: 2 × water-tube boilers; 19,000 shp (14,000 kW)
- Propulsion: 2 shafts, 2 × geared steam turbines
- Speed: 27.8 knots (51.5 km/h; 32.0 mph)
- Range: 4,680 nmi (8,670 km; 5,390 mi) at 16 knots (30 km/h; 18 mph)
- Sensors & processing systems: 1 × Type 22 search radar; 1 × Type 13 early-warning radar
- Armament: 1 × twin, 1 × single 127 mm (5 in) DP guns; 4 × triple, 13 × single 25 mm (1 in) AA guns; 1 × quadruple 610 mm (24 in) torpedo tubes; 2 × rails, 2 × throwers for 60 depth charges

Hatsuume (初梅; "Early-blooming Plum") was one of 23 escort destroyers of the Tachibana sub-class of the Matsu class built for the Imperial Japanese Navy during the final stages of World War II. Damaged by a naval mine shortly after her completion in June 1945, the ship was surrendered to the Allies at the end of the war and used to repatriate Japanese troops until 1947. Mid-year the destroyer was turned over to the Republic of China; renamed Xin Yang she played a minor role in the Chinese Civil War and remained in service until the 1960s when she was scrapped.

== Design and description ==
The Tachibana sub-class was a simplified version of the preceding Matsu class to make them even more suited for mass production. The ships measured 100 meters (328 ft 1 in) long overall, with a beam of 9.35 meters (30 ft 8 in) and a draft of 3.37 meters (11 ft 1 in). They displaced 1,309 metric tons (1,288 long tons) at standard load and 1,554 metric tons (1,529 long tons) at deep load. The ships had two Kampon geared steam turbines, each driving one propeller shaft, using steam provided by two Kampon water-tube boilers. The turbines were rated at a total of 19,000 shaft horsepower (14,000 kW) for a speed of 27.8 knots (51.5 km/h; 32.0 mph). The Tachibanas had a range of 4,680 nautical miles (8,670 km; 5,390 mi) at 16 knots (30 km/h; 18 mph).

The main armament of the Tachibana sub-class consisted of three Type 89 127-millimeter (5 in) dual-purpose guns in one twin-gun mount aft and one single mount forward of the superstructure. The single mount was partially protected against spray by a gun shield. The accuracy of the Type 89 guns was severely reduced against aircraft because no high-angle gunnery director was fitted. They carried a total of 25 Type 96 25-millimeter (1 in) anti-aircraft guns in 4 triple and 13 single mounts. The Tachibanas were equipped with Type 13 early-warning and Type 22 surface-search radars. The ships were also armed with a single rotating quadruple mount amidships for 610-millimeter (24 in) torpedoes. They could deliver their 60 depth charges via two stern rails and two throwers.

== Construction and service ==
Hatsuume (early-blooming plum) was ordered in Fiscal Year 1944 under the Wartime Naval Armaments Supplement Program and she was laid down at Maizuru Naval Arsenal on 8 December 1944. The ship was launched on 25 April 1945 and completed on 18 June. The destroyer was assigned to the 11th Destroyer Squadron of the Combined Fleet that same day for working up. Hatsuume was damaged when she struck a naval mine near Maizuru eight days later that killed four crewmen. The unrepaired ship was transferred to the Maizuru Naval District on 15 July.

She was turned over to Allied forces at Maizuru at the time of the surrender of Japan on 2 September and was stricken from the navy list on 5 October. The destroyer was disarmed and used to repatriate Japanese personnel in 1945–1947 after repairs. Hatsuume was turned over to the Republic of China on 6 July of the latter year and was renamed Xin Yang. She was rearmed with two 120 mm (4.7 in), three 57 mm (2.2 in), a pair of 40 mm (1.6 in) and four 20 mm (0.8 in) guns in March 1948 and participated in combat against Chinese Communist forces. Six years later the ship was refitted using components from her sister Hua Yang and rearmed with American weapons: two single mounts for 5 in (127 mm) dual-purpose guns and an anti-aircraft suite of seven 40 mm Bofors and six 20 mm Oerlikon guns. Xin Yang was stricken from the navy list in December 1961 and subsequently scrapped.

== Bibliography ==
- Dodson, Aidan & Cant, Serena (2020). Spoils of War: The Fate of Enemy Fleets after Two World Wars. Barnsley, UK: Seaforth Publishing. ISBN 978-1-5267-4198-1.
- Jentschura, Hansgeorg; Jung, Dieter & Mickel, Peter (1977). Warships of the Imperial Japanese Navy, 1869–1945. Annapolis, Maryland: United States Naval Institute. ISBN 0-87021-893-X.
- Nevitt, Allyn D. (1998). "IJN Hatsuume: Tabular Record of Movement". www.combinedfleet.com.
- Stille, Mark (2013). Imperial Japanese Navy Destroyers 1919–45 (2): Asahio to Tachibana Classes. Botley, UK: Osprey Publishing. ISBN 978-1-84908-987-6.
- Sturton, Ian (1980). "Japan". In Chesneau, Roger (ed.). Conway's All the World's Fighting Ships 1922–1946. Greenwich, UK: Conway Maritime Press. ISBN 0-85177-146-7.
- Whitley, M. J. (1988). Destroyers of World War Two: An International Encyclopedia. Annapolis, Maryland: Naval Institute Press. ISBN 0-87021-326-1.
