= Matsu-class destroyer =

Class of Imperial Japanese Navy destroyer

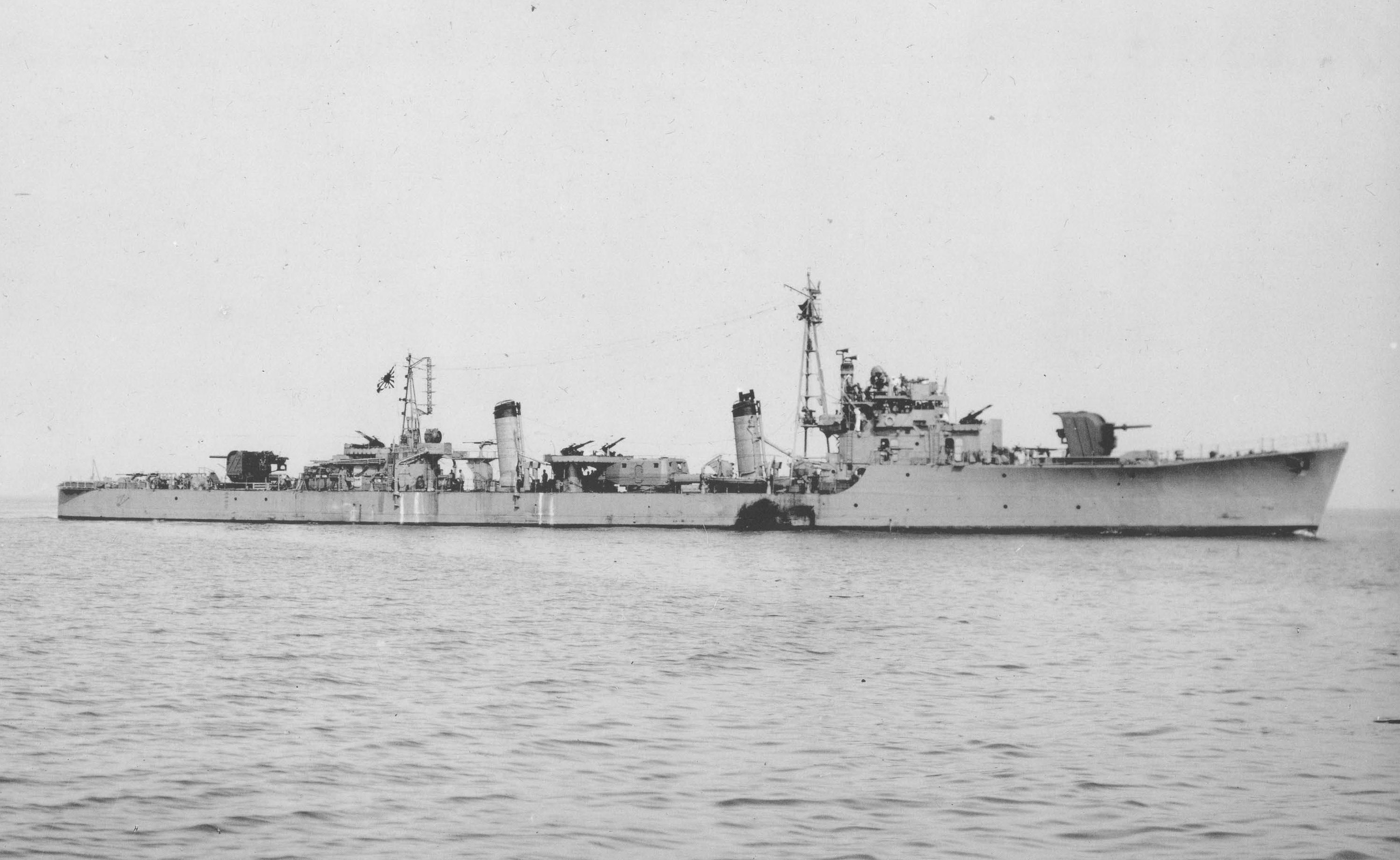
- Momi, one of the members of this class

Class overview
- Name: Matsu class
- Builders: Yokosuka Naval Arsenal (14); Maizuru Naval Arsenal (10); Fujinagata Shipyards (7); Kawasaki Dockyard Co. (1)
- Operators: Imperial Japanese Navy; Republic of China Navy; Soviet Navy; Japan Maritime Self-Defense Force
- Preceded by: Ōtori-class torpedo boat; Akizuki class
- Subclasses: Tachibana class
- Built: 1943–1945
- In commission: 1944–1971
- Planned: 42 (1943, Ship #5481-5522), 32 (1944, Ship #4801-4832), 80 (1945, Kai-Tachibana class)
- Completed: 18 (Matsu class), 14 (Tachibana class)
- Cancelled: 122
- Lost: 10
- Retired: 22 + 1 (JDS Wakaba)

General characteristics Matsu class
- Displacement: 1,260 tons standard; 1,530 tons in battle condition
- Length: 100.0 m (328 ft 1 in) overall, 92.15 m (302 ft 4 in) waterline
- Beam: 9.35 m (30 ft 8 in)
- Draft: 3.30 m (10 ft 10 in)
- Propulsion: 2 × Kampon water tube boilers, 2 × Kampon impulse geared turbines, 19,000 shp (14 MW); 2 shafts
- Speed: 27.8 knots (32.0 mph; 51.5 km/h)
- Range: 3,500 nmi (6,500 km) at 18 kn (21 mph; 33 km/h)
- Complement: 211
- Sensors & processing systems: 1 × Type 93 active sonar, 1 × Type 93 hydrophone
- Electronic warfare & decoys: 1 × 22-Gō surface search radar (wavelength 10 cm)
- Armament: (Matsu, April 1944); 3 × 127 mm (5.0 in) L/40 Type 89 AA guns (1×2, 1×1); 24 × 25 mm (1") Type 96 AA guns (4×3, 12×1); 4 × 610 mm (24 in) Type 92 torpedo tubes (1×4); 4 × Type 93 torpedoes; 4 depth charge throwers; 36 × Type 2 depth charges; (Take, March 1945); 3 × 127 mm (5.0 in) L/40 AA guns (1×2, 1×1); 39 × 25 mm (1") Type 96 AA guns (4×3, 27×1); 4 × 610 mm (24 in) Type 92 torpedo tubes (1×4); 4 × Type 93 torpedoes; 4 depth charge throwers; 48 × Type 2 depth charges

General characteristics Tachibana class
- Displacement: 1,350 tons standard; 1,640 tons in battle condition
- Length: 100.0 m (328 ft 1 in) overall, 92.15 m (302 ft 4 in) waterline
- Beam: 9.35 m (30 ft 8 in)
- Draft: 3.41 m (11 ft 2 in)
- Propulsion: 2 × Kampon water tube boilers, 2 × Kampon impulse geared turbines, 19,000 shp (14 MW); 2 shafts
- Speed: 27.3 knots (31.4 mph; 50.6 km/h)
- Sensors & processing systems: 1 × Type 3 active sonar, 1 × Type 4 hydrophone
- Electronic warfare & decoys: 1 × 22-Gō surface search radar (wavelength 10 cm), 1 × 13-Gō early warning radar (wavelength 2 m)
- Armament: (Tachibana, January 1945); 3 × 127 mm (5.0 in) L/40 Type 89 AA guns (1×2, 1×1); 25 × 25 mm (1") AA guns (4×3, 13×1); 4 × 610 mm (24 in) Type 92 torpedo tubes (1×4); 4 × Type 93 torpedoes; 48 × Type 2 depth charges

General characteristics Kaiten carrier
- Armament: (Take, 25 June 1945); 3 × 127 mm (5.0 in) L/40 Type 89 AA guns (1×2, 1×1); 39 × 25 mm (1") AA guns (4×3, 27×1); 4 × 610 mm (24 in) Type 92 torpedo tubes (1×4); 4 × Type 93 torpedoes; 48-60 × Type 2 depth charges; 1 × manned torpedo Kaiten Type 1

The Matsu-class destroyers (松型駆逐艦, Matsu-gata kuchikukan) were a class of destroyer built for the Imperial Japanese Navy (IJN) in the late stages of World War II. The class was also designated the Type-D Destroyer (丁型駆逐艦, Tei-gata kuchikukan). Although sometimes termed Destroyer escorts, they were larger and more capable than contemporary United States Navy destroyer escorts or the Imperial Japanese Navy kaibōkan vessels.

== Background ==
Even by 1942, the Imperial Japanese Navy General Staff realized that attrition of its destroyer force was not sustainable. There was a growing need for a simplified design which could be quickly mass-produced, and which could serve primarily as convoy escorts and as destroyer-transports in front-line locations, but would still be capable of working with the fleet if necessary. Emphasis was placed on anti-aircraft guns and anti-submarine weapons, and radar, as operations against surface targets was deemed unlikely. Forty-two vessels were ordered and work began in August 1943.

In the middle of 1944, the orders for twenty-four of these vessels were replaced with a further-simplified design, designated the Tachibana-class destroyer (橘型駆逐艦, Tachibana-gata kuchikukan) or Modified Type-D Destroyer (改丁型駆逐艦, Kai Tei-gata kuchikukan). The Tachibana-class had straight lines and a modular construction to facilitate mass-production. The Imperial Japanese Navy had plans to build another hundred and twelve Tachibana-class vessels, but only fourteen were completed before construction was cancelled, with resources diverted to "special-attack units".

== Design and description ==
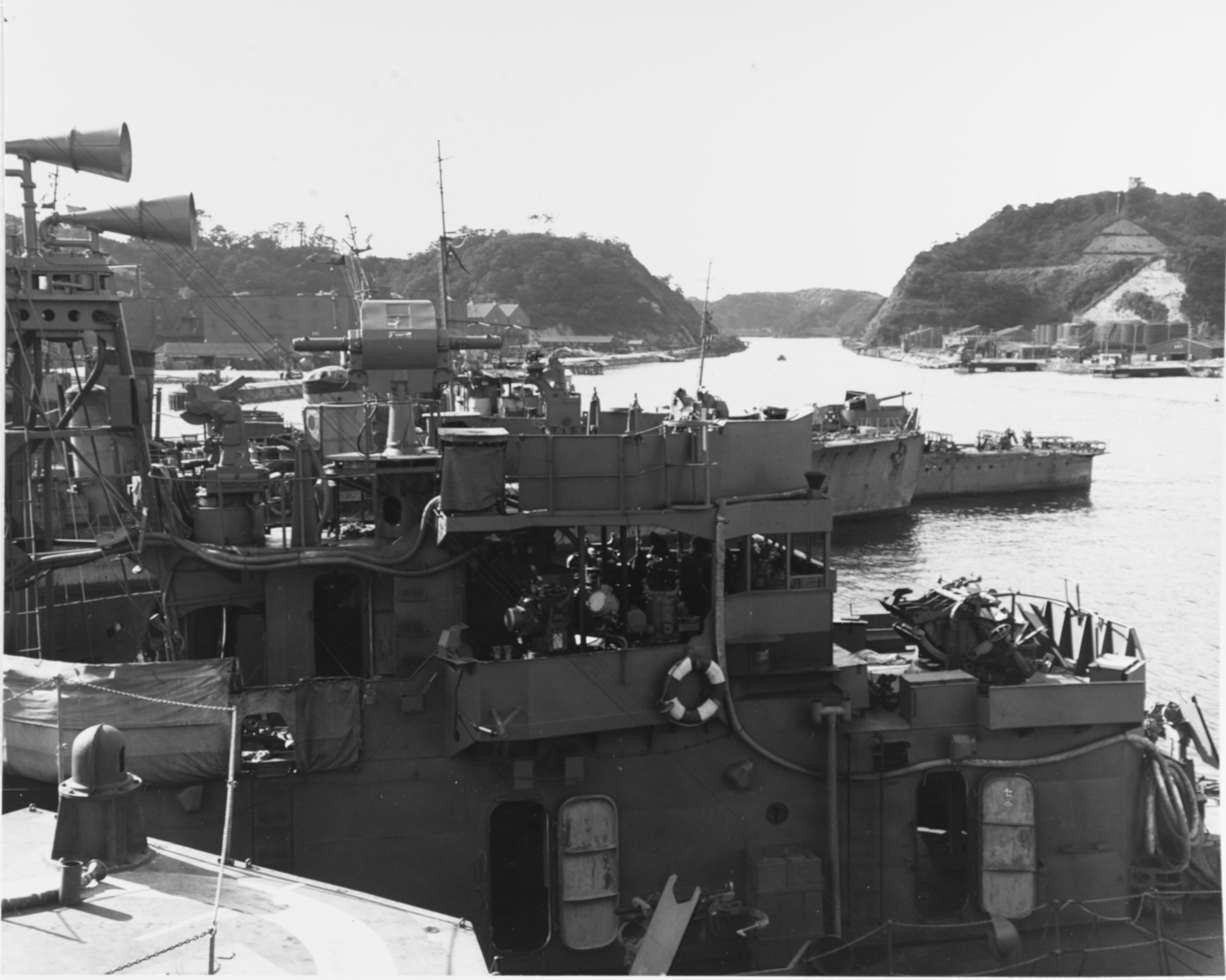
The bridge of a Tachibana-class destroyer at Yokosuka, September 1945

Designed for ease of production, the Matsu class was smaller, slower and more lightly armed than previous destroyers as the IJN intended them for second-line duties like escorting convoys, releasing the larger ships for missions with the fleet. The ships measured 100 meters (328 ft 1 in) long overall, with a beam of 9.35 meters (30 ft 8 in) and a draft of 3.3 meters (10 ft 10 in). Their crew numbered 210 officers and enlisted men. They displaced 1,282 metric tons (1,262 long tons) at standard load and 1,554 metric tons (1,529 long tons) at deep load. The ships had two Kampon geared steam turbines, each driving one propeller shaft, using steam provided by two Kampon water-tube boilers. The turbines were rated at a total of 19,000 shaft horsepower (14,000 kW) for a speed of 27.8 knots (51.5 km/h; 32.0 mph). The Matsus had a range of 4,680 nautical miles (8,670 km; 5,390 mi) at 16 knots (30 km/h; 18 mph).

The main armament of the Matsu-class ships consisted of three 127-millimeter (5 in) Type 89 dual-purpose guns in one twin-gun mount aft and one single mount forward of the superstructure. The single mount was partially protected against spray by a gun shield. The accuracy of the Type 89 guns was severely reduced against aircraft because no high-angle gunnery director was fitted. The ships carried a total of 20 Type 96 25-millimeter (1 in) anti-aircraft guns in four triple and eight single mounts. The Matsus were equipped with a Type 22 surface-search radar. The ships were also armed with a single rotating quadruple mount amidships for 610-millimeter (24 in) torpedoes. They could deliver their 36 depth charges via two stern rails and two throwers.

The early ships of the class probably were not initially fitted with a Type 13 early-warning radar. The radar and five additional 25 mm guns on single mounts were generally installed in late 1944.

The Tachibana-class, entering service in 1945, had the same armament as the Matsu-class, but initially with 13 single-mount Type 96s instead of eight. This was later increased to as many as 19. Only one vessel, Take, was modified to launch a single kaiten manned torpedo from her stern, although there were plans to convert another 11 to this configuration just before the war came to an end.

== Operational history ==
Matsu-class destroyers were assigned to Destroyer Divisions 43, 52, and 53. Few Matsu-class units saw extensive service beyond Japanese home waters, and none of the Tachibana-class did.

== Matsu and Tachibana classes comparison ==
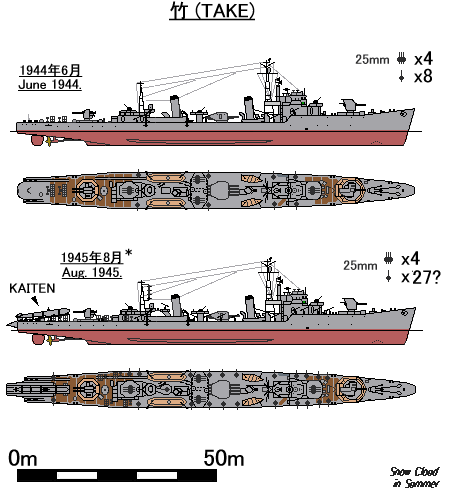
Matsu-class destroyer Take with Kaiten. Lower illustration is Take in August 1945.

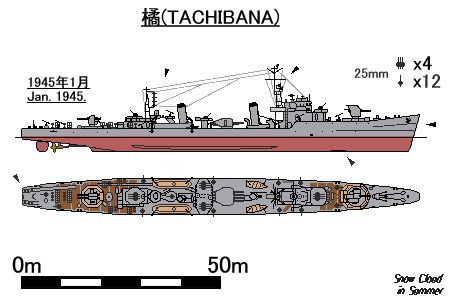
Tachibana. Arrows are difference to Matsu class.

Comparison of Matsu and Tachibana classes
Property	Matsu class	Tachibana class
Project number	F55	F55B
Building method	Ordinary	Modular design
Main materials	High-Tensile Strength steel (upper deck only) and Carbon steel	Carbon steel only
Hull	Double bottom	Single bottom
Bow	Knuckle bow	Straight bow
Stern	Destroyer stern	Transom stern
Bilge Keel	Boxy (Solid)	Flat board
Active sonar	Type 93	Type 3
Hydrophone	Type 93	Type 4
Turbines	high-pressure, intermediate-pressure, low-pressure, and cruising	high-pressure and low-pressure

== Ships of the classes ==
Forty-two vessels were ordered in Fiscal Year 1943 under the Modified 5th Naval Armaments Supplement Programme as #5481-#5522. Eighteen of these were completed to the original Matsu design, but the other twenty-four were altered to a modified (simplified) design which became known as the Tachibana class. Eight of this batch were completed to that design, while orders for sixteen were subsequently cancelled (of which eleven had not been laid down).

Another thirty-two vessels were authorised in Fiscal Year 1944 under the Wartime Naval Armaments Supplement Programme as #4801-#4832, all to the Tachibana design. Six of this batch were completed to that design, while another four were ordered and laid down but were subsequently cancelled on 17 April 1945; the remaining twenty-two were never ordered.

A further eighty vessels were projected in Fiscal Year 1945 to a further modification of the design, known as the Kai-Tachibana class, but no orders were placed before the end of the war brought an end to the programme.

Construction data
Ship name	Ship #	Kanji & translation	Class	Builder	Laid down	Launched	Completed	Fate
Matsu	5481	松 (Pine tree)	Matsu	Maizuru Naval Arsenal	8 August 1943	3 February 1944	28 April 1944	Sunk on 4 August 1944 by US Navy ships 50 miles northwest of Chichijima (Ogasawara Islands)
Take	5482	竹 (Bamboo)	Matsu	Yokosuka Naval Arsenal	15 October 1943	28 March 1944	16 June 1944	Surrendered to United Kingdom on 16 July 1947 at Singapore, scrapped
Ume	5483	梅 (Japanese apricot)	Matsu	Fujinagata Shipyards	25 January 1944	24 April 1944	28 June 1944	Sunk 31 January 1945 by US Army Air Force aircraft 20 miles south of Taiwan
Momo	5484	桃 (Peach)	Matsu	Maizuru Naval Arsenal	5 November 1943	25 March 1944	10 June 1944	Sunk 15 December 1944 by US Navy submarine USS Hawkbill 140 miles south-west of m.Bolinao (o-in Luzon)
Kuwa	5485	桑 (Mulberry)	Matsu	Fujinagata Shipyards	20 December 1943	25 May 1944	15 July 1944	Sunk 3 December 1944 by US Navy destroyers during the Battle of Ormoc Bay (o-in Luzon)
Kiri	5486	桐 (Paulownia)	Matsu	Yokosuka Naval Arsenal	1 February 1944	27 May 1944	14 August 1944	Delivered to Soviet Union on 29 July 1947 at Nakhodka, renamed Vozrozhdionny (Возрождённый), converted to target ship TsL-25 (1949) and depot ship PM-65 (1957), scrapped in 1969.
Sugi	5487	杉 (Cedar)	Matsu	Fujinagata Shipyards	25 February 1944	3 July 1944	25 August 1944	Surrendered at Kure. Handed over to the Republic of China on 6 July 1947 in Shanghai, called ROCN Hui Yang. Removed from the ROC Navy list 11 November 1954 and scrapped.
Maki	5488	槇 (Podocarpaceae)	Matsu	Maizuru Naval Arsenal	19 February 1944	10 June 1944	10 August 1944	Surrendered to United Kingdom on 14 August 1947 at Singapore, scrapped 1947
Momi	5489	樅 (Abies firma)	Matsu	Yokosuka Naval Arsenal	1 February 1944	16 June 1944	3 September 1944	Sunk on 5 January 1945 by US Navy carrier aircraft 28 miles west-southwest of Manila
Kashi	5490	樫 (Live oak)	Matsu	Fujinagata Shipyards	5 May 1944	13 August 1944	30 September 1944	Surrendered to United States on 7 August 1947 at Sasebo, scrapped 20 March 1948
Yaezakura	5491	八重櫻 (Prunus verecunda Antiqua)	Tachibana	Yokosuka Naval Arsenal	18 December 1944	17 March 1945	—N/a	Discontinued on 23 June 1945 (60%). Sunk 18 July 1945
Kaya	5492	榧 (Torreya nucifera)	Matsu	Maizuru Naval Arsenal	10 April 1944	30 July 1944	30 September 1944	Transferred to the Soviet Union 5 July 1947 in Nakhodka, It was called "Volevoy", converted to target ship "TSL-23" (1949), then to the floating heater "OT-61" (1958); excluded from the lists of the fleet on 1 August 1959 and scrapped.
Nara	5493	楢 (Oak)	Matsu	Fujinagata Shipyards	10 June 1944	12 October 1944	26 November 1944	Scrapped 1 July 1948
Yadake	5494	矢竹 (Arrow bamboo)	Tachibana	Yokosuka Naval Arsenal	2 January 1945	1 May 1945	—N/a	Construction stopped 17 April 1945. Launched to empty the dock. Converted to breakwater, 1948
Kuzu or Madake	5495	葛 (Kudzu) or 真竹 (Phyllostachys bambusoides)	Tachibana	Yokosuka Naval Arsenal	19 March 1945	—N/a	—N/a	Discontinued on 17 April 1945.
Sakura	5496	櫻 (Cherry blossom)	Matsu	Yokosuka Naval Arsenal	2 June 1944	6 September 1944	25 November 1944	Sunk by a mine in the port of Osaka 11 July 1945
Yanagi	5497	柳 (Willow)	Matsu	Fujinagata Shipyards	20 August 1944	25 November 1944	8 January 1945	Heavily damaged by aircraft and ran aground on 14 July 1945 at Ōminato, scrapped on 1 April 1947
Tsubaki	5498	椿 (Camellia)	Matsu	Maizuru Naval Arsenal	20 June 1944	30 September 1944	30 November 1944	Scrapped 28 July 1948
Kaki	5499	柿 (Persimmon)	Tachibana	Yokosuka Naval Arsenal	5 October 1944	11 December 1944	5 March 1945	Surrendered to United States on 4 July 1947 at Qingdao. Sunk as target off 35°29′N 123°35′E, 19 August 1947
Kaba	5500	樺 (Birch)	Tachibana	Fujinagata Shipyards	15 October 1944	27 February 1945	29 May 1945	Surrendered to United States on 4 August 1947 at Sasebo, scrapped 1 March 1948
Hayaume	5501	早梅 (early blooming Prunus mume )	Tachibana	Yokosuka Naval Arsenal	—N/a	—N/a	—N/a	Cancelled in 1945.
Hinoki	5502	檜 (Chamaecyparis obtusa)	Matsu	Yokosuka Naval Arsenal	4 March 1944	4 July 1944	30 September 1944	Damaged 5 January by air attack while in company with the Momi, returned to Manila for repair and was sunk while leaving Manila Bay 7 January 1945 by US Navy destroyers
Katsura	5503	桂 (Cercidiphyllum)	Tachibana	Fujinagata Shipyards	30 November 1944	23 June 1945	—N/a	Construction stopped 23 June 1945. Converted to breakwater.
Tobiume	5504	飛梅 (A sacred Prunus mume at Dazaifu Tenman-gū)	Tachibana	Yokosuka Naval Arsenal	—N/a	—N/a	—N/a	Cancelled in 1945.
Kaede	5505	楓 (Maple)	Matsu	Yokosuka Naval Arsenal	4 March 1944	25 June 1944	30 October 1944	Surrendered at Kure. Handed over to the Republic of China on 6 July 1947 in Shanghai, named ROCN Heng Yang. Removed from the ROC Navy list in 1950, then scrapped in 1962.
Fuji	5506	藤 (Wisteria)	Tachibana	Yokosuka Naval Arsenal	—N/a	—N/a	—N/a	Cancelled in 1945.
Wakazakura	5507	若櫻 (Young cherry blossom)	Tachibana	Fujinagata Shipyards	15 January 1945	—N/a	—N/a	Discontinued on 11 May 1945, scrapped.
Keyaki	5508	欅 (Zelkova serrata)	Matsu	Yokosuka Naval Arsenal	22 June 1944	30 September 1944	15 December 1944	Surrendered to United States on 5 July 1947 at Yokosuka, Sunk as target off 34°44′N 140°01′E, 29 October 1947
Yamazakura	5509	山櫻 (Cherry blossom at mountain)	Tachibana	Fujinagata Shipyards	—N/a	—N/a	—N/a	Cancelled in 1945.
Ashi	5510	葦 (Phragmites)	Tachibana	Yokosuka Naval Arsenal	—N/a	—N/a	—N/a	Cancelled on 26 March 1945.
Tachibana	5511	橘 (Citrus tachibana)	Tachibana	Yokosuka Naval Arsenal	8 July 1944	14 October 1944	20 January 1945	Sunk on 14 July 1945 by US Navy carrier aircraft off Hakodate
Shinodake	5512	篠竹 (Simon bamboo)	Tachibana	Fujinagata Shipyards	—N/a	—N/a	—N/a	Cancelled in 1945.
Yomogi	5513	蓬 (Artemisia princeps)	Tachibana	Yokosuka Naval Arsenal	—N/a	—N/a	—N/a	Cancelled in 1945.
Tsuta	5514	蔦 (Parthenocissus tricuspidata)	Tachibana	Yokosuka Naval Arsenal	31 July 1944	2 November 1944	8 February 1945	Surrendered at Kure. Used to repatriate Japanese. Handed over to the Republic of China on 31 July 1947 in Shanghai. It was renamed ROCN Hua Yang, removed from the ROC Navy list on 11 November 1954.
Aoi	5515	葵 (Malvaceae)	Tachibana	Yokosuka Naval Arsenal	—N/a	—N/a	—N/a	Cancelled in 1945.
Shiraume	5516	白梅 (White blossom of Prunus mume)	Tachibana	Fujinagata Shipyards	—N/a	—N/a	—N/a	Cancelled in 1945.
Hagi	5517	萩 (Lespedeza)	Tachibana	Yokosuka Naval Arsenal	11 September 1944	27 November 1944	1 March 1945	Surrendered to United Kingdom on 16 July 1947 at Singapore, scrapped
Kiku	5518	菊 (Chrysanthemum)	Tachibana	Fujinagata Shipyards	—N/a	—N/a	—N/a	Cancelled in 1945.
Kashiwa	5519	柏 (Daimyo oak)	Tachibana	Yokosuka Naval Arsenal	—N/a	—N/a	—N/a	Cancelled in 1945.
Sumire	5520	菫 (Viola)	Tachibana	Yokosuka Naval Arsenal	21 October 1944	27 December 1944	26 March 1945	Surrendered to United Kingdom on 23 August 1947 at Hong Kong, sunk as target 1947
Kusunoki	5521	楠 (Cinnamomum camphora)	Tachibana	Yokosuka Naval Arsenal	9 November 1944	8 January 1945	28 April 1945	Surrendered to United Kingdom on 1947
Hatsuzakura	5522	初櫻 (Year's first cherry blossom)	Tachibana	Yokosuka Naval Arsenal	4 December 1944	10 February 1945	18 May 1945	Delivered to Soviet Union on 29 July 1947 at Nakhodka, renamed Vetrenny and soon Vyrazitel'ny (Выразительный), converted to target ship TSL-26 (1949), scrapped in 1958.
Kigiku	4801	黄菊 (Yellow chrysanthemum)	Tachibana	—N/a	—N/a	—N/a	—N/a	Cancelled in March 1945.
Hatsugiku	4802	初菊 (Year's first chrysanthemum)	Tachibana	—N/a	—N/a	—N/a	—N/a	Cancelled in March 1945.
Akane	4803	茜 (Madder)	Tachibana	—N/a	—N/a	—N/a	—N/a	Cancelled in March 1945.
Shiragiku	4804	白菊 (White Chrysanthemum)	Tachibana	—N/a	—N/a	—N/a	—N/a	Cancelled in March 1945.
Chigusa	4805	千草 (Grass)	Tachibana	—N/a	—N/a	—N/a	—N/a	Cancelled in March 1945.
Wakakusa	4806	若草 (Spring grass)	Tachibana	—N/a	—N/a	—N/a	—N/a	Cancelled in March 1945.
Natsugusa	4807	夏草 (Summer grass)	Tachibana	—N/a	—N/a	—N/a	—N/a	Cancelled in March 1945.
Akikusa	4808	秋草 (Autumn grass)	Tachibana	—N/a	—N/a	—N/a	—N/a	Cancelled in March 1945.
Nire	4809	楡 (Elm)	Tachibana	Maizuru Naval Arsenal	14 August 1944	25 November 1944	31 January 1945	Scrapped April 1948
Nashi	4810	梨 (Pyrus pyrifolia)	Tachibana	Kawasaki Dockyard Co.	1 September 1944	17 January 1945	15 March 1945	Sunk 28 July 1945 at Kure by US aircraft. Salvaged on 30 September 1954, Transferred to JDS Wakaba on 31 May 1956. Refitted in 1958 as a radar trials ship; sonar added in 1960. Struck on 31 March 1971 and scrapped 1972–1973.
Shii	4811	椎 (Castanopsis)	Tachibana	Maizuru Naval Arsenal	18 September 1944	13 January 1945	13 March 1945	Delivered to Soviet Union on 5 July 1947 at Nakhodka, renamed Vol'ny (Вольный), converted to target ship TSL-24 (1949), scrapped in 1960.
Enoki	4812	榎 (Japanese Hackberry)	Tachibana	Maizuru Naval Arsenal	14 October 1944	27 January 1945	31 March 1945	Sunk 26 June 1945 sunk in shallow water by contact mine at Obama, Fukui, raised and scrapped 1948.
Azusa	4813	梓 (Catalpa)	Tachibana	Yokosuka Naval Arsenal	29 December 1944	—N/a	—N/a	Discontinued on 17 April 1945.
Odake	4814	雄竹 (Great Bamboo)	Tachibana	Maizuru Naval Arsenal	5 November 1944	10 March 1945	15 May 1945	Surrendered to United States on 14 July 1947 at Qingdao. Sunk as target off 35°29′N 122°52′E, 17 September 1947
Hatsuume	4815	初梅 (Year's first Prunus mume)	Tachibana	Maizuru Naval Arsenal	8 December 1944	25 April 1945	18 June 1945	Surrendered at Maizuru. Handed over to the Republic of China on 6 July 1947 in Shanghai, called ROCN Xin Yang. Removed from the ROC Navy list and scrapped 1961.
Tochi	4816	栃 (Aesculus)	Tachibana	Maizuru Naval Arsenal	23 January 1945	(28 May 1945)	—N/a	Discontinued on 18 May 1945. Converted to breakwater.
Hishi	4817	菱 (Water caltrop)	Tachibana	Maizuru Naval Arsenal	10 February 1945	—N/a	—N/a	Discontinued on 17 April 1945.
Susuki	4818	薄 (Miscanthus sinensis)	Tachibana	—N/a	—N/a	—N/a	—N/a	Cancelled in March 1945.
Nogiku	4819	野菊 (Aster)	Tachibana	—N/a	—N/a	—N/a	—N/a	Cancelled in March 1945.
Sakaki	4820	榊 (Sakaki)	Tachibana	Yokosuka Naval Arsenal	29 December 1944	—N/a	—N/a	Discontinued on 17 April 1945.
—N/a	4821–4832	—N/a	Tachibana	—N/a	—N/a	—N/a	—N/a	(12 destroyers) Cancelled in March 1945.
—N/a	—N/a	—N/a	Kai-Tachibana	—N/a	—N/a	—N/a	—N/a	(80 destroyers) Cancelled on 30 June 1945.

== Bibliography ==
- Dodson, Aidan & Cant, Serena (2020). Spoils of War: The Fate of Enemy Fleets after Two World Wars. Barnsley, UK: Seaforth Publishing. ISBN 978-1-5267-4198-1.
- "Rekishi Gunzō"., History of Pacific War Vol.43 Matsu class destroyers, Gakken (Japan), November 2003, ISBN 4-05-603251-3
- "Rekishi Gunzō"., History of Pacific War Vol.51 The truth of Imperial Japanese Vessels Histories 2, Gakken (Japan), August 2005, ISBN 4-05-604083-4
- Collection of writings by Sizuo Fukui Vol.5, Stories of Japanese Destroyers, Kōjinsha (Japan) 1993, ISBN 4-7698-0611-6
- Model Art Extra No.340, Drawings of Imperial Japanese Naval Vessels Part-1, Model Art Co. Ltd. (Japan), October 1989, Book code 08734–10
- Daiji Katagiri, Ship Name Chronicles of the Imperial Japanese Navy Combined Fleet, Kōjinsha (Japan), June 1988, ISBN 4-7698-0386-9
- The Maru Special, Japanese Naval Vessels No.41 Japanese Destroyers I, Ushio Shobō (Japan), July 1980, Book code 68343–42
- Fitzsimons, Bernard, general editor. Illustrated Encyclopedia of Weapons and Warfare, Volume 17, p. 1854, "Matsu". London: Phoebus Publishing, 1978.
- Sturton, Ian (1980). "Japan". In Chesneau, Roger (ed.). Conway's All the World's Fighting Ships 1922–1946. Greenwich, UK: Conway Maritime Press. ISBN 0-85177-146-7.
- Whitley, M. J. (1988). Destroyers of World War Two: An International Encyclopedia. Annapolis, Maryland: Naval Institute Press. ISBN 0-87021-326-1.
