= Japanese destroyer Hatsuzakura =

WWII-era Japanese escort destroyer

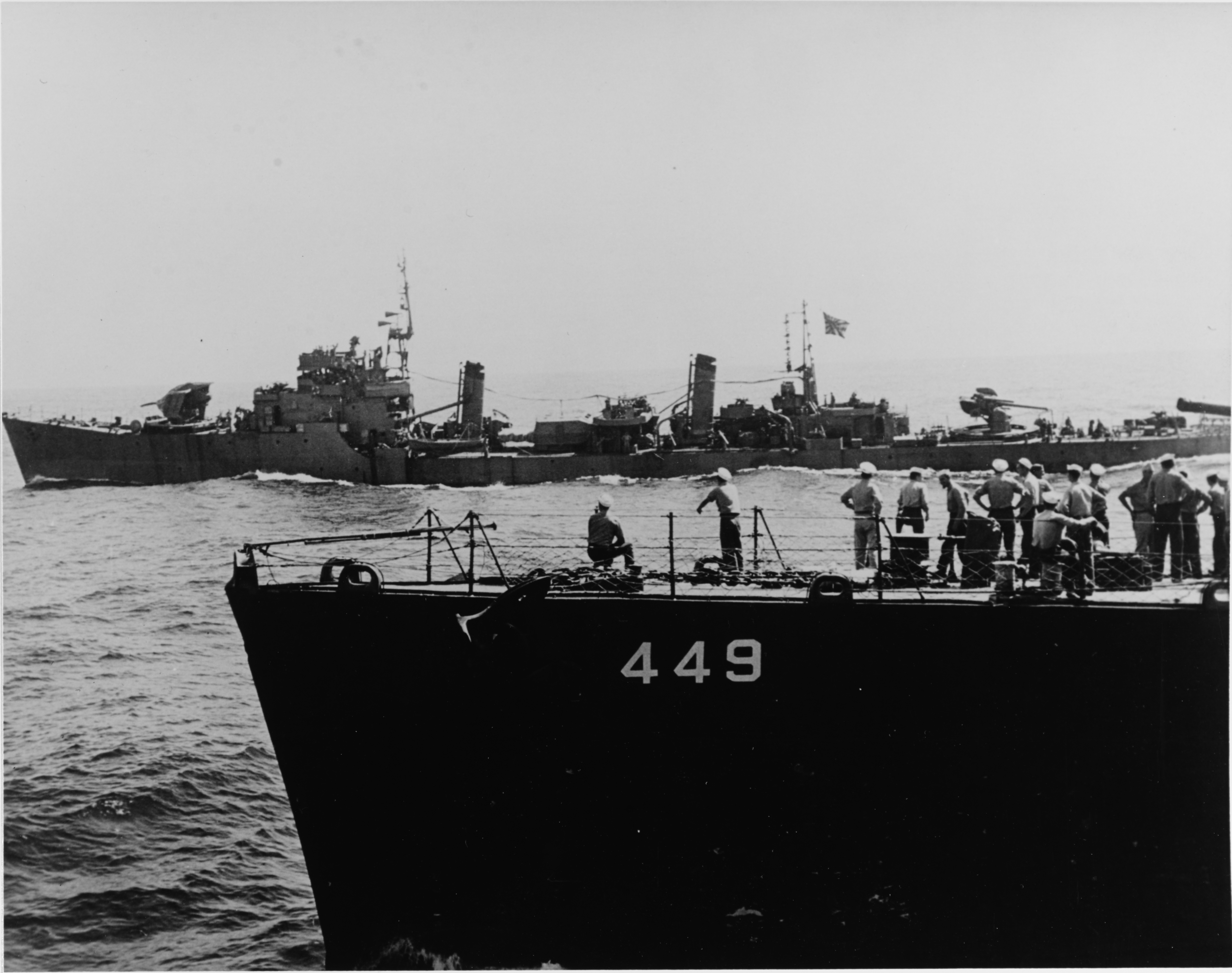
- Hatsuzakura bringing envoys, Tokyo Bay, 27 August 1945. The bow of USS Nicholas is in the foreground.

History

Empire of Japan
- Name: Hatsuzakura
- Namesake: Early-blooming Cherry
- Ordered: 1943
- Builder: Yokosuka Naval Arsenal
- Laid down: 12 April 1944
- Launched: 10 February 1945
- Completed: 28 May 1945
- Stricken: 15 September 1945
- Fate: Turned over to the Soviet Navy, 29 July 1947

Soviet Union
- Name: Vyrazitelny (Выразительный
- Acquired: 29 July 1947
- Commissioned: 29 July 1947
- Renamed: TsL-26, 17 June 1949
- Reclassified: Target ship, 17 June 1949
- Stricken: 11 March 1958
- Fate: Scrapped after 19 February 1959

General characteristics
- Class & type: Tachibana sub-class of the Matsu-class escort destroyer
- Displacement: 1,309 t (1,288 long tons) (standard)
- Length: 100 m (328 ft 1 in) (o/a)
- Beam: 9.35 m (30 ft 8 in)
- Draft: 3.37 m (11 ft 1 in)
- Installed power: 2 × water-tube boilers; 19,000 shp (14,000 kW)
- Propulsion: 2 shafts, 2 × geared steam turbines
- Speed: 27.8 knots (51.5 km/h; 32.0 mph)
- Range: 4,680 nmi (8,670 km; 5,390 mi) at 16 knots (30 km/h; 18 mph)
- Sensors & processing systems: 1 × Type 22 search radar; 1 × Type 13 early-warning radar
- Armament: 1 × twin, 1 × single 127 mm (5 in) DP guns; 4 × triple, 13 × single 25 mm (1 in) AA guns; 1 × quadruple 610 mm (24 in) torpedo tubes; 2 × rails, 2 × throwers for 60 depth charges

Hatsuzakura (初櫻; "Early-blooming Cherry") was one of 23 escort destroyers of the Tachibana sub-class of the Matsu class built for the Imperial Japanese Navy during the final stages of World War II. The ship was used to repatriate Japanese personnel after the war until 1947. Mid-year the destroyer was turned over to the Soviet Union and was commissioned that same year. She was renamed Vyrazitelny (Выразительный (Expressive)) later that year. When the ship was converted into a target ship in 1949, she was renamed TsL-26. The vessel was ordered to be scrapped a decade later.

== Design and description ==
The Tachibana sub-class was a simplified version of the preceding Matsu class to make them even more suited for mass production. The ships measured 100 meters (328 ft 1 in) long overall, with a beam of 9.35 meters (30 ft 8 in) and a draft of 3.37 meters (11 ft 1 in). They displaced 1,309 metric tons (1,288 long tons) at standard load and 1,554 metric tons (1,529 long tons) at deep load. The ships had two Kampon geared steam turbines, each driving one propeller shaft, using steam provided by two Kampon water-tube boilers. The turbines were rated at a total of 19,000 shaft horsepower (14,000 kW) for a speed of 27.8 knots (51.5 km/h; 32.0 mph). The Tachibanas had a range of 4,680 nautical miles (8,670 km; 5,390 mi) at 16 knots (30 km/h; 18 mph).

The main armament of the Tachibana sub-class consisted of three Type 89 127-millimeter (5 in) dual-purpose guns in one twin-gun mount aft and one single mount forward of the superstructure. The single mount was partially protected against spray by a gun shield. The accuracy of the Type 89 guns was severely reduced against aircraft because no high-angle gunnery director was fitted. They carried a total of 25 Type 96 25-millimeter (1 in) anti-aircraft guns in 4 triple and 13 single mounts. The Tachibanas were equipped with Type 13 early-warning and Type 22 surface-search radars. The ships were also armed with a single rotating quadruple mount amidships for 610-millimeter (24 in) torpedoes. They could deliver their 60 depth charges via two stern rails and two throwers.

== Construction and service ==
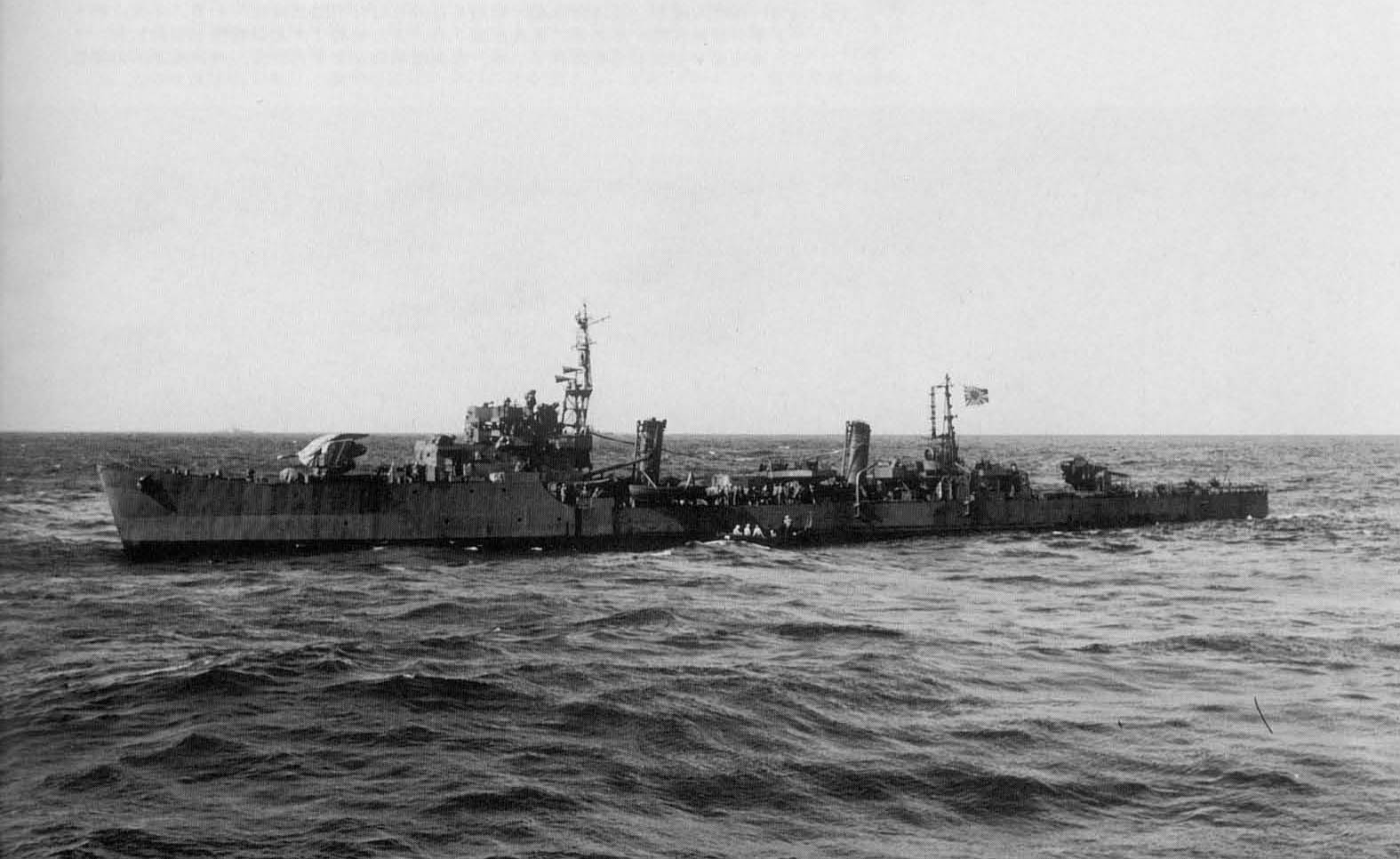
Hatsuzakura in Tokyo Bay, 27 August 1945

Hatsuzakura (Early-blooming Cherry) was ordered in Fiscal Year 1943 under the Modified 5th Naval Armaments Supplement Program as part of the Matsu class, but the design was simplified to facilitate production and the ship was one of those built to the modified design. She was laid down on 12 April 1944 by Yokosuka Naval Arsenal, launched on 10 February 1945 and completed on 28 May. Hatsuzakura was assigned that day to Destroyer Squadron 11 under the Combined Fleet for working up; on 15 July she was transferred to the Yokosuka Naval District. On 27 August the ship ferried Japanese emissaries and local pilots to the entrance to Tokyo Bay to meet the American battleship Missouri. The ship was turned over to Allied forces at Yokosuka at the time of the surrender of Japan on 2 September and was stricken from the navy list on 15 September. The destroyer was disarmed and used to repatriate Japanese personnel in 1945–1947. Hatsuzakura was turned over to the Soviet Union on 29 July of the latter year.

The ship was commissioned that same day and assigned to the Fifth Fleet. Hatsuzakura was renamed Vyrazitelny on 2 October and was placed in reserve on 14 February 1949. She was disarmed, converted into a target ship and renamed TsL-26 on 17 June. The ship was transferred to the Pacific Fleet on 23 April 1953. She was stricken from the navy list on 11 March 1958 and ordered to be scrapped on 19 February 1959.

== Bibliography ==
- Berezhnoy, Sergey (1994). Трофеи и репарации ВМФ СССР [Trophies and Reparations of the Soviet Navy] (in Russian). Yakutsk: Sakhapoligrafizdat. OCLC 33334505.
- Jentschura, Hansgeorg; Jung, Dieter & Mickel, Peter (1977). Warships of the Imperial Japanese Navy, 1869–1945. Annapolis, Maryland: United States Naval Institute. ISBN 0-87021-893-X.
- Nevitt, Allyn D. (1998). "IJN Hatsuzakura: Tabular Record of Movement". www.combinedfleet.com.
- Stille, Mark (2013). Imperial Japanese Navy Destroyers 1919–45 (2): Asahio to Tachibana Classes. Botley, UK: Osprey Publishing. ISBN 978-1-84908-987-6.
- Sturton, Ian (1980). "Japan". In Chesneau, Roger (ed.). Conway's All the World's Fighting Ships 1922–1946. Greenwich, UK: Conway Maritime Press. ISBN 0-85177-146-7.
- Whitley, M. J. (1988). Destroyers of World War Two: An International Encyclopedia. Annapolis, Maryland: Naval Institute Press. ISBN 0-87021-326-1.
