= Japanese destroyer Sumire (1944) =

WWII-era Japanese escort destroyer

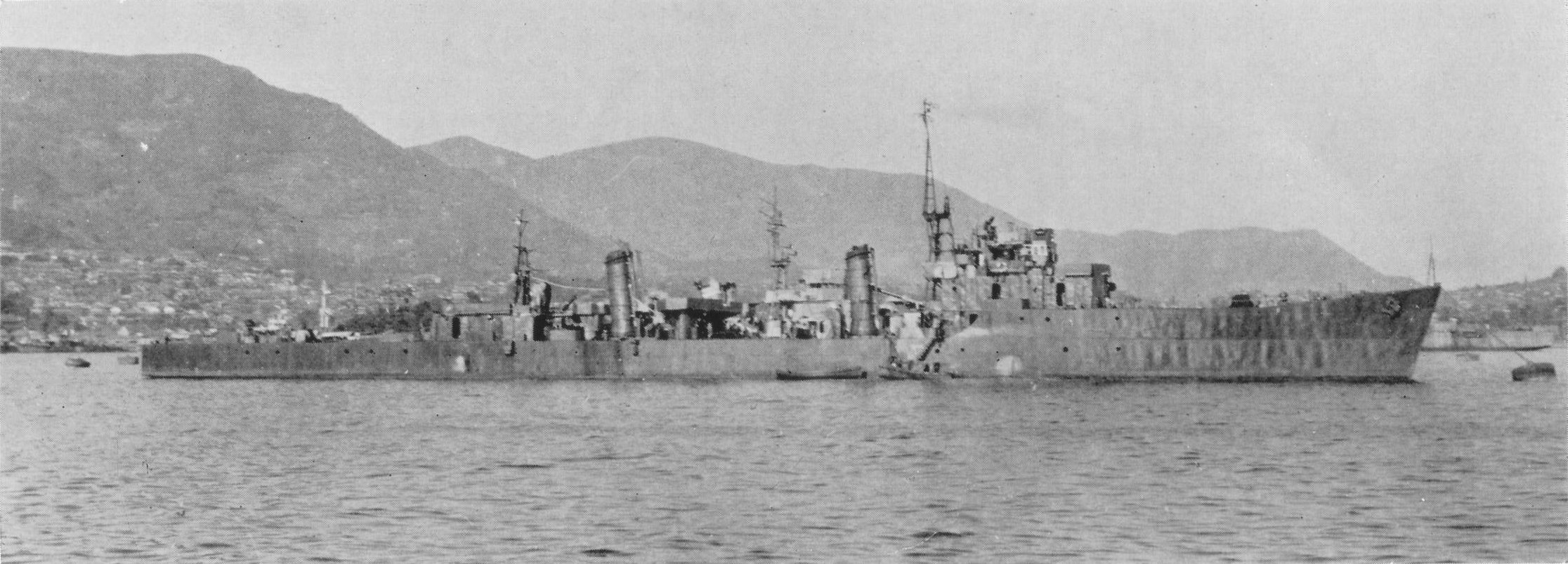
- Sumire just before leaving Sasebo for Hong Kong, 26 July 1947

History

Empire of Japan
- Name: Sumire
- Namesake: Violet
- Ordered: 1943
- Builder: Yokosuka Naval Arsenal
- Laid down: 21 October 1944
- Launched: 27 December 1944
- Completed: 26 March 1945
- Stricken: 5 October 1945
- Fate: Turned over to the Royal Navy, 20 August 1947, and sunk as a target

General characteristics
- Class & type: Tachibana sub-class of the Matsu-class escort destroyer
- Displacement: 1,309 t (1,288 long tons) (standard)
- Length: 100 m (328 ft 1 in) (o/a)
- Beam: 9.35 m (30 ft 8 in)
- Draft: 3.37 m (11 ft 1 in)
- Installed power: 2 × water-tube boilers; 19,000 shp (14,000 kW)
- Propulsion: 2 shafts, 2 × geared steam turbines
- Speed: 27.8 knots (51.5 km/h; 32.0 mph)
- Range: 4,680 nmi (8,670 km; 5,390 mi) at 16 knots (30 km/h; 18 mph)
- Sensors & processing systems: 1 × Type 22 search radar; 1 × Type 13 early-warning radar
- Armament: 1 × twin, 1 × single 127 mm (5 in) DP guns; 4 × triple, 13 × single 25 mm (1 in) AA guns; 1 × quadruple 610 mm (24 in) torpedo tubes; 2 × rails, 2 × throwers for 60 depth charges

Sumire (菫; "Violet") was one of 23 escort destroyers of the Tachibana sub-class of the Matsu class built for the Imperial Japanese Navy during the final stages of World War II. Completed in March 1945, she saw no combat during the war and was used to repatriate Japanese personnel after the war until 1947. Mid-year the destroyer was turned over to Great Britain and subsequently sunk as a target.

== Design and description ==
The Tachibana sub-class was a simplified version of the preceding Matsu class to make them even more suited for mass production. The ships measured 100 meters (328 ft 1 in) long overall, with a beam of 9.35 meters (30 ft 8 in) and a draft of 3.37 meters (11 ft 1 in). They displaced 1,309 metric tons (1,288 long tons) at standard load and 1,554 metric tons (1,529 long tons) at deep load. The ships had two Kampon geared steam turbines, each driving one propeller shaft, using steam provided by two Kampon water-tube boilers. The turbines were rated at a total of 19,000 shaft horsepower (14,000 kW) for a speed of 27.8 knots (51.5 km/h; 32.0 mph). The Tachibanas had a range of 4,680 nautical miles (8,670 km; 5,390 mi) at 16 knots (30 km/h; 18 mph).

The main armament of the Tachibana sub-class consisted of three Type 89 127-millimeter (5 in) dual-purpose guns in one twin-gun mount aft and one single mount forward of the superstructure. The single mount was partially protected against spray by a gun shield. The accuracy of the Type 89 guns was severely reduced against aircraft because no high-angle gunnery director was fitted. They carried a total of 25 Type 96 25-millimeter (1 in) anti-aircraft guns in 4 triple and 13 single mounts. The Tachibanas were equipped with Type 13 early-warning and Type 22 surface-search radars. The ships were also armed with a single rotating quadruple mount amidships for 610-millimeter (24 in) torpedoes. They could deliver their 60 depth charges via two stern rails and two throwers.

== Construction and service ==
Sumire (Violet) was ordered in Fiscal Year 1943 under the Modified 5th Naval Armaments Supplement Program as part of the Matsu class, but the design was simplified to facilitate production and the ship was one of those built to the modified design. She was laid down on 21 October 1944 by Yokosuka Naval Arsenal, launched on 27 December and completed on 26 March 1945. Sumire was assigned that day to Destroyer Squadron 11 under the Combined Fleet for working up, and was briefly attached to the Second Fleet on 1–20 April. She was training in the Seto Inland Sea from 1 June to 23 July and was transferred to the Maizuru Naval District on the 15th. The ship was turned over to Allied forces at Maizuru at the time of the surrender of Japan on 2 September and was stricken from the navy list on 5 October. The destroyer was disarmed and used to repatriate Japanese personnel in 1945–1947. Sumire was turned over to Great Britain on 20 August of the latter year and subsequently sunk as a target ship.

== Bibliography ==
- Jentschura, Hansgeorg; Jung, Dieter & Mickel, Peter (1977). Warships of the Imperial Japanese Navy, 1869–1945. Annapolis, Maryland: United States Naval Institute. ISBN 0-87021-893-X.
- Nevitt, Allyn D. (1998). "IJN Sumire: Tabular Record of Movement". www.combinedfleet.com.
- Stille, Mark (2013). Imperial Japanese Navy Destroyers 1919–45 (2): Asahio to Tachibana Classes. Botley, UK: Osprey Publishing. ISBN 978-1-84908-987-6.
- Sturton, Ian (1980). "Japan". In Chesneau, Roger (ed.). Conway's All the World's Fighting Ships 1922–1946. Greenwich, UK: Conway Maritime Press. ISBN 0-85177-146-7.
- Whitley, M. J. (1988). Destroyers of World War Two: An International Encyclopedia. Annapolis, Maryland: Naval Institute Press. ISBN 0-87021-326-1.
