= Japanese destroyer Tachibana (1944) =

WWII-era Japanese escort destroyer

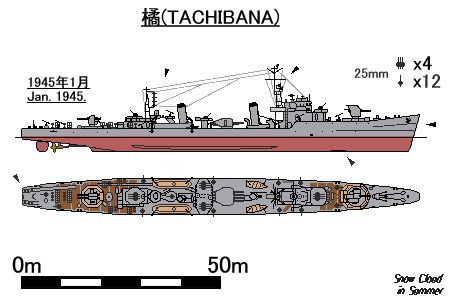
- Right profile and plan drawing of Tachibana

History

Empire of Japan
- Name: Tachibana
- Builder: Yokosuka Naval Arsenal
- Laid down: 8 July 1944
- Launched: 14 October 1944
- Completed: 20 January 1945
- Stricken: 10 August 1945
- Fate: Sunk by US aircraft, 14 July 1945

General characteristics
- Class & type: Tachibana sub-class of the Matsu-class escort destroyer
- Displacement: 1,309 t (1,288 long tons) (standard)
- Length: 100 m (328 ft 1 in) (o/a)
- Beam: 9.35 m (30 ft 8 in)
- Draft: 3.37 m (11 ft 1 in)
- Installed power: 2 × water-tube boilers; 19,000 shp (14,000 kW)
- Propulsion: 2 shafts, 2 × geared steam turbines
- Speed: 27.8 knots (51.5 km/h; 32.0 mph)
- Range: 4,680 nmi (8,670 km; 5,390 mi) at 16 knots (30 km/h; 18 mph)
- Sensors & processing systems: 1 × Type 22 search radar; 1 × Type 13 early-warning radar
- Armament: 1 × twin, 1 × single 127 mm (5 in) DP guns; 4 × triple, 13 × single 25 mm (1 in) AA guns; 1 × quadruple 610 mm (24 in) torpedo tubes; 2 × rails, 2 × throwers for 60 depth charges

Tachibana (橘) was the lead ship of her sub-class (also known as the "modified Type-D" class) of the Matsu-class escort destroyers built for the Imperial Japanese Navy during the final stages of World War II. Completed in early 1945, the ship was assigned to convoy escort duties in home waters. She was sunk on 14 July with the loss of 135 crewmen by American carrier aircraft attacking targets in southern Hokkaido.

== Design and description ==
The Tachibana sub-class was a simplified version of the preceding Matsu class to make them even more suited for mass production. The ships measured 100 meters (328 ft 1 in) long overall, with a beam of 9.35 meters (30 ft 8 in) and a draft of 3.37 meters (11 ft 1 in). They displaced 1,309 metric tons (1,288 long tons) at standard load and 1,554 metric tons (1,529 long tons) at deep load. The ships had two Kampon geared steam turbines, each driving one propeller shaft, using steam provided by two Kampon water-tube boilers. The turbines were rated at a total of 19,000 shaft horsepower (14,000 kW) for a speed of 27.8 knots (51.5 km/h; 32.0 mph). The Tachibanas had a range of 4,680 nautical miles (8,670 km; 5,390 mi) at 16 knots (30 km/h; 18 mph).

The main armament of the Tachibana sub-class consisted of three Type 89 127-millimeter (5 in) dual-purpose guns in one twin-gun mount aft and one single mount forward of the superstructure. The single mount was partially protected against spray by a gun shield. The accuracy of the Type 89 guns was severely reduced against aircraft because no high-angle gunnery director was fitted. They carried a total of 25 Type 96 25-millimeter (1 in) anti-aircraft guns in 4 triple and 13 single mounts. The Tachibanas were equipped with Type 13 early-warning and Type 22 surface-search radars. The ships were also armed with a single rotating quadruple mount amidships for 610-millimeter (24 in) torpedoes. They could deliver their 60 depth charges via two stern rails and two throwers.

== Construction and career ==
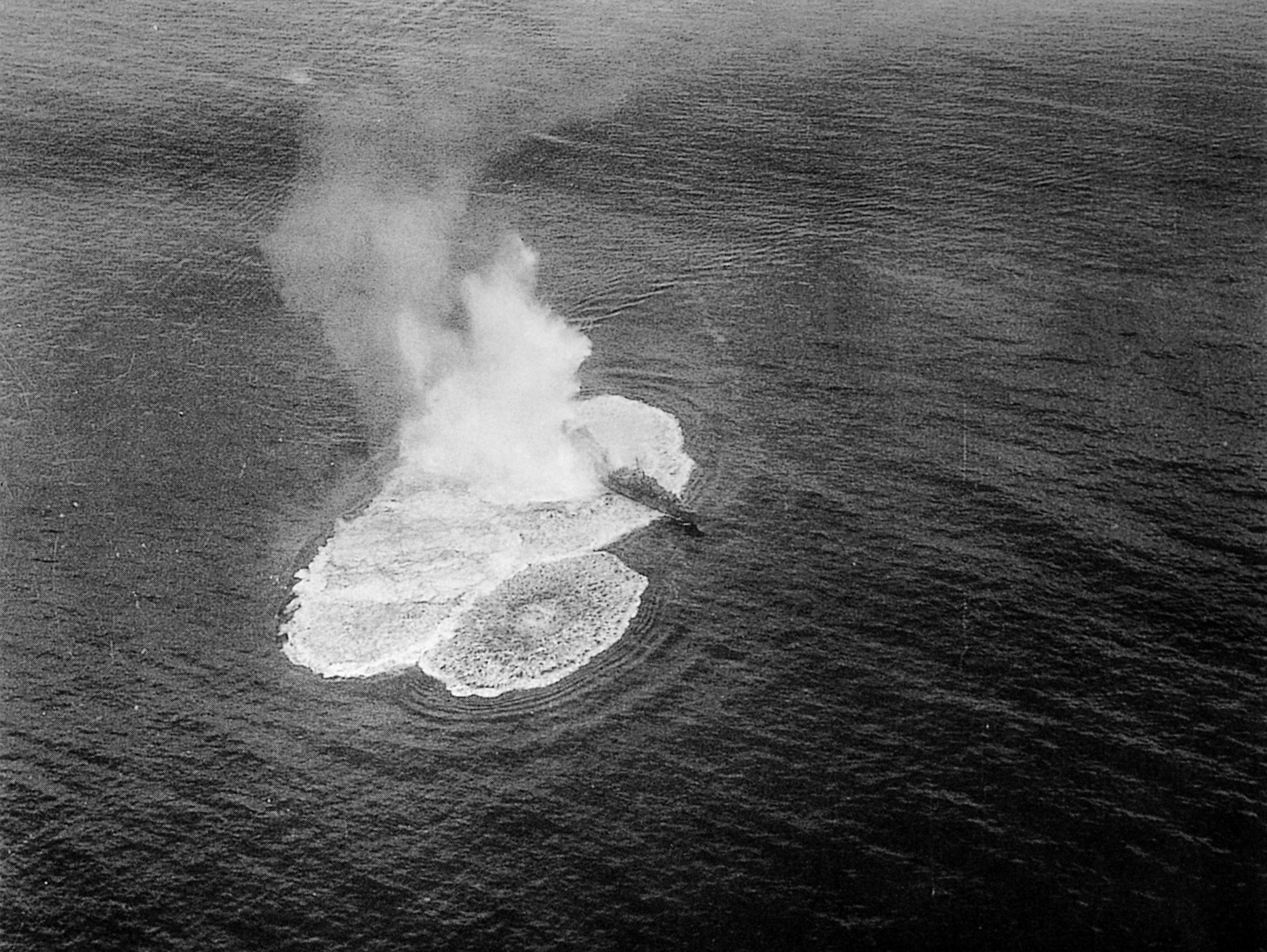
A Japanese destroyer under attack off Fukushima, Hokkaido, on 14 July 1945, probably either Tachibana or Yanagi which was heavily damaged in the same area

Tachibana (Mandarin Orange) was ordered in Fiscal Year 1943 under the Modified 5th Naval Armaments Supplement Program as part of the Matsu class, but the design was simplified to facilitate production and the ship was one of those built to the modified design, lending her name to the sub-class. She was laid down on 8 July 1944 by Yokosuka Naval Arsenal, launched on 14 October and completed on 20 January 1945. The ship was assigned to the Combined Fleet for working up, and was briefly attached to the Second Fleet on 1–20 April. On 22 May Tachibana arrived at Ominato at the northern end of Honshu for escort and patrol duties. The destroyer was sunk on 14 July at 41°48′N 141°41′E by US aircraft from Task Force 38 during their raids on Hakodate Bay, with 135 crewmen killed. The ship was stricken from the Navy List on 10 August.

== Bibliography ==
- Herder, Brian Lane (2020). The Naval Siege of Japan 1945: War Plan Orange Triumphant. Campaign. Vol. 348. Oxford, UK: Osprey Publishing. ISBN 978-1-47284-036-3.
- Jentschura, Hansgeorg; Jung, Dieter & Mickel, Peter (1977). Warships of the Imperial Japanese Navy, 1869–1945. Annapolis, Maryland: United States Naval Institute. ISBN 0-87021-893-X.
- Nevitt, Allyn D. (1998). "IJN Tachibana: Tabular Record of Movement". www.combinedfleet.com.
- Rohwer, Jürgen (2005). Chronology of the War at Sea 1939–1945: The Naval History of World War Two (Third Revised ed.). Annapolis, Maryland: Naval Institute Press. ISBN 1-59114-119-2.
- Stille, Mark (2013). Imperial Japanese Navy Destroyers 1919–45 (2): Asahio to Tachibana Classes. Botley, UK: Osprey Publishing. ISBN 978-1-84908-987-6.
- Sturton, Ian (1980). "Japan". In Chesneau, Roger (ed.). Conway's All the World's Fighting Ships 1922–1946. Greenwich, UK: Conway Maritime Press. ISBN 0-85177-146-7.
- Whitley, M. J. (1988). Destroyers of World War Two: An International Encyclopedia. Annapolis, Maryland: Naval Institute Press. ISBN 0-87021-326-1.
