= Japanese destroyer Sakura (1944) =

Imperial Japanese Navy's Matsu-class destroyer

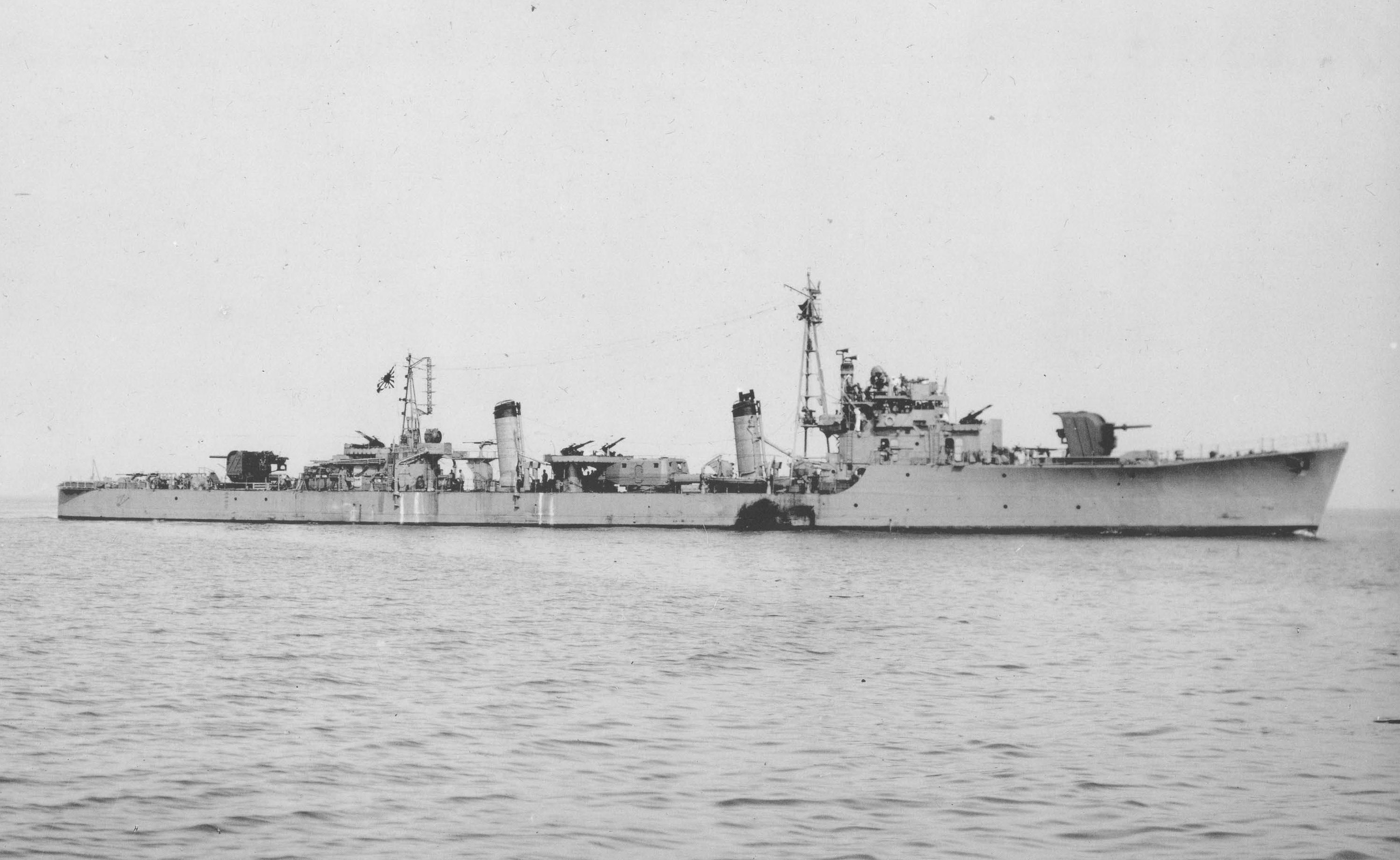
- Sister ship Momi, 4 September 1944

History

Empire of Japan
- Name: Sakura
- Namesake: Cherry blossom
- Builder: Yokosuka Naval Arsenal
- Laid down: 2 June 1944
- Launched: 6 September 1944
- Completed: 25 November 1944
- Stricken: 10 August 1945
- Fate: Sunk by mine, 11 July 1945

General characteristics (as built)
- Class & type: Matsu-class escort destroyer
- Displacement: 1,282 t (1,262 long tons) (standard)
- Length: 100 m (328 ft 1 in) (o/a)
- Beam: 9.35 m (30 ft 8 in)
- Draft: 3.3 m (10 ft 10 in)
- Installed power: 2 × water-tube boilers; 19,000 shp (14,000 kW)
- Propulsion: 2 shafts, 2 × geared steam turbines
- Speed: 27.8 knots (51.5 km/h; 32.0 mph)
- Range: 4,680 nmi (8,670 km; 5,390 mi) at 16 knots (30 km/h; 18 mph)
- Complement: 210
- Sensors & processing systems: 1 × Type 22 search radar; 1 × Type 13 early-warning radar
- Armament: 1 × twin, 1 × single 127 mm (5 in) DP guns; 4 × triple, 13 × single 25 mm (1 in) AA guns; 1 × quadruple 610 mm (24 in) torpedo tubes; 2 × rails, 2 × throwers for 36 depth charges

Sakura (桜 or 櫻; "cherry blossom") was one of 18 Matsu-class destroyers built for the Imperial Japanese Navy (IJN) during the final stages of World War II. Completed in late 1944, the ship was assigned to convoy escort duties in February 1945. She was slightly damaged when she struck a mine in May. Sakura sank after striking another mine near Osaka on 11 July with heavy loss of life.

== Design and description ==
Designed for ease of production, the Matsu class was smaller, slower and more lightly armed than previous destroyers as the IJN intended them for second-line duties like escorting convoys, releasing the larger ships for missions with the fleet. The ships measured 100 meters (328 ft 1 in) long overall, with a beam of 9.35 meters (30 ft 8 in) and a draft of 3.3 meters (10 ft 10 in). Their crew numbered 210 officers and enlisted men. They displaced 1,282 metric tons (1,262 long tons) at standard load and 1,554 metric tons (1,529 long tons) at deep load. The ships had two Kampon geared steam turbines, each driving one propeller shaft, using steam provided by two Kampon water-tube boilers. The turbines were rated at a total of 19,000 shaft horsepower (14,000 kW) for a speed of 27.8 knots (51.5 km/h; 32.0 mph). The Matsus had a range of 4,680 nautical miles (8,670 km; 5,390 mi) at 16 knots (30 km/h; 18 mph).

The main armament of the Matsu-class ships consisted of three 127-millimeter (5 in) Type 89 dual-purpose guns in one twin-gun mount aft and one single mount forward of the superstructure. The single mount was partially protected against spray by a gun shield. The accuracy of the Type 89 guns was severely reduced against aircraft because no high-angle gunnery director was fitted. The ships carried a total of twenty-five 25-millimeter (1 in) Type 96 anti-aircraft guns in 4 triple and 13 single mounts. The Matsus were equipped with Type 13 early-warning and Type 22 surface-search radars. The ships were also armed with a single rotating quadruple mount amidships for 610-millimeter (24 in) torpedoes. They could deliver their 36 depth charges via two stern rails and two throwers.

== Construction and career ==
Authorized in the late 1942 Modified 5th Naval Armaments Supplement Program, Sakura (cherry blossom) was laid down on 2 June 1944 at the Yokosuka Naval Arsenal and launched on 6 September. Upon her completion on 25 November, the ship was assigned to Destroyer Squadron 11 of the Combined Fleet for training. On 12 February 1945, Sakura departed Moji as part of the escort for Convoy MOTA-36 bound for Keelung, Taiwan. She then escorted the cruiser Kashima to Shanghai, China and remained in the area, tasked with patrol and escort duties. On 15 March the ship was reassigned to the squadron's Destroyer Division 53. Six days later Sakura arrived at Kure, Japan. The squadron was briefly attached to the Second Fleet from 1–20 April before rejoining the Combined Fleet.

Sakura was slightly damaged when she struck a mine in Shimonoseki Strait between Kyushu and Honshu on 25 May. The ship was tasked with minesweeping duties the following month. When she struck a mine on 11 July in Osaka Harbor, her aft magazine exploded, severing her stern. The ship sank at coordinates 34°36′N 135°28′E with the loss of 130 crewmen. Sakura was removed from the navy list on 10 August.

== Bibliography ==
- Jentschura, Hansgeorg; Jung, Dieter & Mickel, Peter (1977). Warships of the Imperial Japanese Navy, 1869–1945. Annapolis, Maryland: United States Naval Institute. ISBN 0-87021-893-X.
- Nevitt, Allyn D. (1998). "IJN Sakura: Tabular Record of Movement". www.combinedfleet.com.
- Stille, Mark (2013). Imperial Japanese Navy Destroyers 1919–45 (2): Asahio to Tachibana Classes. Botley, UK: Osprey Publishing. ISBN 978-1-84908-987-6.
- Sturton, Ian (1980). "Japan". In Chesneau, Roger (ed.). Conway's All the World's Fighting Ships 1922–1946. Greenwich, UK: Conway Maritime Press. ISBN 0-85177-146-7.
- Whitley, M. J. (1988). Destroyers of World War Two: An International Encyclopedia. Annapolis, Maryland: Naval Institute Press. ISBN 0-87021-326-1.
