= Japanese destroyer Odake =

WWII-era Japanese escort destroyer

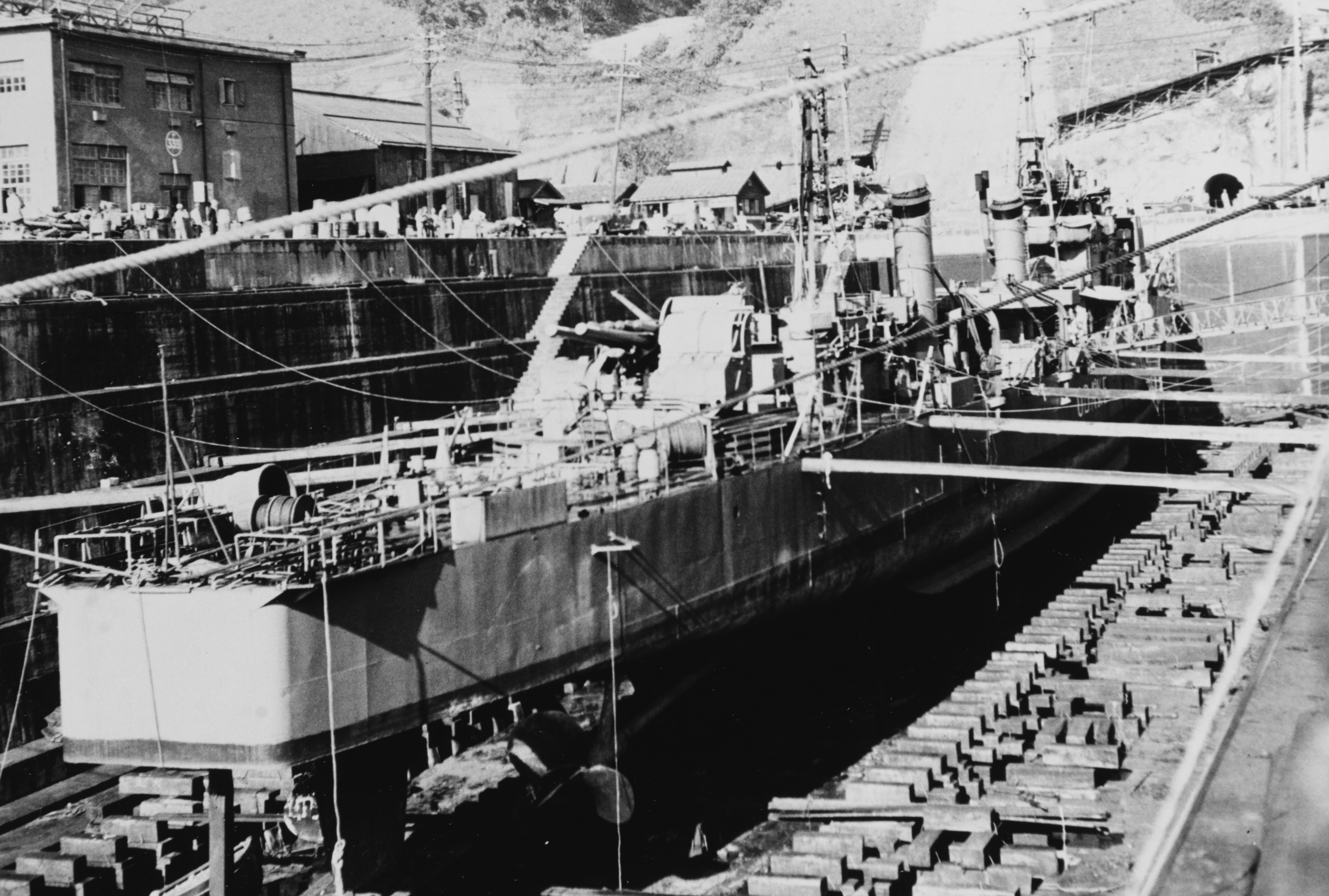
- Odake at the Maizuru Naval Yard, undergoing conversion for repatriation service, 13 October 1945

History

Empire of Japan
- Name: Odake
- Namesake: Great Bamboo
- Ordered: 1944
- Builder: Maizuru Naval Arsenal
- Laid down: 5 November 1944
- Launched: 10 March 1945
- Completed: 15 May 1945
- Stricken: 5 October 1945
- Fate: Turned over to the US Navy, 4 July 1945, and scrapped

General characteristics
- Class & type: Tachibana sub-class of the Matsu-class escort destroyer
- Displacement: 1,309 t (1,288 long tons) (standard)
- Length: 100 m (328 ft 1 in) (o/a)
- Beam: 9.35 m (30 ft 8 in)
- Draft: 3.37 m (11 ft 1 in)
- Installed power: 2 × water-tube boilers; 19,000 shp (14,000 kW)
- Propulsion: 2 shafts, 2 × geared steam turbines
- Speed: 27.8 knots (51.5 km/h; 32.0 mph)
- Range: 4,680 nmi (8,670 km; 5,390 mi) at 16 knots (30 km/h; 18 mph)
- Sensors & processing systems: 1 × Type 22 search radar; 1 × Type 13 early-warning radar
- Armament: 1 × twin, 1 × single 127 mm (5 in) DP guns; 4 × triple, 13 × single 25 mm (1 in) AA guns; 1 × quadruple 610 mm (24 in) torpedo tubes; 2 × rails, 2 × throwers for 60 depth charges

Odake (雄竹; "Great Bamboo") was one of 23 escort destroyers of the Tachibana sub-class of the Matsu class built for the Imperial Japanese Navy during the final stages of World War II. She was used to repatriate Japanese personnel after the war until 1947. Mid-year the destroyer was turned over to the United States and subsequently scrapped.

== Design and description ==
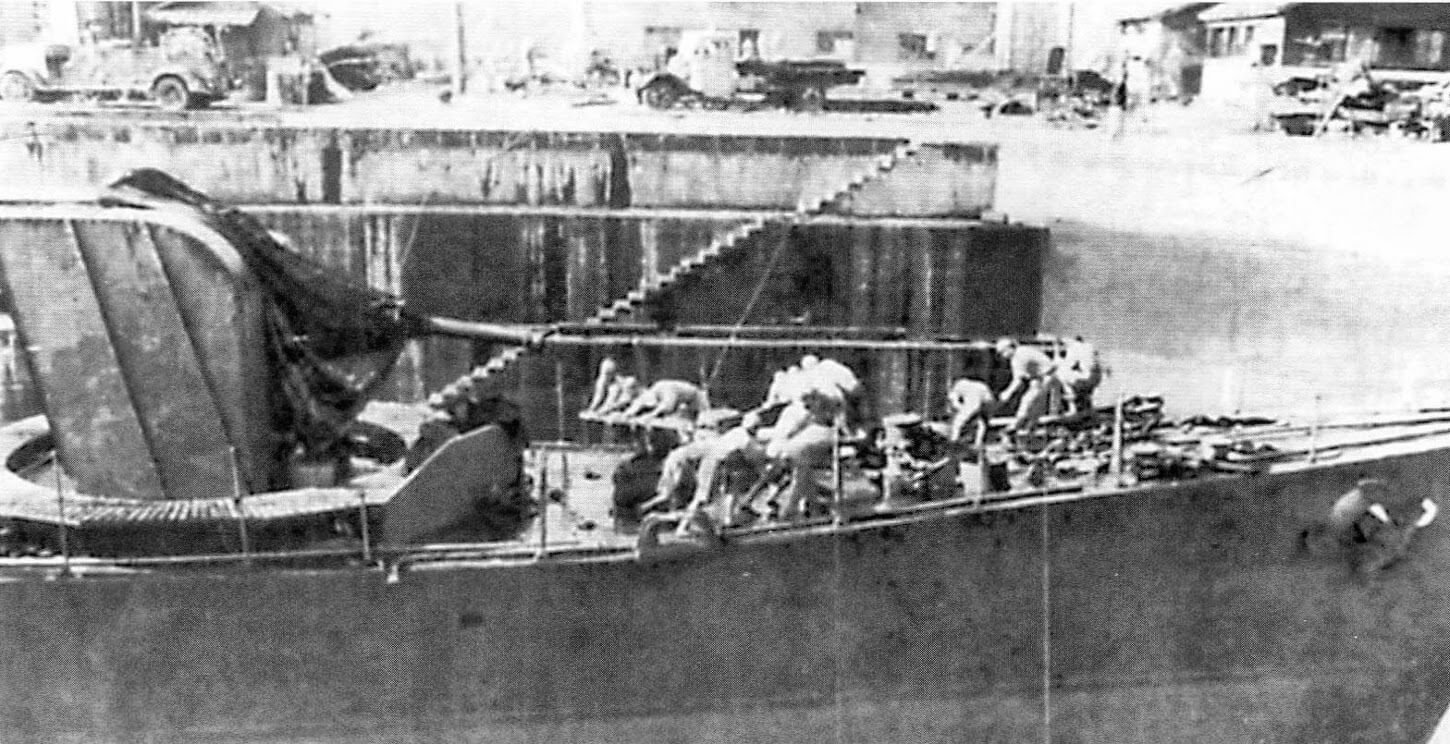
Bow and main gun of Odake

The Tachibana sub-class was a simplified version of the preceding Matsu class to make them even more suited for mass production. The ships measured 100 meters (328 ft 1 in) long overall, with a beam of 9.35 meters (30 ft 8 in) and a draft of 3.37 meters (11 ft 1 in). They displaced 1,309 metric tons (1,288 long tons) at standard load and 1,554 metric tons (1,529 long tons) at deep load. The ships had two Kampon geared steam turbines, each driving one propeller shaft using steam provided by two Kampon water-tube boilers. The turbines were rated at a total of 19,000 shaft horsepower (14,000 kW) for a speed of 27.8 knots (51.5 km/h; 32.0 mph). The Tachibanas had a range of 4,680 nautical miles (8,670 km; 5,390 mi) at 16 knots (30 km/h; 18 mph).

The main armament of the Tachibana sub-class consisted of three 127-millimeter (5 in) Type 89 dual-purpose guns in one twin-gun mount aft and one single mount forward of the superstructure. The single mount was partially protected against spray by a gun shield. The accuracy of the Type 89 guns was severely reduced against aircraft because no high-angle gunnery director was fitted. The ships carried a total of 25 Type 96 25-millimeter (1 in) anti-aircraft guns in 4 triple and 13 single mounts. The Tachibanas were equipped with Type 13 early-warning and Type 22 surface-search radars. The ships were also armed with a single rotating quadruple mount amidships for 610-millimeter (24 in) torpedoes. They could deliver their 60 depth charges via two stern rails and two throwers.

== Construction and service ==
Odake (Great Bamboo) was ordered in Fiscal Year 1944 under the Wartime Naval Armaments Supplement Program and she was laid down at Maizuru Naval Arsenal on 5 November 1944. The ship was launched on 10 March 1945 and completed on 15 May. Odake was assigned that day to Destroyer Squadron 11 under the Combined Fleet for working up and she was transferred to the Maizuru Naval District on 15 July. The ship was turned over to Allied forces at Maizuru at the time of the surrender of Japan and was stricken from the navy list on 5 October. The destroyer was disarmed and used to repatriate Japanese personnel in 1945–1947. Kaki was turned over to the United States on 4 July of the latter year and subsequently broken up.

== Bibliography ==
- Jentschura, Hansgeorg; Jung, Dieter & Mickel, Peter (1977). Warships of the Imperial Japanese Navy, 1869–1945. Annapolis, Maryland: United States Naval Institute. ISBN 0-87021-893-X.
- Nevitt, Allyn D. (1998). "IJN Odake: Tabular Record of Movement". www.combinedfleet.com.
- Stille, Mark (2013). Imperial Japanese Navy Destroyers 1919–45 (2): Asahio to Tachibana Classes. Botley, UK: Osprey Publishing. ISBN 978-1-84908-987-6.
- Sturton, Ian (1980). "Japan". In Chesneau, Roger (ed.). Conway's All the World's Fighting Ships 1922–1946. Greenwich, UK: Conway Maritime Press. ISBN 0-85177-146-7.
- Whitley, M. J. (1988). Destroyers of World War Two: An International Encyclopedia. Annapolis, Maryland: Naval Institute Press. ISBN 0-87021-326-1.
