= Japanese destroyer Kaede (1944) =

Imperial Japanese Navy's Matsu-class destroyer

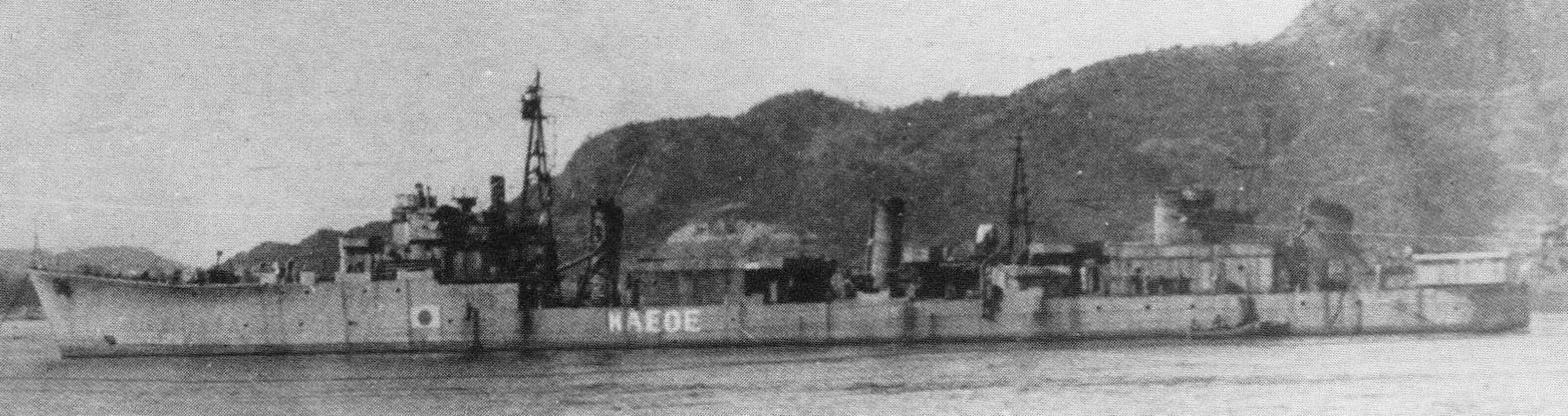
- Disarmed Kaede after the surrender of Japan

History

Empire of Japan
- Name: Kaede
- Builder: Yokosuka Naval Arsenal
- Laid down: 4 March 1944
- Launched: 25 July 1944
- Completed: 30 October 1944
- Stricken: 5 October 1945
- Fate: Transferred to the Republic of China Navy, 6 July 1947

Republic of China
- Name: ROCS Heng Yang
- Acquired: 6 July 1947
- Reclassified: As a training ship, 1 October 1949
- Stricken: 1960
- Fate: Scrapped, 1962

General characteristics (as built)
- Class & type: Matsu-class escort destroyer
- Displacement: 1,282 t (1,262 long tons) (standard)
- Length: 100 m (328 ft 1 in) (o/a)
- Beam: 9.35 m (30 ft 8 in)
- Draft: 3.3 m (10 ft 10 in)
- Installed power: 2 × water-tube boilers; 19,000 shp (14,000 kW)
- Propulsion: 2 shafts, 2 × geared steam turbines
- Speed: 27.8 knots (51.5 km/h; 32.0 mph)
- Range: 4,680 nmi (8,670 km; 5,390 mi) at 16 knots (30 km/h; 18 mph)
- Complement: 210
- Sensors & processing systems: 1 × Type 22 search radar; 1 × Type 13 early-warning radar
- Armament: 1 × twin, 1 × single 127 mm (5 in) DP guns; 4 × triple, 13 × single 25 mm (1 in) AA guns; 1 × quadruple 610 mm (24 in) torpedo tubes; 2 × rails, 2 × throwers for 36 depth charges

Kaede (楓; "maple") was one of 18 Matsu-class destroyers built for the Imperial Japanese Navy (IJN) during the final stages of World War II. Completed in late 1944, the ship was assigned to convoy escort duties in January 1945. After escorting one convoy to southern China, she joined two other destroyers tasked to evacuate Japanese airmen from the Philippines. En route the ships were attacked by American bombers that badly damaged Kaede. The ship returned to Japan for repairs and was inactive for the rest of the war. She was surrendered to the Allies at the end of the war and used to repatriate Japanese troops until 1947. Mid-year the destroyer was turned over to the Republic of China; renamed Heng Yang she became a training ship and remained in service until the 1960s when she was scrapped.

== Design and description ==
Designed for ease of production, the Matsu class was smaller, slower and more lightly armed than previous destroyers as the IJN intended them for second-line duties like escorting convoys, releasing the larger ships for missions with the fleet. The ships measured 100 meters (328 ft 1 in) long overall, with a beam of 9.35 meters (30 ft 8 in) and a draft of 3.3 meters (10 ft 10 in). Their crew numbered 210 officers and enlisted men. They displaced 1,282 metric tons (1,262 long tons) at standard load and 1,554 metric tons (1,529 long tons) at deep load. The ships had two Kampon geared steam turbines, each driving one propeller shaft, using steam provided by two Kampon water-tube boilers. The turbines were rated at a total of 19,000 shaft horsepower (14,000 kW) for a speed of 27.8 knots (51.5 km/h; 32.0 mph). The Matsus had a range of 4,680 nautical miles (8,670 km; 5,390 mi) at 16 knots (30 km/h; 18 mph).

The main armament of the Matsu-class ships consisted of three 127-millimeter (5 in) Type 89 dual-purpose guns in one twin-gun mount aft and one single mount forward of the superstructure. The single mount was partially protected against spray by a gun shield. The accuracy of the Type 89 guns was severely reduced against aircraft because no high-angle gunnery director was fitted. The ships carried a total of twenty-five 25-millimeter (1 in) Type 96 anti-aircraft guns in 4 triple and 13 single mounts. The Matsus were equipped with Type 13 early-warning and Type 22 surface-search radars. The ships were also armed with a single rotating quadruple mount amidships for 610-millimeter (24 in) torpedoes. They could deliver their 36 depth charges via two stern rails and two throwers.

== Construction and career ==
Authorized in the late 1942 Modified 5th Naval Armaments Supplement Program, Kaede (maple) was laid down on 4 March 1944 at the Yokosuka Naval Arsenal and launched on 25 July. Upon her completion on 30 October, Kaede was assigned to Destroyer Squadron 11 of the Combined Fleet for training. At the completion of training on 20 January 1945, the ship was assigned to Destroyer Division 52, part of Escort Squadron 31. On 22–27 January, she escorted a convoy from Moji to Hong Kong and then sailed to Takao (modern Kaohsiung), Taiwan. There Kaede joined her sister Ume and the destroyer Shiokaze on a voyage to the Aparri area of the island of Luzon in the Philippines to evacuate stranded aircrew on 30 January. The following day the ships were attacked by North American B-25 bombers of the 822d Bombardment Squadron which damaged all three ships. Kaede was set on fire and badly damaged by a bomb hit that killed forty men and injured thirty. She returned to Takao for emergency repairs that were not finished until 21 February when she steamed to Kure for permanent repairs.

The ship was turned over to Allied forces at Kure at the time of the surrender of Japan on 2 September and was stricken from the navy list on 5 October. The destroyer was disarmed and used to repatriate Japanese personnel in 1945–1947 after repairs. Kaede was turned over to the Republic of China Navy on 6 July of the latter year and was renamed Heng Yang. Never rearmed or recommissioned, the ship was hulked and was classified as a training ship on 1 October 1949. She was stricken in 1960 and scrapped two years later.

== Bibliography ==
- Dodson, Aidan & Cant, Serena (2020). Spoils of War: The Fate of Enemy Fleets after Two World Wars. Barnsley, UK: Seaforth Publishing. ISBN 978-1-5267-4198-1.
- Futrell, Frank (1983). "Luzon". In Craven, Wesley & Cate, James (eds.). The Pacific: Matterhorn to Nagasaki: June 1944 to August 1945 (PDF). The Army Air Forces in World War II. Washington, D.C.: Office of Air Force History. OCLC 314452548.
- Jentschura, Hansgeorg; Jung, Dieter & Mickel, Peter (1977). Warships of the Imperial Japanese Navy, 1869–1945. Annapolis, Maryland: United States Naval Institute. ISBN 0-87021-893-X.
- Nevitt, Allyn D. (1998). "IJN Kaede: Tabular Record of Movement". www.combinedfleet.com.
- Stille, Mark (2013). Imperial Japanese Navy Destroyers 1919–45 (2): Asahio to Tachibana Classes. Botley, UK: Osprey Publishing. ISBN 978-1-84908-987-6.
- Sturton, Ian (1980). "Japan". In Chesneau, Roger (ed.). Conway's All the World's Fighting Ships 1922–1946. Greenwich, UK: Conway Maritime Press. ISBN 0-85177-146-7.
- Whitley, M. J. (1988). Destroyers of World War Two: An International Encyclopedia. Annapolis, Maryland: Naval Institute Press. ISBN 0-87021-326-1.
