= Michael J. Whitley =

American historian

Michael J Whitley (died 2000) or Mike J Whitley was a naval historian with a particular interest in the Kriegsmarine, who wrote and maintained several reference works on warships. He was the son of Herbert and Marguerite Whitley and married to Rita. Whitley died in a diving accident in 2000.

== Selected publications ==
- Battleships of World War Two: An International Encyclopedia, Weidenfeld Military, 2001, ISBN 0-304-35957-2.
- Cruisers of World War Two: An International Encyclopedia, Naval Institute Press, 1996, ISBN 1-55750-141-6.
- Destroyers of World War Two, US Naval Institute Press, 2000, ISBN 0-87021-326-1.
- German Capital Ships of World War Two, Cassell, 2001, ISBN 0-304-35707-3.
- German Cruisers of World War Two, Naval Institute Press, 1985, ISBN 0-87021-217-6.
- German Destroyers of World War Two, US Naval Institute Press, 1992, ISBN 1-55750-302-8.
- German Coastal Forces of World War Two, Arms & Armour, 1993, ISBN 1-85409-085-2.
