= Japanese destroyer Yanagi (1944) =

Japanese Matsu-class escort destroyers

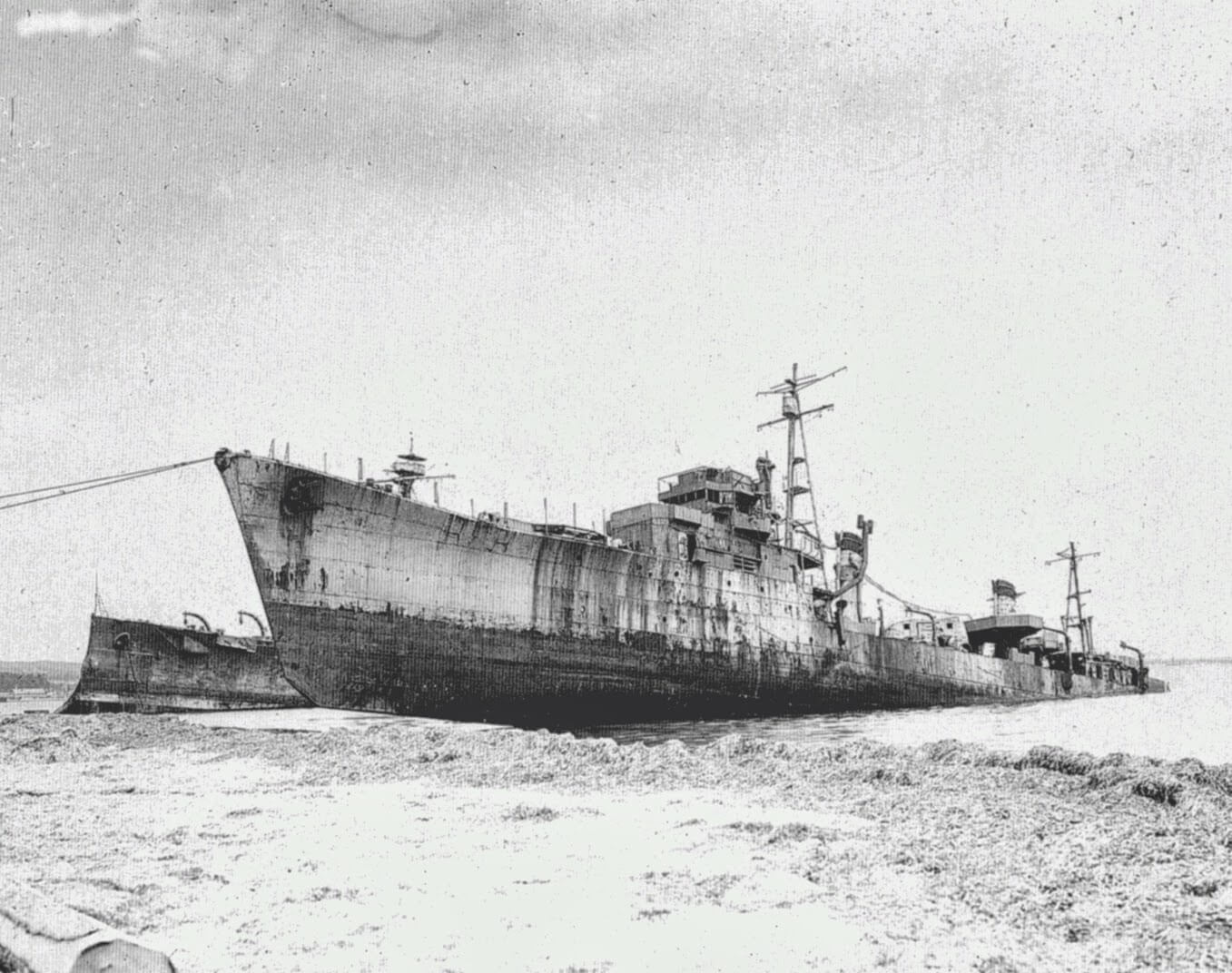
- The grounded wrecks of Yanagi and Tokiwa (left) at Ōminato, 1945

History

Empire of Japan
- Name: Yanagi
- Namesake: Willow
- Ordered: 1942
- Builder: Fujinagata Shipyards, Osaka
- Laid down: 20 August 1944
- Launched: 25 November 1944
- Completed: 18 January 1945
- Stricken: 20 November 1945
- Fate: Scrapped April 1947

General characteristics (as built)
- Class & type: Matsu-class escort destroyer
- Displacement: 1,282 t (1,262 long tons) (standard)
- Length: 100 m (328 ft 1 in) (o/a)
- Beam: 9.35 m (30 ft 8 in)
- Draft: 3.3 m (10 ft 10 in)
- Installed power: 2 × water-tube boilers; 19,000 shp (14,000 kW)
- Propulsion: 2 shafts, 2 × geared steam turbines
- Speed: 27.8 knots (51.5 km/h; 32.0 mph)
- Range: 4,680 nmi (8,670 km; 5,390 mi) at 16 knots (30 km/h; 18 mph)
- Complement: 210
- Sensors & processing systems: 1 × Type 22 search radar; 1 × Type 13 early-warning radar
- Armament: 1 × twin, 1 × single 127 mm (5 in) DP guns; 4 × triple, 13 × single 25 mm (1 in) AA guns; 1 × quadruple 610 mm (24 in) torpedo tubes; 2 × rails, 2 × throwers for 36 depth charges

Yanagi (柳; "Willow") was one of 18 Matsu-class escort destroyers built for the Imperial Japanese Navy (IJN) during World War II. Completed in early 1945, the ship was deployed to northern Japan for convoy escort duties in May. She was badly damaged during the American attacks on Hokkaido and northern Honshu in mid-July and was further damaged when they repeated those attacks on 9 August. Yanagi was used as a breakwater in May 1948.

== Design and description ==
Designed for ease of production, the Matsu class was smaller, slower and more lightly armed than previous destroyers as the IJN intended them for second-line duties like escorting convoys, releasing the larger ships for missions with the fleet. The ships measured 100 meters (328 ft 1 in) long overall, with a beam of 9.35 meters (30 ft 8 in) and a draft of 3.3 meters (10 ft 10 in). Their crew numbered 210 officers and enlisted men. They displaced 1,282 metric tons (1,262 long tons) at standard load and 1,554 metric tons (1,529 long tons) at deep load. The ships had two Kampon geared steam turbines, each driving one propeller shaft, using steam provided by two Kampon water-tube boilers. The turbines were rated at a total of 19,000 shaft horsepower (14,000 kW) for a speed of 27.8 knots (51.5 km/h; 32.0 mph). The Matsus had a range of 4,680 nautical miles (8,670 km; 5,390 mi) at 16 knots (30 km/h; 18 mph).

The main armament of the Matsu-class ships consisted of three 127-millimeter (5 in) Type 89 dual-purpose guns in one twin-gun mount aft and one single mount forward of the superstructure. The single mount was partially protected against spray by a gun shield. The accuracy of the Type 89 guns was severely reduced against aircraft because no high-angle gunnery director was fitted. The ships carried a total of twenty-five 25-millimeter (1 in) Type 96 anti-aircraft guns in 4 triple and 13 single mounts. The Matsus were equipped with Type 13 early-warning and Type 22 surface-search radars. The ships were also armed with a single rotating quadruple mount amidships for 610-millimeter (24 in) torpedoes. They could deliver their 36 depth charges via two stern rails and two throwers.

== Construction and career ==
Authorized in the late 1942 Modified 5th Naval Armaments Supplement Program, Yanagi (willow) was laid down by Fujinagata Shipyards on 20 August 1944 in its Osaka facility and launched on 25 November. Upon her completion on 18 January 1945, the ship was assigned to Destroyer Squadron 11 of the Combined Fleet for working up. Upon the completion of her training, the ship was assigned to the squadron's Destroyer Division 53. The squadron was briefly attached to the Second Fleet on 1–20 April before rejoining the Combined Fleet.

On 22 May, Yanagi was transferred to the Ominato area for convoy escort duties. During attacks by Task Force 38 on Hokkaido and northern Honshu on 14 July, the ship had her stern blown off when she was attacked by carrier aircraft in the Tsugaru Strait. Her crew casualties are unknown, but the destroyer was towed to Ominato. Destroyer Division 53 was disbanded the following day. Yanagi was still in Ominato when Task Force 38 conducted further attacks in the Hokkaido area on 9–10 August and was further damaged. The ship was turned over to Allied forces at Hakodate at the time of the surrender of Japan on 2 September and was stricken from the navy list on 20 November without being used in repatriation duties. Unrepaired, she was dismantled at Ominato on 1 April 1947.

Some sources suggest the ship was used as a breakwater in May 1948 in Wakamatsu-ku, alongside Akizuki-class destroyers Suzutsuki and Fuyutsuki. In reality, the vessel used was the first Yanagi, an old Momo-class destroyer built in 1917 that was decommissioned in 1940 and survived the Pacific War as a training hulk.

== Bibliography ==
- Jentschura, Hansgeorg; Jung, Dieter & Mickel, Peter (1977). Warships of the Imperial Japanese Navy, 1869–1945. Annapolis, Maryland: United States Naval Institute. ISBN 0-87021-893-X.
- Nevitt, Allyn D. (1998). "IJN Yanagi: Tabular Record of Movement". www.combinedfleet.com.
- Rohwer, Jürgen (2005). Chronology of the War at Sea 1939–1945: The Naval History of World War Two (Third Revised ed.). Annapolis, Maryland: Naval Institute Press. ISBN 1-59114-119-2.
- Stille, Mark (2013). Imperial Japanese Navy Destroyers 1919–45 (2): Asahio to Tachibana Classes. Botley, UK: Osprey Publishing. ISBN 978-1-84908-987-6.
- Sturton, Ian (1980). "Japan". In Chesneau, Roger (ed.). Conway's All the World's Fighting Ships 1922–1946. Greenwich, UK: Conway Maritime Press. ISBN 0-85177-146-7.
- Whitley, M. J. (1988). Destroyers of World War Two: An International Encyclopedia. Annapolis, Maryland: Naval Institute Press. ISBN 0-87021-326-1.
