= Kongō-class battlecruiser =

Japanese class of four battlecruisers

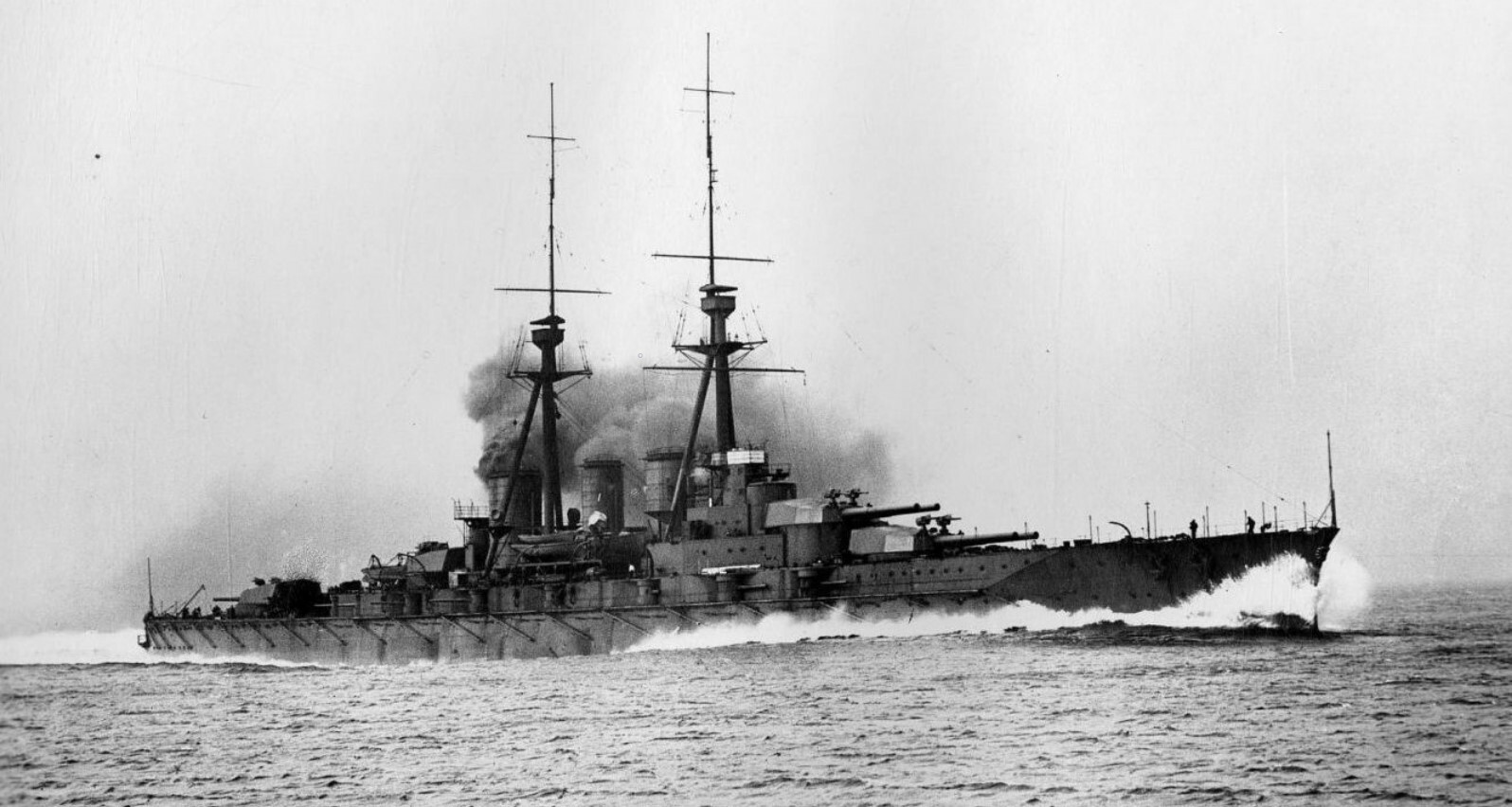
- Kongō in May 1913

Class overview
- Builders: Vickers, Barrow-in-Furness; Yokosuka Naval Arsenal, Yokosuka; Mitsubishi Shipyard Co., Nagasaki; Kawasaki Dockyard Co., Kobe
- Operators: Imperial Japanese Navy
- Preceded by: Ibuki class
- Succeeded by: Amagi class (planned)
- Built: 1911–1915
- In commission: 1913–1945
- Planned: 4
- Completed: 4
- Lost: 4

General characteristics (Haruna as built)
- Type: Battlecruiser
- Displacement: 27,384 tonnes (26,952 long tons)
- Length: 214.58 m (704 ft 0 in)
- Beam: 28.04 m (92 ft 0 in)
- Draft: 8.22 m (27 ft 0 in)
- Installed power: 64,000 shp (48,000 kW); 36 × Yarrow boilers
- Propulsion: 4 shafts; 2 × steam turbine sets
- Speed: 27.5 knots (50.9 km/h; 31.6 mph)
- Range: 8,000 nmi (15,000 km; 9,200 mi) at 14 knots (26 km/h; 16 mph)
- Complement: 1,193
- Armament: 4 × twin 356 mm guns (Vickers 14 inch/45 naval gun); 16 × single 152 mm guns; 4 × single 76 mm AA guns; 8 × 533 mm (21.0 in) torpedo tubes
- Armor: Waterline belt: 203–76 mm (8–3 in); Deck: 25 mm (1 in); Gun turrets: 229–254 mm (9.0–10.0 in); Barbettes: 254–76 mm (10–3 in); Conning tower: 229 mm (9.0 in)?

General characteristics (Haruna, 1945)
- Type: Fast battleship
- Displacement: 32,156 tonnes (31,648 long tons) (standard)
- Length: 219.61 m (720 ft 6 in)
- Beam: 33.1 m (108 ft 7 in)
- Installed power: 136,000 shp (101,000 kW); 11 × water-tube boilers
- Propulsion: 4 × steam turbines
- Speed: 30.5 knots (56.5 km/h; 35.1 mph)
- Range: 10,000 nmi (19,000 km; 12,000 mi) at 18 knots (33 km/h; 21 mph)
- Complement: 1,500+
- Sensors & processing systems: 1 × Type 21 air search radar; 2 × Type 13 early warning radar; 2 × Type 22 surface search radar
- Armament: 4 × twin 356 mm guns; 8 × single 152 mm guns; 6 × twin 127 mm (5 in)/40 dual-purpose guns; 118 × Type 96 25 mm (0.98 in) AA guns; 30 × depth charges
- Armor: Deck: 120–80 mm (4.7–3.1 in); Barbettes: 343 mm (13.5 in)
- Aircraft carried: 3 × floatplanes
- Aviation facilities: 1 × catapult

The Kongō-class battlecruiser (金剛型巡洋戦艦, Kongō-gata jun'yōsenkan) was a class of four battlecruisers (later reclassified fast battleships) built for the Imperial Japanese Navy (IJN) immediately before World War I. Designed by British naval architect George Thurston, the lead ship of the class, Kongō, was the last Japanese capital ship constructed outside Japan, by Vickers at Barrow-in-Furness. Her sister ships, Haruna, Kirishima and Hiei, were all completed in Japan.

During the late 1920s, all but Hiei were reconstructed and reclassified as battleships. After the signing of the London Naval Treaty in 1930, Hiei was reconfigured as a training ship to avoid being scrapped. Following Japan's withdrawal from the treaty, all four underwent a massive second reconstruction in the late 1930s. Following the completion of these modifications, which increased top speeds to over 30 knots (56 km/h; 35 mph), all four were reclassified as fast battleships. The threat of the Kongō-class on American lines of communication and logistics leading up to World War II highly influenced the U.S. Navy's decision to order the Iowa-class fast battleships.

The Kongō-class battleships were the most active capital ships of the Japanese Navy during World War II, participating in most major engagements of the war. Hiei and Kirishima acted as escorts during the attack on Pearl Harbor, while Kongō and Haruna supported the invasion of Singapore. All four participated in the battles of Midway and Guadalcanal. Hiei and Kirishima were both lost during the Naval Battle of Guadalcanal in November 1942, while Haruna and Kongō jointly bombarded the American Henderson Field airbase on Guadalcanal. The two remaining Kongō-class battleships spent most of 1943 shuttling between Japanese naval bases before participating in the major naval campaigns of 1944. Haruna and Kongō engaged American surface vessels during the Battle of Leyte Gulf in late October 1944. Kongō was torpedoed and sunk by the submarine USS Sealion in November 1944, while Haruna was sunk at her moorings by an air attack in Kure Naval Base in late July 1945, but later raised and scrapped in 1946.

== Design ==
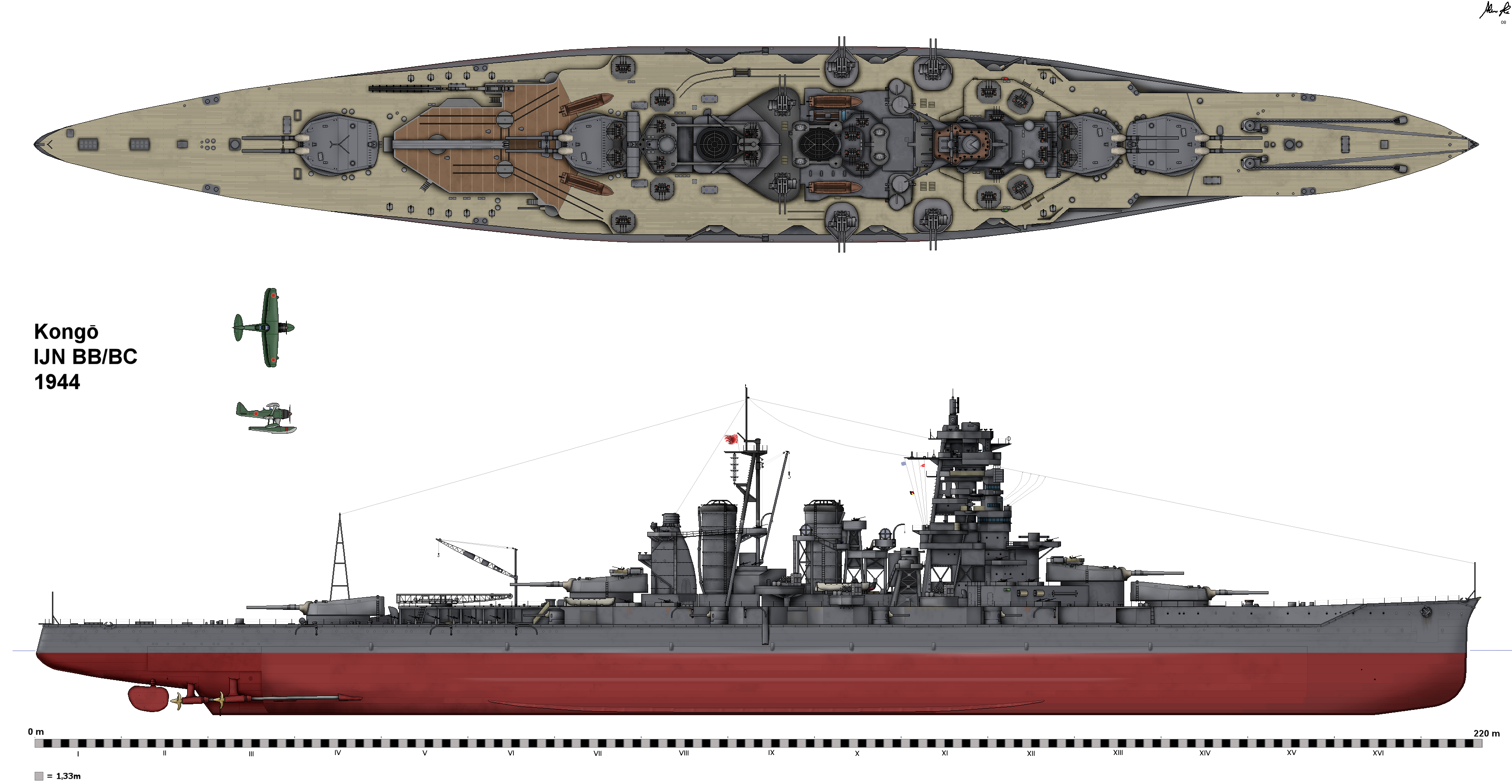
Kongō as she appeared in 1944.

The design of the Kongō-class battlecruisers came about as a result of the IJN's modernization programs, as well as the perceived need to compete with the British Royal Navy.

In April 1907, the Royal Navy launched HMS Invincible at Newcastle upon Tyne. Armed with eight 12-inch (30.5 cm) main guns, Invincible rendered all current—and designed—Japanese capital ships obsolete by comparison. In 1911, the Japanese Diet passed the Emergency Naval Expansion Bill, authorizing the construction of one battleship (Fusō) and four armoured cruisers, to be designed by British naval architect George Thurston. In his design of the class, Thurston relied on many techniques that would eventually be used by the British on HMS Tiger.

Under the terms of the contract signed with Vickers in November 1910, one member of the Kongō class—the lead ship Kongō—was to be built in Britain and Vickers was to maximize the transfer of naval technology to Japan. The design of the ships was from Vickers Design 472C (corresponding to the Japanese design designation B-46). The original design featured ten 12-inch (304.8 mm) 50-calibre guns, sixteen 6-inch (152 mm) guns, and eight 21-inch (533 mm) torpedo tubes. Commander Katô Hirohasu pushed for the adoption of a new 14-inch (356 mm)/45 calibre gun that was currently under development. After trials of the new gun, which were witnessed by both the Japanese Navy and Royal Navy, the Japanese made the decision on 29 November 1911 to use the new gun despite the keel having already been laid down on 17 January 1911, and the resulting need to quickly make a large number of alterations to the design, so as to not prolong the construction. Due to the size of the guns, only 8 were installed

The final design of the battlecruisers resulted in an improved version of the Lion class, displacing an estimated 27,940 tonnes (27,500 long tons). It also called for eight 14-inch guns mounted in four twin gun turrets (two forward and two aft) with a top speed of 27.5 knots (50.9 km/h; 31.6 mph).

To ensure transfer of the latest design knowledge to Japan more than 100 technical specialists were sent on 18 months secondments from Japan to Vickers during the construction phase of Kongō. If superintendents, supervisors and trial witnesses are also included then about 200 Japanese spent time in Britain.

== Description ==
The ships had a length of 214.58 meters (704 ft 0 in) overall and a beam of 28.04 meters (92 ft 0 in). They had a draft of 8.22 meters (27 ft 0 in) and displaced 27,384 metric tons (26,952 long tons) at normal load.

=== Propulsion ===
The Kongō-class ships had two sets of Parsons direct-drive steam turbines, except for Haruna's Brown-Curtis turbines, each of which drove two propeller shafts. The high-pressure turbines drove the wing shafts while the low-pressure turbines drove the inner shafts. The turbines were arranged in two compartments, separated by a centerline longitudinal bulkhead; both compartments were situated between turrets No. 3 and 4. They were designed to produce a total of 65,000 shaft horsepower (48,000 kW), using steam provided by 36 Yarrow or Kampon water-tube boilers, with working pressures ranging from 17.1 to 19.2 atm (1,733 to 1,945 kPa; 251 to 282 psi). The boilers, arranged in eight compartments, were mixed-firing with fuel oil sprayed onto the coal for extra power. The ships had a stowage capacity of 4,200 long tons (4,267 t) of coal and 1,000 long tons (1,016 t) of oil, giving them a range of 8,000 nautical miles (15,000 km; 9,200 mi) at a speed of 14 knots (26 km/h; 16 mph). The battlecruisers were designed to reach a speed of 27.5 knots (50.9 km/h; 31.6 mph) and all of them exceeded that speed on their sea trials. The Kongō and Hiei attained 27.54 knots (51.00 km/h; 31.69 mph) and 27.72 knots (51.34 km/h; 31.90 mph) with 78,275 shp (58,370 kW) and 76,127 shp (56,768 kW), respectively.

In their first reconstruction during the late 1920s, the ships were reboilered with 10, 11 (Hiei) or 16 (Haruna) Kampon boilers, and their fuel stowage was rearranged to accommodate 2,661 long tons (2,704 t) of coal and 3,292 long tons (3,345 t) of oil. This increased their range to 8,930 nautical miles (16,540 km; 10,280 mi) at 14 knots and allowed the fore funnel to be removed, which greatly decreased smoke interference with the bridge and fire-control systems. Coupled with the addition of external torpedo bulges, this reduced their speed to 26 knots (48 km/h; 30 mph) and caused the IJN to reclassify them as battleships. During their 1930s reconstructions into fast battleships, the existing boilers were removed and replaced with eleven oil-fired Kampon boilers. These upgraded boilers gave the Kongō and her sister ships much greater power, with the ships of the class capable of speeds exceeding 30.5 knots (56.5 km/h; 35.1 mph). This made them the only Japanese battleships at the time fully suited to operations alongside fast aircraft carriers.

=== Armament ===
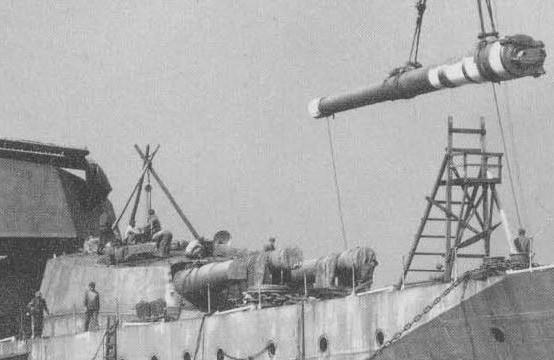
A 14-inch gun being installed aboard Haruna, October 1914

The primary armament of the Kongō class consisted of eight 14"/45 guns, mounted in four superfiring twin-gun turrets. The turrets had an elevation capability of −5/+20 degrees, except in Kongō, whose turrets had a maximum elevation capability of +25 degrees. The shells could be loaded at any angle and the guns had a firing cycle of 30–40 seconds. These guns and their turrets underwent multiple modernizations throughout the ships' careers. During the first reconstruction of the class during the 1920s, the elevation of the main guns was increased to a maximum of +33 degrees. The recoil mechanism of the guns was also changed from a hydraulic to pneumatic system, which allowed for a faster firing cycle of the main guns.

By World War II, the guns used Type 91 armor-piercing, capped shells. Each of these shells weighed 673.5 kilograms (1,485 lb) and had a muzzle velocity of 775 meters per second (2,540 ft/s). They had a maximum range of 25,000 meters (27,000 yd) at +20 degrees of elevation and 35,450 meters (38,770 yd) at +33 degrees after modernisation. Also available was a 625-kilogram (1,378 lb) high-explosive shell that had a muzzle velocity of 805 meters per second (2,640 ft/s). A special Type 3 Sanshikidan incendiary shrapnel shell was developed in the 1930s for anti-aircraft use.

As built, the Kongō class was fitted with a secondary armament of sixteen 15 cm/50 guns mounted in single casemates along the sides of the hull at the level of the upper deck. Eight guns were mounted per side, and each had an arc of fire of 130 degrees and a maximum elevation of +15 degrees. Each gun could fire a 45.36-kilogram (100 lb) high explosive projectile a maximum distance of 22,970 yards (21,000 m) at a rate of between four and six shots per minute. During their reconstruction in the 1930s, the maximum elevation of the guns was increased to +30 degrees, which increased their maximum range by approximately 900 metres (980 yd).

The ships also mounted four 76 mm/40 anti-aircraft (AA) guns. The 76-millimetre (3 in) high-angle guns were in single mounts. Each of these guns had a maximum elevation of +75 degrees, and could fire a 6 kg (13 lb) projectile with a muzzle velocity of 680 m/s (2,200 ft/s) to a maximum height of 7,500 metres (24,600 ft). Both ships were equipped with eight submerged 533-millimetre (21.0 in) torpedo tubes, four on each broadside.

The Kongō class's secondary armament changed significantly over time. During the modernizations of the 1930s, all of the 76 mm guns were replaced with eight 127 mm (5 in)/40 dual-purpose guns. These guns were fitted on both sides of the fore and aft superstructures in four twin-gun mounts. When firing at surface targets, the guns had a range of 14,700 metres (16,100 yd); they had a maximum ceiling of 9,440 metres (30,970 ft) at their maximum elevation of +90 degrees. Their maximum rate of fire was 14 rounds a minute, but their sustained rate of fire was around eight rounds per minute. During reconstruction, the two foremost 152 mm guns were also removed.

The light AA armament of the Kongō class changed dramatically from 1933 to 1944. During the second reconstruction, the ships were fitted with four to eight twin 13.2 mm (0.52 in) machine-guns, later replaced by 25-millimeter (0.98 in) gun mounts. Both weapons were license-built French Hotchkiss designs. The 25 mm guns were mounted on the Kongō class in single, double, and triple mounts. This model was the standard Japanese light anti-aircraft gun during World War II, but severe design shortcomings rendered it largely ineffective. The twin and triple mounts "lacked sufficient speed in train or elevation; the gun sights were unable to handle fast targets; the gun exhibited excessive vibration; the magazine was too small, and, finally, the gun produced excessive muzzle blast". Haruna ultimately carried 118 guns in 30 triple, two twin, and 24 single mounts.

=== Armour ===
The Kongō-class battlecruisers were designed with the intention of maximizing speed and maneuverability, and as such were not as heavily armoured as later Japanese capital ships. Nevertheless, the Kongō class possessed significant quantities of armour, and were heavily upgraded during their modernizations. In their initial configuration, the Kongō class possessed an upper belt that was 6 inches (152 mm) thick, and a lower belt with a thickness of 8 inches (203 mm). Vickers Cemented was used in the construction of the Kongō, while the original armour of the other three was constructed of a variation of Krupp Cemented Armour, designed by the German Krupp Arms Works. Subsequent developments of Japanese armour technology relied upon a hybrid design of the two variations until drastic changes were made during the design of the Yamato-class battleship in 1938. The armoured belt near the bow and stern of the vessels was strengthened with an additional 3 inches (76 mm) of cemented armour. The conning tower of the Kongō class was very heavily armoured, with variations of Krupp Cemented Armour up to 14 inches (360 mm) thick. The turrets were lightly armoured compared to later designs, with a maximum plate thickness of 9 inches (229 mm). The deck armour ranged from 1.5 to 2.75 inches (38 to 70 mm).

During the reconstructions that each ship underwent during the interwar period, most of the armour of the Kongō class was heavily upgraded. The main lower belt was strengthened to be a uniform thickness of 8 inches, while diagonal bulkheads of a depth ranging from 5 to 8 inches (127 to 203 mm) reinforced the main armoured belt. The upper belt remained unchanged, but was closed by 9-inch bulkheads at the bow and stern of the ships. The turret armour was strengthened to 10 inches (254 mm), while 4 inches (102 mm) were added to portions of the deck armour. The armour upgrades increased the displacement by close to 4,000 tons on each ship, violating the terms of the Washington Treaty. Even after these modifications, the armour capacity of the Kongō class remained much less than that of newer capital ships, a factor which played a major role in the sinking of Hiei and Kirishima at the hands of U.S. Navy cruisers and battleships in 1942.

== Ships ==
Construction data
Ship	Builder	Laid down	Launched	Completed	Fate
Kongō	Vickers, Barrow-in-Furness	17 January 1911	18 May 1912	16 August 1913	Torpedoed and sunk by the submarine USS Sealion, 21 November 1944
Hiei	Yokosuka Naval Arsenal, Yokosuka	4 November 1911	21 November 1912	4 August 1914	Crippled by the heavy cruisers USS San Francisco and USS Portland. Scuttled following air attacks during the Naval Battle of Guadalcanal, 13 November 1942
Kirishima	Mitsubishi Shipyard Co., Nagasaki	17 March 1912	1 December 1913	19 April 1915	Sunk by the battleship USS Washington during the Naval Battle of Guadalcanal, 15 November 1942
Haruna	Kawasaki Dockyard Co., Kobe	16 March 1912	14 December 1913	19 April 1915	Sunk in port by US aircraft, 28 July 1945; broken up from 1946

Due to a lack of available slipways, the latter two were the first Japanese warships to be built by Japanese private shipyards. Completed by 1915, they were considered the first modern battlecruisers of the Imperial Japanese Navy. According to naval historian Robert Jackson, they "outclassed all other contemporary [capital] ships".

=== Kongō ===
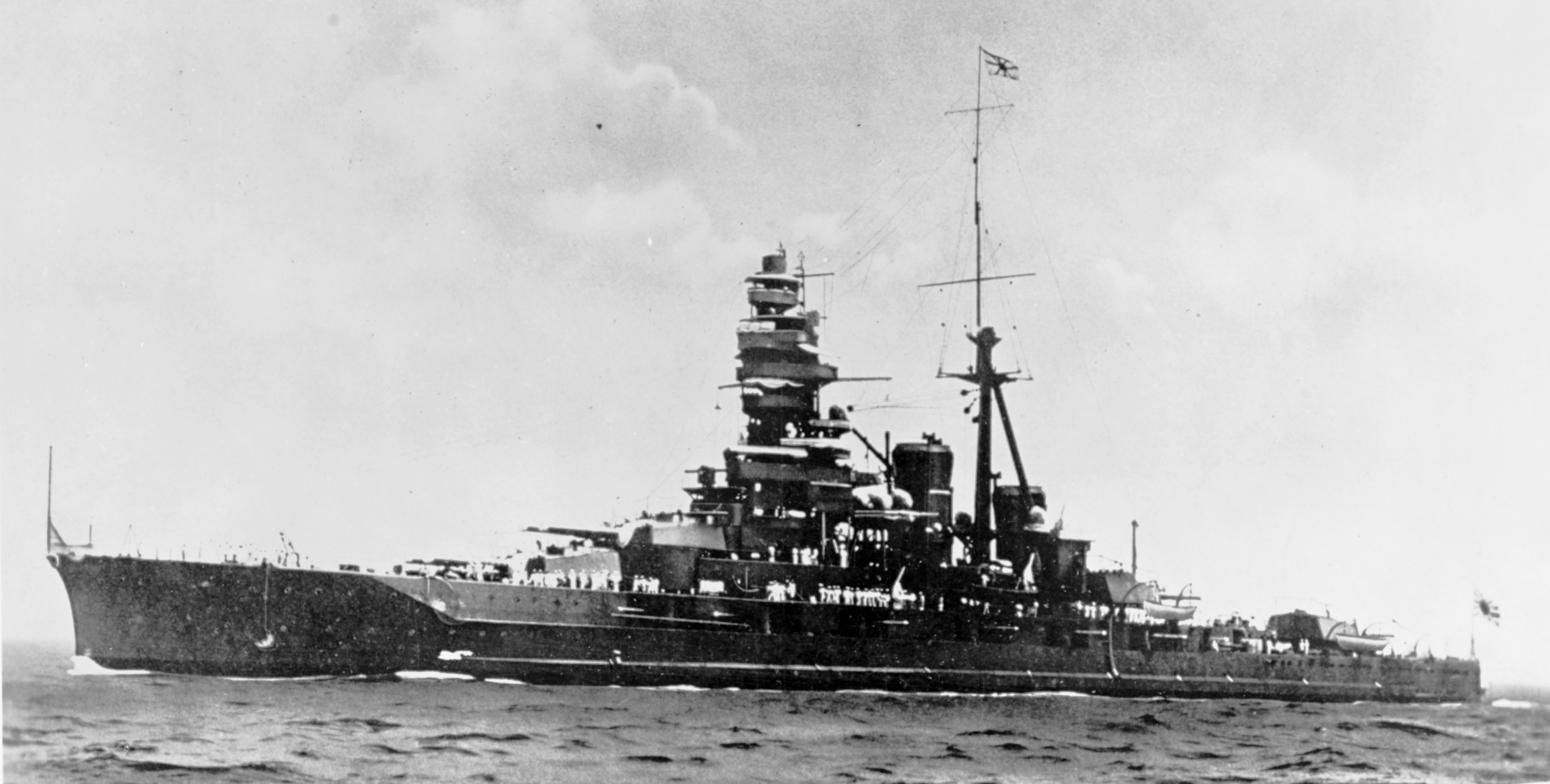
Kongō following her first reconstruction

Kongō was laid down 17 January 1911 at Barrow-in-Furness, England, launched 18 May 1912, and commissioned 16 August 1913. She arrived in Yokosuka via Singapore in November 1913 to undergo armaments sighting checks in Kure Naval Arsenal, being placed in reserve upon her arrival. On 23 August 1914, Japan formally declared war on the German Empire as part of her contribution to the Anglo-Japanese Alliance, and Kongō was deployed near Midway Island to patrol the communications lines of the Pacific Ocean, attached to the Third Battleship Division of the First Fleet. Following the 1922 Washington Naval Treaty, Kongō and her contemporaries (including the ships in the Nagato, Ise and Fusō classes) were the only Japanese capital ships to avoid the scrapyard. On 1 November 1924, Kongō docked at Yokosuka for modifications which improved fire control and main-gun elevation, and increased her antiaircraft armament. In September 1929, she began her first major reconstruction. Her horizontal armour, boilers, and machinery space were all improved, and she was equipped to carry Type 90 Model 0 floatplanes. (Note: Sources disagree on the reconstruction's beginning and ending dates. Whitley gives 20 October 1928 to 20 September 1931, but Kongo's Combined Fleet Tabular Record of Movement gives dates of September 1929 to 31 March 1931, and Breyer agrees with a range of September 1929 to March 1931.) When her reconstruction was completed on 31 March 1931, she was reclassified as a battleship. From October 1933 to November 1934, Kongō was the flagship of the Japanese Combined Fleet, before being placed in reserve when the flag was transferred to Yamashiro.

On 1 June 1935, Kongō's second reconstruction began. (Note: As with the first, sources disagree as to the exact dates of the second reconstruction. While Whitley and Combined Fleet agree on a starting date of 1 June 1935, Breyer uses January 1936; all sources agree that it ended in January 1937, but Breyer uses a more general "January 1937", rather than the exact date given by Whitley and Combined Fleet.) Japan's withdrawal from the London Naval Treaty led to reconstruction of her forward tower to fit the pagoda mast style of design, improvements to the boilers and turbines, and reconfiguration of the aircraft catapults aft of Turret 3. Her new top speed of 30 knots (35 mph; 56 km/h) qualified her as a fast battleship. The modifications were completed on 8 January 1937. In either August or November 1941, she was assigned to the Third Battleship Division with her three sister ships, and sailed on 29 November as part of the main body—four fast battleships, three heavy cruisers, eight destroyers—for the Japanese invasion of Malaya and Singapore. Following the destruction of the British Force Z, the Main Body departed for French Indochina, before escorting a fast carrier task force in February during the invasion of the Dutch East Indies. Kongō provided cover for Japanese carriers during attacks on the Dutch East Indies in February and Ceylon in March and April. Kongō and Hiei were part of the Second Fleet Main Body during the Battle of Midway, but were diverted north on 9 June to assist in the invasion of the Aleutian Islands. Kongō and her sisters engaged American naval forces in the Battle of Guadalcanal. During this engagement Kongō and Haruna bombarded Henderson Field with 430 14-inch and 33 6-inch shells on 13 October 1942. Following armament and armour upgrades in late 1943 and early 1944, Kongō sailed as part of Admiral Jisaburō Ozawa's Mobile Fleet during the Battle of the Philippine Sea. During the Battle of Leyte Gulf, Kongō sortied as part of Admiral Kurita's Center Force, seeing her only ship vs ship engagement at the Battle off Samar. During the engagement, Kongō sank the destroyer escort Samuel B. Roberts, and helped to sink the destroyer Hoel. Kongō also allegedly scored hits to the escort carrier Gambier Bay and the destroyer Johnston, sinking or helping to sink both ships, though as it would turn out these hits were misattributed to her and belonged to the battleship Yamato.

Kongō and an escort, Urakaze, were sunk northwest of Taiwan on 21 November 1944 by the submarine USS Sealion, after being hit on the port bow by two or three torpedoes. Approximately 1,200 of her crew—including her Captain and the commander of the Third Battleship Division, Vice Admiral Yoshio Suzuki—were lost. She was removed from the Navy List on 20 January 1945.

=== Hiei ===
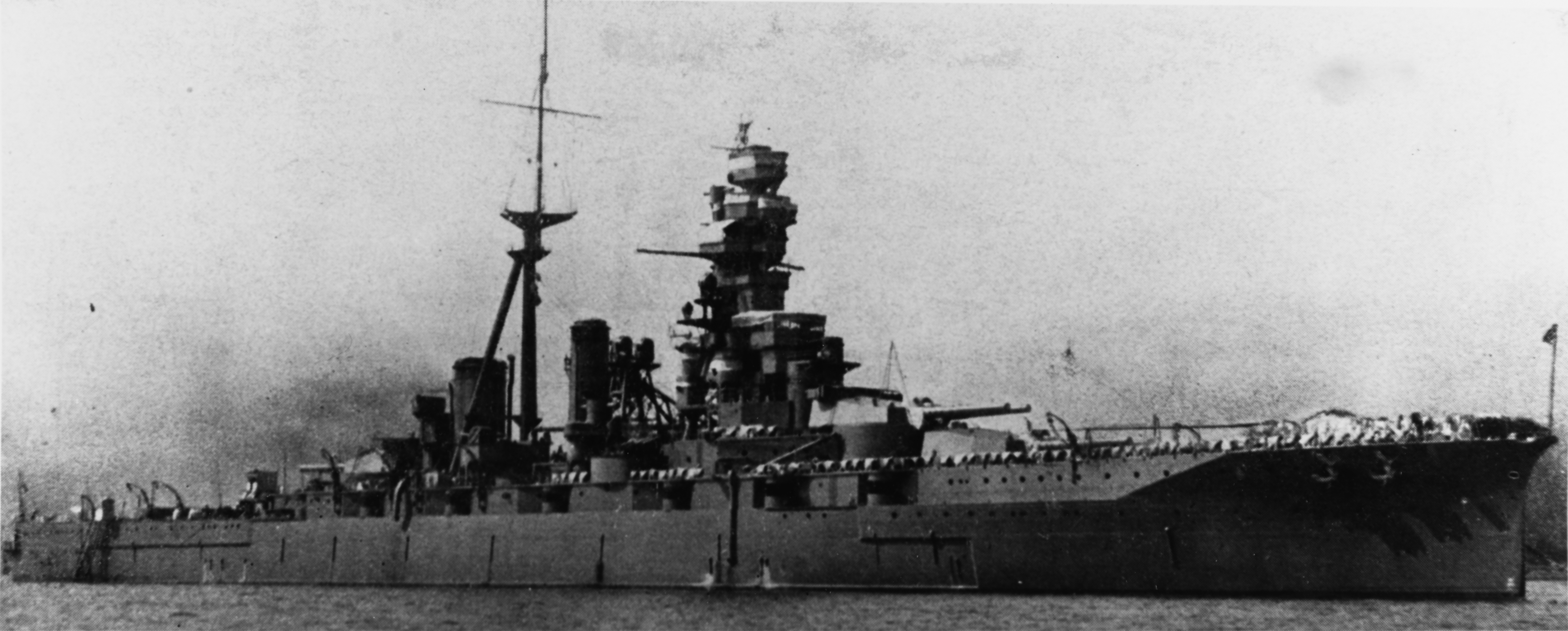
Hiei in 1933, as a training ship

Hiei was laid down at Yokosuka Naval Arsenal on 4 November 1911, launched 21 November 1912, and commissioned at Sasebo 4 August 1914, attached to the Third Battleship Division of the First Fleet. After conducting patrols off China and in the East China Sea during World War I, Hiei was placed in reserve in 1920. After undergoing minor reconstructions in 1924 and 1927, Hiei was demilitarized in 1929 to avoid being scrapped under the terms of the Washington Treaty; she was converted to a training ship in Kure from 1929 to 1932. All of her armour and most of her armament were removed under the restrictions of the treaty and carefully preserved. In 1933, she was refitted as an Imperial Service Ship and—following further reconstruction in 1934—became the Emperor's ship in late 1935. In 1937, following Japan's withdrawal from the London Treaty, Hiei underwent a massive reconstruction along lines similar to those of her sister ships. (Note: Sources all disagree on the exact date. Whitley says 26 November 1936, Breyer says November 1936, and Combined Fleet gives 1 April 1937.) When the reconstruction was completed on 31 January 1940, Hiei was reclassified as a battleship. Hiei sailed in November 1941 as an escort of Vice-Admiral Chuichi Nagumo's carrier force which attacked Pearl Harbor. Hiei provided escort cover during carrier raids on Darwin in February 1942, before a joint engagement with Kirishima that sank an American destroyer in March. She participated in carrier actions against Ceylon and Midway Island, and was subsequently drydocked in July.

Following carrier escort duty during the Battles of the Eastern Solomons and Santa-Cruz, Hiei departed as the flagship of Rear Admiral Hiroaki Abe's Combat Division 11 to bombard Henderson Field on the night of 12–13 November 1942. When the fleet encountered Rear Admiral Daniel Callaghan's Task Group in Ironbottom Sound, the First Naval Battle of Guadalcanal ensued. In an extremely confusing melee, Hiei would sink the destroyers Monssen and Laffey and help to cripple the heavy cruiser San Francisco—killing two rear admirals in the process—but was hit by about 85 shells from the guns of cruisers and destroyers. In particular, San Francisco scored a pair of 8-inch (203 mm) hits that penetrated Hiei's belt and left her suffering a severe rudder jam, unable to maneuver. Abe transferred his flag to Kirishima, and the battleship was taken under tow by the same ship, but one of her rudders froze in the full starboard position. Over the next day, Hiei was attacked by American aircraft many different times. While trying to evade an attack at 14:00, Hiei lost her emergency rudder and began to show a list to stern and starboard. Hiei was scuttled northwest of Savo Island on the evening of 13 November by Japanese destroyers.

=== Kirishima ===
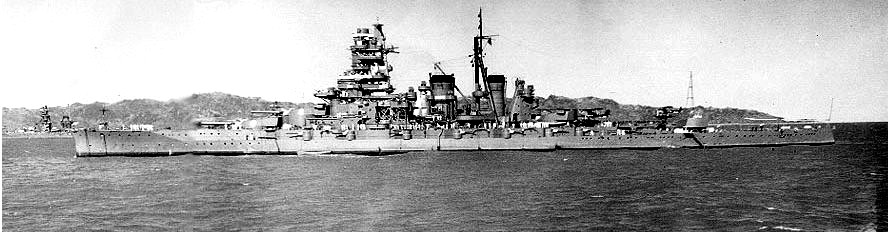
Kirishima off Amoy, China, in 1938

Kirishima's keel was laid in Mitsubishi's Nagasaki yard on 17 March 1912. She was launched about a year and a half later (1 December 1913) and transferred to Sasebo Naval Arsenal for fitting out. After her completion on 19 April 1915, she served off Japan, China and Korea's coasts during the First World War. After the war, she alternated between being based in Japan and patrolling off Japanese ports. On 14 September 1922, she collided with the destroyer Fuji, causing minor damage to both ships. Kirishima also assisted rescue efforts in the aftermath of the devastating 1923 Great Kantō earthquake, which destroyed most of Tokyo. After being sent to the reserve fleet in December 1923, she received a refit during 1924. Returning to the main fleet, the battlecruiser operated off China for periods of time in 1925–1926, until she returned to reserve from 1927 to 1931 in preparation for a major reconstruction. (Note: Sources disagree on the exact dates. While Conway's All the World's Fighting Ships says March 1927 to 31 March 1930, Kirishima's Combined Fleet Tabular Record of Movement states that it was from May 1927 to 16 April 1930.) Her superstructure was rebuilt, and she received extensive upgrades to armour, propulsion, and waterline bulges. After a period of fleet duty in the early 1930s, she underwent a two-year reconstruction (1934–1936) to rebuild her as a Fast Battleship. This upgrade improved her engine plant, redesigned the superstructure, lengthened the stern, and enabled her to equip floatplanes. After serving as a transport and support-ship during the Second Sino-Japanese War, Kirishima escorted the aircraft carrier strikeforce bound for the attack on Pearl Harbor in December 1941. Following the start of World War II, Kirishima served as an escort during carrier attacks on Port Darwin and the Dutch East Indies. Kirishima joined her sister ships in escorting naval sorties against Ceylon. She once again served escort duty during the disastrous Battle of Midway, before transferring to Truk Lagoon in preparation for operations against American landings on Guadalcanal. After participating in the Battles of the Eastern Solomons and Santa Cruz, Kirishima joined Hiei in a night attack on 13 November 1942. Following the loss of the latter on the evening of 13 November, Kirishima subsequently engaged American battleships on the night of 14/15 November. She managed to inflict superficial damage on USS South Dakota, but she was in turn caught off guard while attacking South Dakota and was crippled by USS Washington. With her engines largely disabled and listing heavily to starboard, Kirishima was abandoned in the early morning of 15 November 1942. She capsized and sank at 03:25 with the loss of 212 of her crew.

=== Haruna ===
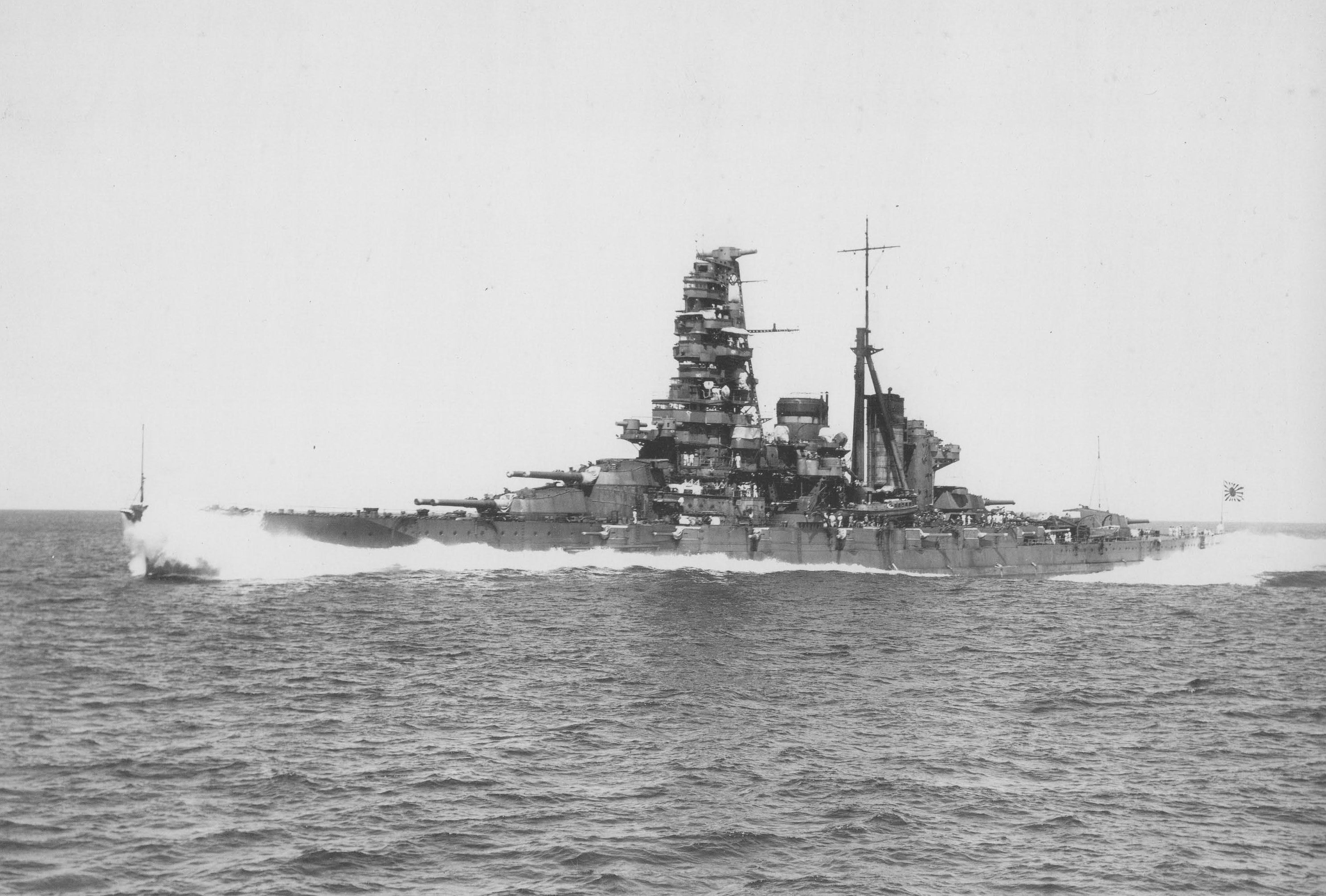
Haruna in 1934, following her second reconstruction

Haruna was laid down at Kobe by Kawasaki on 16 March 1912, launched 14 December 1913, and formally commissioned 19 April 1915. After a short patrolling duty off Sasebo, Haruna suffered a breech explosion during gunnery drills on 12 September 1920; seven crewmen were killed and the No. 1 turret badly damaged. After a long period of time in reserve, Haruna underwent her first modernization from 1926 to 1928. The process upgraded her propulsion capabilities, enabled her to carry and launch floatplanes, increasing her armour capacity by over 4,000 tons, and was shortly thereafter reclassified as a Battleship. She was overhauled a second time from 1933 to 1935, which additionally strengthened her armour and reclassified her as a fast battleship. During the Second Sino-Japanese War, Haruna primarily served as a large-scale troop transport for Japanese troops to mainland China. On the eve of the commencement of World War II, Haruna sailed as part of Vice-Admiral Nobutake Kondō's Southern Force. On 8 December 1941, Haruna provided heavy support for the invasion of Malaya and Singapore. She participated in the major Japanese offensives in the southern and southwestern Pacific in early 1942, before sailing as part of the carrier-strike force during the Battle of Midway. Haruna bombarded American positions at Henderson Field at Guadalcanal, and provided escort to carriers during the Solomon Islands campaign. In 1943, she deployed as part of a larger force on multiple occasions to counter the threat of American carrier strikes, but did not actively participate in a single battle. In 1944, Haruna was an escort during the Battle of the Philippine Sea and fought American surface vessels off Samar during the Battle of Leyte Gulf. She was the only one of the four battleships in her class to survive 1944. Haruna remained at Kure throughout 1945, where she was sunk by aircraft of Task Force 38 on 28 July 1945, after taking nine bomb hits at her moorings. She was subsequently raised and broken up for scrap in 1946.

== General references ==
- Boyle, David (1998). World War II in Photographs. London. Rebo Productions. ISBN 1-84053-089-8
- Breyer, Siegfried (1973). Battleships and Battle Cruisers, 1905–1970. Garden City, New York: Doubleday. OCLC 702840.
- Campbell, John (1985). Naval Weapons of World War II. Annapolis, Maryland: Naval Institute Press. ISBN 0-87021-459-4.
- Chihaya, Masataka & Abe, Yasuo (1971). IJN Kongo Battleship 1912–1944. Warship Profile. Vol. 12. Windsor, Berkshire, UK: Profile Publications.
- Evans, David C. & Peattie, Mark R. (1997). Kaigun: Strategy, Tactics, and Technology in the Imperial Japanese Navy, 1887–1941. Annapolis, Maryland: Naval Institute Press. ISBN 0-87021-192-7.
- Gardiner, Robert; Gray, Randal, eds. (1985). Conway's All the World's Fighting Ships 1906–1921. Annapolis, Maryland: Naval Institute Press. ISBN 0-87021-907-3.
- Jackson, Robert (editor) (2008). 101 Great Warships. London. Amber Books. ISBN 978-1-905704-72-9
- Jackson, Robert (2000). The World's Great Battleships. Brown Books. ISBN 1-897884-60-5
- Jentschura, Hansgeorg; Jung, Dieter & Mickel, Peter (1977). Warships of the Imperial Japanese Navy, 1869–1945. Annapolis, Maryland: United States Naval Institute. ISBN 0-87021-893-X.
- Lengerer, Hans (2012). "The Battlecruisers of the Kongô Class". In Jordan, John (ed.). Warship 2012. London: Conway. ISBN 978-1-84486-156-9.
- Lengerer, Hans (2025). "The Reconstruction of the Battle Fleet of the Imperial Japanese Navy Between the Wars, Part I". In Jordan, John (ed.). Warship 2025. London: Bloomsbury Publishing. pp. 8–21. ISBN 978-1-4728-6854-1.
- Lengerer, Hans & Ahlberg, Lars (2019). Capital Ships of the Imperial Japanese Navy 1868–1945: Ironclads, Battleships and Battle Cruisers: An Outline History of Their Design, Construction and Operations. Vol. I: Armourclad Fusō to Kongō Class Battle Cruisers. Zagreb, Croatia: Despot Infinitus. ISBN 978-953-8218-26-2.
- McCurtie, Francis (1989) [1945]. Jane's Fighting Ships of World War II. London: Bracken Books. ISBN 1-85170-194-X
- Moore, John (1990) [1919]. Jane's Fighting Ships of World War I. London: Studio Editions. ISBN 1-85170-378-0
- Parshall, Jonathan & Tully, Anthony (2007). Shattered Sword: The Untold Story of the Battle of Midway. Washington: Potomac Books. ISBN 978-1-57488-924-6.
- Preston, Antony (1972). Battleships of World War I: An Illustrated Encyclopedia of the Battleships of All Nations 1914–1918. New York: Galahad Books. ISBN 0-88365-300-1.
- Rohwer, Jurgen (2005). Chronology of the War at Sea, 1939–1945: The Naval History of World War Two. Annapolis, Maryland: Naval Institute Press. ISBN 1-59114-119-2.
- Sandler, Stanley (2004). Battleships: An Illustrated History of their Impact. Weapons and Warfare. Santa Barbara, California: ABC Clio. ISBN 1-85109-410-5.
- Schom, Alan (2004). The Eagle and the Rising Sun: The Japanese-American War, 1941–1943. Norton & Company. ISBN 9780393049244
- Silverstone, Paul H. (1984). Directory of the World's Capital Ships. New York: Hippocrene Books. ISBN 0-88254-979-0.
- Skulski, Janusz (1998). The Battleship Fusō: Anatomy of a Ship. London: Conway Maritime Press. ISBN 0-85177-665-5.
- Steinberg, Rafael (1980) Return to the Philippines. Time-Life Books Inc. ISBN 0-8094-2516-5
- Stille, Mark (2008). Imperial Japanese Navy Battleships 1941–1945. Oxford, UK: Osprey Publishing. ISBN 978-1-84603-280-6.
- Swanston, Alexander & Swanston, Malcolm (2007). The Historical Atlas of World War II. London: Cartographica Press Ltd. ISBN 0-7858-2200-3
- Whitley, M. J. (1998). Battleships of World War Two: An International Encyclopedia. Annapolis, Maryland: Naval Institute Press. ISBN 1-55750-184-X.
- Willmott, H.P. & Keegan, John [1999] (2002). The Second World War in the Far East. Smithsonian Books. ISBN 978-1588341921.
- Wiper, Steve (2001). Imperial Japanese Navy Kongo Class Battleships. Warship Pictorial. Vol. 13. Tucson, Arizona: Classic Warships Publishing. ISBN 0-9710687-1-2.
