= Japanese destroyer Sugi (1944) =

Japanese Matsu-class escort destroyers

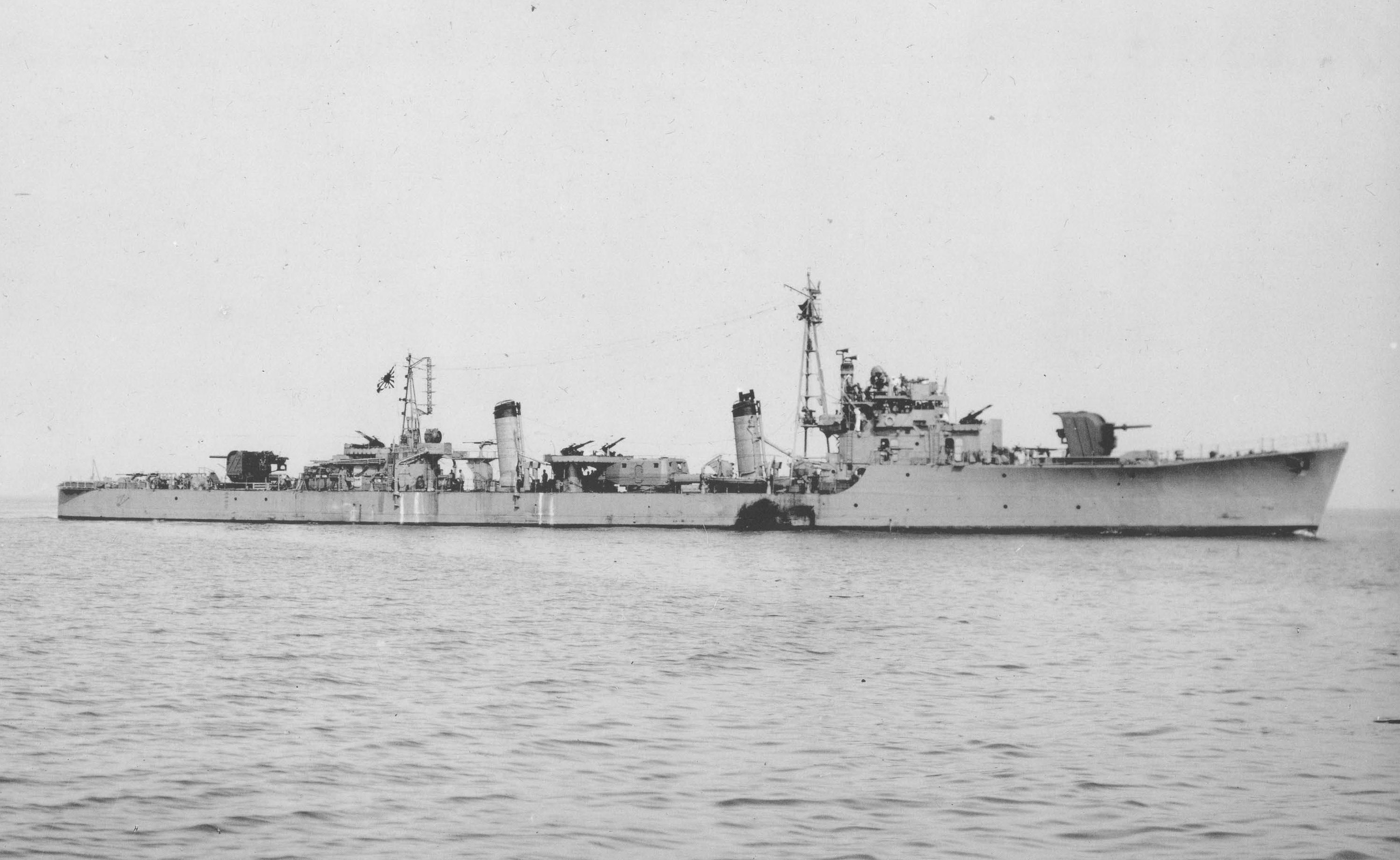
- Sister ship Momi, 4 September 1944

History

Empire of Japan
- Name: Sugi
- Namesake: Cedar
- Builder: Fujinagata Shipyards, Osaka
- Laid down: 25 February 1944
- Launched: 3 July 1944
- Completed: 25 August 1944
- Fate: Transferred to the Republic of China Navy, 31 July 1947

Republic of China
- Name: ROCS Hui Yang
- Acquired: 31 July 1947
- Stricken: 11 November 1954
- Fate: Scrapped, after 11 November 1954

General characteristics (as built)
- Class & type: Matsu-class escort destroyer
- Displacement: 1,282 t (1,262 long tons) (standard)
- Length: 100 m (328 ft 1 in) (o/a)
- Beam: 9.35 m (30 ft 8 in)
- Draft: 3.3 m (10 ft 10 in)
- Installed power: 2 × water-tube boilers; 19,000 shp (14,000 kW)
- Propulsion: 2 shafts, 2 × geared steam turbines
- Speed: 27.8 knots (51.5 km/h; 32.0 mph)
- Range: 4,680 nmi (8,670 km; 5,390 mi) at 16 knots (30 km/h; 18 mph)
- Complement: 210
- Sensors & processing systems: 1 × Type 22 search radar; 1 × Type 13 early-warning radar
- Armament: 1 × twin, 1 × single 127 mm (5 in) DP guns; 4 × triple, 13 × single 25 mm (1 in) AA guns; 1 × quadruple 610 mm (24 in) torpedo tubes; 2 × rails, 2 × throwers for 36 depth charges

Sugi (杉; "Cedar") was one of 18 Matsu-class escort destroyers built for the Imperial Japanese Navy (IJN) during World War II. Completed in mid-1944, the ship played a minor role in the Battle off Cape Engaño in October, escorting aircraft carriers and then began escorting convoys. She was damaged during the Battle of Ormoc Bay in December escorting a troop convoy in the Philippines and then escorted cruisers on a bombardment mission during Operation Rei later that month. Sugi was damaged again by American aircraft during the South China Sea raid in January 1945 and then escorted a convoy back to Japan in February where she was repaired.

Inactive for the rest of the war, she was surrendered to the Allies at the end of the war and used to repatriate Japanese troops until 1947. Mid-year the destroyer was turned over to the Republic of China and renamed Hui Yang. The ship was not placed back in commission and was cannibalized for spare parts until she was stricken in 1954 and subsequently scrapped.

== Design and description ==
Designed for ease of production, the Matsu class was smaller, slower and more lightly armed than previous destroyers as the IJN intended them for second-line duties like escorting convoys, releasing the larger ships for missions with the fleet. The ships measured 100 meters (328 ft 1 in) long overall, with a beam of 9.35 meters (30 ft 8 in) and a draft of 3.3 meters (10 ft 10 in). Their crew numbered 210 officers and enlisted men. They displaced 1,282 metric tons (1,262 long tons) at standard load and 1,554 metric tons (1,529 long tons) at deep load. The ships had two Kampon geared steam turbines, each driving one propeller shaft, using steam provided by two Kampon water-tube boilers. The turbines were rated at a total of 19,000 shaft horsepower (14,000 kW) for a speed of 27.8 knots (51.5 km/h; 32.0 mph). The Matsus had a range of 4,680 nautical miles (8,670 km; 5,390 mi) at 16 knots (30 km/h; 18 mph).

The main armament of the Matsu-class ships consisted of three 127-millimeter (5 in) Type 89 dual-purpose guns in one twin-gun mount aft and one single mount forward of the superstructure. The single mount was partially protected against spray by a gun shield. The accuracy of the Type 89 guns was severely reduced against aircraft because no high-angle gunnery director was fitted. The ships carried a total of twenty-five 25-millimeter (1 in) Type 96 anti-aircraft guns in 4 triple and 13 single mounts. The Matsus were equipped with Type 13 early-warning and Type 22 surface-search radars. The ships were also armed with a single rotating quadruple mount amidships for 610-millimeter (24 in) torpedoes. They could deliver their 36 depth charges via two stern rails and two throwers.

== Construction and career ==
Authorized in the late 1942 Modified 5th Naval Armaments Supplement Program, Sugi (cedar) was laid down by Fujinagata Shipyards on 25 February 1944 in its Osaka facility and launched on 3 July. Upon her completion on 25 August, the ship was assigned to Destroyer Squadron 11 of the Combined Fleet for training. On 25 October she participated in the Battle off Cape Engaño, escorting the aircraft carriers of the Northern Force. Sugi began convoy escort duties on 9 November when she covered a convoy from Japan to Taiwan and the Philippines and the ship was assigned to Destroyer Division 52 with four of her sisters on 15 November; five days later the division was transferred to Escort Squadron 31 of the 5th Fleet. She escorted more convoys in the Philippines and the South China Sea area afterwards and was lightly damaged by strafing American aircraft on 7 December during the Battle of Ormoc Bay; 32 crewmen were killed during the attack. Sugi was slightly damaged when aircraft from the carriers of Task Force 38 attacked Manila Harbor a week later. The following day the ship sailed for Cam Ranh Bay in occupied French Indochina to participate in Operation Rei, an attack on the American forces at San Jose on the island of Mindoro. Five destroyers, including Sugi, escorted two cruisers that departed on 24 December. They were attacked by American aircraft late the next day with most ships damaged to some extent. One destroyer was sunk by the follow-up attack by PT boats, but Sugi was undamaged during the battle.

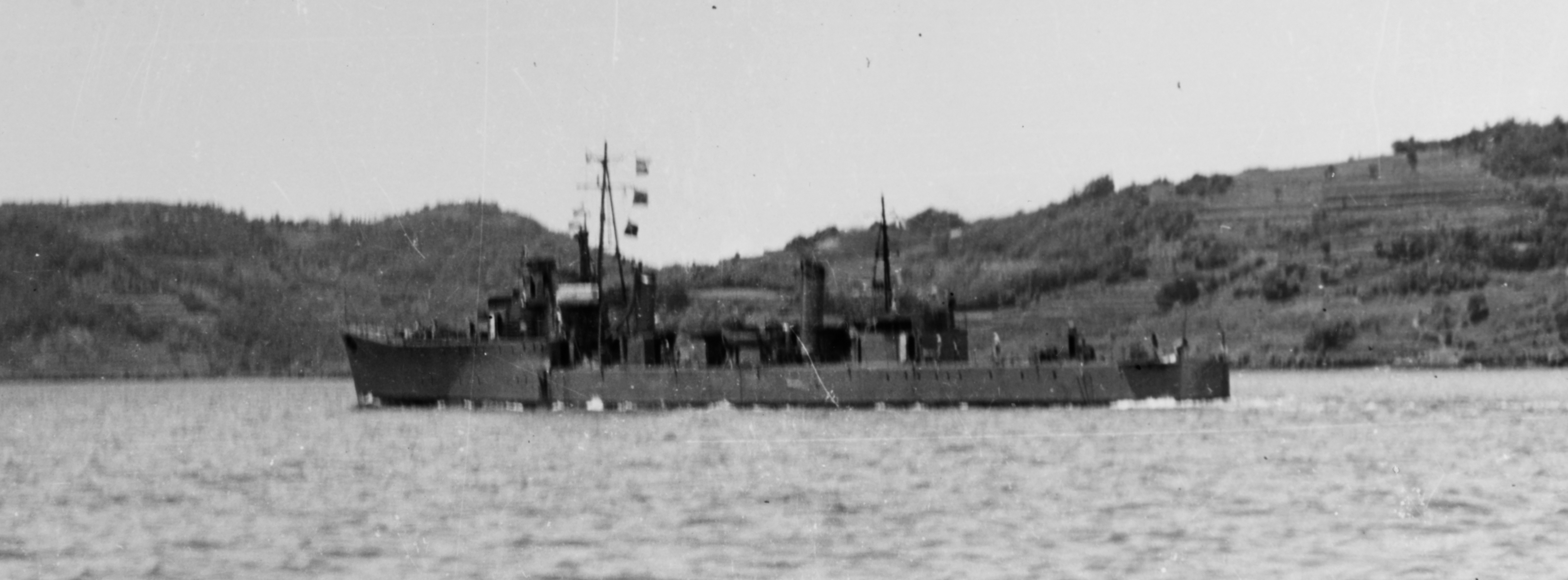
The disarmed Sugi en route from Sasebo to Shanghai to be turned over to the Chinese, July 1947

The ship was damaged by aircraft from Task Force 38 at Takao, Taiwan, on 21 January 1945 during the South China Sea raid. The following month she helped to escort a convoy from Shanghai, China, to Moji, Japan on 2–7 February and was then docked in Sasebo for repairs. Escort Squadron 31 was transferred to the Combined Fleet on 5 February. Sugi sailed to Kure on 13 March and remained in the Seto Inland Sea for the rest of the war. The squadron was reassigned to the 2nd Fleet from 15 March to 20 April and then rejoined the Combined Fleet. The ship was turned over to Allied forces at Kure at the time of the surrender of Japan on 2 September and was stricken from the navy list on 5 October.

The destroyer was disarmed and used to repatriate Japanese personnel in 1945–1947. Sugi was turned over to the Republic of China Navy on 31 July of the latter year and was renamed Hui Yang. Never rearmed or recommissioned, the ship was hulked and was stricken on 11 November 1954. Some of her components were used to refurbish her sister Xin Yang that same year before Hui Yang was scrapped.

== Bibliography ==
- Dodson, Aidan & Cant, Serena (2020). Spoils of War: The Fate of Enemy Fleets after Two World Wars. Barnsley, UK: Seaforth Publishing. ISBN 978-1-5267-4198-1.
- Jentschura, Hansgeorg; Jung, Dieter & Mickel, Peter (1977). Warships of the Imperial Japanese Navy, 1869–1945. Annapolis, Maryland: United States Naval Institute. ISBN 0-87021-893-X.
- Nevitt, Allyn D. (1998). "IJN Sugi: Tabular Record of Movement". www.combinedfleet.com.
- Rohwer, Jürgen (2005). Chronology of the War at Sea 1939–1945: The Naval History of World War Two (Third Revised ed.). Annapolis, Maryland: Naval Institute Press. ISBN 1-59114-119-2.
- Stille, Mark (2013). Imperial Japanese Navy Destroyers 1919–45 (2): Asahio to Tachibana Classes. Botley, UK: Osprey Publishing. ISBN 978-1-84908-987-6.
- Sturton, Ian (1980). "Japan". In Chesneau, Roger (ed.). Conway's All the World's Fighting Ships 1922–1946. Greenwich, UK: Conway Maritime Press. ISBN 0-85177-146-7.
- Whitley, M. J. (1988). Destroyers of World War Two: An International Encyclopedia. Annapolis, Maryland: Naval Institute Press. ISBN 0-87021-326-1.
