= Japanese destroyer Tsubaki (1944) =

Japanese Matsu-class escort destroyer

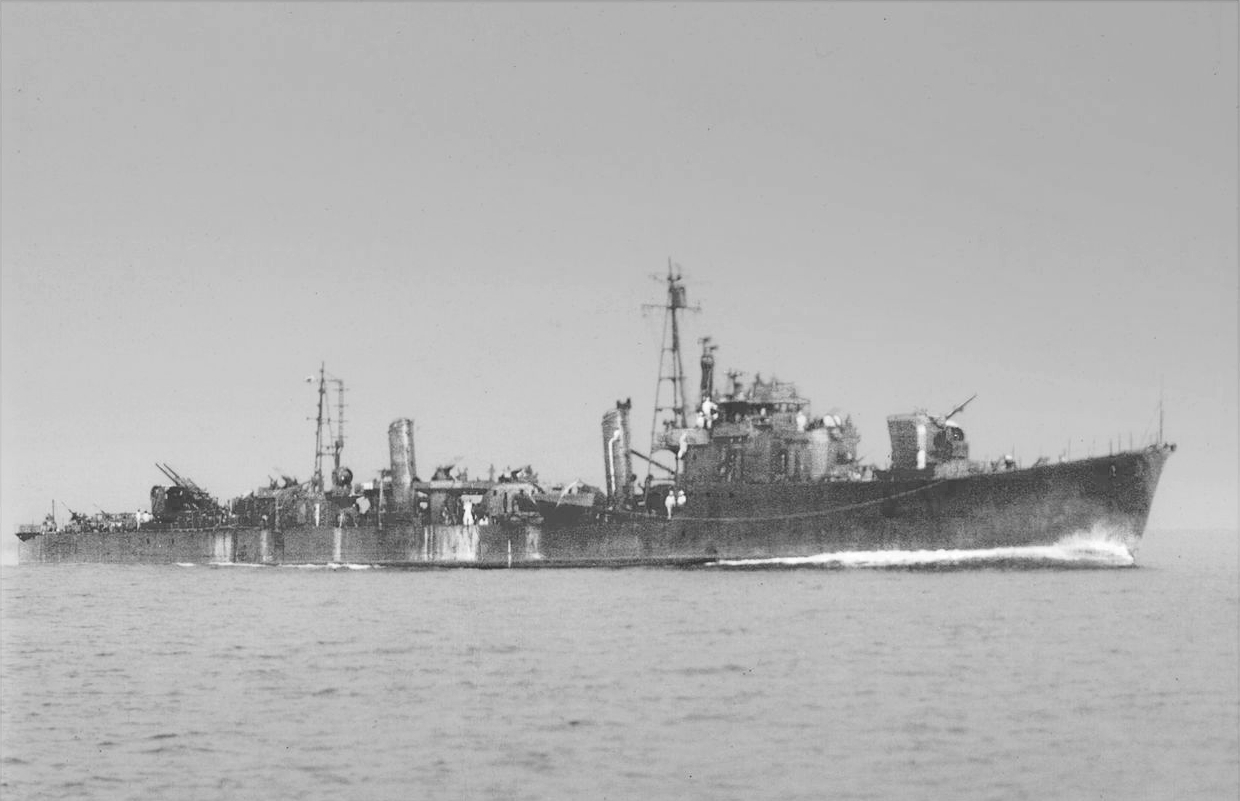
- Tsubaki, November 1944

History

Empire of Japan
- Name: Tsubaki
- Namesake: Camellia
- Builder: Maizuru Naval Arsenal
- Laid down: 20 June 1944
- Launched: 30 September 1944
- Completed: 30 November 1944
- Stricken: 30 November 1945
- Fate: Scrapped, 28 July 1948

General characteristics (as built)
- Class & type: Matsu-class escort destroyer
- Displacement: 1,282 t (1,262 long tons) (standard)
- Length: 100 m (328 ft 1 in) (o/a)
- Beam: 9.35 m (30 ft 8 in)
- Draft: 3.3 m (10 ft 10 in)
- Installed power: 2 × water-tube boilers; 19,000 shp (14,000 kW)
- Propulsion: 2 shafts, 2 × geared steam turbines
- Speed: 27.8 knots (51.5 km/h; 32.0 mph)
- Range: 4,680 nmi (8,670 km; 5,390 mi) at 16 knots (30 km/h; 18 mph)
- Complement: 210
- Sensors & processing systems: 1 × Type 22 search radar; 1 × Type 13 early-warning radar
- Armament: 1 × twin, 1 × single 127 mm (5 in) DP guns; 4 × triple, 13 × single 25 mm (1 in) AA guns; 1 × quadruple 610 mm (24 in) torpedo tubes; 2 × rails, 2 × throwers for 36 depth charges

Tsubaki (椿; "Camellia") was one of 18 Matsu-class escort destroyers built for the Imperial Japanese Navy (IJN) during World War II. Completed in late 1944, the ship began convoy escort duties in the Shanghai, China, area early the following year. After being damaged by a naval mine in April 1945, she returned home for repairs the following month. Tsubaki was damaged when American aircraft attacked targets in Japan in July and was not repaired before the end of the war several months later. The ship was scrapped in 1948.

== Design and description ==
Designed for ease of production, the Matsu class was smaller, slower and more lightly armed than previous destroyers as the IJN intended them for second-line duties like escorting convoys, releasing the larger ships for missions with the fleet. The ships measured 100 meters (328 ft 1 in) long overall, with a beam of 9.35 meters (30 ft 8 in) and a draft of 3.3 meters (10 ft 10 in). Their crew numbered 210 officers and enlisted men. They displaced 1,282 metric tons (1,262 long tons) at standard load and 1,554 metric tons (1,529 long tons) at deep load. The ships had two Kampon geared steam turbines, each driving one propeller shaft, using steam provided by two Kampon water-tube boilers. The turbines were rated at a total of 19,000 shaft horsepower (14,000 kW) for a speed of 27.8 knots (51.5 km/h; 32.0 mph). The Matsus had a range of 4,680 nautical miles (8,670 km; 5,390 mi) at 16 knots (30 km/h; 18 mph).

The main armament of the Matsu-class ships consisted of three 127-millimeter (5 in) Type 89 dual-purpose guns in one twin-gun mount aft and one single mount forward of the superstructure. The single mount was partially protected against spray by a gun shield. The accuracy of the Type 89 guns was severely reduced against aircraft because no high-angle gunnery director was fitted. The ships carried a total of 25 25-millimeter (1 in) Type 96 anti-aircraft guns in 4 triple and 13 single mounts. The Matsus were equipped with Type 13 early-warning and Type 22 surface-search radars. The ships were also armed with a single rotating quadruple mount amidships for 610-millimeter (24 in) torpedoes. They could deliver their 36 depth charges via two stern rails and two throwers.

== Construction and career ==
Authorized in the late 1942 Modified 5th Naval Armaments Supplement Program, Tsubaki (Camellia) was laid down on 20 June 1944 at the Maizuru Naval Arsenal and launched on 30 September. Upon her completion on 30 November, the ship was assigned to Destroyer Squadron 11 of the Combined Fleet for training. She escorted a convoy from Moji, Japan, to Shanghai on 15 February 1945 and then remained in the Shanghai area escorting convoys and patrolling. On 15 March the ship was reassigned to the squadron's Destroyer Division 53. The squadron was briefly attached to the Second Fleet from 1–20 April before rejoining the Combined Fleet. During this time, Tsubaki was moderately damaged when she struck a naval mine in the Yangtze River on 10 April that had been laid by American Boeing B-29 Superfortress bombers.

The ship escorted a convoy to Japan on 30 May when she returned for permanent repairs to Moji. Following their completion she remained in the Seto Inland Sea. Destroyer Division 53 was deactivated on 15 July and Tsubaki was moderately damaged by American carrier aircraft from Task Force 38 near Okayama when they attacked targets around the Inland Sea on 24 July. The ship had to be towed to Kure for repairs although they were not completed before the end of the war in August. She was turned over to Allied forces there at the time of the surrender of Japan on 2 September and was stricken from the navy list on 30 November. Tsubaki was broken up at Kure beginning on 28 July 1948.

== Bibliography ==
- Jentschura, Hansgeorg; Jung, Dieter & Mickel, Peter (1977). Warships of the Imperial Japanese Navy, 1869–1945. Annapolis, Maryland: United States Naval Institute. ISBN 0-87021-893-X.
- Nevitt, Allyn D. (7 January 2012). "IJN Tsubaki: Tabular Record of Movement". www.combinedfleet.com.
- Rohwer, Jürgen (2005). Chronology of the War at Sea 1939–1945: The Naval History of World War Two (Third Revised ed.). Annapolis, Maryland: Naval Institute Press. ISBN 1-59114-119-2.
- Stille, Mark (2013). Imperial Japanese Navy Destroyers 1919–45 (2): Asahio to Tachibana Classes. Botley, UK: Osprey Publishing. ISBN 978-1-84908-987-6.
- Sturton, Ian (1980). "Japan". In Chesneau, Roger (ed.). Conway's All the World's Fighting Ships 1922–1946. Greenwich, UK: Conway Maritime Press. ISBN 0-85177-146-7.
- Whitley, M. J. (1988). Destroyers of World War Two: An International Encyclopedia. Annapolis, Maryland: Naval Institute Press. ISBN 0-87021-326-1.
