= Japanese destroyer Kashi (1944) =

Destroyer of the Imperial Japanese Navy

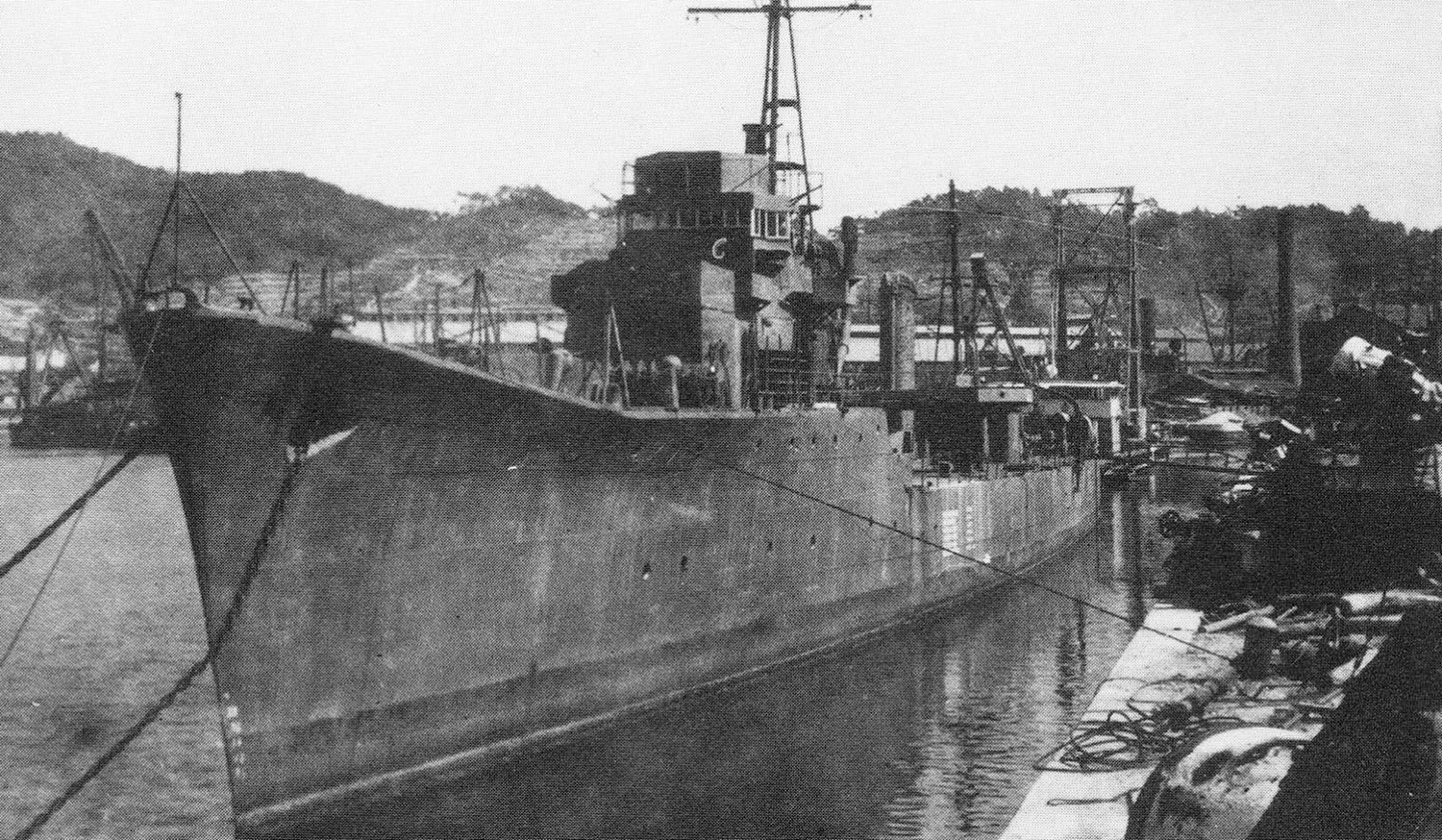
- Disarmed Kashi after the surrender of Japan

History

Empire of Japan
- Name: Kashi
- Namesake: Live oak
- Builder: Fujinagata Shipyards, Osaka
- Laid down: 5 May 1944
- Launched: 13 August 1944
- Completed: 30 September 1944

General characteristics (as built)
- Class & type: Matsu-class escort destroyer
- Displacement: 1,282 t (1,262 long tons) (standard)
- Length: 100 m (328 ft 1 in) (o/a)
- Beam: 9.35 m (30 ft 8 in)
- Draft: 3.3 m (10 ft 10 in)
- Installed power: 2 × water-tube boilers; 19,000 shp (14,000 kW)
- Propulsion: 2 shafts, 2 × geared steam turbines
- Speed: 27.8 knots (51.5 km/h; 32.0 mph)
- Range: 4,680 nmi (8,670 km; 5,390 mi) at 16 knots (30 km/h; 18 mph)
- Complement: 210
- Sensors & processing systems: 1 × Type 22 search radar; 1 × Type 13 early-warning radar
- Armament: 1 × twin, 1 × single 127 mm (5 in) DP guns; 4 × triple, 13 × single 25 mm (1 in) AA guns; 1 × quadruple 610 mm (24 in) torpedo tubes; 2 × rails, 2 × throwers for 36 depth charges

Kashi (樫; "Live oak") was one of 18 Matsu-class escort destroyers built for the Imperial Japanese Navy (IJN) during World War II. Completed in late 1944, the ship began convoy escort duties in October. She escorted cruisers on a bombardment mission in the Philippines during Operation Rei in December. Kashi was damaged by an American airstrike in Taiwan in early 1945 and returned to Japan for repairs. She spent the rest of the war escorting convoys in Japanese waters and was slightly damaged during the American attacks on Kure and the Inland Sea in July. She was used to repatriate Japanese personnel after the war until 1947. Mid-year the destroyer was turned over to the United States and subsequently scrapped.

== Design and description ==
Designed for ease of production, the Matsu class was smaller, slower and more lightly armed than previous destroyers as the IJN intended them for second-line duties like escorting convoys, releasing the larger ships for missions with the fleet. The ships measured 100 meters (328 ft 1 in) long overall, with a beam of 9.35 meters (30 ft 8 in) and a draft of 3.3 meters (10 ft 10 in). Their crew numbered 210 officers and enlisted men. They displaced 1,282 metric tons (1,262 long tons) at standard load and 1,554 metric tons (1,529 long tons) at deep load. The ships had two Kampon geared steam turbines, each driving one propeller shaft using steam provided by two Kampon water-tube boilers. The turbines were rated at a total of 19,000 shaft horsepower (14,000 kW) for a speed of 27.8 knots (51.5 km/h; 32.0 mph). The Matsus had a range of 4,680 nautical miles (8,670 km; 5,390 mi) at 16 knots (30 km/h; 18 mph).

The main armament of the Matsu-class ships consisted of three 127-millimeter (5 in) Type 89 dual-purpose guns in one twin-gun mount aft and one single mount forward of the superstructure. The single mount was partially protected against spray by a gun shield. The accuracy of the Type 89 guns was severely reduced against aircraft because no high-angle gunnery director was fitted. The ships carried a total of twenty-five 25-millimeter (1 in) Type 96 anti-aircraft guns in 4 triple and 13 single mounts. The Matsus were equipped with Type 13 early-warning and Type 22 surface-search radars. The ships were also armed with a single rotating quadruple mount amidships for 610-millimeter (24 in) torpedoes. They could deliver their 36 depth charges via two stern rails and two throwers.

== Construction and career ==
Authorized in the late 1942 Modified 5th Naval Armaments Supplement Program, Kashi was laid down on 5 May 1944 by Fujinagata Shipyards at their Osaka facility and launched on 13 August. Upon her completion on 30 September, the ship was assigned to Destroyer Squadron 11 of the Combined Fleet for training. Kashi escorted a convoy to Singapore during 14 November–4 December. She was assigned to Destroyer Division 52, Destroyer Squadron 11 of the Combined Fleet a day after the escort mission began. The division was transferred to Escort Squadron 31 of the 5th Fleet on the 20th. Kashi steamed from Manila, the Philippines, to Cam Ranh Bay in occupied French Indochina on 15–16 December to participate in Operation Rei, an attack on the American forces at San Jose on the island of Mindoro. Five destroyers, including Kashi, escorted two cruisers that departed on 24 December. They were attacked by American aircraft late the next day; the ship was not a target during the attack and the Japanese ships returned to Cam Ranh Bay.

Kashi arrived in Takao, Taiwan, on 7 January 1945 and was moderately damaged by American aircraft on 21 January. The ship was able to reach Hong Kong two days later and then escorted a convoy from Shanghai to Moji on 2–7 February. She continued onwards to Sasebo, Japan, where she was docked for permanent repairs. On 5 February Escort Squadron 31 was transferred to the Combined Fleet. The ship arrived at Kure on 14 March and remained in the Seto Inland Sea for the rest of the war. The squadron was reassigned to the Second Fleet from 15 March to 20 April and then rejoined the Combined Fleet. Kashi was lightly damaged during the attacks on Kure and the Inland Sea in July. She was turned over to Allied forces at Kure at the time of the surrender of Japan on 2 September and was stricken from the navy list on 5 October. The destroyer was disarmed and used to repatriate Japanese personnel, operated by Japanese personnel under Allied control. After the conclusion of the repatriation mission in 1947, the ship was turned over to the United States on 7 August and scrapped by Kasado KB in Kobe, Japan, on 20 March 1948.

== Bibliography ==
- Dodson, Aidan & Cant, Serena (2020). Spoils of War: The Fate of Enemy Fleets after Two World Wars. Barnsley, UK: Seaforth Publishing. ISBN 978-1-5267-4198-1.
- Jentschura, Hansgeorg; Jung, Dieter & Mickel, Peter (1977). Warships of the Imperial Japanese Navy, 1869–1945. Annapolis, Maryland: United States Naval Institute. ISBN 0-87021-893-X.
- Nevitt, Allyn D. (1998). "IJN Kashi: Tabular Record of Movement". www.combinedfleet.com.
- Rohwer, Jürgen (2005). Chronology of the War at Sea 1939–1945: The Naval History of World War Two (Third Revised ed.). Annapolis, Maryland: Naval Institute Press. ISBN 1-59114-119-2.
- Stille, Mark (2013). Imperial Japanese Navy Destroyers 1919–45 (2): Asahio to Tachibana Classes. Botley, UK: Osprey Publishing. ISBN 978-1-84908-987-6.
- Sturton, Ian (1980). "Japan". In Chesneau, Roger (ed.). Conway's All the World's Fighting Ships 1922–1946. Greenwich, UK: Conway Maritime Press. ISBN 0-85177-146-7.
- Whitley, M. J. (1988). Destroyers of World War Two: An International Encyclopedia. Annapolis, Maryland: Naval Institute Press. ISBN 0-87021-326-1.
