= Japanese destroyer Nara (1944) =

Japanese Matsu-class escort destroyers

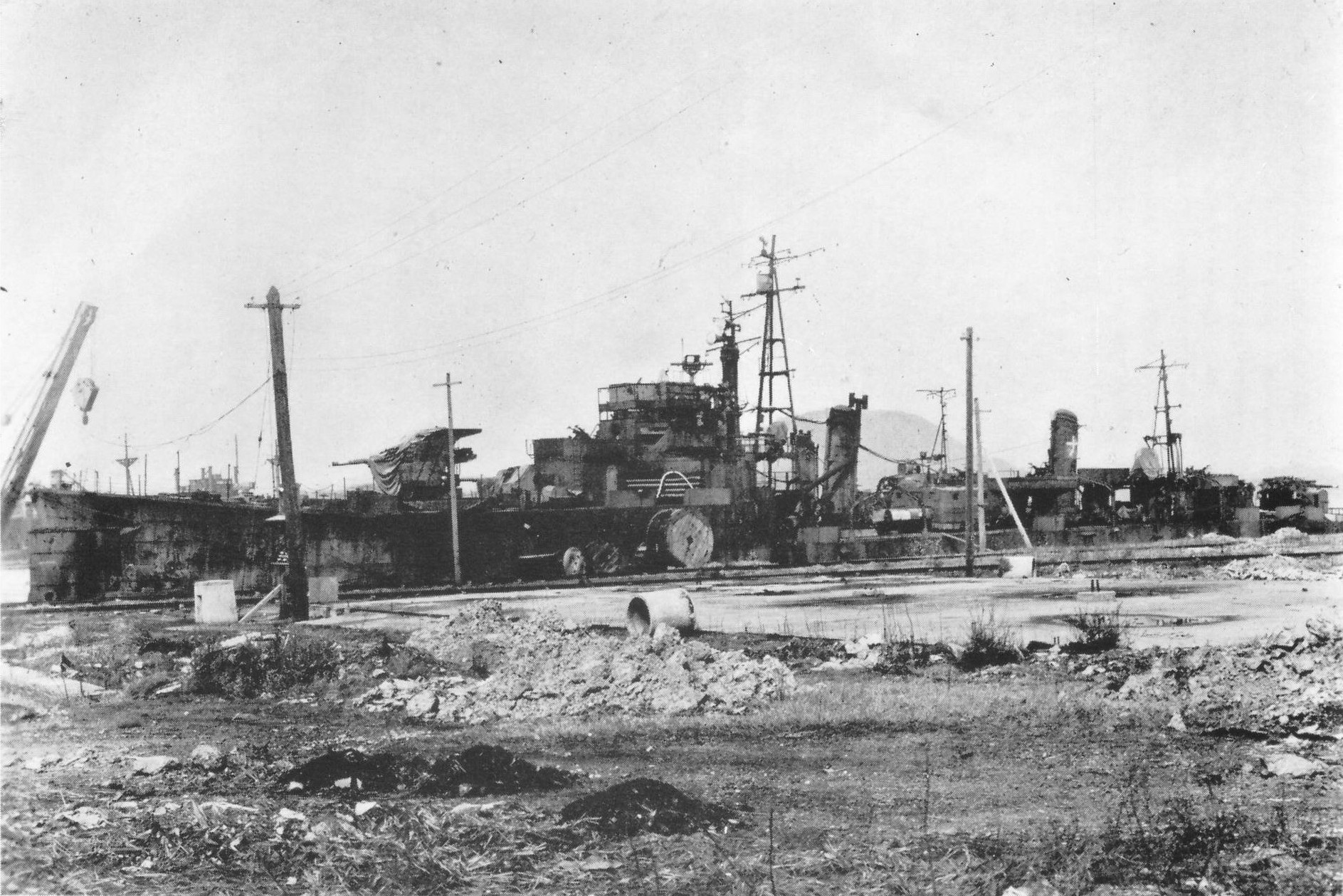
- Nara in Moji, 1947

History

Empire of Japan
- Name: Nara
- Namesake: Oak
- Builder: Fujinagata Shipyards, Osaka
- Laid down: 10 June 1944
- Launched: 12 October 1944
- Completed: 26 November 1944
- Stricken: 30 November 1945
- Fate: Scrapped, July 1948

General characteristics (as built)
- Class & type: Matsu-class destroyer
- Displacement: 1,282 t (1,262 long tons) (standard)
- Length: 100 m (328 ft 1 in) (o/a)
- Beam: 9.35 m (30 ft 8 in)
- Draft: 3.3 m (10 ft 10 in)
- Installed power: 2 × water-tube boilers; 19,000 shp (14,000 kW)
- Propulsion: 2 shafts, 2 × geared steam turbines
- Speed: 27.8 knots (51.5 km/h; 32.0 mph)
- Range: 4,680 nmi (8,670 km; 5,390 mi) at 16 knots (30 km/h; 18 mph)
- Complement: 210
- Sensors & processing systems: 1 × Type 22 search radar; 1 × Type 13 early-warning radar
- Armament: 1 × twin, 1 × single 127 mm (5 in) DP guns; 4 × triple, 13 × single 25 mm (1 in) AA guns; 1 × quadruple 610 mm (24 in) torpedo tubes; 2 × rails, 2 × throwers for 36 depth charges

Nara (楢; "Oak") was one of 18 Matsu-class destroyers built for the Imperial Japanese Navy (IJN) during World War II. Completed in November 1944, the ship was badly damaged when she struck a naval mine in June 1945. She was not repaired before the end of the war and was scrapped in 1948.

== Design and description ==
Designed for ease of production, the Matsu class was smaller, slower, and more lightly armed than previous destroyers, as the IJN intended them for second-line duties like escorting convoys, releasing the larger ships for missions with the fleet. The ships measured 100 meters (328 ft 1 in) long overall, with a beam of 9.35 meters (30 ft 8 in) and a draft of 3.3 meters (10 ft 10 in). Their crew numbered 210 officers and enlisted men. They displaced 1,282 metric tons (1,262 long tons) at standard load and 1,554 metric tons (1,529 long tons) at deep load. The ships had two Kampon geared steam turbines, each driving one propeller shaft, using steam provided by two Kampon water-tube boilers. The turbines were rated at a total of 19,000 shaft horsepower (14,000 kW) for a speed of 27.8 knots (51.5 km/h; 32.0 mph). The Matsus had a range of 4,680 nautical miles (8,670 km; 5,390 mi) at 16 knots (30 km/h; 18 mph).

The main armament of the Matsu-class ships consisted of three 127-millimeter (5 in) Type 89 dual-purpose guns in one twin-gun mount aft and one single mount forward of the superstructure. The single mount was partially protected against spray by a gun shield. The accuracy of the Type 89 guns was severely reduced against aircraft because no high-angle gunnery director was fitted. The ships carried a total of twenty-five 25-millimeter (1 in) Type 96 anti-aircraft guns in 4 triple and 13 single mounts. The Matsus were equipped with Type 13 early-warning and Type 22 surface-search radars. The ships were also armed with a single rotating quadruple mount amidships for 610-millimeter (24 in) torpedoes. They could deliver their 36 depth charges via two stern rails and two throwers.

== Construction and career ==
Authorized in the late 1942 by the Modified 5th Naval Armaments Supplement Program, Nara was laid down by Fujinagata Shipyards on 10 June 1944 in its Osaka facility and launched on 12 October. Upon her completion on 26 November, the ship was assigned to Destroyer Squadron 11 of the Combined Fleet for training. The ship was assigned to the squadron's Destroyer Division 53 on 15 March. The squadron was briefly attached to the Second Fleet on 1–20 April before rejoining the Combined Fleet. She was badly damaged when she struck a mine near the Shimonoseki Strait on 30 June. The division was disbanded on 15 July; Nara was disarmed and towed to Moji. The ship was turned over to Allied forces there at the time of the surrender of Japan on 2 September and was stricken from the navy list on 30 November. Unrepaired, she was broken up at Shimonoseki in July 1948.

== Bibliography ==
- Jentschura, Hansgeorg; Jung, Dieter & Mickel, Peter (1977). Warships of the Imperial Japanese Navy, 1869–1945. Annapolis, Maryland: United States Naval Institute. ISBN 0-87021-893-X.
- Nevitt, Allyn D. (1998). "IJN Nara: Tabular Record of Movement". www.combinedfleet.com.
- Rohwer, Jürgen (2005). Chronology of the War at Sea 1939–1945: The Naval History of World War Two (Third Revised ed.). Annapolis, Maryland: Naval Institute Press. ISBN 1-59114-119-2.
- Stille, Mark (2013). Imperial Japanese Navy Destroyers 1919–45 (2): Asahio to Tachibana Classes. Botley, UK: Osprey Publishing. ISBN 978-1-84908-987-6.
- Sturton, Ian (1980). "Japan". In Chesneau, Roger (ed.). Conway's All the World's Fighting Ships 1922–1946. Greenwich, UK: Conway Maritime Press. ISBN 0-85177-146-7.
- Whitley, M. J. (1988). Destroyers of World War Two: An International Encyclopedia. Annapolis, Maryland: Naval Institute Press. ISBN 0-87021-326-1.
