= Fujinagata Shipyards =

Japanese shibuilder

Fujinagata Shipyards (藤永田造船所, Fujinagata Zōsenjo) was a shipyard and railroad car manufacturer in Osaka, Japan.

== History ==
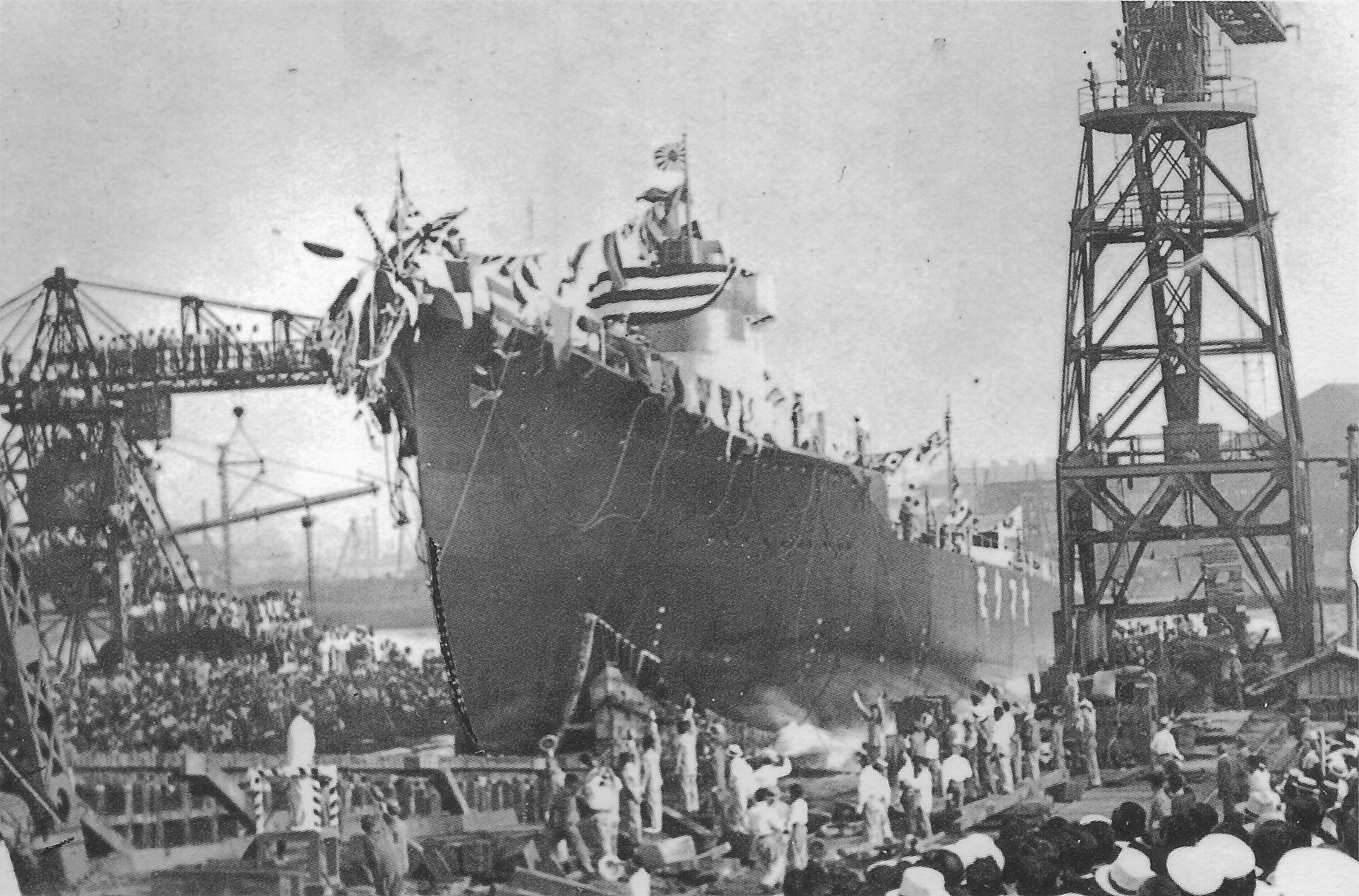
Ceremonial ship launch of Japanese destroyer Yamagumo at Fujinagata Shipyards on July 24, 1937

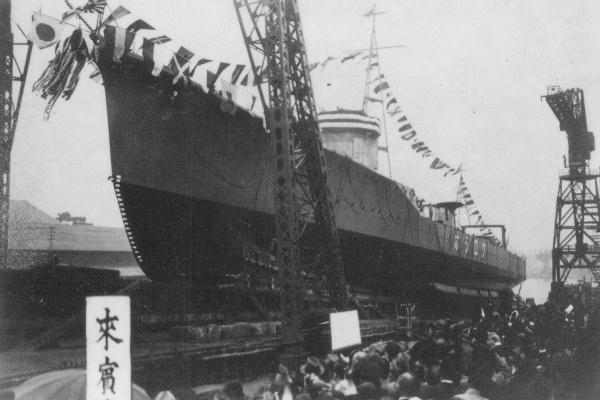
The destroyer Kuroshio launching from Fujinagata Shipyards, 1938

Fujinagata claimed to have been founded in 1689, making it one of the oldest shipbuilders in Japan. Originally called Hyōgo-ya, and located in central Osaka, it was contracted in 1854 by officials representing the Tokugawa shogunate to produce sail warships for the new Tokugawa feudal navy. In 1869, with the assistance of German engineers, the western-style warships were designed and produced.

After the Meiji Restoration, the shipyards concentrated on civilian applications, and in 1870 launched its first western-style commercial steam vessel. This was a first for a privately held shipbuilder in Japan.

In 1874, the shipyards were relocated to Nishi-ku, Osaka and the company name officially changed to Fujinagata Shipyards. In 1884, the main shipyards were relocated to Taisho-ku, Osaka.

In 1900, Fujinagata completed its first all-metal construction merchant vessel; the No.2 Nagata Maru. In 1917, new shipyards in Sumiyoshi-ku, Osaka were opened. Fujinagata was designated an official naval repair facility in 1919.

On May 31, 1921, the Momi class destroyer Fuji was launched, marking the first of 56 destroyers that Fujinagata would eventually build for the Imperial Japanese Navy.

With new naval contracts, Fujinagata moved its head office into new facilities and expanded its capability rapidly. However, it expanded too quickly and soon fell into financial difficulties causing its shipbuilding business to come under the accounting supervision of the Ministry of the Navy of Japan in December 1928. However, Fujinagata was able to weather the turmoil of the Great Depression without significant difficulty.

In 1940, along with most businesses of strategic importance to the Japanese war effort, Fujinagata was nationalized under the Navy Ministry. In December 1944, Fujinagata had 16,508 employees. It is estimated that perhaps half of the employees at that time were ethnic Koreans, and at least 150 were Australian prisoners of war, who were supplying forced labor in violation of the Geneva Conventions.

In June 1945, Fujinagata's main shipyards were destroyed during large-scale air raids towards the end of World War II.

After World War II, Fujinagata was restored to private ownership and recovered by building fishing vessels, merchant vessels and tankers. In 1962, it completed its first LNG carrier. In October 1967, the company was purchased by Mitsui Shipbuilding and Engineering, thus ending its long history as the oldest independent shipbuilder in Japan.

== List of ships ==
...

- 1 of 9 Kamikaze-class
  - Asanagi (completed 29 December 1925)
- 3 of 12 Mutsuki-class
  - Satsuki (completed 15 November 1925)
  - Fumizuki (3 July 1926)
  - Yūzuki (25 July 1927)
- 4 of 24 Fubuki-class
  - Murakumo (completed 10 May 1929)
  - Shirakumo (28 July 1928)
  - Ayanami (30 April 1930)
  - Inazuma (15 November 1930)
- 0 of 6 Hatsuharu-class
- 2 of 10 Shiratsuyu-class
  - Murasame (7 January 1937)
  - Kawakaze (30 April 1937)
- 2 of 10 Asashio-class
  - Michishio (completed 31 October 1937)
  - Yamagumo (15 January 1938)
  - Minegumo (30 April 1938)
- 5 of 19 Kagero-class
  - Kuroshio (completed 27 January 1940)
  - Natsushio (31 August 1940)
  - Urakaze (15 December 1940)
  - Tanikaze (25 April 1941)
  - Maikaze (15 July 1941)
- 7 of 19 Yugumo-class
  - Makigumo (completed 8 August 1942)
  - Naganami (30 June 1942)
  - Ōnami (29 December 1942)
  - Tamanami (30 April 1943)
  - Fujinami (31 July 1943)
  - Asashimo (27 November 1943)
  - Akishimo (11 March 1944)
- 6 of 18 Matsu-class
  - Ume (completed 28 June 1944)
  - Kuwa (15 July 1944)
  - Sugi (25 August 1944)
  - Kashi (30 September 1944)
  - Nara (26 November 1944)
  - Yanagi (8 January 1944)
- 1 of 14 Tachibana-class
  - Kaba (29 May 1945)
