= Japanese destroyer Fuji =

Destroyer in the Imperial Japanese Navy

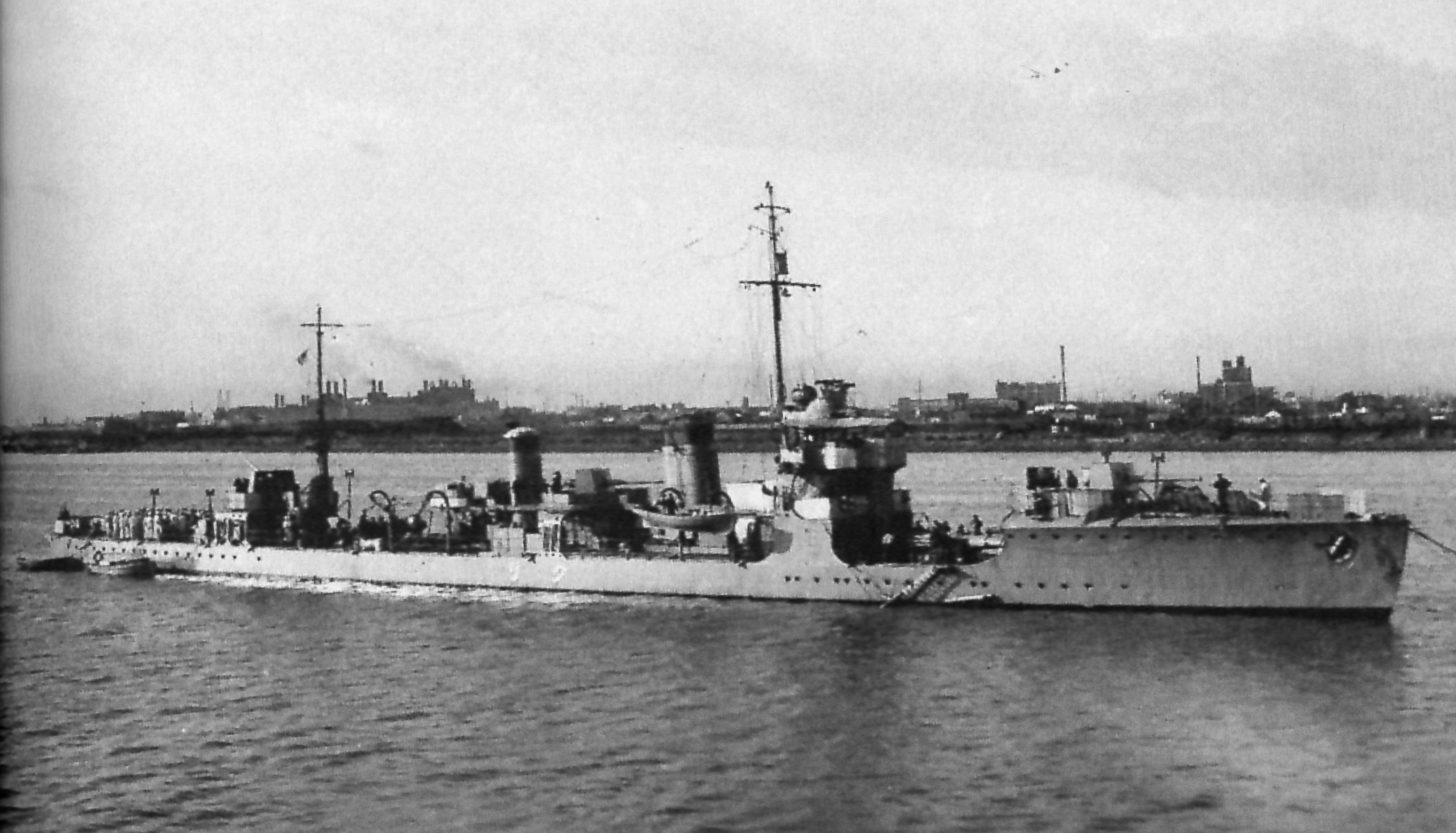
- Sister ship Kuri at anchor, 1937

History

Empire of Japan
- Name: Fuji
- Builder: Fujinagata Shipyards, Osaka, Japan
- Laid down: 6 December 1919
- Launched: 27 November 1920
- Completed: 31 May 1921
- Renamed: As Patrol Boat No. 36, 1 April 1940
- Reclassified: As patrol boat, 1 April 1940
- Stricken: 10 August 1946
- Fate: Surrendered to Netherlands in June 1946 at Surabaya; scrapped 1947.

General characteristics (as built)
- Type: Momi-class destroyer
- Displacement: 850 long tons (864 t) (normal); 1,020 long tons (1,036 t) (deep load)
- Length: 275 ft (83.8 m) (pp); 280 ft (85.3 m) (o/a)
- Beam: 26 ft (7.9 m)
- Draft: 8 ft (2.4 m)
- Installed power: 3 × Kampon water-tube boilers; 21,500 shp (16,000 kW)
- Propulsion: 2 shafts; 2 × geared steam turbines
- Speed: 36 knots (67 km/h; 41 mph)
- Range: 3,000 nmi (5,600 km; 3,500 mi) at 15 knots (28 km/h; 17 mph)
- Complement: 110
- Armament: 3 × single 12 cm (4.7 in) guns; 2 × twin 533 mm (21 in) torpedo tubes

The Japanese destroyer Fuji (藤, Wisteria) was one of 21 Momi-class destroyers built for the Imperial Japanese Navy (IJN) in the late 1910s and was converted into a patrol boat in 1940. After the end of Second World War, she was briefly operated by Indonesia before surrendered to the Netherlands in June 1946 at Surabaya; she was finally scrapped in 1947.

== Design and description ==
The Momi class was designed with higher speed and better seakeeping than the preceding Enoki-class second-class destroyers. The ships had an overall length of 280 feet (85.3 m) and were 275 feet (83.8 m) between perpendiculars. They had a beam of 26 feet (7.9 m), and a mean draft of 8 feet (2.4 m). The Momi-class ships displaced 850 long tons (864 t) at standard load and 1,020 long tons (1,036 t) at deep load. Fuji was powered by two Parsons geared steam turbines, each driving one propeller shaft using steam provided by three Kampon water-tube boilers. The turbines were designed to produce 21,500 shaft horsepower (16,000 kW) to give the ships a speed of 36 knots (67 km/h; 41 mph). The ships carried a maximum of 275 long tons (279 t) of fuel oil which gave them a range of 3,000 nautical miles (5,600 km; 3,500 mi) at 15 knots (28 km/h; 17 mph). Their crew consisted of 110 officers and crewmen.

The main armament of the Momi-class ships consisted of three 12-centimeter (4.7 in) Type 3 guns in single mounts; one gun forward of the well deck, one between the two funnels, and the last gun atop the aft superstructure. The guns were numbered '1' to '3' from front to rear. The ships carried two above-water twin sets of 533-millimeter (21 in) torpedo tubes; one mount was in the well deck between the forward superstructure and the bow gun and the other between the aft funnel and aft superstructure.

In 1940, Fuji was converted into a patrol boat. Her torpedo tubes, minesweeping gear, and aft 12 cm gun were removed in exchange for two triple mounts for license-built 25 mm (1 in) Type 96 light AA guns and 60 depth charges. In addition one boiler was removed, which reduced her speed to 18 knots (33 km/h; 21 mph) from 12,000 shp (8,900 kW). These changes made her top heavy and ballast had to be added which increased her displacement to 950 metric tons (935 long tons).

== Construction and career ==
Fuji, built at the Fujinagata Shipyards in Osaka, was laid down on 6 December 1919, launched on 27 November 1920, and completed on 31 May 1921. During 1940, she was converted into a patrol boat and was renamed Patrol Boat No. 36 on 1 April.

After the end of Second World War, she carried out repatriation duty in the Dutch East Indies area. The ship was seized by Indonesian People's Security Army Naval Force off Tegal on 7/8 June 1946 and, under the Indonesian flag, sailed for Jepara. Royal Netherlands Navy found her off Jepara and she was captured by a boarding party from HNLMS Van Kinsbergen. The ship arrived in Surabaya on 9 June and was stricken from the Navy List on 10 August. Patrol Boat No. 36 was ceded to the Netherlands and scrapped in 1947.
