= Modified 5th Naval Armaments Supplement Programme =

Japanese armaments expansion plan

The Modified 5th Naval Armaments Supplement Programme (戦備促進第二次実行計画, Senbi-Sokushin Dai-Ni-Ji Jikkō Keikaku), Modified Circle 5 Plan (改マル5計画, Kai Maru 5 Keikaku), was one of the wartime armaments expansion plans of the Imperial Japanese Navy (IJN).

== Background ==
In September 1942, after being defeated in the Battle of Midway, the IJN drew up a new armaments expansion plan. This plan was combined by the 5th Naval Armaments Supplement Programme and the 6th Naval Armaments Supplement Programme to build the aircraft carriers rapidly. The main article was to build 20 aircraft carriers, and removed all battleships and heavy cruisers. Because of the need to protect convoys against Allied submarines some 72 destroyers were added to the programme and due to recent successes by Japanese submarines against Allied carriers some 96 large submarines were included.

They had approved 412 vessels, 1,150,000 tons. However, most of plans were not achieved. Until the end of the war only 60 vessels from this plan were completed.

== Table of vessels ==
Category	Class	Vessel number(s)	Completed	Converted	Cancelled
Aircraft carrier	Unryū	#5001–5015	Amagi (#5001), Katsuragi (#5003)	#5002 and #5005 were converted to the Shinano	#5008–5015
Aircraft carrier	G15 (Modified Taiho)	#5021–5025			#5021–5025
Seaplane tender	Akitsushima	#5031–5033			#5031–5033
Submarine tender	J27	#5034–5036			#5034–5036
Light cruiser	C44	#5037–5038			#5037–5038
Minelayer	H12C	#5039			#5039
Destroyer Type-A	Yūgumo	#5041–5048			#5041–5048
Destroyer Type-B	Akizuki	#5061–5083			#5061–5083
Cruiser submarine Type-A	I-13	#5091–5093	I-14 (#5091)		
Cruiser submarine Type-A	S48	#5094–5096			#5094–5096
Cruiser submarine Type-B	I-54	#5101–5114			#5101–5114
Cruiser submarine Type-B	S49A	#5115–5132			#5115–5132
Cruiser submarine Type-C	I-52	#5141–5155			#5141–5155
Cruiser submarine Type-C	S49B	#5156–5180			#5156–5180
Medium-sized submarine	Ro-35	#5181–5223			#5181–5223
Submarine Special type	I-400	#5231–5248	I-400 (#5231), I-401 (#5232), I-402 (#5233)		#5234–5248
Escort ship Type-B	Ukuru	#5251–5284	Yaku (#5251), Chikubu (#5253), Kōzu (#5255), Hodaka (#5256), Ikara (#5258), Ikuno (#5260)	#5252, 5254, 5257, 5259 and 5263–5266 were converted to the Hiburi class	#5261–#5262, 5267–5284
Escort ship Type-B	Hiburi		Kume (#5252), Ikuna (#5254), Shisaka (#5257), Sakito (#5259), Mokuto (#5263), Habuto (#5264)		#5265–5266
Minesweeper	No.19	#5301–5336			#5301–5336
Subchaser	No.13	#5341–5370	No.60 (#5341), No.61 (#5342), No.63 (#5344)		#5343, 5345–5370
Fleet oiler	Kazahaya	#5381–5387			#5381–5387
Fleet oiler	J34	#5388–5395			#5388–5395
Food supply ship	Kinesaki	#5401–5407			#5401–5407
Food supply ship	J20C	#5408			#5408
Food supply ship	J35	#5409–5410			#5409–5410
Target ship	Ōhama	#5411–5415	Ōhama (#5411)		#5412–5415
Repair ship	Akashi	#5416–5417			#5416–5417
Survey ship	J11C	#5418			#5418
Icebreaker	J23	#5419			#5419
Minelayer	Ajiro	#5421–5432			#5421–5432
Submarine Type-D	I-361	#5461–5471	I-361 (#5461), I-362 (#5462), I-363 (#5463), I-364 (#5464), I-365 (#5465), I-366 (#5466), I-367 (#5467), I-368 (#5468), I-369 (#5469), I-370 (#5470), I-371 (#5471)		
Destroyer Type-D	Matsu	#5481–5522	Matsu (#5481), Take (#5482), Ume (#5483), Momo (#5484), Kuwa (#5485), Kiri (#5486), Sugi (#5487), Maki (#5488), Momi (#5489), Kashi (#5490), Kaya (#5492), Nara (#5493), Sakura (#5496), Yanagi (#5497), Tsubaki (#5498), Kaki (#5499), Kaba (#5500), Hinoki (#5502), Kaede (#5505), Keyaki (#5508), Tachibana (#5511), Tsuta (#5514), Hagi (#5517), Sumire (#5520), Kusunoki (#5521), Hatsuzakura (#5522)		#5491, 5494–5495, 5501, 5503–5504, 5506–5507, 5509–5510, 5512–5513, 5515–5516, 5518–5519

== See also ==
- 1st Naval Armaments Supplement Programme (Maru 1 Keikaku, 1931)
- 2nd Naval Armaments Supplement Programme (Maru 2 Keikaku, 1934)
- 3rd Naval Armaments Supplement Programme (Maru 3 Keikaku, 1937)
- 4th Naval Armaments Supplement Programme (Maru 4 Keikaku, 1939)
- Temporal Naval Armaments Supplement Programme (Maru Rin Keikaku, 1940)
- Rapidly Naval Armaments Supplement Programme (Maru Kyū Keikaku, 1941)
- Additional Naval Armaments Supplement Programme (Maru Tui Keikaku, 1941)
- 5th Naval Armaments Supplement Programme (Maru 5 Keikaku, 1941)
- 6th Naval Armaments Supplement Programme (Maru 6 Keikaku, 1942)
- Wartime Naval Armaments Supplement Programme (Maru Sen Keikaku, 1944)
