= List of Japanese World War II radars =

A list of Japanese radars used during World War II.

== Army radar ==
Radar used by the Imperial Japanese Army.

=== Ground-based radar ===
- Ta-Chi 1 Ground-Based Target Tracking Radar Model 1 - SCR-268 1.5 meter band (200 MHz) derivative built in small numbers
- Ta-Chi 2 Ground-Based Target Tracking Radar Model 2 - SCR-268 1.5 meter band (200 MHz) derivative built in small numbers
- Ta-Chi 3 Ground-Based Target Tracking Radar Model 3 - (Based on British GL sets captured in Singapore) - 3.75 m (80 MHz) pw = 1 or 2 us, Power = 50 kW, PRF = 1 or 2 kHz (range 40 km), 150 built by Sumitomo Entered service early 1944. Yagi Antenna
- Ta-Chi 4 Ground-Based Target Tracking Radar Model 4 - SCR-268 1.5 meter band (200 MHz) derivative built in small numbers
- Type A Bi-static Doppler Interface Detector (High Frequency Warning Device "Ko")
- Ta-Chi 6 TypeB Fixed Early Warning Device (Fixed Early Warning Device "Otsu") 1943 - 3 meter band (100 MHz) - 60 built
- Ta-Chi 7 TypeB Mobile Early Warning Device (Mobile Early Warning Device "Otsu") Transportable version of the Ta-Chi 6
- Ta-Chi 13 Aircraft Guidance System
- Ta-Chi 18 TypeB Portable Early Warning Device (Portable Early Warning Device "Otsu") - 3 meter band (100 MHz) - 400 built
- Ta-Chi 20 Fixed Early Warning Device Receiver (for Ta-Chi 6)
- Ta-Chi 24 Mobil Anti-Aircraft Radar (Japanese-built Würzburg radar)
- Ta-Chi 28 Aircraft Guidance Device
- Ta-Chi 31 Ground-Based Target Tracking Radar Model 4 Modify
- Ta-Chi 35 Height finding radar

=== Airborne radar ===
- Ta-Ki 1 Model 1 Airborne Surveillance Radar
- Ta-Ki 1 Model 2 Airborne Surveillance Radar
- Ta-Ki 1 Model 3 Airborne Surveillance Radar
- Ta-Ki 11 ECM Device
- Ta-Ki 15 Aircraft Guidance Device Receiver (for Ta-Chi 13)

=== Shipborne radar ===
- Ta-Se 1 Anti-Surface Radar
- Ta-Se 2 Anti-Surface Radar

=== Medium bomber, with control air-to-air missile device ===
- Mitsubishi Ki-67 Hiryu "Peggy" I KAI Go-IA: This experimental modification was for managed air-to-air guided missile evaluations, during 1944–1945.

=== Guided missiles ===
- Mitsubishi Ki-147 I-Gо̄ Model 1 Kо̄ Air-to-Surface Radio-Guided Missile
- Kawasaki Ki-148 I-Gо̄ Model 1 Otsu Air-to-Surface Radio-Guided Missile
- Missile I-Gо̄ Type 1-Hei
- "Ke-Go" IR Guidance Air to Surface Missile

== Navy radar ==
Radar used by the Imperial Japanese Navy

=== Land-based radar ===
Designation	Type	Antenna	Wave length	Peak output	Pulse length (μS)	PRF (Hz)	Detection range single aircraft	Detection range formation	Weight	First operational	Number built
Type 2 Mark 1 Model 1 "11"	Fixed early warning radar	Two rows of three dipoles	3 m	5 kW	20	1,000	130 km	250 km	8,700 kg	March 1942	30 total (all marks)
Type 2 Mark 1 Model 1 Mod 1 "11-1"	Fixed early warning radar	Two rows of three dipoles	3 m	5 kW	20	1,000	130 km	250 km	8,700 kg	May 1942	30 total (all marks)
Type 2 Mark 1 Model 1 Mod 2 "11-2"	Fixed early warning radar	Two rows of three dipoles	3 m	20 kW	40	500	130 km	250 km	8,700 kg	May 1943	30 total (all marks)
Type 2 Mark 1 Model 1 Mod 3 "11-3"	Fixed early warning radar	Two rows of three dipoles	3 m	20 kW	40	500	130 km	250 km	8,700 kg	July 1943	30 total (all marks)
Type 2 Mark 1 Model 2 "12-Go"	Ground based mobile	Dipole array with a mat type reflector	1.5 m	5 kW	10	1,000	50 km	100 km	6,000 kg	December 1942	50 total (all marks)
Type 2 Mark 1 Model 2 Mod 2 "12-Go"	Ground based mobile	Dipole array with a mat type reflector	2 m	5 kW	10	1,000	50 km	100 km	6,000 kg	December 1943	50 total (all marks)
Type 2 Mark 1 Model 2 Mod 3 "12-Go"	Ground based mobile	Dipole array with a mat type reflector	2 m	5 kW	10	500	150 km effective 300 km max		6,000 kg	January 1944	50 total (all marks)
Type 3 Mark 1 Model 1 "11-Go"	Shore based medium size radar	Two arrays of 5 dipoles	2 m	10 kW	20	500	150 km effective 300 km max			October 1943	unknown
Type 3 Mark 1 Model 3 "13-Go"	Multi-purpose portable early warning radar. Adapted for submarine use	Dipole array with mat type reflector	2 m	10 kW	10	500	50 km	100 km	110 kg	August 1943	1,000
Type 3 Mark 1 Model 4 "14-Go"	Ship-borne long-Range air search	Four two element yagis	6 m	100 kW	20	250	250 km	360 km to 450 km	30,000 kg	May 1945	2 to 5
Type 2 Mark 4 Model 1 S3	Anti-aircraft Fire-Control Radar (Copy of SCR-268)	2 × 4 dipole array with mat type reflector	1.5 m	13 kW	3	2,000	20 km	40 km	5,000 kg	August 1943	50
Type 2 Mark 4 Model 2 S24	Anti-aircraft Fire-Control Radar (Copy of SCR-268)	4 Yagis	1.5 m	13 kW	3	1,000	20 km	40 km	5,000 kg	October 1944	60

=== Airborne radar ===
Designation	Type	Antenna	Wave length	Peak output	Pulse length (μS)	PRF (hz)	Detection range single aircraft	Detection range formation	Weight	First operational	Number built
Type 3 Mark 6 Model 4 (Type H6)	Airborne radar	Yagi type	2 m	3 kW	10		70 km	100 km	110 kg	August 1942	2,000
Type FM-1	Air and surface search radar	Yagi Type	2 m	42 kW			70 km	100 km	70 kg	September 1944	Experimental only
Type N6	Air and surface search radar	Yagi type	1.2 m	2 kW			50 km	70 km	60 kg	October 1944	20
Type FM-3	Air and surface search radar	Yagi type	2 m	2 kW			50 km	70 km	60 kg	June 1945	100
FD-2	Air and surface search radar	Yagi type	0.25 m	2 kW			<10 km	3 km	70 kg	August 1944	100

- Type 5 Model 1 Radio Location Night Vision Device

=== Shipborne radar ===
- Type 2 Mark 2 Model 1 Air Search Radar ("21-Go" Air Search Radar)
- Type 2 Mark 2 Model 2 Modify 3 Anti-Surface, Fire-assisting Radar for Submarine ("21-Go" Modify 3 Anti-Surface, Fire-assisting Radar)
- Type 2 Mark 2 Model 2 Modify 4 Anti-Surface, Fire-assisting Radar for Ship ("21-Go" Modify 4 Anti-Surface, Fire-assisting Radar)
- Type 2 Mark 3 Model 1 Anti-Surface Fire-Control Radar ("31-Go" Anti Surface Fire-Control Radar)
- Type 2 Mark 3 Model 2 Anti-Surface Fire-Control Radar ("32-Go" Anti Surface Fire-Control Radar)
- Type 2 Mark 3 Model 3 Anti-Surface Fire-Control Radar ("33-Go" Anti Surface Fire-Control Radar)

=== Radar-equipped bomber devices for maritime reconnaissance/antisubmarine patrol ===
- Mitsubishi G3M3 (Model 23) "Nell": This bomber for long range capacity, in 1943, was used as a Maritime reconnaissance/Radar aircraft for long range missions and some electronic warfare work in the seas.
- Mitsubishi G4M1 (Model 11/12) "Betty": From 1942, the G4M of this model was also used for the same purpose as the G3M bomber, for maritime long range capacities with sea radar and electronic warfare equipment.
- Nakajima B5N2 "Kate"/Nakajima B6N1-2 Tenzan "Jill": In 1944, some torpedo bombers of mentioned types used with antisubmarine, radar detection (with finding radar equipment) and similar purposes in maritime short or medium range missions from carriers or land bases.
- Aichi E13A1b "Jake" Mark 11B: like model 11A, added Air-Surface radar and other night conversion with radar (E13A1b-S).
- Kawanishi H6K2,4 and 5 "Mavis" Marks 11,22 and 23: More powerful engines, for ultra long range missions, long range sea radio equipment and air-surface finding radar added.
- Kawanishi H8K2 "Emily" Mark 12: more potent engines for ultra-long range maritime recon missions, major heavy armament; also long range sea radio equipment and air-surface search radar added
- Kawanishi E7K2 "Alf" Mark 2: short range hydroplane, was installing magnetic detection equipment and finding surface radar for short range patrol and antisubmarine missions
- Kyushu Q3W1 Nankai (South Sea): two place version of training aircraft Kyūshū K11W1 Shiragiku, for anti-submarine patrol - was equipped with sea-surface finding antisubmarine sonar (one prototype)
- Kyūshū Q1W1 Tokai "Lorna": Anti-submarine patrol aircraft. Was equipped with sea-surface radar and antisubmarine equipment for escorted convoys in the East China Sea, the Yellow Sea and the Sea of Japan during short times in 1944-45.
- Mitsubishi Q2M Taiyō: Advanced Antisubmarine patrol design, derived from Mitsubishi Ki-67 Hiryū "Peggy" Bomber. Was equipped with magnetic antisubmarine search device, air-surface radar and electronic warfare equipment.

=== Navy air guided missiles ===
- Funryu Type1 Surface to Air Radio Guidance Missile
- Funryu Type2 Surface to Air Radio Guidance Missile
- Funryu Type3 Surface to Air Radio Guidance Missile
- Funryu Type4 Surface to Air Radio Guidance Missile
