= 12.7 cm/40 Type 89 naval gun =

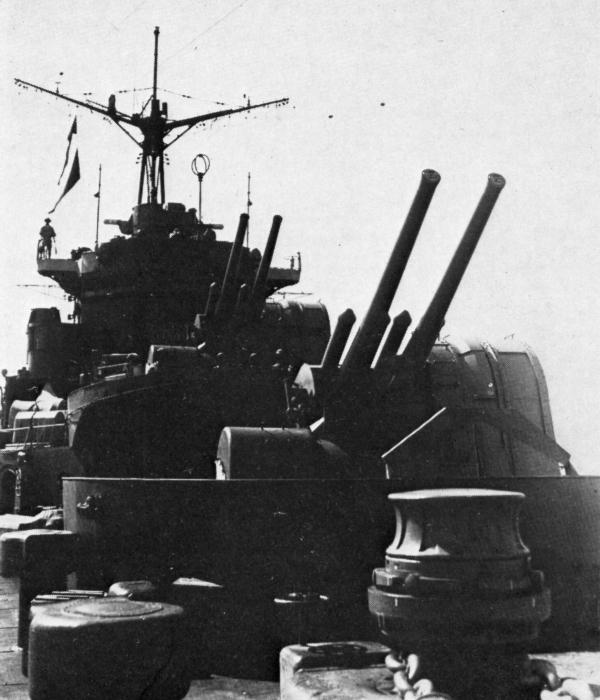
- Type 89 gun mounted on Chitose
- Type: Naval gun anti-aircraft gun
- Place of origin: Empire of Japan

Service history
- In service: 1932–45
- Used by: Imperial Japanese Navy
- Wars: World War II

Production history
- Designed: 1928–32
- Produced: 1932–45
- No. built: ~1500
- Variants: Type 88

Specifications
- Mass: 3,100 kilograms (6,834 lb)
- Barrel length: 5,080 millimeters (16 ft 8 in) (bore length)
- Shell: Fixed 127 x 580mm .R
- Shell weight: 20.9–23.45 kilograms (46.1–51.7 lb)
- Caliber: 12.7-centimeter (5.0 in)
- Breech: horizontal breech block
- Elevation: -8° to +90°
- Rate of fire: 8-14 rounds per minute
- Muzzle velocity: 720–725 meters per second (2,360–2,380 ft/s)
- Maximum firing range: 9,440 meters (30,970 ft) at 90° (AA ceiling); 14,800 meters (48,600 ft) at 45°

The 12.7 cm/40 Type 89 naval gun (40 Kokei Hachikyu Shiki 12 Senchi 7 Kokakuho) was a Japanese anti-aircraft (AA) gun introduced before World War II. It was the Imperial Japanese Navy's standard heavy AA gun during the war. The Type 89 was adopted by the IJN on February 6, 1932, and was the primary anti-aircraft gun on new aircraft carriers, battleships and cruisers, most commonly installed in twin gun mounts. It was used as the primary armament of the Matsu-class destroyers. As IJN ships were upgraded in the 1930s and 1940s, older AA guns such as 8 cm/40 3rd Year Type naval gun and 12 cm/45 10th Year Type naval guns were replaced with Type 89s.
