= Attack on Ōminato =

Part of Pacific War, World War II

- Part of Pacific War, World War II
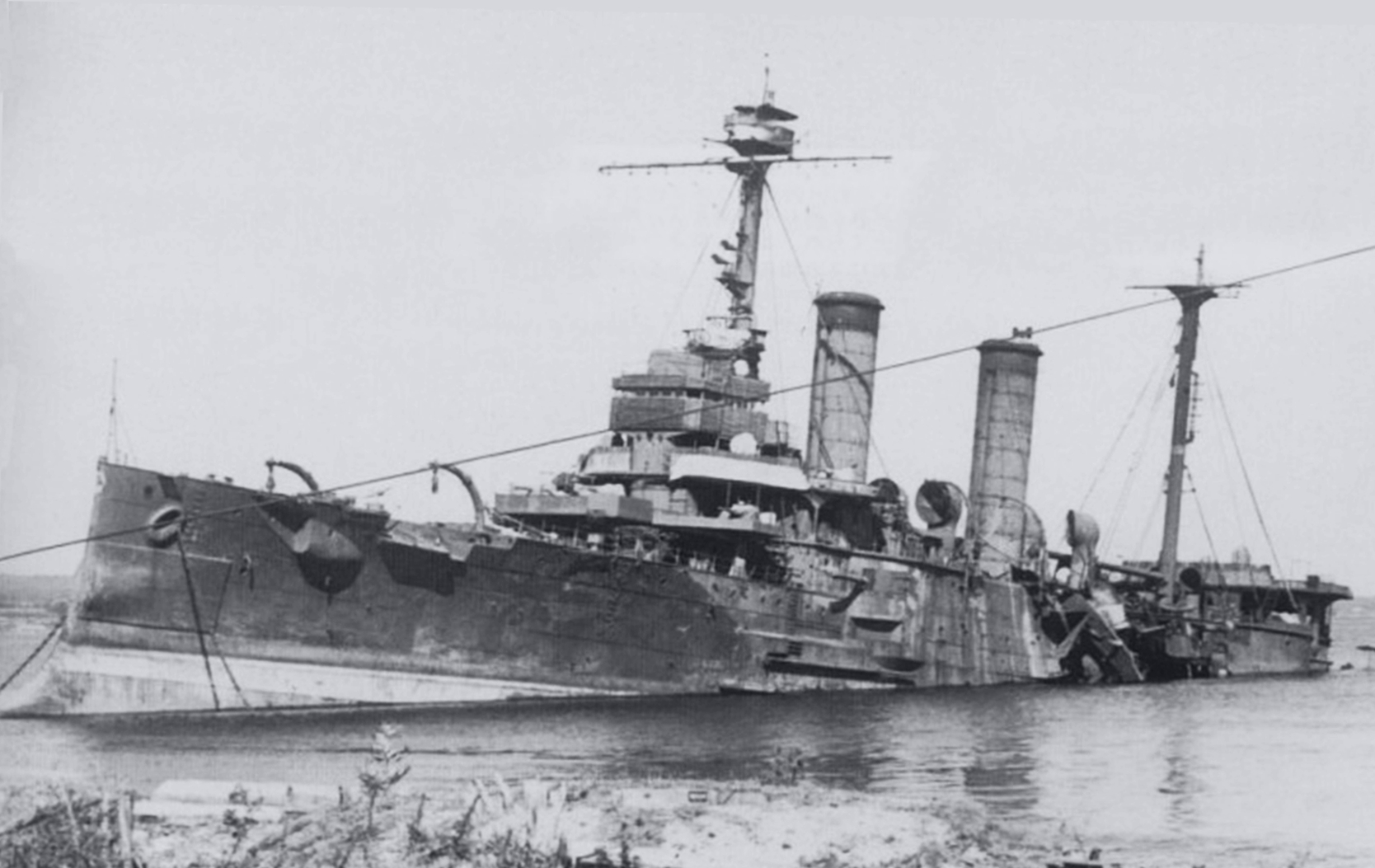
- The wreck of Japanese cruiser Tokiwa in 1945
Date	9–10 August 1945
Location	Ōminato (part of present-day Mutsu), Japan
Status	Allied victory

Belligerents
United States; United Kingdom	Empire of Japan

Commanders and leaders
(United States) William Halsey (United States) John S. McCain	(Empire of Japan) Kanji Ugaki

Units involved
(United States) Third Fleet: (United States) Task Force 38; Task Force 37	Imperial Japanese Navy: Ōminato Guard District

Casualties and losses
Ōminato: 6 aircraft destroyed	Ōminato: 129 killed 1 armored cruiser grounded 1 destroyer heavily damaged 1 auxiliary minelayer damaged 1 dry dock damaged Across northern Honshu and Hokkaido: Numerous auxiliary and merchant ships sunk or damaged 251 aircraft destroyed 141 aircraft damaged

The attack on Ōminato were air raids conducted by the United States Navy on 9–10 August 1945 during the last days of the Pacific War. Ōminato was home to the Ōminato Guard District headquarters and the site of a major Japanese naval base and dockyard. The attacks were part of a larger raid directed at a buildup of Japanese aircraft in northern Honshu which Allied intelligence believed were to be used to conduct a commando raid against B-29 bases in the Marianas.

== Background ==
Ōminato, located in Mutsu Bay near the modern city of Mutsu in Aomori, was home to the Imperial Japanese Navy's Ōminato Guard District headquarters and a major naval base. In August 1945, the base hosted around 20 ships, including the minelayer Tokiwa, a converted armored cruiser serving as the flagship, auxiliary minelayers which included Kōei Maru and Chitose Maru, the naval auxiliary transport Ukishima Maru, and the damaged destroyer Yanagi. These forces were tasked with laying defensive minefields in the Northern Honshu-Hokkaido region and guarding against any potential Allied incursions. In the month leading up to the raid, United States Navy carrier forces had already struck other major Japanese naval district headquarters, including Kure and Yokosuka, sinking almost all of the Imperial Japanese Navy's remaining major warships.

== Attack ==
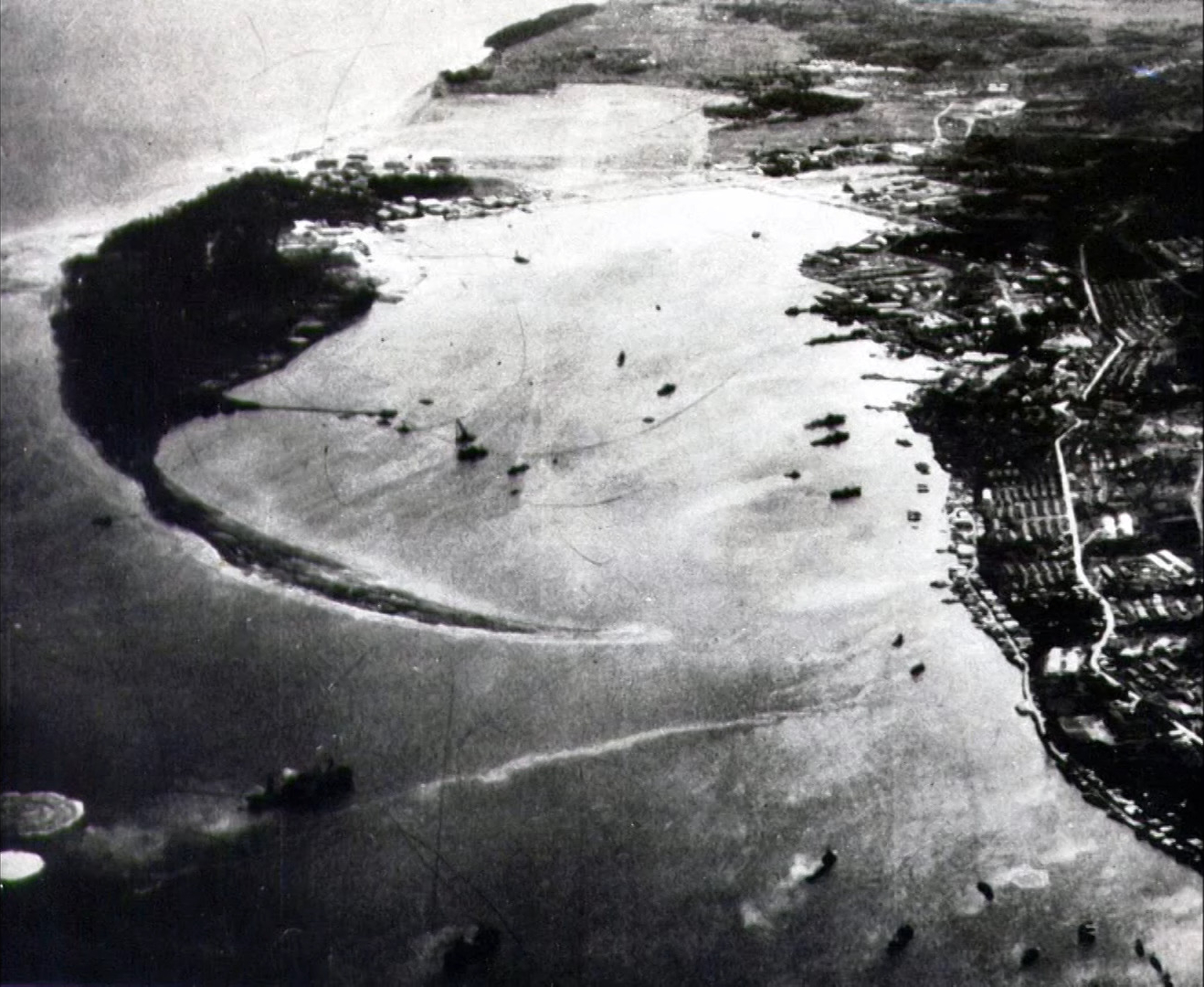
Tokiwa (bottom left) comes under attack by aircraft from the Essex carrier air group in Ōminato, 9 August

From 9 August to 10 August, carrier-based aircraft from the United States Navy's Task Force 38 conducted extensive air raids across northern Honshu. The attacks targeted Japanese aircraft concentrations, which Allied intelligence suspected were preparing for a commando raid against B-29 bases in the Marianas.

The first wave of 32 aircraft tasked with attacking shipping at Ōminato Naval Base, took off from Randolph at 5 a.m. but diverted due to poor weather to attack targets of opportunity at Hachinohe Harbor, where the escort vessel Inagi was sunk. This wave of aircraft alerted the Japanese ships at Ōminato before the base was struck at noon. The mine laying units at port were carrying around 3,000 mines intended for deployment in Hokkaido, concerned that an accidental detonation could devastate the harbor and town, the commander of the minelaying forces, Captain Nakanishi, ordered all the mines to be dumped into the middle of Mutsu Bay.

After disposing of the mines, the ships sailed back toward Ōminato to defend the city. At around 1335, 45 carrier aircraft from USS Randolph and Essex attacked Ōminato, targeting shipping within the bay. Ships in the bay and land-based artillery returned intense and accurate fire, Tokiwa was retrofitted with ten 25 mm Type 96 AA guns in single mounts and air search radars. AA fire downed one Corsair and two Helldivers, one additional Helldiver from Randolph was forced to ditch in the water, where the crew was subsequently picked up by a destroyer. Despite this heavy opposition, Tokiwa, Yanagi and Kōei Maru were heavily damaged. Tokiwa suffered from a direct bomb hit and four near misses, her steering room and No. 4 mine storage compartment were flooded, resulting in a loss of power. A total of 109 sailors were killed in action, and 82 others were wounded. Although the gradual flooding was initially controlled with pumps, the damaged minelayer was eventually towed to shallow waters beached in Ashizaki Bay to avoid sinking.

During the 9 August strike on Ōminato, Lt. (jg) Vernon T. Coumbe's Corsair was hit by anti-aircraft fire and forced to ditch near Nakanosawa, where he swam to shore and evaded capture overnight. The following day, aircraft from the Essex's first strike wave sighted Coumbe, and as strikes continued on Northern Honshu, a search and rescue force consisting of three Corsairs and one Hellcat from Essex escorting two Kingfisher seaplanes from battleship North Carolina was launched. Off the shore of Ōminato, Lt. (jg) Clinton Wear, one of Coumbe's squadmates, was killed when his Corsair crashed while attempting to drop a life raft. One Kingfisher from North Carolina was lost after heavy surf threw its pilot overboard while he was attempting to pass a line to Coumbe, causing the unmanned aircraft to accelerate away and draw Japanese fire. Coumbe and the Kingfisher pilot were subsequently rescued by the second Kingfisher. Coumbe's rescue has been described as the only rescue of an Allied airman from the Japanese home islands during World War II.

Also on the 9th, TF 37 (British Pacific Fleet) and TF 38 aircraft sank auxiliary minesweeper No.2 Kongo Maru, escort vessels Amakusa and Ōhama off Onagawa. During this action, Canadian Lieutenant Robert Hampton Gray's Corsair was shot down after he led an attack on a group of Japanese vessels. He scored a direct hit with a 500-lb bomb on the Amakusa and was posthumously awarded the Victoria Cross. He was one of the last Canadian casualties of the war.

On 10 August, carrier planes of TF 38 and the TF 37 continued strikes across northern Honshu, including areas of the Ōminato Guard District. TF 38 aircraft sank the submarine chaser Ch 42 and minesweeper W-1 in Yamada Bay. Numerous other merchant ships and Japanese auxiliary vessels were sunk in the attacks, including fast transport T-21, submarine chasers Shintohoku Maru, No.6 Takunan Maru, No.63 Hino Maru, and minesweeper W-33, as well as fleet tanker Juko Maru. Naval aviators targeted major air installations such as Misawa, Hachinohe and Matsushima air bases, they claimed a total of 251 aircraft destroyed and a further 141 damaged.

TF 34.8.1 battleships and cruisers under Rear Admiral John F. Shafroth shelled the steel town of Kamaishi on 9 August, which was previously shelled on 14 July.

The attack on Ōminato alone resulted in 129 deaths (109 crew from Tokiwa and 20 from Yanagi) and more than 300 wounded. One dry dock at Ōminato was damaged.

== Aftermath ==
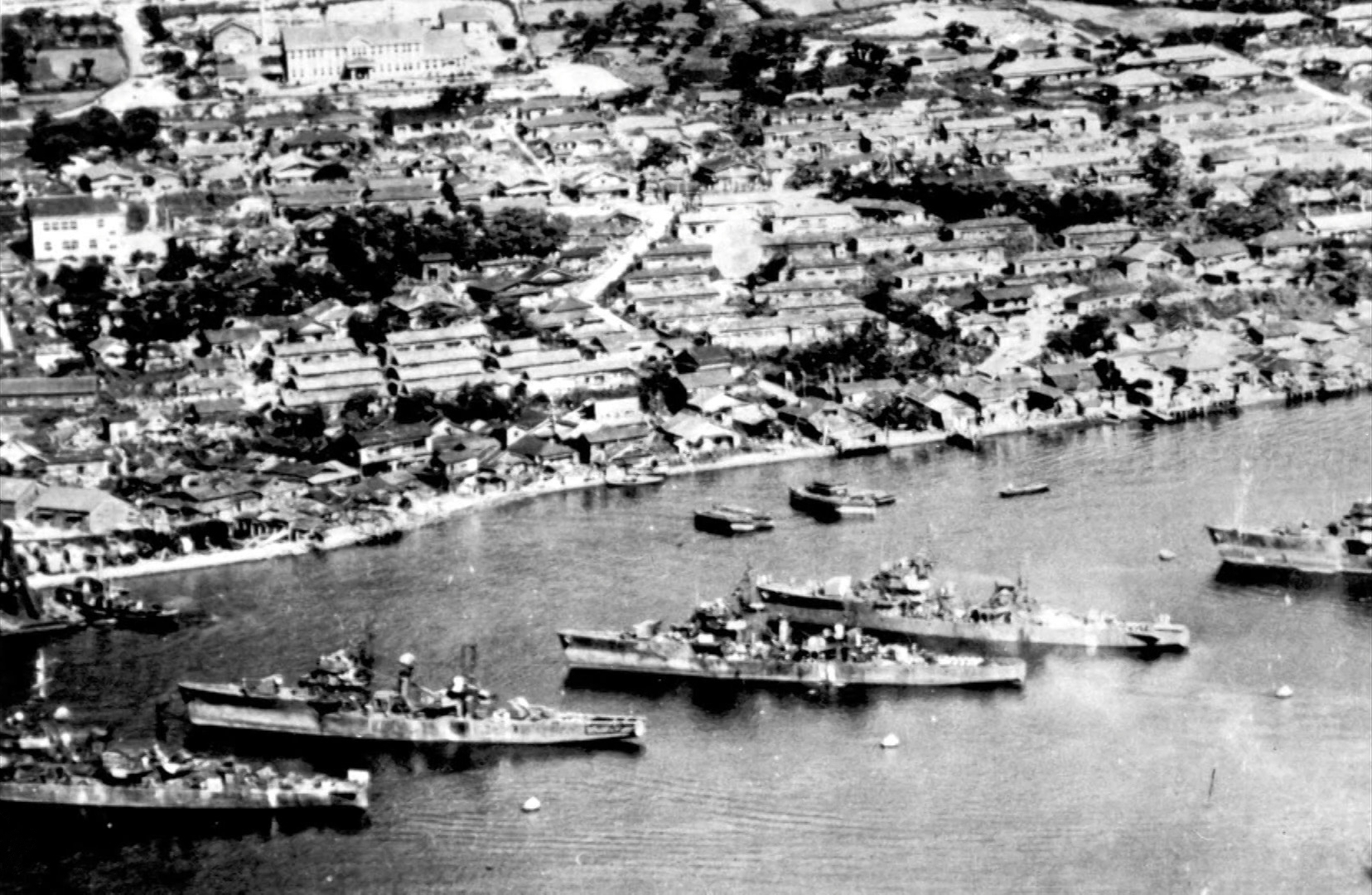
Japanese escort vessels moored in Ōminato Bay immediately after the end of the war

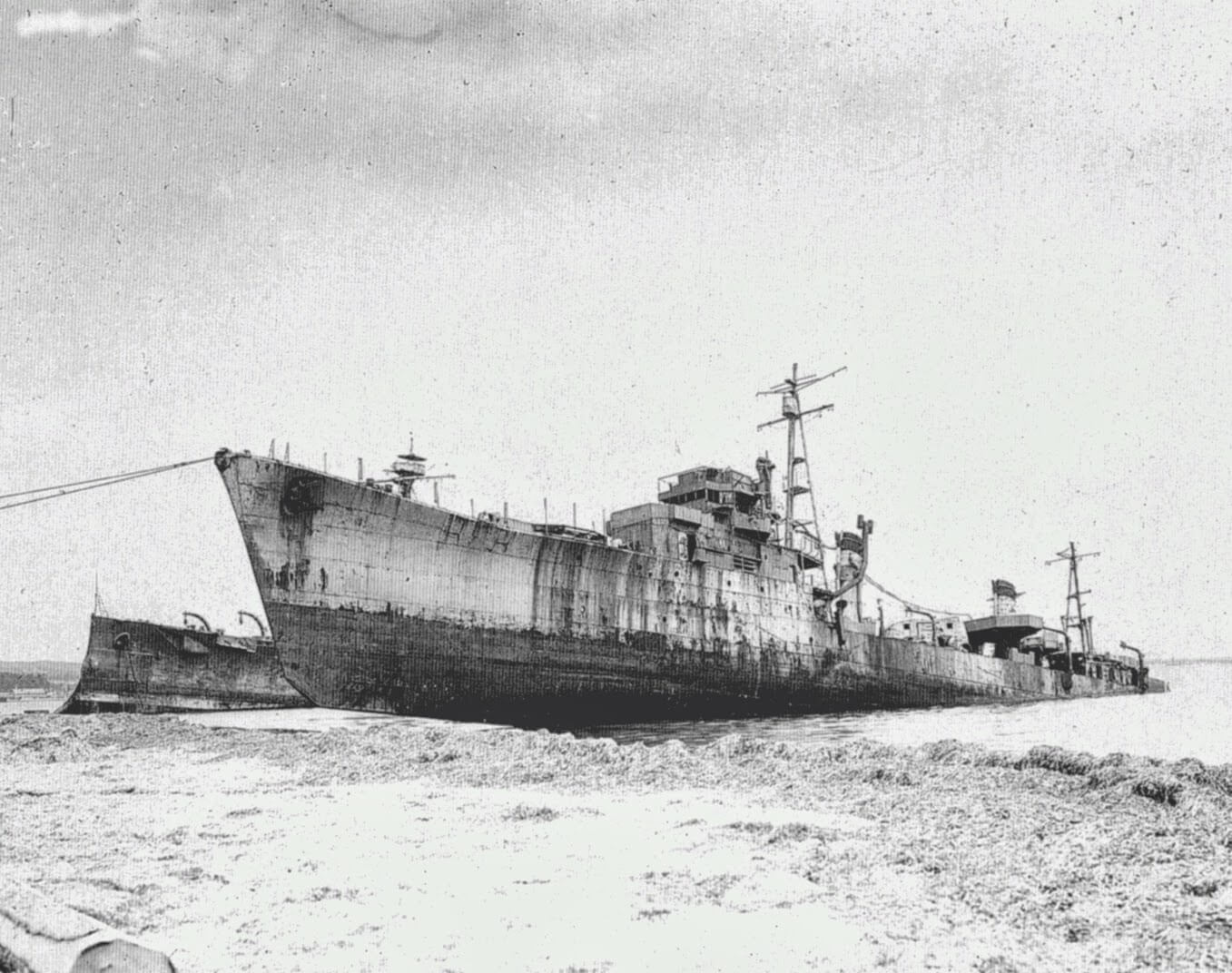
The grounded wrecks of Yanagi and Tokiwa (left) at Ōminato

The raids inflicted additional losses on the Japanese navy, air forces and merchant shipping. It further depleted Japan's defensive capabilities in the final days of the war. American naval losses were minimal, the destroyer John W. Weeks suffered friendly-fire damage off Honshu, and destroyer Borie was hit by a kamikaze.

Although this engagement is sometimes referred to as the last naval battle of the Imperial Japanese Navy, further combat involving Japanese vessels occurred afterward, including an air raid on Kure Naval Base on 11 August, which damaged the destroyer Kaba, submarine I-402, and other ships. Hirohito announced the surrender of Japan 5 days after the attack on Ōminato.
