= Mitsubishi Ki-67 =

Japanese twin-engine medium bomber

Ki-67 Hiryū
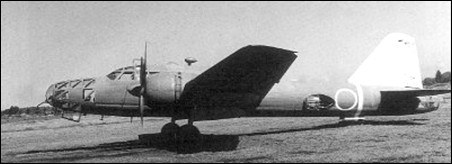
- Mitsubishi Ki-67 of the 170th Bombardment Group on Kengun airfield, Japan, 1945

General information
- Type: Medium bomber (Note: While the Ki-67 was officially designated a "heavy bomber", for the Japanese military the term implied greater crew protection and defensive armament, rather than payload. In all of its key parameters, the type was very similar to the contemporaneous medium bombers of other countries.)
- National origin: Japan
- Manufacturer: Mitsubishi Aircraft Company
- Status: Retired
- Primary users: Imperial Japanese Army Air Service Imperial Japanese Navy Air Service
- Number built: 767

History
- Introduction date: October 1944
- First flight: 27 December 1942
- Retired: August 1945
- Variant: Mitsubishi Q2M

The Mitsubishi Ki-67 Hiryū (飛龍, flying dragon), Allied reporting name "Peggy", was a twin-engine bomber produced by Mitsubishi Aircraft Company and used by the Imperial Japanese Army Air Service and Imperial Japanese Navy Air Service in World War II. While its original official designation was "Army Type 4 Heavy Bomber" (四式重爆撃機, Yon-shiki jū bakugeki-ki), in all of its key parameters, the Ki-67 was similar to the contemporaneous medium bombers of other countries. (Note: At the time, under Japanese military parlance, the designation "heavy bomber" referred to superior crew protection and defensive armament, rather than the bombloads carried (which, in the Ki-67, were significantly lighter than those carried by true heavy bombers of the same era).) Japanese Navy variants included the P2M and Q2M.

== Design ==
The Ki-67 was the result of a 1941 Japanese army specification for a successor to the Nakajima Ki-49 "storm dragon". This new aircraft was specified to be a high-speed twin-engined heavy bomber suitable for possible conflicts with the Soviet Union over the Manchuria-Siberia border, and unlike many Japanese warplanes, was required to have good defensive armament and the ability to survive heavy battle damage. It was also required to be highly manoeuvrable allowing it to carry out dive-bombing attacks and escape at low level.

The Ki-67 was designed by a team led by Kyūnojō Ozawa, chief engineer at Mitsubishi, and was a mid-winged monoplane of all-metal construction, with a retractable tailwheel undercarriage. It was fitted with self-sealing fuel tanks and armor, features common in US fighters and bombers but frequently lacking in Japanese aircraft. With these features and its two 1,417 kW (1,900 hp) 18-cylinder air-cooled radial engines, the Ki-67 was perhaps one of the most sturdy and damage-resistant Japanese aircraft of World War II.

The Ki-67's bomb load of 1,070 kg (2,360 lb) carried in its internal bomb bay would classify it as a medium bomber for the US. The North American B-25 Mitchell could carry up to 2,722 kg (6,000 lb), the Martin B-26 Marauder up to 1,814 kg (4,000 lb), and the Douglas A-20 Havoc up to 907 kg (2,000 lb), for example, but they rarely carried a maximum load; when they did, their range was reduced significantly. Japanese aircraft almost invariably had greater range with their rated maximum load; this gave them a strategic capability unlike that of Allied twin-engine bombers, which were considered tactical bombers.

The Ki-67's performance was remarkable compared to US medium bombers. The Ki-67 had a level-flight top speed of 537 km/h (334 mph), against 443 km/h (275 mph) for the B-25, 462 km/h (287 mph) for the B-26, and 538 km/h (338 mph) for the A-20. The Ki-67 also had good manoeuvrability in high-speed dives (up to 644 km/h/400 mph), excellent sustained rate of climb, and outstanding agility (excellent turn rate, small turn radius, and ability to turn at low speeds). The manoeuvrability of the Ki-67 was so good that the Japanese used the design as the basis for the Mitsubishi Ki-109 twin-engine fighter, originally designed as a night fighter, and later for use as a daylight heavy fighter. In the last stages of World War II, the Japanese Navy also used the design as the basis for the Mitsubishi Q2M1 "Tai'yō" radar-equipped anti-submarine aircraft.

Armament of the Ki-67 included a dorsal turret with a 20 mm (.79 in) Ho-5 cannon, in addition to 12.7 mm (.50 in) Ho-103 machine guns in the tail, nose, and beam positions. Some aircraft were fitted with a 20 mm gun in the tail position, and early models used 7.7 mm (.303in) Type 89 machine guns in the beam positions.

== Operations ==
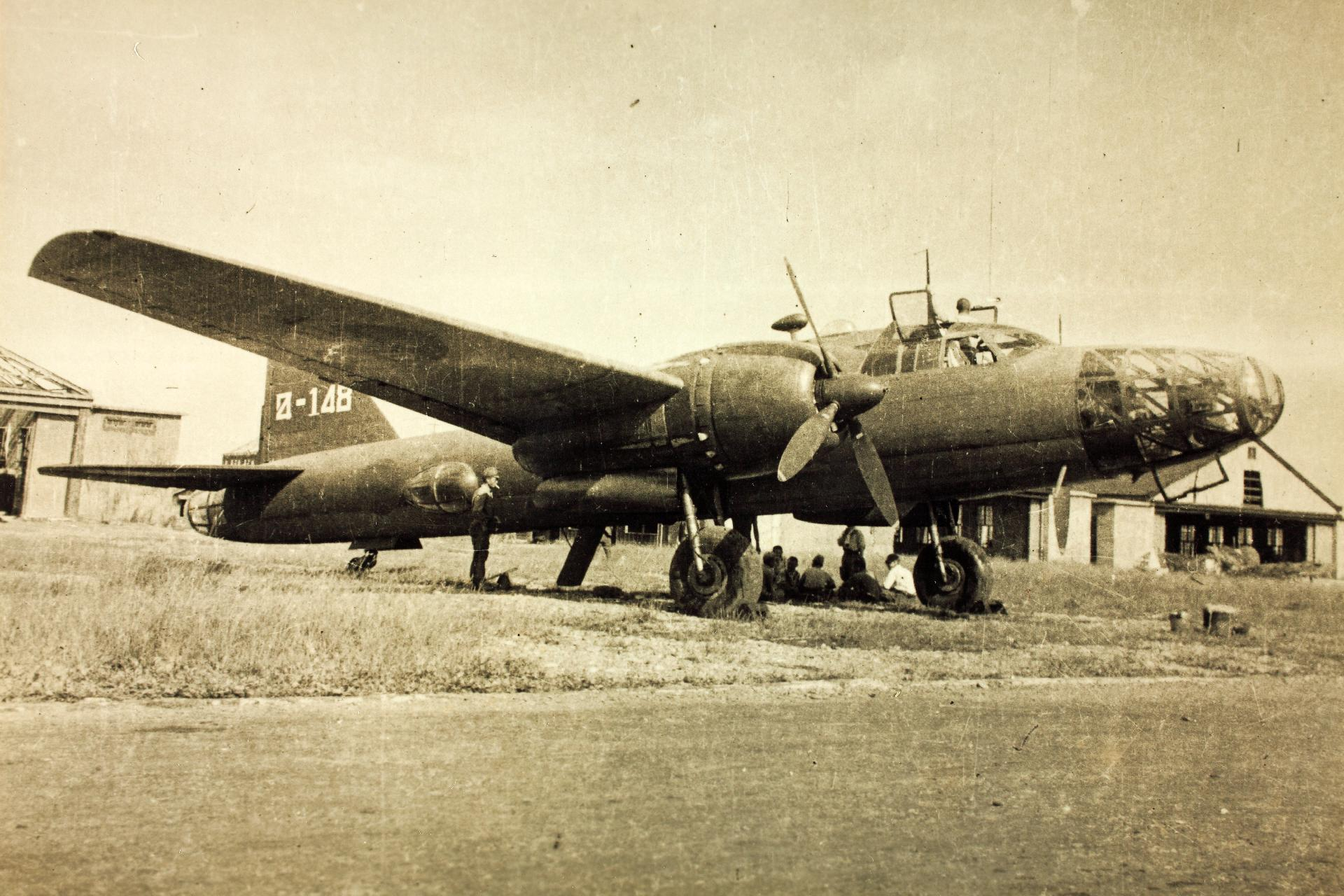
Ki-67 74-148 of the 74th Hikō Sentai. (Matsumoto airfield, Japan, 1945.)

The Ki-67 was used for level bombing and torpedo bombing; it could carry one torpedo attached under the fuselage. The Ki-67 was initially used by the Japanese Army and Navy Air Services against the US Third Fleet, during its strikes against Formosa and the Ryukyu Islands. It was later used at Okinawa, in Mainland China, French Indochina, Karafuto, and against B-29 airfields in Saipan and Tinian. One special ground-strike version used in the Giretsu missions was a Ki-67 I with three remote-control 20 mm cannons angled at 30° for firing toward the ground, a 20 mm cannon in the tail, 13.2 mm (.51 in) Type 3 machine guns in the lateral and upper positions, and more fuel capacity. Even with more fuel, the Giretsu missions were one-way only because of the long range. In the last stages of World War II, special attack versions of the Ki-67 (the I Kai and Sakura-dan models) were used in kamikaze missions. (References include information from Lt. Sgt. Seiji Moriyama, a crew member in Fugaku Special Attack Unit, who witnessed Ki-67's being converted into To-Gō suicide planes with two 800 kg/1,760 lb bombs during Okinawa operations.)

By the end of World War II, 767 Ki-67s had been produced. Other sources relate that 698 Ki-67's were manufactured, excluding the Kai and Sakura-dan conversions.

== Variants ==
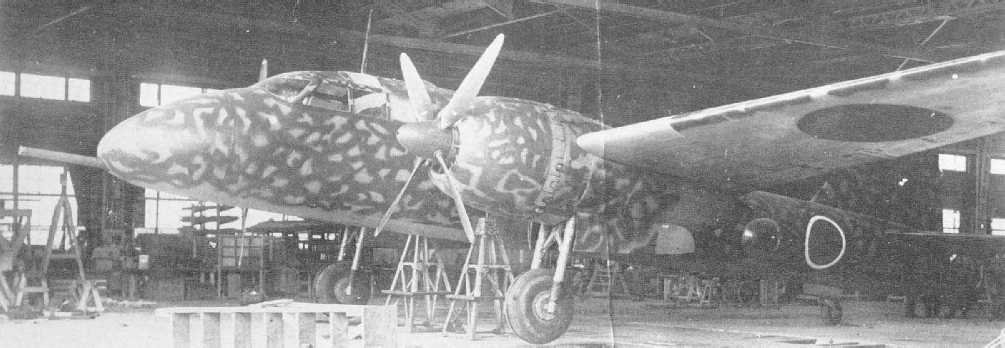
Ki-109

- Ki-67-I: Prototypes. Diverse models with various types of weapons. 19 produced.
- Ki-67-Ia "Hiryū" Army Type 4 Heavy Bomber Model 1: Main production model. The majority (420+) were modified in the factory as land-based torpedo bombers (after work-number 160). Produced by Mitsubishi: 587; by Kawasaki: 91; by 1° Army Arsenal of Tachikawa: 1.
- Ki-67-Ib: Late production model. Reinforced the tail gun turret (2 × 20 mm).
- Ki-67-I Kai: Experimental model equipped with Mitsubishi Ha-104 Ru engines. 3 produced.
- Ki-67-I AEW variant: Equipment the early warning radar "Taki 1 Model II". 1 produced.
- Ki-67 "To-Gō": Army special attack aircraft type 4: Improved version of the Ki-67 I for kamikaze, unarmed, without turrets, and with two 800 kg (1,760 lb) bombs in belly compartment.
- Ki-67 "guided missile mother ship": Experimental type for carrying guided missiles.(Kawasaki Ki-147 I-Go Type 1-Ko, Mitsubishi Ki-148 I-Go Type 1-Otsu, I-Go Type 1-Hei, "Ke-Go" IR, "Ko-Go","Sa-Go") 1 produced.
- Ki-67 long-range bomber variant: Equipped with widened wings and without turrets. Only a project.
- Ki-67 ground attack variant: Version armed with three remote-control ground-firing 5 × 30° 20 mm cannons, 20 mm defensive cannon in the tail position, three 13.2 mm (.51 in) machine guns in lateral and upper positions, and more fuel capacity for long range. Specifically designed for land strikes against B-29 bases in the Marianas. Only a project.
- Ki-67-II: Prototypes. Modified version of the Ki-67-I, with two Mitsubishi Ha-214 engines of 1,581 kW (2,150 hp) each. 2 produced.
- Ki-67 glider tug: A standard Ki67-I was used to tow the "Manazuru" (Crane) transport glider in tests.
- "Yasukuni": Naval torpedo bomber version of the Ki-67-I. Created from Ki-67-Is transferred from the IJAAF.
- Ki-69: Heavily armed escort fighter model. Only a project.
- Ki-97: Transport model. Only a project.
- Ki-109: Night fighter prototypes. Ki-67-I modified for night fighting for operating in pairs, the Ki-109a with a radar/reflector (similar to the British Douglas Havoc II "Turbinlite" concept, only using radio beams rather than a powerful searchlight) for radar transmission and detection and the Ki-109b, armed with twin 37 mm Ho-203 cannon in an upward-firing Schrage Musik-style fixed dorsal mount (as the single Ho-203 autocannon in the Mitsubishi Ki-46-III Kai was) to destroy the objective. Only a project.
- Ki-109: Day Fighter prototypes. Ki-67-I modified for daylight fighting. One fixed 75 mm Type 88 Heavy Cannon in the nose and one trainable 12.7 mm (0.5 in) Ho-103 Type 1 machine gun in the tail. Equipped with Mitsubishi Ha-104 engines of 1,417 kW (1,900 hp) each or turbocharged Ha-104 Ru with 1,417 kW (1,900 hp) each. 2 produced.
- Ki-109 Army Heavy Fighter Interceptor: First non-prototype model of series. Lacking gun positions in upper and side positions and without bomb-bay compartments. Fixed 75 mm Type 88 Heavy Cannon in the nose retained from Day Fighter prototype. Had a revised version of tail gun. 22 constructed by Mitsubishi.
- Ki-112: Bomber escort fighter made with a wooden construction. Armed with 8 x 12.7mm and 1 x 20mm. Only a project.
- Ki-167 "Sakura-dan": "Special Attack" (kamikaze) version equipped with one shaped charge thermite bomb of 2,900 kg (6,400 lb) in the fuselage behind the crew cabin. The shape of the bomb conducted the blast forward, projecting a jet capable of reaching nearly a mile with a maximum blast radius of 300 m (980 ft). The bomb was designed to breach emplacements as well as to destroy massed formations of armor. 9 produced.
- Q2M1 Tai'yō: Navy variant of Ki-67-I, for anti-submarine warfare. Equipped with radar (Type3 Model 1 MAD (KMX), Type 3 Ku-6 Model 4 Radar, and ESM Antenna equipment). Had two Mitsubishi Kasei 25 Otsu engines of 1,380 kW (1,850 hp) each with six-blade propellers. Carried torpedoes or depth charges. Project only.

== Operators ==
=== Wartime ===
Japan

- Imperial Japanese Army Air Service
  - Hamamatsu Instructing Flying Division
  - 7th Hikō Sentai
  - 14th Hikō Sentai
  - 60th Hikō Sentai
  - 61st Hikō Sentai
  - 62nd Hikō Sentai
  - 74th Hikō Sentai
  - 110th Hikō Sentai
  - 170th Bombardment Group (ex-60th Hikō Sentai and 110th Hikō Sentai)
- Imperial Japanese Navy Air Service
  - 11th Air Flotilla

== Specifications (Ki-67-Ib) ==
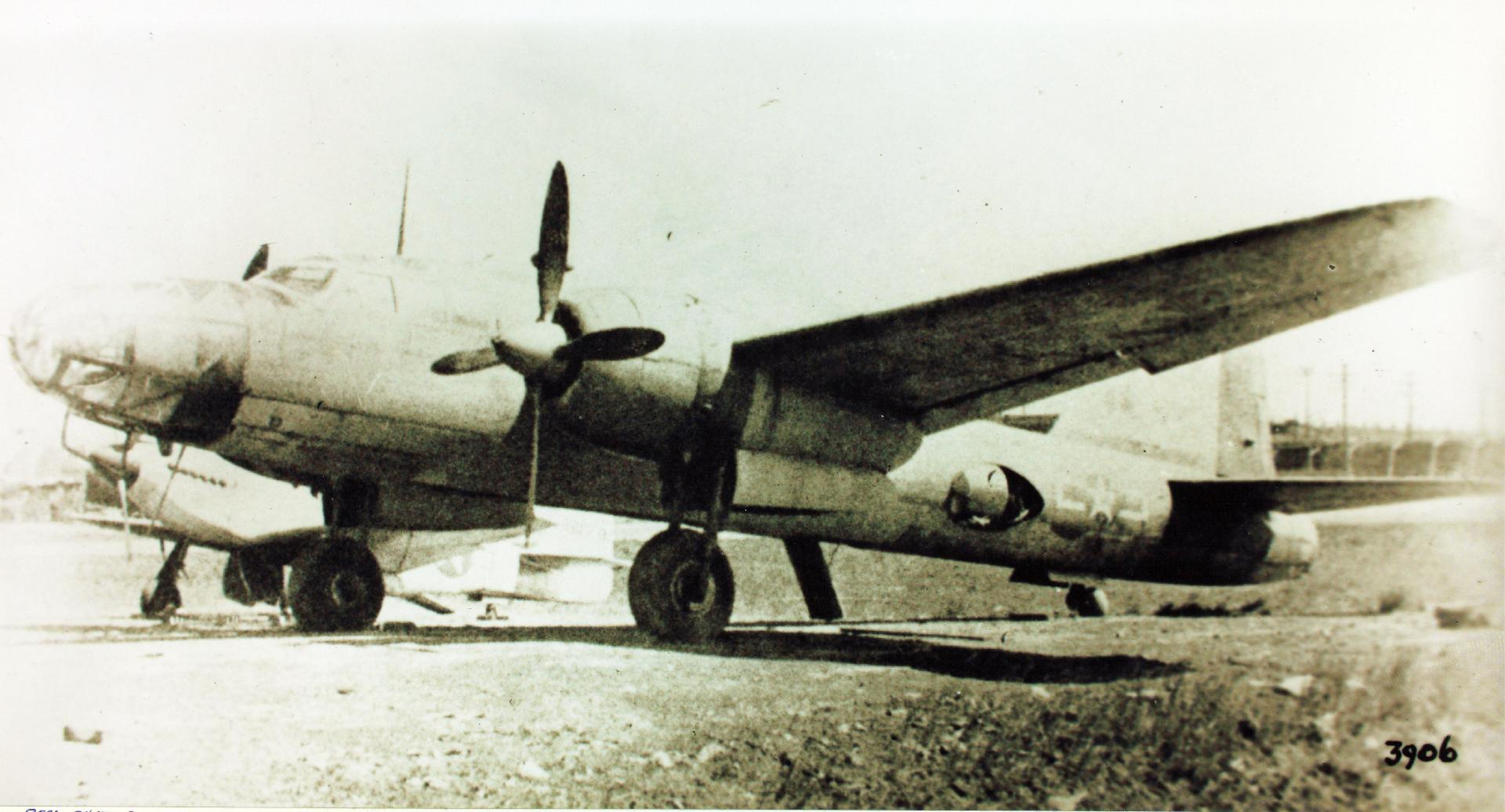
A captured Ki-67

Data from Japanese Aircraft of the Pacific War

General characteristics

- Crew: 6–8
- Length: 18.7 m (61 ft 4 in)
- Wingspan: 22.5 m (73 ft 10 in)
- Height: 7.7 m (25 ft 3 in)
- Wing area: 65.85 m^{2} (708.8 sq ft)
- Empty weight: 8,649 kg (19,068 lb)
- Gross weight: 13,765 kg (30,347 lb)
- Powerplant: 2 × Mitsubishi Ha104 ("Army Type 4 1,900hp Air Cooled Radial") 18-cylinder air-cooled radial piston engines, 1,400 kW (1,900 hp) each for take-off (Note: 1,350 kW (1,810 hp) at 2,200 m (7,200 ft), 1,200 kW (1,610 hp) at 6,100 m (20,000 ft))
- Propellers: 4-bladed constant-speed metal propellers

Performance

- Maximum speed: 537 km/h (334 mph, 290 kn) at 6,090 m (19,980 ft)
- Cruise speed: 400 km/h (250 mph, 220 kn) at 8,000 m (26,000 ft)
- Range: 2,800 km (1,700 mi, 1,500 nmi)
- Ferry range: 3,800 km (2,400 mi, 2,100 nmi)
- Service ceiling: 9,470 m (31,070 ft)
- Time to altitude: 6,000 m (20,000 ft) in 14 minutes 30 seconds
- Wing loading: 209 kg/m^{2} (43 lb/sq ft)
- Power/mass: 0.205 kW/kg (0.125 hp/lb)

Armament

- Guns:
  - 1 × 20 mm (0.79 in) Ho-5 cannon in dorsal turret
  - 5 × 12.7 mm (.50in) Ho-103 (Type 1) machine guns, one in nose, 1 in the tail, and 1 in each beam position (late models) (Note: Early models carried magazine-fed 7.7 mm (.303in) Type 89 machine guns in the beam positions.)
- Bombs: 800 kg (1,764 lb) of bombs in internal bay or one torpedo (Note: Kamikaze versions carried 2,900 kg (6,400 lb) of bombs)

== See also ==
Related development

- Mitsubishi Q2M

Aircraft of comparable role, configuration, and era

- Yokosuka P1Y
- Douglas A-26 Invader
- Mitsubishi G4M
- Nakajima Ki-49
- Douglas A-20 Havoc
- Martin B-26 Marauder
- Petlyakov Pe-2
- North American B-25 Mitchell
- Vickers Wellington
- Tupolev Tu-2
- Junkers Ju 88
- Dornier Do 217
- Heinkel He 111

Related lists

- List of aircraft of World War II
