= 252nd Air Group =

252nd Naval Air Group
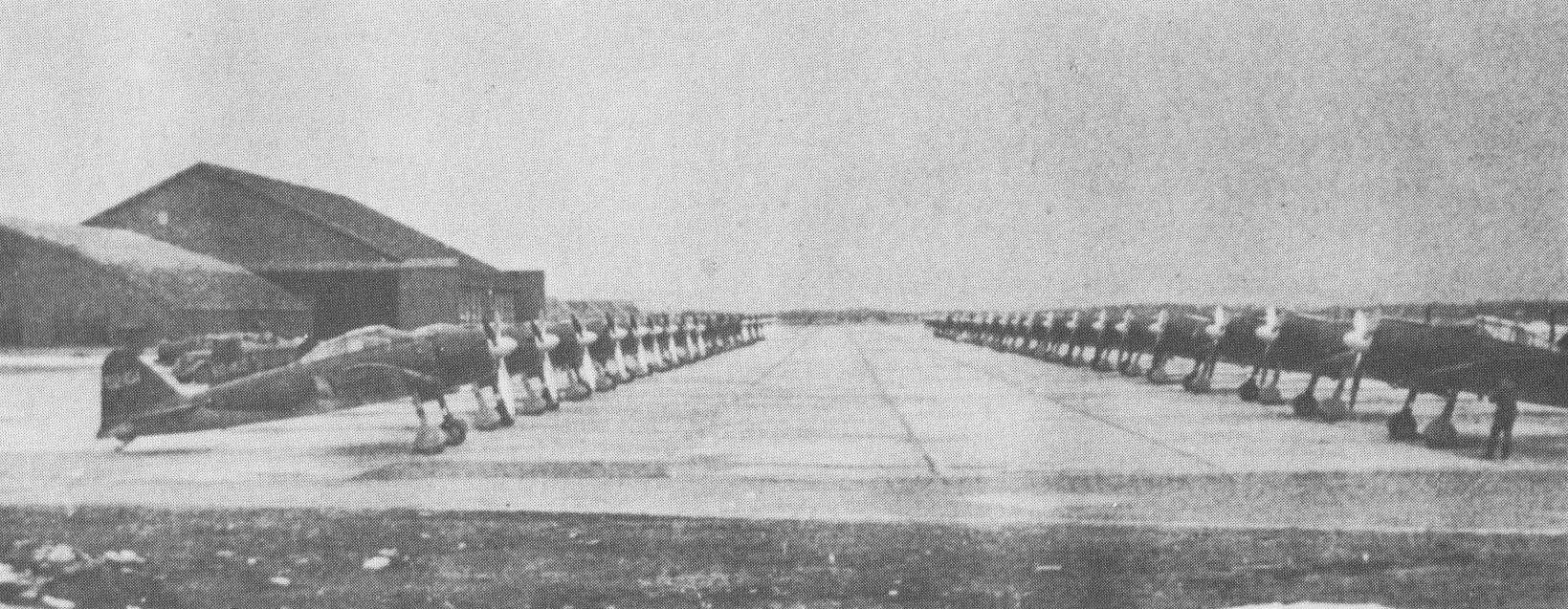
- Air Group 252 zeros at Misawa Air Base in May 1944
- Active: 1 November 1942 – September 1945
- Country: Empire of Japan
- Allegiance: Empire of Japan
- Branch: (Empire of Japan) Imperial Japanese Navy
- Type: Naval aviation unit
- Role: Air superiority Fighter aircraft support
- Size: 45-65 aircraft
- Garrison/HQ: Tateyama Air Base; Misawa Air Base
- Aircraft flown: A6M Zero
- Engagements: World War II: New Guinea Campaign; Guadalcanal Campaign; Gilbert and Marshall Islands campaign; Japan campaign

The 252nd Naval Air Group (第二五二海軍航空隊, Dai 252 Kaigun Kōkūtai) was a fighter aircraft unit of the Imperial Japanese Navy (IJN) during the Pacific campaign of World War II. The unit was formed on 1 November 1942 by separating the fighter squadron from the Genzan Air Group.

The unit, equipped with A6M Zero fighter aircraft, was involved in several major battles in the south and central Pacific from 1942 to 1943, including the Battle of the Bismarck Sea.

After being annihilated in combat over the Marshall Islands in 1943, the unit was reconstituted in Japan in February 1944 and helped defending the home islands against Allied offensives, including B-29 bomber attacks from the Mariana Islands.
