= Japanese destroyer Nire (1944) =

WWII-era Japanese escort destroyer

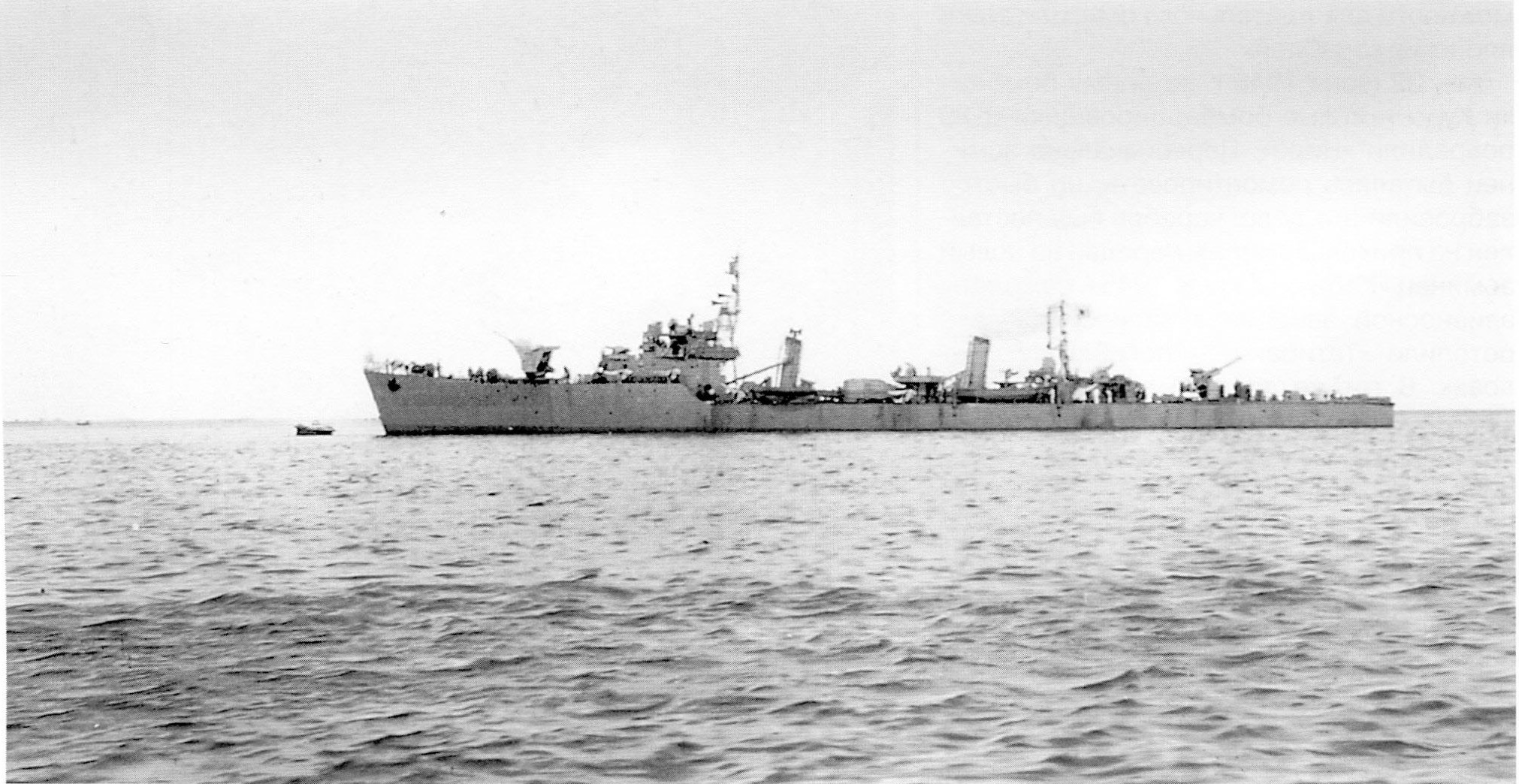
- Nire in January or February 1945

History

Empire of Japan
- Name: Nire
- Namesake: Elm
- Ordered: 1944
- Builder: Maizuru Naval Arsenal
- Laid down: 14 August 1944
- Launched: 25 November 1944
- Completed: 31 January 1945
- Stricken: 5 October 1945
- Fate: Scrapped, 20 April 1948

General characteristics
- Class & type: Tachibana sub-class of the Matsu-class escort destroyer
- Displacement: 1,309 t (1,288 long tons) (standard)
- Length: 100 m (328 ft 1 in) (o/a)
- Beam: 9.35 m (30 ft 8 in)
- Draft: 3.37 m (11 ft 1 in)
- Installed power: 2 × water-tube boilers; 19,000 shp (14,000 kW)
- Propulsion: 2 shafts, 2 × geared steam turbines
- Speed: 27.8 knots (51.5 km/h; 32.0 mph)
- Range: 4,680 nmi (8,670 km; 5,390 mi) at 16 knots (30 km/h; 18 mph)
- Sensors & processing systems: 1 × Type 22 search radar; 1 × Type 13 early-warning radar
- Armament: 1 × twin, 1 × single 127 mm (5 in) DP guns; 4 × triple, 13 × single 25 mm (1 in) AA guns; 1 × quadruple 610 mm (24 in) torpedo tubes; 2 × rails, 2 × throwers for 60 depth charges

Nire (楡; "elm") was one of 23 escort destroyers of the Tachibana sub-class of the Matsu class built for the Imperial Japanese Navy during the final stages of World War II. Completed in early 1945, the ship spent most of her brief career assigned to the Combined Fleet on escort duty. Nire was damaged during a bomber attack on Kure in June; although she was repaired, the ship was placed in reserve the following month. The non-operational destroyer was turned over to the victorious Allies when the Empire of Japan surrendered in August; Nire was scrapped in 1948.

== Design and description ==
The Tachibana sub-class was a simplified version of the preceding Matsu class to make them even more suited for mass production. The ships measured 100 meters (328 ft 1 in) overall length, with a beam of 9.35 meters (30 ft 8 in) and a draft of 3.37 meters (11 ft 1 in). They displaced 1,309 metric tons (1,288 long tons) at standard load and 1,554 metric tons (1,529 long tons) at deep load. The ships had two Kampon geared steam turbines, each driving one propeller shaft, using steam provided by two Kampon water-tube boilers. The turbines were rated at a total of 19,000 shaft horsepower (14,000 kW) for a speed of 27.8 knots (51.5 km/h; 32.0 mph). The Tachibanas had a range of 4,680 nautical miles (8,670 km; 5,390 mi) at 16 knots (30 km/h; 18 mph).

The main armament of the Tachibana sub-class consisted of three Type 89 127-millimeter (5 in) dual-purpose guns in one twin-gun mount aft and one single mount forward of the superstructure. The single mount was partially protected against spray by a gun shield. The accuracy of the Type 89 guns was severely reduced against aircraft because no high-angle gunnery director was fitted. The ships carried a total of 25 Type 96 25-millimeter (1 in) anti-aircraft guns in 4 triple and 13 single mounts. The Tachibanas were equipped with Type 13 early-warning and Type 22 surface-search radars. The ships were also armed with a single rotating quadruple mount amidships for 610-millimeter (24 in) torpedoes. They could deliver their 60 depth charges via two stern rails and two throwers.

== Construction and service ==
Nire (Elm) was ordered in Fiscal Year 1944 under the Wartime Naval Armaments Supplement Program and she was laid down at Maizuru Naval Arsenal on 14 August 1944. The ship was launched on 25 November and completed on 31 January 1945. Nire was assigned that day to Destroyer Squadron 11 under the Combined Fleet for working up, and was briefly attached to the Second Fleet on 1–20 April. On 25 April, she became part of Destroyer Division 52 together with Sugi, Kashi and Kaede which was assigned to Escort Squadron 31 of the Combined Fleet. On 22 June, while at Kure, she was damaged during an air raid by USAAF B-29 Superfortress bombers; repairs at Kure Naval Arsenal lasted until 2 July. On 15 July Nire was reduced to reserve and her crew was transferred to her sister ship Kaba. The ship was turned over to Allied forces at Kure at the time of the surrender of Japan and was stricken from the navy list on 5 October. She was scrapped at Kure on 20 April 1948.

== Bibliography ==
- Jentschura, Hansgeorg; Jung, Dieter & Mickel, Peter (1977). Warships of the Imperial Japanese Navy, 1869–1945. Annapolis, Maryland: United States Naval Institute. ISBN 0-87021-893-X.
- Nevitt, Allyn D. (1998). "IJN Nire: Tabular Record of Movement". www.combinedfleet.com.
- Stille, Mark (2013). Imperial Japanese Navy Destroyers 1919–45 (2): Asahio to Tachibana Classes. Botley, UK: Osprey Publishing. ISBN 978-1-84908-987-6.
- Sturton, Ian (1980). "Japan". In Chesneau, Roger (ed.). Conway's All the World's Fighting Ships 1922–1946. Greenwich, UK: Conway Maritime Press. ISBN 0-85177-146-7.
- Whitley, M. J. (1988). Destroyers of World War Two: An International Encyclopedia. Annapolis, Maryland: Naval Institute Press. ISBN 0-87021-326-1.
