= Mitsubishi Q2M Tai'yō =

Japanese anti-submarine patrol aircraft

Q2M Tai'yō
- Q2M concept drawing

General information
- Type: Anti-Submarine Patrol aircraft
- National origin: Japan
- Manufacturer: Mitsubishi

History
- Developed from: Mitsubishi Ki-67

The Mitsubishi Q2M Tai'yō (大洋, Great Sea / Ocean) design was derived from the Mitsubishi Ki-67-I "Hiryū" heavy/torpedo bomber of the Japanese Army and its Naval variant, "Yasukuni". It was ordered for design and construction in the last stages of war.

== Development ==
Powerful engines of 1,353 kW (1,840 hp) would have been used to drive five-blade propellers. Such an aircraft would have been managed by five or six crew. Due to technical troubles and a long development of the theoretical design, this aircraft did not advance from paper plans in last days of conflict.

== Specification (Q2M) ==
Data from

General characteristics

- Crew: 6
- Length: 18.75 m (61 ft 6 in)
- Wingspan: 25 m (82 ft 0 in)
- Height: 4.75 m (15 ft 7 in)
- Empty weight: 8,850 kg (19,511 lb)
- Gross weight: 13,600 kg (29,983 lb)
- Powerplant: 2 × Mitsubishi Kasei 25 Otsu 14-cylinder air-cooled radial piston engines, 1,353 kW (1,815 hp) each

Performance

- Maximum speed: 490 km/h (300 mph, 260 kn)
- Range: 2,415 km (1,501 mi, 1,304 nmi)
- Service ceiling: 3,704 m (12,200 ft)

Armament

- Guns: 3 × 13 mm (0.51 in) MG 131 machine gun
- Bombs: 4 × 250 kg (550 lb)

Avionics

- Type 3 Model 1 Magnetic Anomaly Detector (KMX)
- Type 3 Ku-6 Model 4 Radar
- ESM Antenna equipment
