= Japanese air attacks on the Mariana Islands =

Raids which targeted United States bases

- Part of the Pacific War, World War II
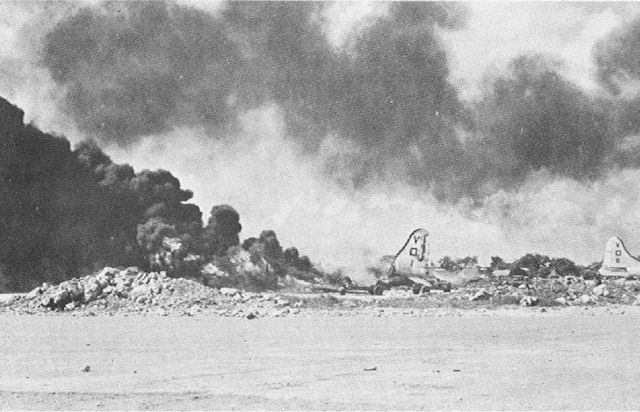
- US aircraft burning in the aftermath of the Japanese attack on Isley Field, November 27, 1944
Date	November 1944 – January 1945
Location	Saipan and Tinian
Result	Inconclusive

Belligerents
Japan	United States

Strength
Over 80 aircraft	Fighter aircraft Anti-aircraft guns

Casualties and losses
37 aircraft destroyed	45 killed 200 wounded 11 aircraft destroyed 43 aircraft damaged

During World War II, a series of Japanese air attacks on the Mariana Islands took place between November 1944 and January 1945. These raids targeted United States Army Air Forces (USAAF) bases and sought to disrupt the bombing of Japan by Boeing B-29 Superfortress heavy bombers operating from the islands. The Japanese lost 37 aircraft during this operation, but destroyed 11 B-29s and damaged a further 43. Preparations were also made for commando raids on the bases in early and mid-1945 but these did not go ahead.

While the attacks on the Mariana Islands did not seriously disrupt the USAAF air campaign, they had an effect on other American operations. After determining that the Japanese raiders were staging through Iwo Jima, American forces stepped up their attacks on that island. While the decision to invade Iwo Jima had been made before the raids commenced, stopping the attacks formed part of the justification for the landing. In addition, further air defense units were deployed to the Mariana Islands to protect the B-29 bases.

== Background ==
United States forces recaptured Guam and captured Saipan and Tinian in the Mariana Islands between June and August 1944, as part of the Mariana and Palau Islands campaign. These islands were needed to provide bases for USAAF Twentieth Air Force B-29 Superfortress heavy bombers to attack the Japanese home islands. Construction of the large air bases needed to support B-29s began on Saipan in June 1944, before the end of the Battle of Saipan, and work on air fields on Tinian and Guam commenced in July and August respectively. The B-29s of the XXI Bomber Command began to arrive at Saipan starting on October 12, and the 73rd Bombardment Wing began flying warm-up missions against Japanese-held islands in the Pacific on October 27 in preparation for operations against Japan itself.

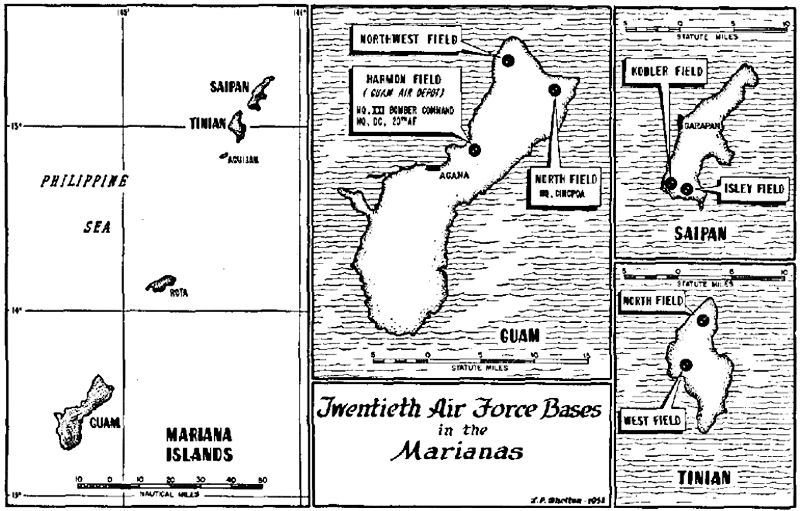
Locations of U.S. 20th Air Force bases in the Marianas Islands, on Guam, Saipan and Tinian, during World War II

The USAAF bases in the Mariana Islands were within range of a number of Japanese air bases in the Pacific. These included Wake Island to the east, Truk and the Gilbert and Marshall Islands to the southeast, Woleai to the south and Yap to the southwest. To the north the Japanese had air bases in the Nampo Shoto chain of islands and Bonin Islands, which included three airstrips on Iwo Jima. Several of the minor islands in the Mariana chain also remained in Japanese hands, and there were airfields on Rota and Pagan. The Japanese were unable to use most of these bases, however, as they had been isolated and heavily damaged by United States air attacks, and the Imperial Japanese Army Air Force (IJAAF) and Imperial Japanese Navy (IJN) had relatively few aircraft and pilots available.

Despite the limited threat of attack, the United States military took steps to protect the B-29 bases in the Mariana Islands. The USAAF's Seventh Air Force played the most important role, and continuously attacked the Japanese-held islands until just before the end of the war. United States Navy (USN) and United States Marine Corps (USMC) aircraft and XXI Bomber Command B-29s also occasionally participated in these attacks. The Seventh Air Force also provided air defence for the Mariana Islands; this task was assigned to the 318th Fighter Group, which was equipped with Republic P-47 Thunderbolt fighters, and the 6th Night Fighter Squadron which flew Northrop P-61 Black Widows. The Thunderbolts were also responsible for suppressing the Japanese-held Mariana Islands, though it proved difficult to stop the 3,600-man garrison from repairing the airfield on Pagan. In addition, the US Army stationed elements of eight anti-aircraft gun battalions and two searchlight battalions on Saipan between July 1944 and February 1945. The head of the USAAF General "Hap" Arnold, who also directly commanded the Twentieth Air Force, was concerned about whether these defenses were sufficient, particularly given the high cost of the Superfortress bombers. Accordingly, he allocated a Microwave Early Warning (MEW) radar to protect the bases on Saipan. This advanced radar was not immediately installed, however, as the local commanders believed that the island's air defenses were adequate.

== Japanese attacks ==
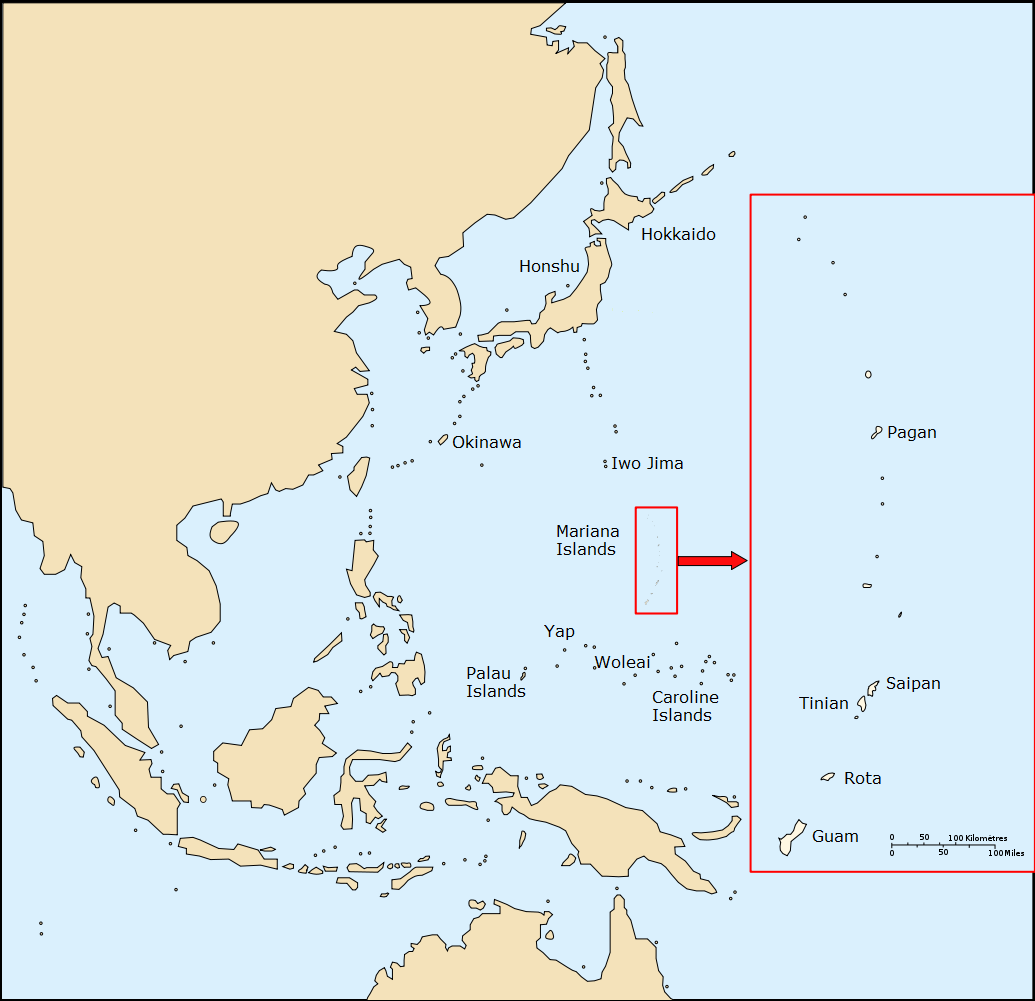
Locations of the Mariana Islands, Iwo Jima and Japan

The first Japanese air attacks on the B-29 bases occurred while they were under construction. Small numbers of Japanese aircraft flying from Guam, Peleliu, Iwo Jima and Truk made occasional raids on the American forces on Saipan during the fighting there, but caused little damage. Between June 24 and July 21 the 6th Night Fighter Squadron intercepted 37 raids on Saipan, and claimed three "kills". These raids typically comprised twelve IJN Mitsubishi G4M bombers (codenamed "Betty" by the Allies), or IJAAF Mitsubishi Ki-67 ("Peggy") bombers operating from bases on mainland Japan and staging through Iwo Jima. The attacks disrupted airbase construction on several days and contributed to delays completing the B-29 base on Saipan, Isley Field. Small numbers of Japanese soldiers who had avoided capture at the end of the battles on the islands also raided the B-29 bases on occasion, mainly in search of food.

The main Japanese air offensive against the Mariana Islands began in early November 1944. On November 1, a B-29 flying from the Marianas overflew the Tokyo region for the first time. The next day, nine or ten IJN G4Ms belonging to the IJN Attack Hikōtai 703 struck Isley Field and the adjacent Kobler Field on Saipan. The raiders arrived over Saipan shortly after 1:30 am and dropped their bombs from low altitude. Only five bombs struck Isley Field, and these caused little damage. A Black Widow from the 6th Night Fighter Squadron shot down one of the G4Ms and another two were lost to other causes. On November 3 the Imperial General Headquarters issued a statement which falsely claimed that Japanese aircraft had bombed and destroyed fifteen locations in Saipan and Tinian. A further attack by either five or ten G4Ms with fighter escorts took place at 1:30 am on November 7, but also caused little damage. The USAAF official history states that three G4Ms were downed in this raid while another source states there were no Japanese losses. (Note: The official history states that the attack on November 7 comprised two raids, each made by five bombers, and that three of these ten bombers were shot down. Sakaida and Takaki write that seven bombers were dispatched of which five reached Saipan and escaped after bombing American facilities there. They do not state that the other two bombers were shot down.) Imperial General Headquarters claimed that 20 B-29s out of 40 located were destroyed in the November 7 raid. These and all subsequent Japanese air attacks on the Marianas were overseen by the Air Training Army.

Further attacks were conducted against Saipan during late November in an attempt to disrupt the American offensive. On November 24, Marianas-based B-29s conducted their first raid against Japan, bombing targets in and around Tokyo. Three days later the Japanese mounted two raids against their bases. During the early hours of November 27, two G4Ms flying from Iwo Jima struck Isley Field from low altitude and escaped after destroying one B-29 and damaging eleven others. This attack came as a surprise to the Americans, and construction lights were still on at Isley at the start of the raid.

Later that day, twelve bomb-equipped Mitsubishi A6M "Zero" fighters from the IJN's 252 Kōkūtai (252 Air Group) accompanied by two Nakajima C6N "Myrt" reconnaissance aircraft for navigation purposes departed Iwo Jima for Saipan. The attackers flew just above sea level to avoid US radar, and one of the A6Ms was forced to divert to Pagan after its propeller struck a wave; this aircraft was shot down by a USAAF Thunderbolt while attempting to land. The remaining eleven A6Ms arrived over Saipan at noon, shortly after XXI Bomber Command's second raid on Tokyo had departed. These aircraft strafed Isley Field destroying three or four B-29s and damaging up to two others. One of the Japanese pilots landed his fighter on Isley Field and fired on airfield personnel with his pistol until he was killed by rifle fire; this incident was witnessed by Brigadier General Haywood S. Hansell, the commander of XXI Bomber Command. (Note: The official history gives USAAF losses from the second attack on November 24 as three B-29s destroyed and two damaged. Tillman states that three B-29s were destroyed and Sakaida and Takaki give a figure of four B-29s destroyed) None of the ten other A6Ms survived; four were shot down by USAAF fighters and six by anti-aircraft guns. The U.S. gunners also downed a USAAF Thunderbolt in circumstances which an official assessment later described as "inexcusable". On the night of November 28/29 six or eight G4Ms from Attack Hikōtai 704 bombed Isley Field from high altitude but caused little damage.

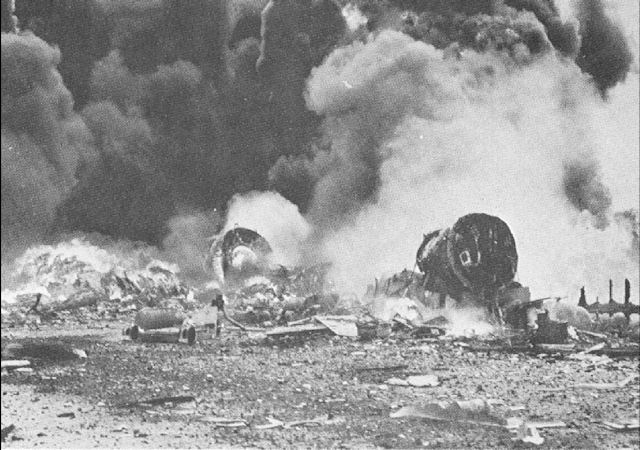
B-29s burning at Isley Field on November 27

The United States military took steps to improve Saipan's defenses after the raids of November 27. Two USN destroyers were stationed 100 miles (160 km) northwest of the island to provide radar warning of further attacks. These ships detected some of the later Japanese raiders, but others managed to arrive undetected. An AN/TPS-3 radar was also flown to Saipan from Hawaii. Arnold became frustrated that the MEW still was not in use, and on December 3 Fleet Admiral Chester W. Nimitz, the commander of the Pacific Ocean Areas, ordered that the highest priority be given to installing the radar. Despite this, it still was not ready until after the conclusion of the Japanese air campaign. Two Consolidated B-24 Liberator bombers fitted with air-to-air radar sets were also dispatched to Saipan. This was the first use of airborne warning and control aircraft by the United States, but they were not used in combat.

Further attacks were mounted in December. On December 7, Japanese aircraft, which included Attack Hikōtai 704 G4Ms and 110th Sentai (Wing) Ki-67s, conducted a simultaneous attack from high and low altitudes which destroyed three B-29s and damaged another 23. Japanese losses were heavy, however, with six out of eight Ki-67s of the 110th Sentai lost during this attack, the first carried out by this unit. The largest attack on Saipan occurred on the night of December 25/26 when 25 Japanese aircraft again attacked from high and low altitudes and destroyed one B-29, damaged three beyond repair and caused minor damage to a further eleven. Also on 26 December, the Air Training Army was redesignated the 6th Air Army but retained the mission of conducting attacks on the Marianas.

The raid on Christmas night was the last major Japanese attack on the Marianas. On January 2, a single Japanese aircraft destroyed one B-29 and damaged another three. A further two small raids were attempted in January and one on February 2, but none of five aircraft dispatched reached the islands and four were shot down. In early February the 6th Air Army's parent headquarters, the General Defense Command (GDC), reached the conclusion that the raiding forces being dispatched against the American bomber bases were too small to be effective. As it was not possible to allocate additional aircraft to bolster these missions, the GDC directed that the offensive cease and that the 6th Air Army be held in reserve to be used against any Allied forces which landed in the Japanese home islands.

Overall, more than 80 Japanese aircraft were dispatched against Saipan and Tinian between November 1944 and the end of the offensive in February 1945. The Japanese destroyed 11 B-29s, caused major damage to eight and minor damage to another 35. American casualties were 45 dead and over 200 wounded. USAAF fighters and anti-aircraft guns shot down about 37 Japanese aircraft during these raids.

== US counterattacks ==
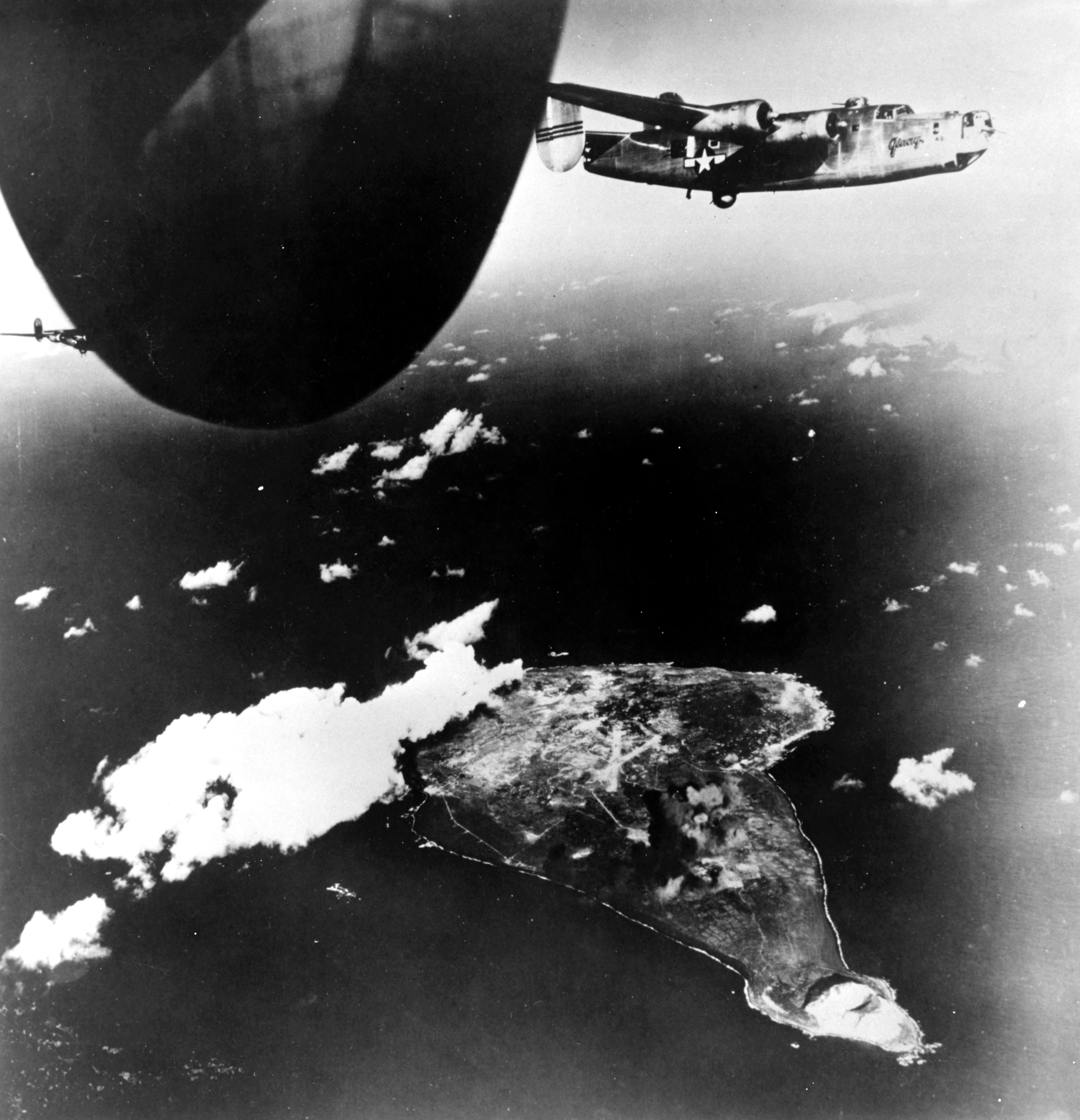
B-24 Liberators fly away from Iwo Jima after bombing the island on December 15, 1944

After the Marianas began to come under attack, the United States military stepped up its raids on the Japanese-held islands which could be used to launch raids on the B-29 bases. Particular attention was given to Iwo Jima, as it was correctly assumed that the Japanese aircraft which attacked the Marianas were flying from Japan and staging through the island en route to their targets. Following the first raid against Saipan in November, XXI Bomber Command B-29s were dispatched against Iwo Jima's airfields on November 5 and 8. These attacks were primarily training missions and caused little damage. The first raid was unopposed by the Japanese, but the second was met by eight fighters which inflicted light damage on a B-29; this was the first combat damage suffered by any of XXI Bomber Command's aircraft. The Seventh Air Force also increased the number of B-24 Liberator attacks on Iwo Jima, and these attacked the island 30 times during November.

Nimitz ordered a major attack on Iwo Jima following the raids of November 27 and dispatched Lieutenant General Millard Harmon, the commander of Army Air Forces in the Pacific Ocean Areas, from Hawaii to Saipan to oversee this operation. Harmon arrived there on December 5 and met with Admiral John H. Hoover and Hansell to discuss his plans for a daylight attack using all available Lockheed P-38 Lightning fighters and B-24 and B-29 bombers in conjunction with a naval bombardment by the heavy cruisers USS Chester, USS Pensacola and USS Salt Lake City of Cruiser Division 5. This operation was scheduled for December 7, but was delayed by a day due to bad weather. The attack began at 9:45 am on December 8 when 24 P-38s attacked the island. The B-29 raid took place at 11:00 am and the B-24s attacked at noon. Due to cloud cover over Iwo Jima the heavy bombers were forced to use radar rather than visual bombing, which limited the effectiveness of these attacks. The operation concluded with a 70-minute bombardment by the three cruisers which began at 1:47 pm. Overall, the USAAF dropped 814 tons of bombs and the cruisers fired 1,500 rounds of 8-inch and 5,334 rounds of 5-inch shells. The damage caused by this attack contributed to the cessation of Japanese raids on the Marianas until December 25.

The bombardment of Iwo Jima continued until the Battle of Iwo Jima on February 19, 1945. The island was attacked at least once each day by the Seventh Air Force's B-24s between December 8, 1944, and February 15, 1945, and several of these aircraft were shot down. Cruiser Division 5 also conducted naval bombardments on December 24 and 27 as well as January 5 and 24. In the last of these attacks the heavy cruisers were joined by the battleship USS Indiana. US aircraft also mounted small-scale night attacks to disrupt Japanese repair efforts. In addition, the USAAF continued to attack the other Pacific islands within range of the Marianas until July 1945. While the attacks on Iwo Jima damaged the island's airfields, the Japanese managed to keep at least one of them operational at all times, and none were closed for more than a single day. The need to repair damage to the airfields forced the Japanese garrison on Iwo Jima to divert labor from building defensive positions, however. The combination of heavy losses over Saipan and damage to the airfields on Iwo Jima caused the Japanese to break off their attacks against the Marianas on 2 January. Few Japanese aircraft visited Iwo Jima starting in January, and due to their losses in the Philippines Campaign, the IJAAF and IJN lacked the long-ranged aircraft needed to resume attacks on the Marianas in early 1945.

== Operation Tsurugi ==
In December 1944, the Japanese Army's 1st Raiding Regiment, an elite commando formation, was ordered to attack the B-29 bases at Saipan. A 136-man force designated the Giretsu Airborne Unit was formed for this suicide mission, which called for the destruction with explosive charges of B-29s by troops carried by Mitsubishi Ki-21 "Sally" bombers. These aircraft lacked the range to reach Saipan directly from Japan, and it was planned that they would refuel at Iwo Jima. The commandos undertook intensive training at Saitama Kanto and the raid was scheduled to take place on January 17, 1945, but was canceled after damage to the airfields at Iwo Jima. The Giretsu Airborne Unit instead attacked a U.S. airbase at Okinawa on 24 May, destroying nine aircraft and damaging another 29.

Following the perceived success of the raid on Okinawa the IJN developed plans for a force of naval commandos to attack airfields in the Marianas. On June 24, it issued orders for a raid involving 30 Yokosuka P1Y "Frances" bombers and 20 G4Ms carrying naval commandos. The plan, Operation Tsurugi, called for the P1Ys to strafe the airfields before the G4Ms crash-landed on them. The commandos would then destroy as many B-29s as possible before fighting to the death. The commandos and G4Ms selected to land in the Marianas conducted intensive training at bases in northern Honshu and the operation was scheduled for late July. USN carrier raids on this area on July 14 and 15 destroyed many of the force's aircraft, however, and the operation was postponed until August.

Following its postponement the scale of Operation Tsurugi was expanded to include 60 G4Ms carrying 300 naval commandos from the 101st Kure Special Naval Landing Force and 300 Army commandos from the 1st Raiding Regiment. It was planned that 20 G4Ms would carry naval commandos to Guam, another 20 would carry army commandos to Saipan and the remaining 20 would transport a joint Army–Navy force to Tinian. The revised plan also called for a B-29 to be captured and flown back to Japan. This attack was scheduled to take place between August 19 and 23. Allied intelligence became aware of Operation Tsurugi, however, and another carrier attack on Honshu destroyed 29 G4Ms and 20 P1Ys on August 9. While the operation was not called off after this raid, it did not go ahead after the Japanese surrender on 15 August. The Japanese military also developed a plan to attack Saipan using Mitsubishi Ki-167 suicide aircraft during August, but nothing came of this.

== Aftermath ==
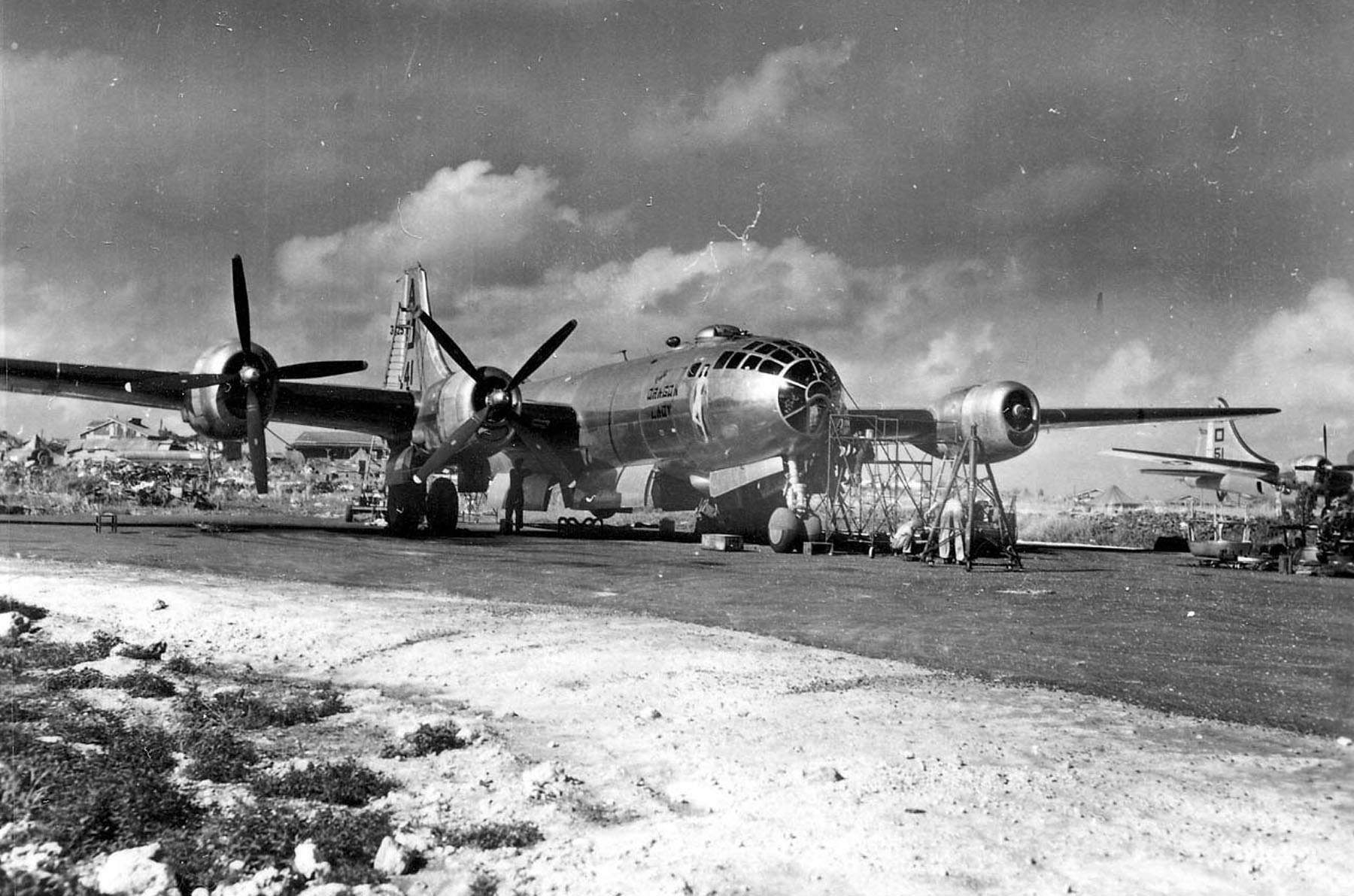
A B-29 undergoing maintenance on Saipan

The Japanese attacks on the Mariana Islands during 1944 and 1945 did not seriously disrupt the USAAF's strategic air campaign against Japan. They did, however, force the United States to allocate forces to defend the islands in order to prevent further losses of expensive B-29s. Moreover, due to the high cost of the heavy bombers, the ratio of losses was in favor of the Japanese.

When the U.S. military was considering future operations in the Bonin Islands during August 1944 the planners assessed that an occupation of Iwo Jima might be necessary to protect the Marianas from attack, and after the war this was given as one of the justifications for the costly invasion of the island. However, this was not necessary due to the success of the Seventh Air Force and the USN's campaign against Iwo Jima's airfields as well as the Japanese military's shortage of long-ranged aircraft. In any event, the decision to invade Iwo Jima was made a month before the major attacks on the B-29 bases began, and there were no raids on the Marianas in the seven weeks before the landings began on February 19.

== Notes ==
Footnotes

Citations
