= Japanese destroyer Shigure (1935) =

Destroyer of the Imperial Japanese Navy

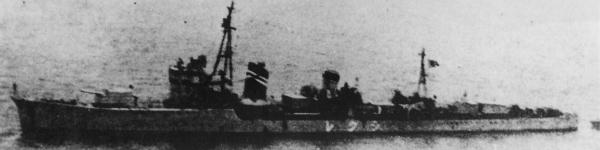
- Shigure photographed from a seaplane in July of 1939

History

Empire of Japan
- Name: Shigure
- Ordered: 1931 FY
- Builder: Uraga Dock Company
- Laid down: 9 December 1933
- Launched: 18 May 1935
- Commissioned: 7 September 1936
- Stricken: 10 March 1945
- Fate: Torpedoed and sunk, 24 January 1945

General characteristics
- Class & type: Shiratsuyu-class destroyer
- Displacement: 1,685 long tons (1,712 t)
- Length: 103.5 m (340 ft) pp; 107.5 m (352 ft 8 in) waterline
- Beam: 9.9 m (32 ft 6 in)
- Draft: 3.5 m (11 ft 6 in)
- Propulsion: 2 shaft Kampon geared turbines; 3 boilers, 42,000 hp (31,000 kW)
- Speed: 34 knots (39 mph; 63 km/h)
- Range: 4,000 nautical miles (7,400 km) at 18 knots (21 mph; 33 km/h)
- Complement: 226
- Armament: 5 × 12.7 cm/50 Type 3 naval guns (2×2, 1×1); 2 × 13.2 mm (0.52 in) AA guns; 8 × 24 in (610 mm) torpedo tubes; 16 × depth charges

Service record
- Operations: Battle of Shanghai; Battle of Wuhan; Battle of the Coral Sea; Battle of Midway; First Naval Battle of Guadalcanal; Battle of Vella Gulf; Battle off Horaniu; Battle of Vella Lavella; Battle of Empress Augusta Bay; Battle of the Philippine Sea; Battle of Leyte Gulf; Battle of Surigao Strait
- Victories: USS Growler (1942)

Shigure (時雨, ”Drizzle”) was the second of ten Shiratsuyu-class destroyers, and the first to be built for the Imperial Japanese Navy under the Circle One Program (Maru Ichi Keikaku). Along with the destroyer Yukikaze, she developed a reputation within the Imperial Japanese Navy for being "lucky" or "unsinkable", emerging undamaged from several battles and as the sole surviving Japanese warship from two. As the flagship of Captain Tameichi Hara's Destroyer Division 27 Shigure received a prominent place in the memoirs of the only Japanese destroyer captain to survive the entire Pacific War and write about his experiences. Shigure was torpedoed and sunk by the submarine USS Blackfin in the Gulf of Siam on 24 January 1945.

== Construction and initial career ==
The Shiratsuyu-class destroyers were modified versions of the Hatsuharu class, and were designed to accompany the Japanese main striking force and to conduct both day and night torpedo attacks against the United States Navy as it advanced across the Pacific Ocean, according to Japanese naval strategic projections. Despite being one of the most powerful classes of destroyers in the world at the time of their completion, none survived the Pacific War.

Shigure, built at the Uraga Dock Company, was laid down on 9 December 1933, launched on 18 May 1935 and commissioned on 7 September 1936. Upon commissioning, Shigure was appointed as flagship of destroyer division 9, consisting of Shigure, Shiratsuyu, Ariake, and Yūgure. Until the end of 1936, Shigure served as an escort ship for the battleship Hiei, the favorite ship of Emperor Hirohito, escorting Hiei on several voyages and taking part in a fleet review off Kobe on 29 October, before escorting Hiei back to Yokosuka. With the start of 1937, Shigure and the rest of destroyer division 9 were detached from Hiei, where they embarked on a series of peace time patrols and training duty.

In July 1937, the Second Sino-Japanese War broke out, prompting Shigure and her destroyers to assist the war effort. On 10 August, Shigure arrived at the battle of Shanghai and immediately saw use conducting shore bombardment to cover the invading Japanese troops from Chinese counterattack. On the 18th, Shigure and her destroyers were attacked by Chinese shore batteries but managed to withdraw without damage. For the rest of the month, Shigure ferried troops to landing points in China before she withdrew to Japan and took Shiratsuyu, Ariake, and Yūgure with her, ending their involvement in the Sino-Japanese war until an entire year later when Shigure assisted the battle of Wuhan, but only with local patrol duty off the Chinese coast. The only action came on 5 August 1938 when Shigure, Shiratsuyu, Ariake and the gunboat Futami conducted shore bombardment on attacking ground troops while operating in the Yangtze River.

On 1 December 1938, after a series of reforms to the compositions of Japanese destroyer squadrons, destroyer division 9 was renamed to destroyer division 27, although it remained unchanged otherwise with Shigure continuing as flagship. A series of patrol and training duties ensued until the start of 1941 when Shigure served in a blockade with the intent to persuade a ceasefire in relation to the Franco Thai war.

== World War II ==
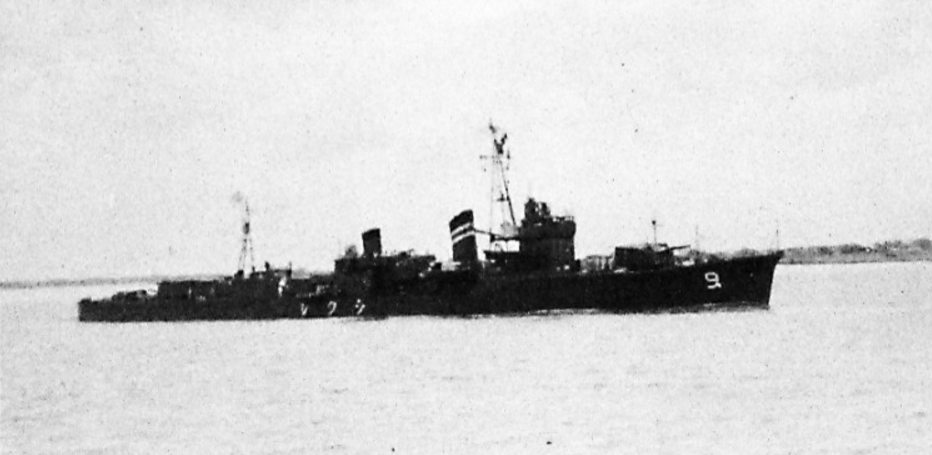
Shigure anchored off China during battle of Shanghai, 15 August 1937

At the time of the attack on Pearl Harbor, Shigure was assigned to Destroyer Division 27 of Destroyer Squadron 1 of the IJN 1st Fleet on anti-submarine warfare patrols in Japanese home waters and to assist in guarding Japan’s main battle fleet. In early 1942, Shigure was assigned to convoy escort duties, escorting the aircraft carrier Zuihō to Davao, and the carriers Shōkaku, and Zuikaku to Truk. At the Battle of the Coral Sea on 7 May, Shigure was part of the escort for Admiral Takeo Takagi’s Strike Force and at the Battle of Midway on 4–6 June, she was part of the Aleutians Guard Force under Admiral Shirō Takasu. Shigure was reassigned to the IJN 2nd Fleet on 14 July after the Midway Operation was cancelled. In mid-August, Shigure escorted the fleet to Truk, and was then assigned to cover a troop transport run to reoccupy Makin Atoll after the Makin Raid. Based out of Jaluit in September, Shigure helped secure Abemama in the Gilbert Islands and Ndeni in the Santa Cruz Islands, before escorting a troop convoy from Palau to Rabaul on 24 September. In October and November, she made eight "Tokyo Express" troop transport runs to Guadalcanal. In the First Naval Battle of Guadalcanal on the night of 12–13 November 1942 she was part of the distant screening force and saw no combat, but later rescued survivors of the battleship Hiei. At the end of the year, she escorted the aircraft carrier Chūyō from Truk to Yokosuka and back to Truk.

In mid-January 1943, Shigure escorted a troop convoy from Truk to Shortlands and was later assigned to "Operation KE", to cover troop evacuations from Guadalcanal. She returned to Sasebo in mid-February for repairs. Shigure returned to Truk in mid-March, escorting Chūyō and Taiyō from Truk to Yokosuka in mid-April and returning with Chūyō and Unyō at the end of the month. In mid-May, she escorted the battleship Musashi from Truk to Yokosuka, returning to Truk by 21 June. In July, she was assigned to accompany the cruiser Nagara on various assignments around the Solomon Islands and was reassigned to the IJN 2nd Fleet on 20 July. She made a "Tokyo Express" troop transport run to Rekata Bay on 27 July, and to Kolombangara on 1 August.

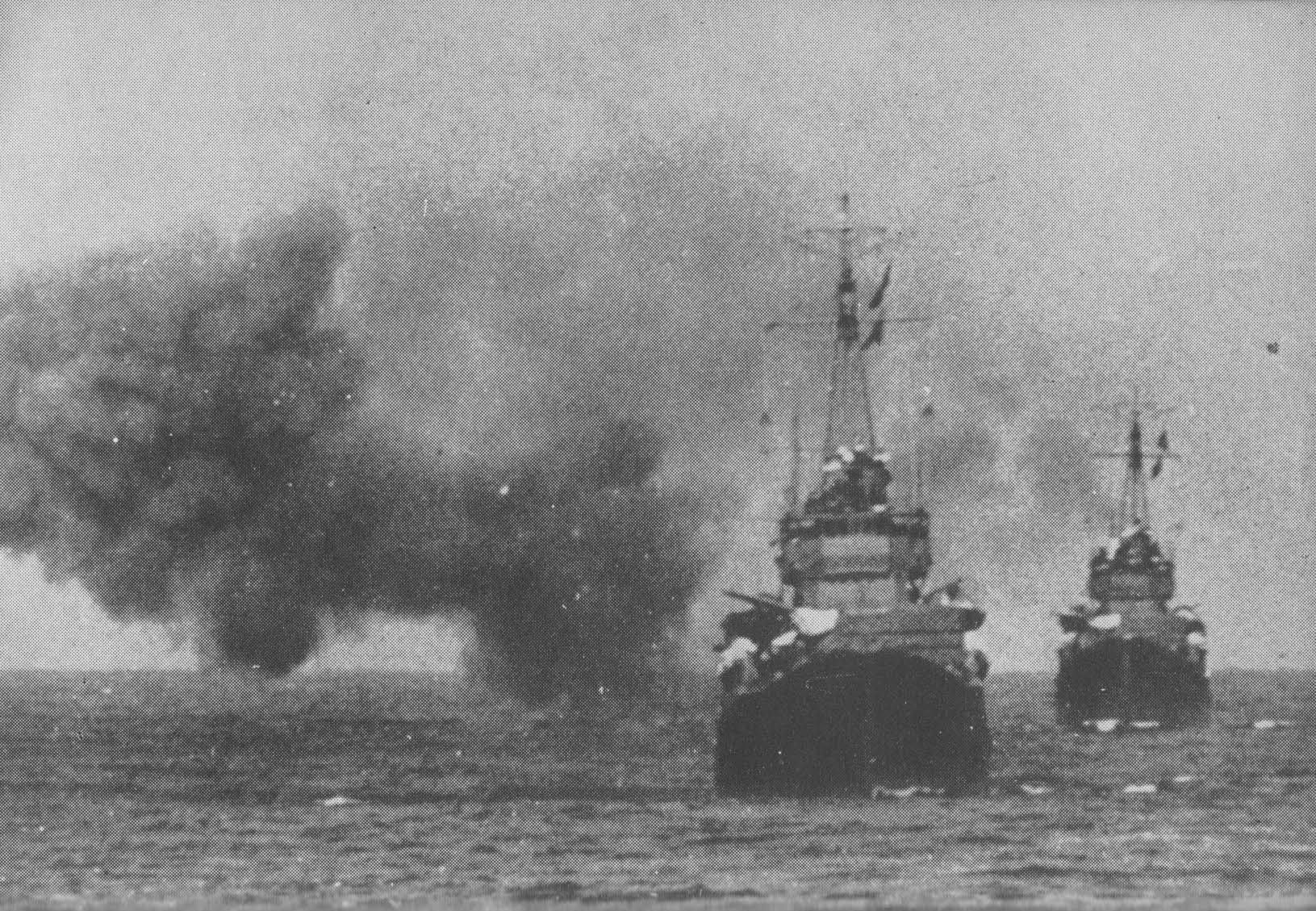
Shigure and Samidare bombarding allied positions off Bougainville in the Solomon Islands hours prior to the Naval Battle of Vella Lavella on 7 October 1943.

During the Battle of Vella Gulf of 6–7 August, Shigure was the only one of four Japanese destroyers to escape, though she was later found to have been hit by a torpedo that failed to explode. During the Battle off Horaniu on 17–18 August, she again engaged United States Navy destroyers without damage while covering a troop transport mission to Vella Lavella. At the end of August, she made two troop evacuation runs to Rekata Bay, one of which was aborted, and one mission to Tuluvu and to Buka, Papua New Guinea in September. She further covered two troop evacuation missions to Kolombangara at the end of September and early October. She was covering troop evacuations at Vella Lavella during the 6–7 October Battle of Vella Lavella, and contributed to massive damage to the destroyer USS Selfridge. For the remainder of October, she participated in four more transport runs to points in New Guinea. At the Battle of Empress Augusta Bay on 2 November, she engaged an American cruiser-destroyer formation, but without damage. After making a final troop transport mission to Buka on 6 November, she escorted a convoy from Rabaul to Truk, rescuing 70 survivors of the transport Tokyo Maru en route on 10 November. She returned to Sasebo in mid-November for repairs. Departing Sasebo on 24 December, she collided with a fishing boat in Bungo Strait, and was forced to return again to Sasebo for further repairs.

In January 1944, Shigure escorted the food supply ship Irako from Yokosuka to Truk, and in early February escorted tanker convoys from Truk to Tarakan and Balikpapan. She suffered heavy damage in an air raid on Truk by United States Navy aircraft, taking a direct bomb hit to her No.2 gun turret, killing 21 crewmen and wounding 45 others. She was withdrawn to Palau for emergency repairs, and returned to Sasebo on 22 March, where her damaged turret was removed and replaced by two triple Type 96 anti-aircraft gun mounts. Repairs completed by 11 May, she escorted Musashi and aircraft carriers Chitose, Chiyoda, Zuihō to Tawitawi, and from there to Davao. In June she was assigned to “Operation KON”, (the reinforcement of Biak), in response to American landings. She rescued 110 survivors from the destroyer Harusame on 8 June, and then engaged in combat against a group of Allied cruisers and destroyers, taking two shell hits, which killed seven crewmen and wounded 15 others. From 19–20 June, Shigure was at the Battle of the Philippine Sea as part of Admiral Takatsugu Jōjima’s “Force B”, and assisted in the rescue of survivors from the aircraft carrier Hiyō. In July, she was assigned to escort a troop convoy from Kure to Okinawa, and in August accompanied the cruiser Kinu on a transport mission from Singapore to Brunei, Manila and Palau, returning via Cebu. In October, Shigure sortied from Lingga and Brunei and was at the Battle of Leyte Gulf on 22–25 October. She took minor damage from a direct bomb hit to her forward gun turret on 24 October, killing five crewmen and wounding six. She took further damage in the Battle of Surigao Strait in which a direct shell hit and several near misses took out her radio, compass, and steering, but she was the only ship of the “Southern Force” to survive the battle, and limped back to Brunei on 27 October. Shigure returned to Sasebo for repairs in November, helping to sink the submarine USS Growler off Mindoro on 8 November en route. She was reassigned to the IJN 5th Fleet on 15 November and the IJN 2nd Fleet on 20 November, departing Kure on 17 December with the aircraft carrier Unryū for Manila. After Unryū was sunk by the submarine USS Redfish, Shigure and the destroyer Momi rescued the 146 survivors. Instead of continuing with the mission, Shigure set course for Sasebo, and in doing so, became the only ship of this force to return (Momi and the destroyer Hinoki the other escort in the force, continued with the mission and were subsequently sunk with all hands lost within a few hours of each other.)

On 24 January 1945, while escorting a convoy from Hong Kong to Singapore, Shigure was torpedoed and sunk by the submarine USS Blackfin in the Gulf of Siam, approximately 160 miles (260 km) east of Kota Bharu, Malaya at position (06°00′N 103°48′E). She sank slowly, allowing for 270 survivors to escape, with 37 crewmen lost. The survivors were rescued by the escort ships Kanju and Miyake. Shigure was removed from the navy list on 10 March 1945.
