= Japanese destroyer Ariake (1934) =

Hatsuharu-class destroyer

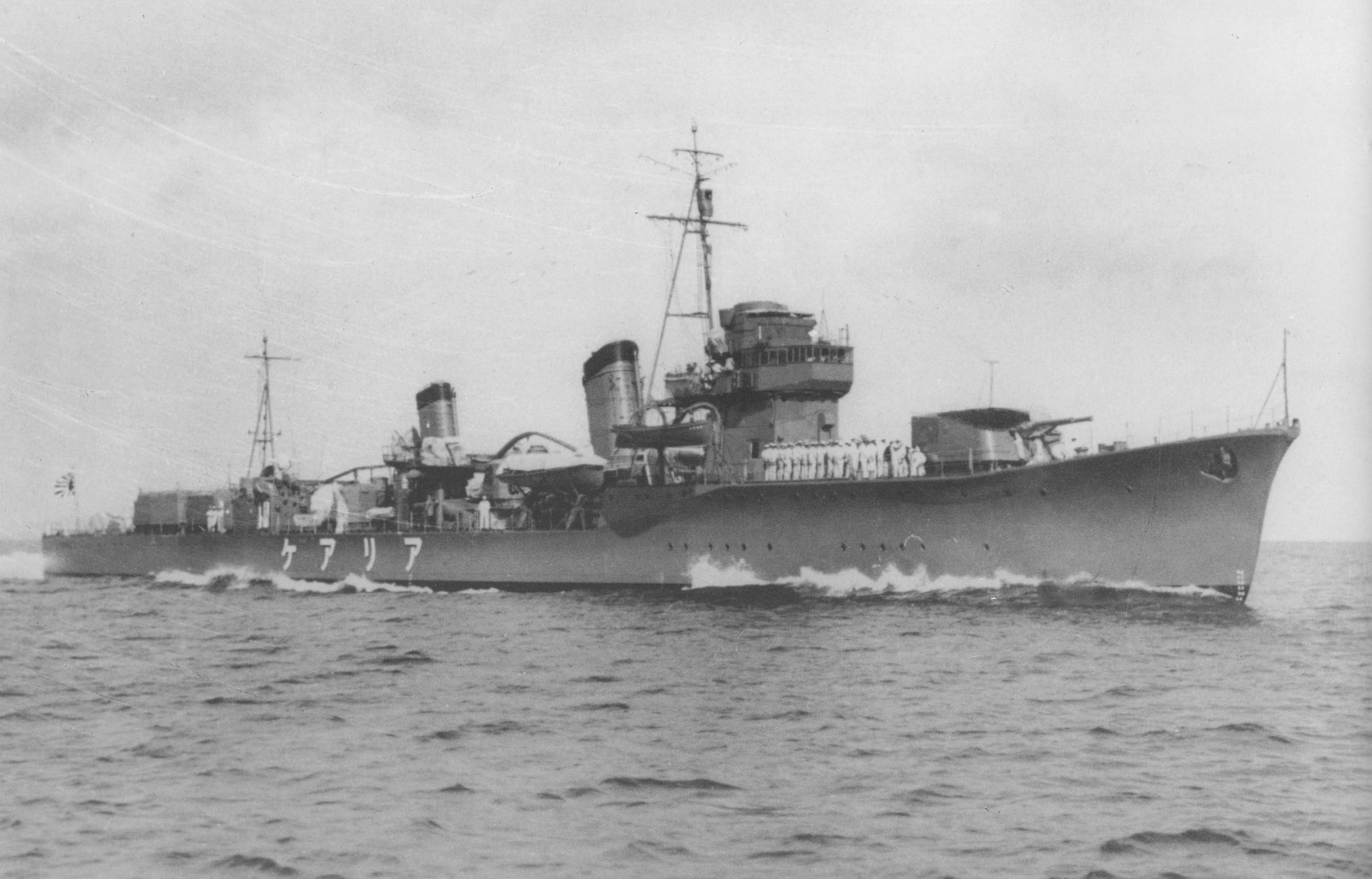
- Ariake underway on 25 March 1935.

History

Empire of Japan
- Name: Ariake
- Ordered: FY 1933
- Builder: Kawasaki Shipyards
- Laid down: 14 January 1933
- Launched: 23 September 1934
- Commissioned: 25 March 1935
- Stricken: 15 October 1943
- Fate: Sunk in action, 28 July 1943

General characteristics
- Class & type: Hatsuharu-class destroyer
- Displacement: 1,530 t (1,510 long tons)
- Length: 103.5 m (340 ft) pp, 105.5 m (346 ft) waterline; 109.5 m (359 ft) overall
- Beam: 10 m (32 ft 10 in)
- Draught: 3.38 m (11 ft 1 in)
- Propulsion: 2 shaft Kampon geared turbines; 3 boilers, 42,000 hp (31,000 kW)
- Speed: 36 knots (41 mph; 67 km/h)
- Range: 4,000 nmi (7,400 km) at 14 kn (26 km/h)
- Complement: 212
- Armament: (as built) 2 × 2, 1 × 1 – 12.7 cm/50 Type 3 naval gun; 2 × 1 – 40 mm AA guns; 3 × 3 – 61 cm (24 in) torpedo tubes; 18 × depth charges

Ariake (有明, ”Dawn” (in reference to the 16th day of the lunar month onward)) was the fifth of six Hatsuharu-class destroyers, built for the Imperial Japanese Navy under the Circle One Program (Maru Ichi Keikaku). Three were laid down in JFY 1931 and the next three in JFY 1933.

== History ==
Construction of the advanced Hatsuharu-class destroyers was intended to give the Imperial Japanese Navy smaller and more economical destroyers than the previous Fubuki and Akatsuki-class destroyers, but with essentially the same weaponry. These conflicting goals proved beyond contemporary destroyer design, and the initial ships of this class were top-heavy, with severe stability problems and inherent structural weaknesses. After the "Tomozuru Incident" of 1934 and "IJN 4th Fleet Incident" in 1935, Ariake underwent extensive design changes and modifications prior to launch to remedy these issues.

Ariake was laid down at Kawasaki Shipyards in Kobe on 14 January 1933, launched on 23 September 1934 and commissioned on 25 March 1935.

== Operational history ==
At the time of the attack on Pearl Harbor, Ariake was assigned to Destroyer Division 27 of Destroyer Squadron 1 of the IJN 1st Fleet together with her sister ships Shiratsuyu, Shigure, and Yūgure, and was based at Hashirajima in Japanese home waters on anti-submarine patrol.

In January 1942, Ariake escorted aircraft carriers Hiryū and Sōryū to Palau and to Ambon during the invasion of the Netherlands East Indies, and was a participant in the Darwin air raid of 19 February 1942. Afterward, she was based at Staring Bay, in Sulawesi from which she conducted escort patrol missions to the end of March. She returned to Sasebo Naval Arsenal for repairs from 22 March to 15 April 1942. At the end of April, she went to Truk as part of the escort for the carriers Shōkaku and Zuikaku and was part of Admiral Takeo Takagi's force at the Battle of the Coral Sea. In May, she was reassigned to escort the cruisers Myōkō and Haguro back to Kure.

During the Battle of Midway, she was part of the escort for the Aleutian diversionary force under Admiral Shirō Takasu. Reassigned to the IJN 2nd Fleet on 14 July, she was then detached for temporary duty with the IJN 4th Fleet in a sortie from Truk to Jaluit on 20 August. After bombarding Nauru on 23 August, a landing party from Ariake occupied that island as part of "Operation RY" on 26 August until relieved by a garrison force on 30 August. Ariake was then assigned to the Solomon Islands, participating in a troop transport run to land the Ichiki and Aoba Detachments on Guadalcanal, and shelling Henderson Field. From September through December 1942, she was assigned to numerous Tokyo Express high-speed transport runs throughout the Solomon Islands. On 17 December, she attacked and claimed sinking an unidentified submarine, but the report remains unconfirmed. At the end of December, she suffered significant damage near Rabaul in an air raid by USAAF B-24 bombers while towing the damaged destroyer Uzuki. Six near misses killed 28 crewmen and injured 40 others, disabling her No.2 and No.3 gun turrets.

After returning to Sasebo for major repairs through the middle of February 1943, Ariake escorted a convoy to Truk and the end of February and another convoy from Truk to Rabaul and back to Yokosuka at the end of April. She returned to Truk at the end of the month as escort for the aircraft carrier Unyō, returning with the battleship Musashi at the end of May. In early June, she was docked for repairs, except for a sortie to escort the carrier Hiyō to Truk, and to return with the same damaged ship a few days later. In late June, she escorted the aircraft carrier Ryūhō from Yokosuka to Truk, and the cruisers Kumano and Suzuya from Truk to Rabaul, repeating the mission twice in early July.

On 27–28 July 1943, Ariake was on a troop transport run to Tuluvu, New Britain. After grounding on a reef near Cape Gloucester (05°27′S 148°25′E) with the destroyer Mikazuki, Ariake was able to work free. She removed troops and ComDesDiv 30 (Captain Orita Tsuneo) from Mikazuki and completed the mission to Tuluvu, then returned to assist Mikazuki, where she was sunk by USAAF B-25 Mitchells. Seven men were killed, along with Ariake's captain, LtCdr Akifumi Kawahashi.
