= Japanese destroyer Yūgure (1934) =

Hatsuharu-class destroyer

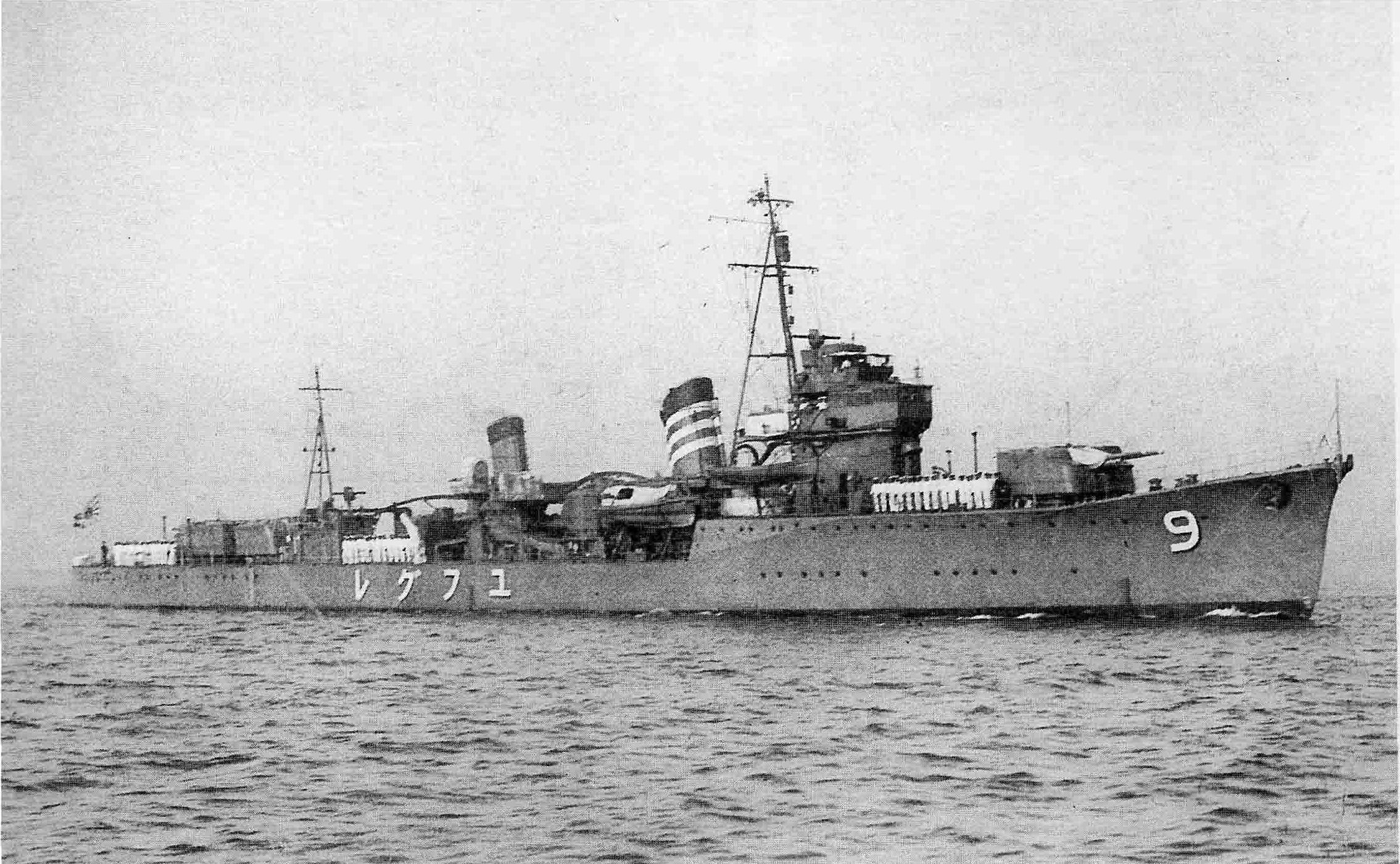
- Hatsuharu-class destroyer Yūgure

History

Empire of Japan
- Name: Yūgure
- Ordered: FY 1933
- Builder: Maizuru Naval Arsenal
- Laid down: 9 April 1933
- Launched: 6 May 1934
- Commissioned: 30 March 1935
- Stricken: 15 October 1943
- Fate: Sunk in action, 20 July 1943

General characteristics
- Class & type: Hatsuharu-class destroyer
- Displacement: 1,530 t (1,510 long tons)
- Length: 103.5 m (340 ft) pp, 105.5 m (346 ft) waterline; 109.5 m (359 ft) overall
- Beam: 10 m (32 ft 10 in)
- Draught: 3.38 m (11 ft 1 in)
- Propulsion: 2 shaft Kampon geared turbines; 3 boilers, 42,000 hp (31,000 kW)
- Speed: 36 knots (41 mph; 67 km/h)
- Range: 4,000 nmi (7,400 km) at 14 kn (26 km/h)
- Complement: 212
- Armament: (as built) 2 × 2, 1 × 1 - 12.7 cm/50 Type 3 naval gun; 2 × 1 - 40 mm AA guns; 3 × 3 - 61 cm (24 in) torpedo tubes; 18 × depth charges

Yūgure (夕暮, ”Twilight”) was the sixth and last Hatsuharu-class destroyer, built for the Imperial Japanese Navy under the Circle One Program (Maru Ichi Keikaku). Three were laid down in JFY 1931 and the next three in JFY 1933.

== History ==
Construction of the advanced Hatsuharu-class destroyers was intended to give the Imperial Japanese Navy smaller and more economical destroyers than the previous Fubuki and Akatsuki-class destroyers, but with essentially the same weaponry. These conflicting goals proved beyond contemporary destroyer design, and the initial ships of this class were top-heavy design, with severe stability problems and with inherent structural weaknesses. After the "Tomozuru Incident" of 1934 and "IJN 4th Fleet Incident" in 1935, Yūgure underwent extensive design changes and modifications prior to launch to remedy these issues.

Yūgure was laid down at Maizuru Naval Arsenal in Maizuru, Kyoto on 9 April 1933, launched on 6 May 1934 and commissioned on 30 March 1935.

== Operational history ==
At the time of the attack on Pearl Harbor, Yūgure was assigned to Destroyer Division 27 of Destroyer Squadron 1 of the IJN 1st Fleet together with her sister ships Shiratsuyu, Shigure, and Ariake, and was based at Hashirajima in Japanese home waters on anti-submarine patrol.

In January 1942, Yūgure escorted aircraft carriers Hiryū and Sōryū to Palau and to Ambon during the invasion of the Netherlands East Indies, and was a participant in the Darwin air raid of 19 February 1942. Afterwards, she was based at Staring Bay, in Sulawesi from which she conducted escort patrol missions to the end of March. She returned to Sasebo Naval Arsenal for repairs from 22 March to 15 April 1942. At the end of April, she went to Truk as part of the escort for the aircraft carriers Shōkaku and Zuikaku and was part of Admiral Takagi's force at the Battle of the Coral Sea.

In May, Yūgure was assigned escort the cruisers Myōkō and Haguro back to Kure. During the Battle of Midway, she was part of the escort for the Aleutian diversionary force under Admiral Shirō Takasu. Reassigned to the IJN 2nd Fleet on 14 July, she was then detached for temporary duty with the IJN 4th Fleet in a sortie from Truk to Jaluit on 20 August. After bombarding Ocean Island on 23 August, a landing party from Yūgure occupied that island on 26 August as part of "Operation RY" until relieved by a garrison force on 30 August. Yūgure was then assigned to the Solomon Islands, participating in numerous Tokyo Express high speed transport runs throughout the Solomon Islands through January 1943. Although she did not participate in the First Naval Battle of Guadalcanal, she assisted in rescue operations afterwards, taking on crew from the stricken battleship Hiei.

After returning to Sasebo for repairs through the middle of January 1943, Yūgure escorted a convoy to Qingdao, and from there to Palau and Wewak by the end of February. She escorted another convoy from Truk to Wewak and back to Yokosuka in March and again in May. She returned to Truk at the end of the month as escort for the carrier Unyō, returning with the battleship Musashi at the end of May. In early June, she escorted the aircraft carrier Hiyō to Truk, and returned with the same damaged ship a few days later. In late June, she escorted the carrier Ryūhō from Yokosuka to Truk. In early June, she was assigned to cover troop transport runs to Kolombangara.

On 12 July 1943, Yūgure participated in the Battle of Kolombangara, assisting in sinking the American destroyer USS Gwin and damaging the cruisers USS Honolulu, USS St. Louis and New Zealand's HMNZS Leander.

However, a few days later on the night of 20 July 1943, while on a troop transport run to Kolombangara, Yūgure was bombed and sunk by U.S. Marine Grumman TBF Avengers from Guadalcanal, north-northwest of Kolombangara (07°25′S 156°45′E). The rescue destroyer Kiyonami picked up about twenty survivors but was sunk in turn soon thereafter, leaving no survivors from Yūgure's crew of 228 men, and only one survivor from Kiyonami herself.
