= Japanese destroyer Samidare (1935) =

Destroyer of the Imperial Japanese Navy

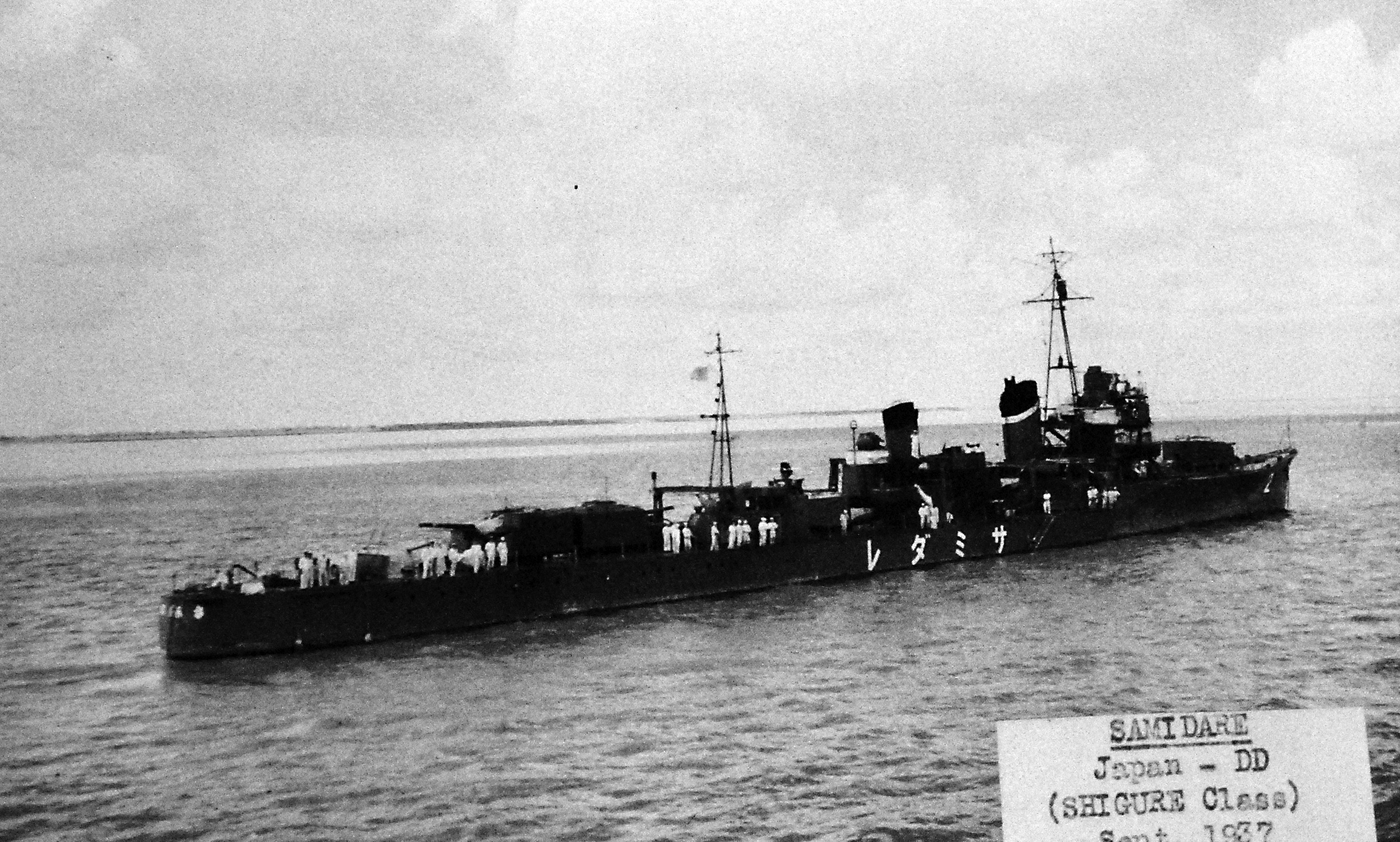

History

Empire of Japan
- Name: Samidare
- Ordered: FY 1931
- Builder: Uraga Dock Company
- Laid down: 19 December 1934
- Launched: 6 July 1935
- Commissioned: 19 January 1937
- Stricken: 10 October 1944
- Fate: Torpedoed and sunk by USS Batfish, 26 August 1944

General characteristics
- Class & type: Shiratsuyu-class destroyer
- Displacement: 1,685 long tons (1,712 t)
- Length: 103.5 m (340 ft) pp; 107.5 m (352 ft 8 in) waterline
- Beam: 9.9 m (32 ft 6 in)
- Draft: 3.5 m (11 ft 6 in)
- Propulsion: 2 shaft Kampon geared turbines; 3 boilers, 42,000 hp (31,000 kW)
- Speed: 34 knots (39 mph; 63 km/h)
- Range: 4,000 nmi (7,400 km) at 18 kn (33 km/h)
- Complement: 226
- Armament: 5 × 12.7 cm/50 Type 3 naval guns (2×2, 1×1); 2 × Type 93 13 mm AA guns; 8 × 24 in (610 mm) torpedo tubes; 16 × Depth charges

Service record
- Operations: Battle of Tarakan (1942); Battle of the Java Sea (1942); Battle of Midway (1942); Battle of the Eastern Solomons (1942); Battle of the Santa Cruz Islands (1942); Naval Battle of Guadalcanal (1942); Battle of Vella Lavella (1943); Battle of Empress Augusta Bay (1943); Battle of the Philippine Sea (1944)
- Victories: USS Monssen (1941); USS Walke (1940)

Samidare (五月雨, "Early Summer Rain") was the fifth of ten Shiratsuyu-class destroyers, built for the Imperial Japanese Navy under the Circle One Program (Maru Ichi Keikaku).

== History ==
The Shiratsuyu-class destroyers were modified versions of the Hatsuharu class, and were designed to accompany the Japanese main striking force and to conduct both day and night torpedo attacks against the United States Navy as it advanced across the Pacific Ocean, according to Japanese naval strategic projections. Despite being one of the most powerful classes of destroyers in the world at the time of their completion, none survived the Pacific War. Samidare, built at the Uraga Dock Company, was laid down on 19 December 1934, launched on 6 July 1935 and commissioned on 19 January 1937.

== Operational history ==
By 1941, Samidare was assigned to the 2nd destroyer division (Murasame, Harusame, Yūdachi, Samidare), part of the overall destroyer squadron 4, under the leadership of commander Matsubara Takisaburo, In late November 1941, Samidare steamed with destroyer squadron 4 to Mako in preparation for Operation M (the invasion of the Philippines). With the start of WW2 for Japan on 7 December 1941, Samidare escorted Philippine invasion convoys to Vigan, then escorted the Lingayen invasion force. With the start of January 1942 Samidare escorted the Tarakan invasion force. However, Samidare tasted her first lick of action while escorting the Balikpapan invasion force to support the landings on the Dutch East Indies from the 23rd to 25th, only for allied air attacks to desperately attempt to halt the convoy. Three troop ships were sunk, but the invasion fleet otherwise continued on and landed their troops. A follow up attack by American destroyers sank two more troop ships but similarly failed to halt the overall convoy.

Samidare spent a break from service throughout most of February, only leaving port again on the 26th with the Java Sea invasion fleet. However, while underway a floatplane from the heavy cruiser Nachi located an ABDA fleet force of two heavy cruisers, three light cruisers and nine destroyers, prompting the troop convoy's escorts to sail for an interception. In the afternoon of the 27th, the opening stages of the battle of the Java Sea commenced as the two fleets engaged at long range; Samidare served in a flotilla of six destroyers led by the light cruiser Naka, which early into the battle fired a spread of 43 torpedoes at the allied fleet at a distance of 15,000 yards. Understandably, none hit their mark. Instead, the heavy cruisers Haguro and Nachi primally carried the battle to a crushing Japanese victory as Samidare retreated to continue escorting the troop convoys.

Returning to Subic Bay in the Philippines on 16 March, Samidare assisted in the blockade of Manila Bay and the invasion of Cebu, returning to Yokosuka for repairs in early May. During the Battle of Midway on 4–6 June, Samidare was part of the Midway Occupation Force under Admiral Nobutake Kondō.

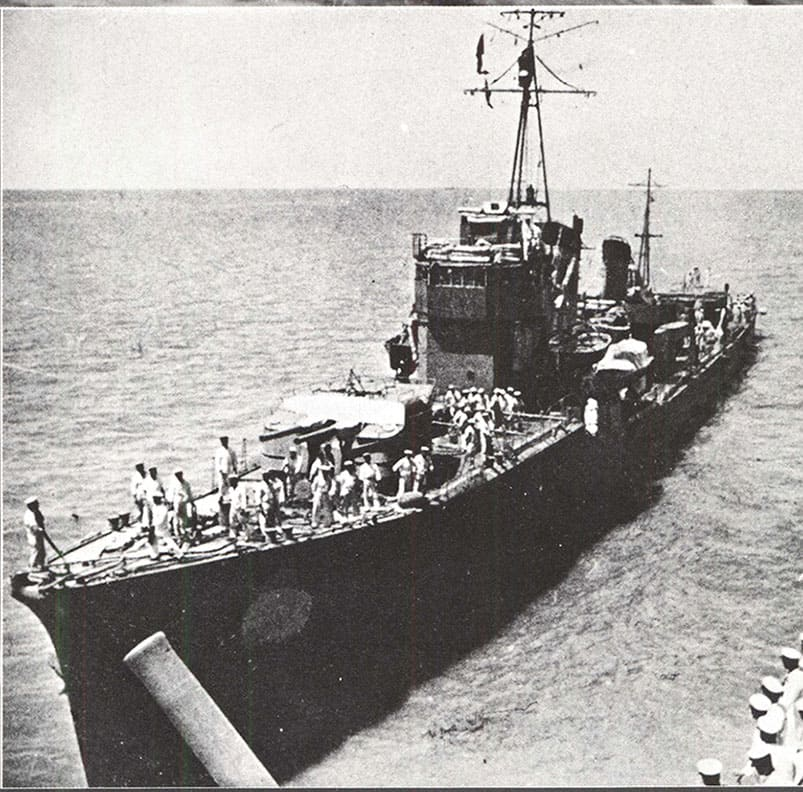
Samidare photographed in 1937

From mid-June, Samidare deployed from Kure via Singapore and Mergui for raiding operations in the Indian Ocean, but the operation was cancelled due to reverses suffered by the Imperial Japanese Navy in the Solomon Islands. Samidare was escort for the battleship Mutsu at the Battle of the Eastern Solomons on 24 August. For most of the month of September Samidare was escort for the seaplane tender Kunikawa Maru, scouting the Solomon Islands and Santa Cruz Islands for potential seaplane bases, returning to Palau as the end of the month. In October, Samidare escorted troop convoys to Guadalcanal, and was slightly damaged in an air strike on 14 October by a near-miss. However, she was still combat-capable and conducted a "Tokyo Express" high speed transport run to Guadalcanal and a gunfire support mission as well as participating briefly in the Battle of the Santa Cruz Islands on 26 October under Admiral Takeo Kurita.

=== Naval battle of Guadalcanal ===
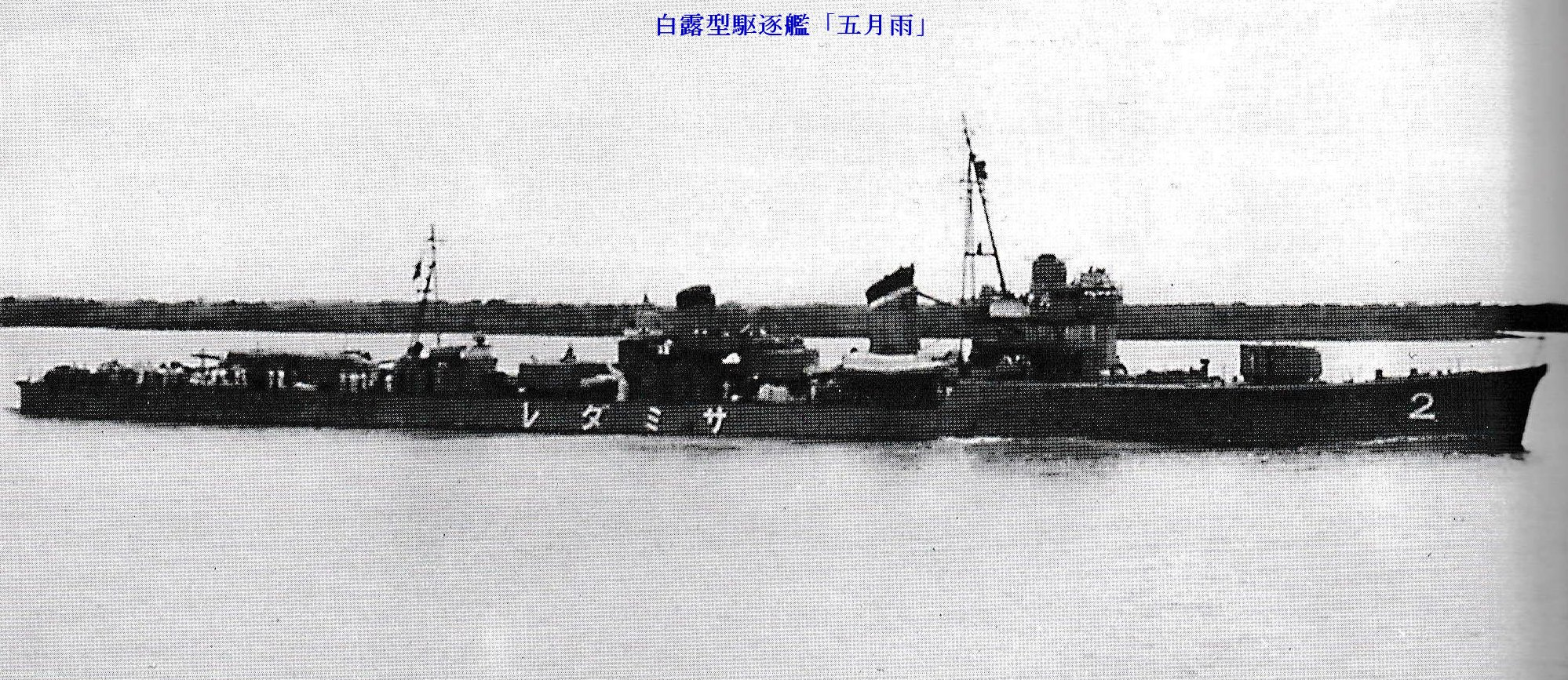
Samidare off China in 1938

In November 1942, the Japanese believed another major bombardment of Henderson Field, a former Japanese airbase being used by the Americans against their shipping to great effect, was necessary to recapture the field. Accordingly, the Japanese battleships Hiei and Kirishima were ordered to bombard Henderson Field, with an escort of the light cruiser Nagara and eleven destroyers, including Samidare and the rest of destroyer division 2. On the 9th, the force departed Truk for the bombardment. However, while underway rain squalls broke up the formation and left the destroyers grouped together in small clusters; in turn leaving Samidare as the last ship of a group, following Murasame and Asagumo.

==== First naval battle of Guadalcanal ====
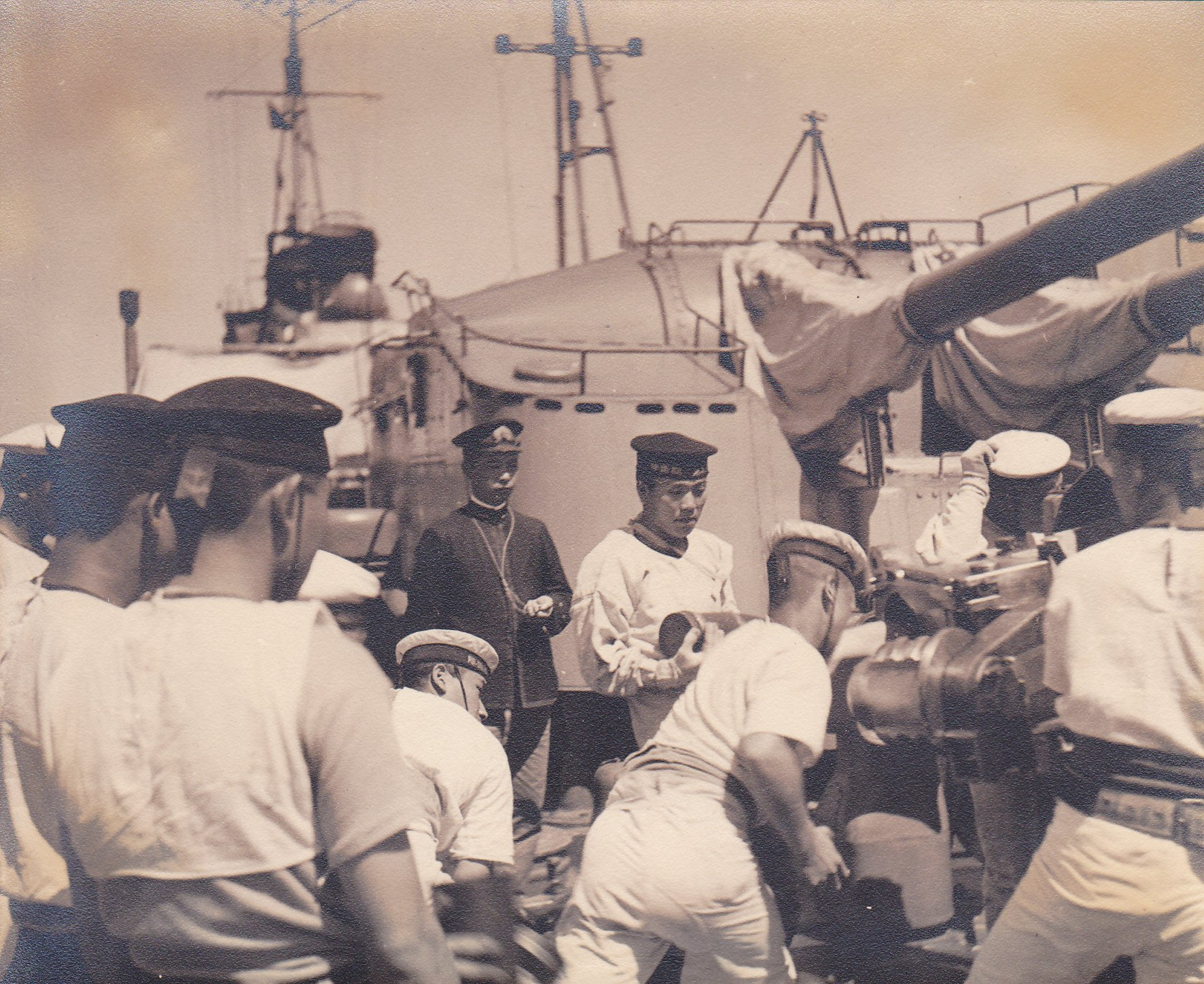
Sailors standing by Samidare's aft turrets in August 1938

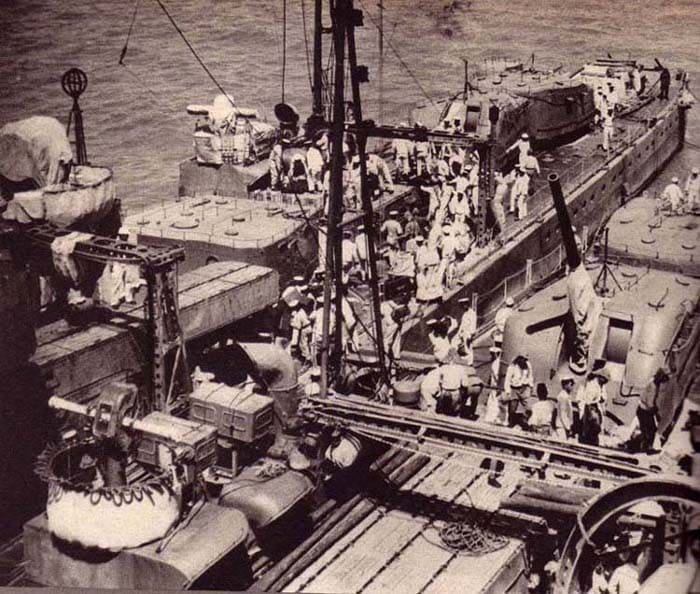
Samidare and Murasame moored together, left and right are unknown

In the early morning of the 13th, signs of enemy ships began to appear; as it turned out a US cruiser-destroyer group was tasked with intercepting the Japanese task force, and by 1:48 the searchlights of Hiei and the destroyer Akatsuki illuminated the light cruiser USS Atlanta, starting off the first naval battle of Guadalcanal in a point blank range skirmish which resulted in both Atlanta's and Akatsuki's sinking. As Asagumo, Murasame, and Samidare were far off to the back of the formation, they missed out on the initial action of the battle, racing towards the engagement at full speed. At 2:15, the trio of Japanese destroyers finally joined the action, and noticed the destroyer Amatsukaze in danger; while shelling the crippled heavy cruiser USS San Francisco she had attracted the gunfire of the light cruiser USS Helena and took five 6-inch (152 mm) shell hits. In response, Samidare, Murasame, and Asagumo closed the range and covered Amatsukaze with a smokescreen, before Murasame fired a spread of 7 torpedoes at Helena, claiming a sinking (though Helena survived without damage). In turn, Samidare was hit by a 6-inch (152 mm) shell that exploded in her bow, while Murasame took a hit which disabled her forward boiler.

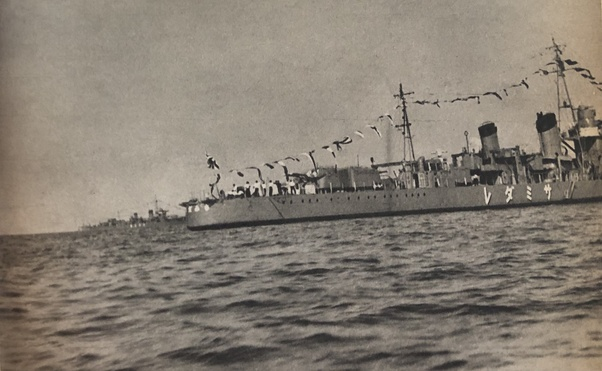
Samidare off Yokohama during a fleet review, 11 October 1940. The destroyer Arashio is behind her

Afterwards, Samidare's group scored a legitimate success when they lit an American destroyer with star shells at 2:23. As it turned out, this destroyer was the USS Monssen, which mistook the star shells for blinker lights from friendly vessels, and signaled back. In response, the "friendly vessels" blasted Monssen, Samidare joining the gunfire Two 5-inch (127 mm) shells immediately hit forward and destroyed Monssen's 5-inch (127 mm) gun turret 1, killing the entire gun crew, before more hits destroyed the forward fire room and after engine. Hiei noticed the attack, promptly bushwacked Monssen to port, and hit the destroyer with three 14-inch (356 mm) shells, while Samidare, Murasame, and Asagumo continued to smother Monssen in gunfire from the opposite side. Shell hits first plunged into the turret 2 handing room and started a powder fire which took the gun out of action, before her turret 5, bridge, fire control, and rangefinder were too destroyed. 5-inch (127 mm) guns no 3 and 4 continued to fruitlessly fire away until they too were blasted away, along with the ship's steering gear, rudder, and depth charges. Dead in the water, burning furiously, and lacking a single functioning weapon after at least 39 shell hits, Monssen was abandoned 20 minutes later and left to sink as Samidare continued on.

However, during the action Hiei was sunk and Yūdachi was crippled by 5-inch (127 mm) gunfire from the destroyer USS Sterett, Samidare to moor alongside the ship while Murasame and Asagumo stood by. Samidare rescued 207 survivors before attempting to scuttle her with torpedoes; this failed as later that morning Yūdachi was finished off by gunfire from the heavy cruiser USS Portland. Murasame was also forced to retire from the battle due to the Helena shell hit to her boiler, and after dropping off Yūdachi's survivors, Samidare continued to escort Kirishima to continue the bombardment mission.

==== Second naval battle of Guadalcanal ====
Right at the start of the 15th, the modified task force consisting of Kirishima, two heavy cruisers, two light cruisers, and nine destroyers, were encountered by another American task force, with the four screening US destroyers engaging the Japanese fleet. In response, the light cruiser Nagara, leading the destroyers Samidare, Inazuma, Shirayuki, and Hatsuyuki, engaged the force, unloading a spread of 39 torpedoes before responding with gunfire; one of Samidare's torpedoes hit the destroyer USS Walke, blasting off everything forward of her funnel, destroying her engine and boilers, detonating her 20 mm AA gun magazines, and killing 84 men. Simultaneously, the destroyer USS Preston was hit by nine 5.5-inch (14 cm) shells from Nagara which detonated her aft magazines and a torpedo from the destroyer Ayanami - both destroyers sank within 10 minutes - before the destroyer USS Benham was hit by a torpedo possibly from Shirayuki, and was scuttled after the battle. (Note: Samidare was the only ship during the initial action against the American destroyers to be equipped with type 93 torpedoes; the rest were fitted with type 90 torpedoes. Walke was hit a minute before Benham despite being at a longer distance, indicating she may have been sunk by a long lance from Samidare, as where Benham was sunk by a type 90.) (Note: Shirayuki singled out damaging/sinking an enemy destroyer. Because of this, some Japanese sources credit her with damaging USS Gwin, but angles of fire and timing proves Ayanami damaged Gwin. It is possible Shirayuki's victim was actually Benham)

Kirishima and the heavy cruisers Takao and Atago attacked the battleship USS South Dakota as she was recovering from a power outage, which they hit with some 27 shells, including three 14-inch (356 mm) shells from Kirishima's main battery. However, what the Japanese did not know was that there was not one US battleship, but two as USS Washington closed to point blank range and mauled Kirishima with twenty 16-inch (406 mm) shell hits and seventeen 5-inch (127 mm) shell hits, fatally wounding the vessel. Samidare, Asagumo, and the destroyer Teruzuki moored alongside Kirishima and evacuated her survivors, before leaving the battleship to sink over 3 hours. The Ayanami was also sunk and Atago damaged by Washington's gunfire, ending the naval battle of Guadalcanal in a crushing American victory which halted all attempts at recapturing Henderson Field.

=== Solomon Islands Campaign ===
In mid-January 1943, Samidare escorted the aircraft carrier Jun'yō from Truk to Palau and Wewak, then at the start of February served as an escort to the evacuation of Guadalcanal. Samidare was assigned to covering troop transport operations to New Guinea, Kolombangara and Tuluvu through March. At the start of April, Samidare took part in two troop transport runs to Kolombangara, then led transport runs to several more New Georgian islands. In May she returned to Yokosuka as part of the escort for the battleship Yamato, and was then assigned to northern waters with the heavy cruisers Myōkō and Haguro to cover the evacuation of Japanese forces from Kiska. In July, destroyer division 2 was deactivated as Samidare was left operating independently. She returned to Yokosuka on 6 August with the cruiser Maya for repairs, where commander Sugihara Yoshiro was assigned command of the destroyer. In September, Samidare escorted the aircraft carriers Taihō and Chūyō to Truk, then covered a troop evacuation run to Kolombangara.

At the start of October, Samidare was reassigned to destroyer division 27, which before that point was a one ship division consisting of the lone destroyer Shigure commanded by Captain Tameichi Hara and commander Yamaguchi Kamesaburou. Shigure had become very famous for surviving many battles throughout the Solomon Islands Campaign without being hit by a single shell or losing a man in combat despite her worn out state, and it was considered a great honor for Samidare to serve under the fortune ship. She immediately proved her worth the next day when both ships departed as part of the evacuation force for Kolombangara commanded by Admiral Injuin, and they were not alone. Six American destroyers were patrolling the area for Japanese barges, and three of these destroyers, USS Taylor, Ralph Talbot, and Terry stumbled upon four of Injuin's destroyers, Samidare, Shigure, Isokaze, and Minazuki. Terry fired a single salvo before her radar busted, prompting her to conduct repairs for 3 minutes while Ralph Talbot and Taylor fired away. Samidare, Shigure, Isokaze, and Minazuki returned the favor with their own gun batteries. Both sides straddled each other several times before creasing fire to unload their torpedoes, none of which hit each other. The gunfire resumed, and the three American destroyers hit Samidare with three 5-inch (127 mm) shells. However, these were duds and only inflicted cosmetic damage. Minazuki was also hit by three 5-inch (127 mm) shells, but they too were duds, and Isokaze and Shigure remained untouched. The Japanese destroyers continued their transport mission without a loss, in spite of the Americans declaring a victory.

=== Battle of Vella Lavella ===
Upon reaching port, Samidare was tasked with the evacuation of Vella Lavella. Admiral Injuin would split up his nine destroyers tasked with escorting a large flotilla of barges carrying the garrison as to confuse the enemy on their strength, leaving Samidare and Shigure operating together; they were tasked with backstabbing any enemy ships they faced as Injuin's main force of destroyers Akigumo, Kazagumo, Yūgumo, and Isokaze took the attention of the opposition. After Samidare was repaired from the previous damage, the force departed on the 6th. Rain squalls provided cover for Samidare as smooth sailing commenced. However, at noon allied aircraft spotted Injuin's force, while the Japanese intercepted an allied message that radioed such information to a nearby flotilla of American destroyers. A flight of aircraft prepared an attack, but rain squalls obscured the Japanese ships and prevented a bombing. Upon nightfall, Samidare met the barges and distanced herself from Injuin's flotilla, before she received a shocking report that enemy cruisers were spotted. In reality, just three American destroyers, USS Selfridge, Chevalier, and O'Bannon were relieved from convoy escort duty to pursue the Japanese ships. (Note: Another group of three destroyers, USS Ralph Talbot, Taylor, and La Vallette were tasked with taking part in the battle, but they did not arrive in time for the action) The three destroyers quickly located the group as Samidare and Shigure were ordered to rejoin Injuin's destroyers as they turned west. Samidare sped at 30 knots and spotted Yūgumo's flag signal.

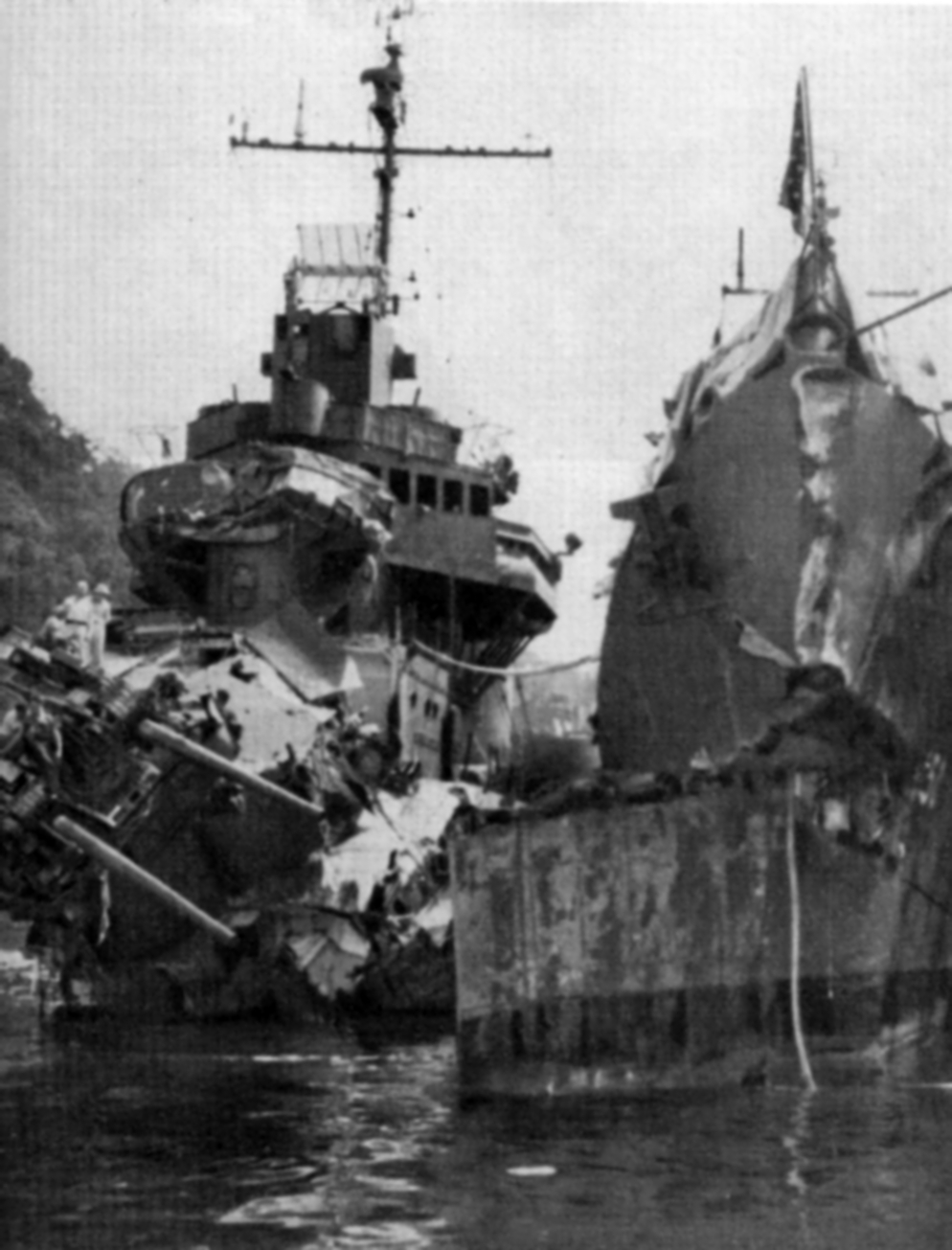
Damage to USS Selfridge (right) inflicted by a torpedo from Samidare

At 20:00, Samidare spotted the American destroyers at 11,000 yards as the Japanese ships enacted multiple simultaneous turns over the course of an hour, making them perfect targets for the American guns. Selfridge, Chevalier, and O'Bannon together dumped 14 torpedoes, then opened fire at 3,200 yards; their target was Yūgumo. She immediately took five 5-inch (127 mm) shell hits and began to lose speed while firing her own guns and eight torpedoes. Many more shell hits caused her to lose all rudder control, stop dead in the water, and burn furiously, before at least one of the American torpedoes made its mark, causing Yūgumo to immediately explode and sink with the loss of 138 sailors.

Immediately afterwards, the American destroyers spotted Samidare and Shigure at 9,000 yards and pursued. Shells rained around Samidare, but none hit as Samidare radioed Shigure for orders as a command to turn left for a torpedo charge commenced. However, one of eight torpedoes from the dying Yūgumo hit Cheavlier and forced the destroyer to join her in death with the loss of 54 men, but not before colliding with O'Bannon and taking that ship out of action. Selfridge continued to engage the enemy, her eight 5-inch (127 mm) guns straddled Samidare and Shigure several times but scored no direct hits as her course presented a perfect torpedo broadside, and in response the two Japanese destroyers at 8,500 yards together fired 16 torpedoes at their opponent, then opened fire. About 5 minutes later, one of Samidare's torpedoes gouged into Selfridge's bow, killing 50 sailors. The ship's bow was torn off as was the ship's turret 1, while turret 2 had its shields blasted off and hung by a thread. Seldridge attempted to steam in reverse, but a minute later the boilers lost power as the destroyer stopped dead in the water. She was taken out of action for six months and heavily reconstructed thanks to Samidare's torpedo hit. Samidare's crew were under the assumption her and Shigure's torpedoes hit multiple enemy cruisers, and with all three US destroyers taken out of action - Chevalier sinking and O'Bannon and Selfridge badly damaged - a victory was concluded, prompting Samidare to turn 90 degrees to port and join the transport force in reaching Rabaul.

The battle of Vella Lavella was the last Japanese naval victory of the war. Both sides traded a destroyer, but the US suffered two more destroyers badly damaged as the Japanese evacuation was completed successfully without a loss. The Japanese believed they had sunk multiple US cruisers and concluded a far larger victory than they had gained. Ceremonial daggers were gifted to commander Sugihara Yoshiro shortly before Samidare's and Shigure's crews had a banquet hosted in their honor to celebrate what was seen as a great victory the following day. A toast was performed for both ship's commanders as Samidare's crew was treated to a feast, great quantities of Sake, and Geisha women.

=== Battle of the Empress Augusta Bay ===
After continuing with troop evacuation missions throughout October, Samidare was in the Battle of Empress Augusta Bay on 2 November. During the battle, Samidare torpedoed the destroyer USS Foote but suffered medium damage from two shell hits and a collision with her sister ship Shiratsuyu which damaged her bow. She returned to Yokosuka Naval Arsenal for repairs by mid-December.

In April 1944, Samidare escorted troop convoys from Japan to Saipan and on the Truk and Palau. On 27 April, she assisted in the rescue of survivors from the torpedoed cruiser Yūbari. In May and early June, Samidare covered troop evacuations from Biak and other locations in the Netherlands East Indies. She participated in the Battle of the Philippine Sea on 19–20 June as part of Admiral Takatsugu Jōjima's task force. In July, she escorted a troop convoy to Okinawa and to Lingga, returning with Kinu to Palau in August. However, on 18 August, Samidare ran aground on the Velasco Reef near Palau Island at position 08°10′N 134°38′E. On 25 August, she was torpedoed by the submarine USS Batfish. The destroyer broke in two with her stern-section sinking, and the bow-section later destroyed by the Japanese.
