= Japanese ship Kamome =

Two Japanese warships have borne the name Kamome:

- Japanese torpedo boat Kamome (1904), a Hayabusa-class torpedo boat launched in 1904 and stricken in 1923
- Japanese minelayer Kamome (1929), a Tsubame-class minelayer launched in 1929 and sunk in 1944
