= Japanese ship Tsubame =

Two Japanese warships have borne the name Tsubame:

- Japanese torpedo boat Tsubame (1903), a Hayabusa-class torpedo boat launched in 1903 and stricken in 1923
- Japanese minelayer Tsubame (1929), a Tsubame-class minelayer launched in 1929 and sunk in 1945
