= Japanese destroyer Shiratsuyu =

Two destroyers of the Imperial Japanese Navy were named Shiratsuyu:

- Japanese destroyer Shiratsuyu (1906), a Kamikaze-class destroyer launched in 1906 and stricken in 1928
- Japanese destroyer Shiratsuyu (1935), a Shiratsuyu-class destroyer launched in 1935 and sunk in 1944
