= Natsushima-class minelayer =

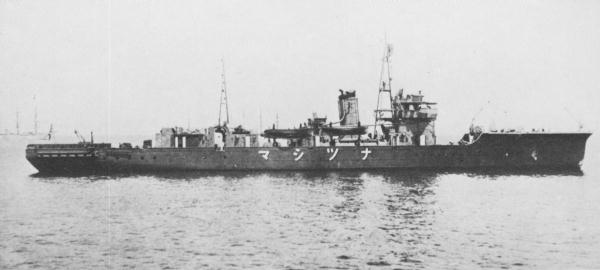
- Natsushima in 1933

Class overview
- Name: Natsushima class
- Builders: Tōkyō Ishikawajima Zōsen Corporation; Harima Zōsen Corporation; Mitsubishi Heavy Industries
- Operators: Imperial Japanese Navy
- Preceded by: Tsubame class
- Succeeded by: Sokuten class
- Subclasses: Natsushima class; Sarushima class
- Built: 1931–1934
- In commission: 1933–1944
- Completed: 3
- Lost: 3

General characteristics Natsushima class
- Type: Netlayer/Minelayer
- Displacement: 475.8 long tons (483 t) standard
- Length: 73.00 m (239 ft 6 in) overall
- Beam: 7.50 m (24 ft 7 in)
- Draught: 1.95 m (6 ft 5 in)
- Installed power: 2 × Kampon mix-fired boilers; 2,300 shp (1,700 kW)
- Propulsion: 2 × triple-expansion steam engines; 2 shafts
- Speed: 19.0 knots (35.2 km/h; 21.9 mph)
- Range: 2,500 nmi (4,600 km; 2,900 mi) at 14 kn (26 km/h; 16 mph)
- Complement: 74
- Armament: 2 × 76.2 mm (3.00 in) L/40 AA guns; 1 × 13 mm AA guns; 120 × Type 89 naval mines or 18 × depth charges or 1 × Type 14 510 m anti-submarine net

General characteristics Sarushima class
- Type: Netlayer/Minelayer
- Displacement: 566 long tons (575 t) standard
- Length: 73.00 m (239 ft 6 in) overall
- Beam: 7.49 m (24 ft 7 in)
- Draught: 2.02 m (6 ft 8 in)
- Installed power: 2,100 bhp (1,600 kW)
- Propulsion: 2 × MAN Mk.2 Model 9 diesels; 2 shafts
- Speed: 18.0 knots (33.3 km/h; 20.7 mph)
- Range: 4,639 nmi (8,591 km; 5,338 mi) at 14.4 kn (26.7 km/h; 16.6 mph)
- Complement: 64
- Armament: same as Natsushima class

The Natsushima-class minelayer (夏島型敷設艇,, Natsushima-gata Fusetsutei) was a class of minelayers of the Imperial Japanese Navy (IJN), serving during and after the 1930s through World War II. Their design was based on the Tsubame class, but with increased armament.

== Ships in class ==
=== Natsushima class ===
Project number H5. Three vessels were planned under the Maru 1 Programme. However, the third ship, Sarushima, was used as a diesel engine experiment ship.

Natsushima (夏島)

- 24 December 1931: Laid down at Tōkyō Ishikawajima Zōsen.
- 24 March 1933: Launched.
- 31 July 1933: Completed.
- In 1934: Rebuilding after the Tomozuru Incident.
- In 1938: Sortie for the Second Sino-Japanese War.
- 1941-1943: Sortie for the naval mine laying at Japan Mainland.
- 10 December 1943: Dispatched to southeast area.
- 22 February 1944: Sunk by USS Stanly, USS Charles Ausburne and USS Dyson off Kavieng 02°40′S 149°40′E.
- 30 April 1944: Removed from naval ship list.

Nasami (那沙美)

- 19 January 1933: Laid down at Harima Zōsen.
- 26 March 1934: Launched.
- 20 September 1934: Completed.
- In 1938: Sortie for the Second Sino-Japanese War.
- 1941-1943: Sortie for the naval mine laying at Japan Mainland and convoy escort operations at East China Sea.
- 31 December 1943: Dispatched to southeast area.
- 1 April 1944: Sunk by air raid at Rabaul.
- 10 April 1944: Removed from naval ship list.

=== Sarushima class ===
Project number H5B. She was built as diesel engine experiment ship. Her results were made use of in the Sokuten class.

Sarushima (猿島)

- 28 March 1933: Laid down at Mitsubishi, Yokohama shipyard.
- 16 December 1933: Launched.
- 20 July 1934: Completed.
- In 1938: Sortie for the Second Sino-Japanese War.
- 1941-1944: Sortie for the naval mine laying and convoy escort operations at Japan Mainland.
- 4 July 1944: Sunk by air raid off Otōto-jima.
- 10 September 1944: Removed from naval ship list.

== Photos ==
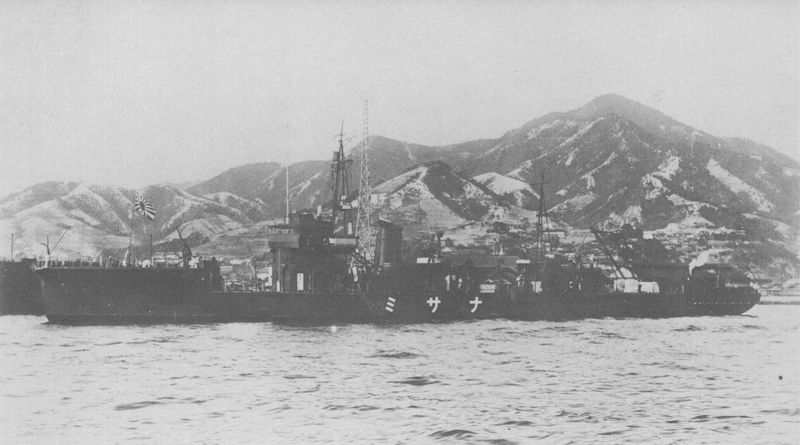
Nasami in 1934.

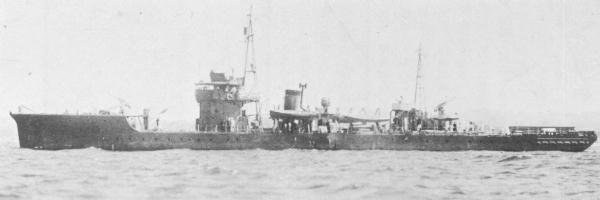
Sarushima in 1942.

== Bibliography ==
- Ships of the World special issue Vol.45, "Escort Vessels of the Imperial Japanese Navy", "Kaijinsha"., (Tokyo, Japan), 1996.
- The Maru Special, Japanese Naval Vessels No.47, "Japanese naval mine warfare crafts", "Ushio Shobō". (Tokyo, Japan), 1981.
