= Japanese minelayer Sarushima =

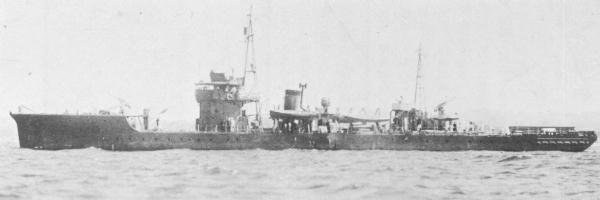
- Sarushima in 1942

History

Japan
- Name: Sarushima
- Ordered: fiscal 1931
- Builder: Mitsubishi Yokohama Shipyard
- Laid down: March 28, 1933
- Launched: December 16, 1933
- Commissioned: July 20, 1934
- Stricken: September 10, 1944
- Fate: Sunk in action, July 4, 1944

General characteristics
- Type: minelayer
- Displacement: 565.6 long tons (575 t) standard, 582.7 tons normal
- Length: 67 m (220 ft) pp, 70 m (230 ft) waterline
- Beam: 7.49 m (24 ft 7 in)
- Draught: 1.85 m (6 ft 1 in)
- Propulsion: 2-shaft diesel engine, 2 boilers, 2,100 hp (1,600 kW)
- Speed: 18 knots (21 mph; 33 km/h)
- Range: 4,639 nmi (8,591 km) at 14.4 knots
- Complement: 94
- Armament: 2 × Type 3 80 mm AA Gun AA gun; 1 × Type 93 13 mm AA Guns; 120 naval mines
- Armour: none

Sarushima (猿島) was a small Natsushima-class minelayer of the Imperial Japanese Navy, which was in service during World War II. She was named after Sarushima Island, a small island in Tokyo Bay, offshore Yokosuka, Kanagawa. She was designed as an auxiliary minelayer and escort vessel.

== Building ==
The Maru 1 Supplementary Naval Expansion Budget of 1931 authorized the construction of the huge minelayer Okinoshima as well as three smaller minelayers for coastal and river service, the Natsushima and Nasami as well as Sarushima. Sarushima was a slightly enlarged version of the Natsushima class, with the same armament, but with diesel engines. Sarushima was launched by the Mitsubishi Yokohama shipyards on December 16, 1933, and was commissioned into service on July 20, 1934.

== Operational history ==
On completion, Sarushima was assigned to the Yokosuka Naval District. After the start of the Second Sino-Japanese War, she was dispatched to patrol the inland waters of China, and was based at Jiujiang under the China Expeditionary Fleet on July 1, 1938.

At the time of the attack on Pearl Harbor in December 1941, Sarushima was assigned to the Yokosuka Guard District, remaining in Japanese home waters for most of the duration of the war, and occasionally escorting convoys to the Bonin Islands.

On April 15, 1944, Sarushima departed Tokyo with a convoy for Saipan, returning safety on May 4. On May 17, she departed with another convoy for Saipan and Guam. During the return leg of the voyage, the convoy was attacked on June 2 by USS Shark (SS-314) (which sank one transport), and on June 4 by USS Flier (SS-250) (which sank another). Sarushima launched depth charges, but failed to sink either submarine.

On June 28, Sarushima escorted a convoy from Tokyo to Chichijima in the Bonin Islands. On the return voyage, the convoy was attacked by United States Navy carrier-based aircraft, which sank all of the ships in the convoy, including Sarushima at position 12°15′N 121°00′E. Sarushima was removed from the Navy List on September 10, 1944.
