= 1st Naval Armaments Supplement Programme =

First of four Imperial Japanese Naval Expansion plans

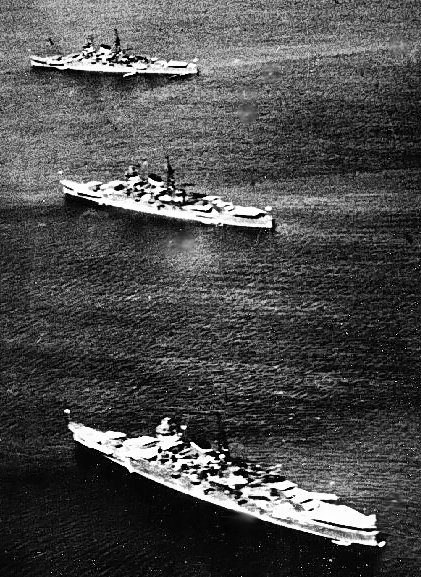
IJN cruisers Mogami, Mikuma, Kumano all constructed under the "Circle One" plan

The 1st Naval Armaments Supplement Programme (第一次補充計画, Dai-Ichi-Ji Hojū Keikaku), otherwise known as the "Circle One Plan" (マル1計画, Maru 1 Keikaku) was the first of four expansion plans of the Imperial Japanese Navy between 1930 and the start of World War II.

== Background ==
The London Naval Treaty placed severe restrictions on Japan's naval capabilities vis-a-vis the United States Navy and the British Royal Navy in terms of tonnage and numbers of capital warships. The response of the Imperial Japanese Navy General Staff was to initiate a construction program to build new warships to the allotted tonnage limits in each of the restricted categories, and to invest in types of warships and weaponry not specifically covered by the provisions of the treaty.

The "Circle One" plan was submitted by the Naval Ministry and approved by the Cabinet in November 1930, and officially ratified by the Diet of Japan in 1931. It called for the construction of 39 new combat vessels, centering on four of the new Mogami-class cruisers, and expansion of the Imperial Japanese Navy Air Service to 14 Naval Air Groups. Budget for the construction of the warships was on a six-year basis, and the budget for forming the air groups was on a three-year basis. Total funding allotted was 247,080,000 Yen for ship construction and 44,956,000 Yen for naval aviation expansion.

In terms of naval aviation development, the "Circle One" plan also concentrated on the development of new aircraft technologies, especially large seaplanes, land-based bombers, as well as carrier-based attack aircraft and floatplane attack aircraft that could be launched from battleships, cruisers or submarines. Attention was also given to training of pilots and air crews in dive bombing and torpedo tactics.

In a 1932 supplement to the Circle One plan, additional funding was added for the construction of three more vessels: the submarine tender Taigei, and two submarine chasers.

== Table of vessels ==
Vessels
Category	Class	Planned	Completed	Converted
Light cruiser	Mogami	4	Mogami, Mikuma, Suzuya, Kumano	
Destroyer	Hatsuharu	12	Hatsuharu, Nenohi, Wakaba, Hatsushimo, Ariake, Yūgure	6 vessels were converted to Shiratsuyu class
Destroyer	Shiratsuyu		Shiratsuyu, Shigure, Murasame, Yūdachi, Harusame, Samidare	6 vessels were converted from Hatsuharu class
Torpedo boat	Chidori	4	Chidori, Manazuru, Tomozuru, Hatsukari	
Cruiser submarine	I-6	1	I-6	
Large sized submarine	I-68	6	I-68, I-69, I-70, I-71, I-72, I-73	
Medium-sized submarine	Ro-33	2	Ro-33, Ro-34	
Submarine tender	Taigei	1	Taigei	later converted to the aircraft carrier Ryūhō
Minelayer	Okinoshima	1	Okinoshima	
Minelayer	Natsushima	3	Natsushima, Nasami, Sarushima	
Minesweeper	No.13	6	No.13 to No.18	
Subchaser	No.1	2	No.1 and No.2	

== See also ==
- 2nd Naval Armaments Supplement Programme (Maru 2 Keikaku, 1934)
- 3rd Naval Armaments Supplement Programme (Maru 3 Keikaku, 1937)
- 4th Naval Armaments Supplement Programme (Maru 4 Keikaku, 1939)
- Temporal Naval Armaments Supplement Programme (Maru Rin Keikaku, 1940)
- Rapidly Naval Armaments Supplement Programme (Maru Kyū Keikaku, 1941)
- Additional Naval Armaments Supplement Programme (Maru Tui Keikaku, 1941)
- 5th Naval Armaments Supplement Programme (Maru 5 Keikaku, 1941)
- 6th Naval Armaments Supplement Programme (Maru 6 Keikaku, 1942)
- Modified 5th Naval Armaments Supplement Programme (Kai-Maru 5 Keikaku, 1942)
- Wartime Naval Armaments Supplement Programme (Maru Sen Keikaku, 1944)
