= Battle of Empress Augusta Bay =

1943 battle of World War II

- Part of the Bougainville Campaign of the Pacific Theater (World War II)
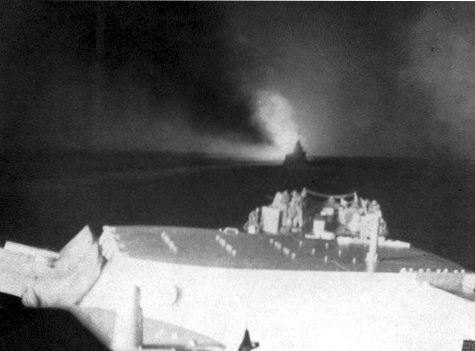
- View forward from the US light cruiser Columbia towards the US light cruiser Cleveland as both ships fire at Japanese warships during the battle
Date	1–2 November 1943
Location	Empress Augusta Bay, Bougainville, Territory of New Guinea 6°24′S 155°9′E
Result	American victory

Belligerents
United States	Japan

Commanders and leaders
(United States) Aaron S. Merrill (United States) Arleigh Burke	(Empire of Japan) Sentaro Omori (Empire of Japan) Matsuji Ijuin

Units involved
(United States) Task Force 39	(Empire of Japan) Cruiser Division 5

Strength
4 light cruisers 8 destroyers Land-based combat air patrol	2 heavy cruisers 2 light cruisers 6 destroyers 100 aircraft

Casualties and losses
1 cruiser damaged 2 destroyers damaged 19 killed	1 light cruiser sunk 1 destroyer sunk 1 heavy cruiser damaged 1 light cruiser damaged 2 destroyers heavily damaged 25 aircraft shot down 198–658 killed (Note: Sources differ on Japanese personnel losses in naval battle. Breakdown of deaths by ship and source: Sendai – 412 (Dull), 185 (Hackett and Kingsepp), 320 (Morison), and 335 (Hara); Hatsukaze – 9 (Dull) and 240 (Nevitt, Morison, and Hara); Shiratsuyu – 4 (Nevitt) and 5 (Hara); Samidare – 1 (Hara).)

The Battle of Empress Augusta Bay, on 1–2 November 1943, also known as the Battle of Gazelle Bay, Operation Cherry Blossom, and in Japanese sources as the Sea Battle off Bougainville Island (ブーゲンビル島沖海戦), was a naval battle fought at night in Empress Augusta Bay near Bougainville Island. The naval battle was a result of Allied landings at Cape Torokina in the first action in the Bougainville campaign of World War II. It is also considered part of the Solomons and New Guinea campaigns. The battle was significant as part of a broader Allied strategy—known as Operation Cartwheel—aimed at isolating and surrounding the major Japanese base at Rabaul. The intention was to establish a beachhead on Bougainville, within which an airfield would be built.

The naval battle took place at the end of the first day of the landings around Cape Torokina, as the Japanese sortied a large force from Rabaul in an effort to replicate the success they had achieved at Savo Island in August 1942, in response to Allied amphibious landings in the eastern Solomon Islands. Ultimately, the covering force of US warships was able to turn back the Japanese force, and the landings around Cape Torokina were successful.

== Background ==
On 1 November 1943, the 3rd Marine Division landed at Cape Torokina in Empress Augusta Bay on Bougainville Island. (Note: Known as Gazere Wan, or Gazelle Bay, to the Japanese) Following in the wake of Allied successes in the Solomon Islands campaign, the landings were undertaken as part of an Allied plan to establish airbases in the region to project airpower towards the Japanese stronghold around Rabaul, the reduction and isolation of which was a key part of Operation Cartwheel. The bay had been chosen because it was at the outer limit of Allied fighter plane range and because the numerically superior Japanese 17th Army was concentrated at other, more strategic sites in the north and the south. The Marines were backed by Task Force 39, composed of cruisers and destroyers, commanded by Rear Admiral Aaron S. Merrill. Merrill's force was tasked with covering the vulnerable transports and minelayers from air attack and from attack from the sea.

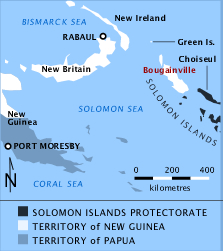
Location of Bougainville

The Japanese responded with air attacks and a powerful naval force from Rabaul commanded by Rear Admiral Sentaro Omori, attempting to replicate the success they had achieved at Savo Island in August 1942, in response to Allied amphibious landings in the eastern Solomon Islands. The Japanese formation was hastily assembled from whatever ships were on hand, many of which had never trained or fought together before. Omori's force consisted of the heavy cruisers Myōkō and Haguro, the light cruisers Agano and Sendai, and the destroyers Naganami, Hatsukaze, Wakatsuki, Shigure, Samidare, and Shiratsuyu. These were organized into a cruiser division (Cruiser Division 5), which contained the two heavy cruisers, and two screens (left and right) with a light cruiser and three destroyers. The left screen was commanded by Rear Admiral Ijuin Matsuji, while the right was under Rear Admiral Morikazu Osugi's command. Initially, this force had included five destroyer transports laden with troops for a counter-landing, but following several delays, the decision was made for the transports to return to Rabaul. This force would later land around Koromokina Lagoon on 7/8 November.

Ranged against the Japanese force was Merrill's Task Force 39 (TF39). The heart of TF39 was Cruiser Division (CruDiv) 12 – USS Montpelier, Cleveland, Columbia, and Denver. These four Cleveland-class cruisers were officially categorized as light cruisers; however, they were nearly the size of the Japanese heavy cruisers and were armed with twelve radar-aimed 6-inch (152 mm) rapid fire guns. TF39 also included Destroyer Squadron (DesRon) 23, which consisted of two destroyer divisions (DesDiv): DesDiv 45 – USS Charles Ausburne, Dyson, Stanly, Claxton and DesDiv 46 – Spence, Thatcher, Converse, Foote. Merrill had overall command of the force, as well as directly commanding CruDiv 12, while Captain Arleigh Burke commanded DesDiv 45 and Commander Bernard Austin was in command of DesDiv 46.

== Battle ==
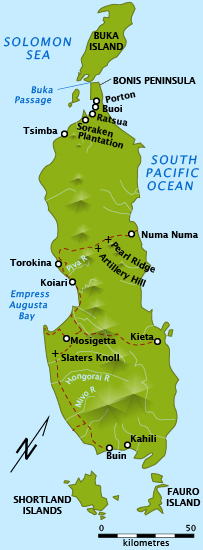
Map showing Empress Augusta Bay on the western coast of Bougainville

As the Japanese ships cruised towards Cape Torokina, the Americans were already in the process of withdrawing most of their landing craft and troop transports from around Cape Torokina, and assembling them to the southwest of Empress Augusta Bay. The 12 transports were ordered to depart around 18:00, while four cargo vessels, still only partially unloaded, remained. The US minelayers operating off Cape Moltke were also withdrawn. Meanwhile, US reconnaissance aircraft had detected Omori's force, and in response Merrill's force, which had been shelling Japanese positions around Buka in northern Bougainville the day before, began steaming north from around Vella Lavella to intercept, departing before midnight on 1/2 November. They subsequently established themselves to block the entrance to Empress Augusta Bay. The Japanese approached from the northwest, aiming to bombard the invasion force in their transports and on the shore. At 01:30 on 2 November, Haguro was struck amidships by an American aerial attack. The resulting damage necessitated a significant reduction in speed for the entire formation.

The Americans made radar contact at 02:27 on 2 November. Merrill subsequently shook his force out into three columns, sending Burke's destroyers to attack the Japanese northern flank, while the cruisers turned about to remain out of torpedo range, with the remaining destroyers from Austin's group being tasked with launching a torpedo attack on the southern flank. From the leading position in the American formation, Burke sent the four destroyers of DesDiv 45 forward for a torpedo attack and at 02:46 fired a salvo toward the Japanese. Around the same time, the Sendai-led division fired eight torpedoes. Each attack was detected, and both groups maneuvered away from the torpedoes. The Japanese fleet became separated into three groups in the confusion.

Merrill then ordered DesDiv 46 to attack. Unprepared, Foote misinterpreted the command and was separated from the other ships. Despite her captain's best efforts, Foote was unable to effectively rejoin the fight and was in some danger of colliding with other friendly ships. At around 02:50, when it became apparent that DesDiv 45's torpedo attack had failed to achieve complete surprise, the American cruisers opened fire, quickly disabling Sendai, whose rudder jammed.

After firing her torpedoes, Samidare collided with Shiratsuyu. Samidare and Shiratsuyu were subsequently forced to retire from the battle with Samidare receiving 5-inch (127 mm) hits at 03:00. Myōkō also collided with Hatsukaze, slicing off her bow. Myōkō had significant damage from this collision. Meanwhile, Haguro was hit by several cruiser shells, only a few of which detonated. Relying on visual tracking of their targets, with difficulty, the Japanese cruisers pinpointed the American cruisers and opened fire at 03:13. At 03:20 the Cruiser Squadron fired several torpedoes at CruDiv 12. At 03:27 numerous hits on CruDiv 12 were erroneously reported to Omori, but all actually missed their targets.

The Americans were also having problems as Spence and Thatcher also collided but were able to continue in the battle. Foote was struck by a torpedo which blew off the stern of the ship, leaving 19 dead and 17 wounded. Subsequently, the drifting Foote became a navigational hazard to the other ships adding to the confusion of the battle. Foote was busy for the remainder of the engagement trying to stay afloat and fighting off an enemy aircraft attack. Without fire control radar, the Japanese depended heavily on flares to illuminate their targets. CruDiv 12 repeatedly maneuvered to avoid starshells fired by the opposing ships but was finally successfully illuminated by brilliant flares dropped by Japanese snooper aircraft.

Between 03:20 and 03:25 Denver received three 8-inch (203 mm) hits which failed to detonate. Also, while closing with a group of Japanese destroyers in the center, Spence was hit at the waterline by a shell that failed to explode. At this point the Japanese fire was heavy and increasingly accurate. In response, the American cruisers began maneuvering behind a smoke screen which successfully interfered with the Japanese gunnery.

Throughout the battle the American destroyers experienced difficulty maintaining contact with each other and several times came close to firing on friendly ships, underscoring the difficulty in fighting night actions even when equipped with radar and IFF systems. A later evaluation of the battle revealed that DesDiv 46 missed an opportunity to torpedo the center group of Japanese ships because of uncertain identification. DesDiv 46 then turned north and concentrated fire on Sendai.

By 03:37, Omori, believing that he had sunk a heavy cruiser and worried about being caught in daylight by US carrier aircraft, ordered a retreat. Merrill's cruisers closed to bombard the Japanese forces withdrawing to the west, engaging Hatsukaze at over 17,500 yards (16,000 m), but they were unable to score any hits.

Around 04:00, DesDiv 45 and 46 engaged in a confused melee with retreating Japanese stragglers, sinking Sendai and driving off the remaining northern group ships. Just before 04:13 Spence lost speed because of water in the fuel line and fell out of formation. The American ships reported many hits on the enemy contacts. DesDiv 45 fired on the limping Spence in error, causing no damage. CruDiv 12 and Spence engaged a Japanese straggler at 05:10. Unable to distinguish between the straggler and Spence, the cruisers ceased fire. By 05:19, DesDiv 45 came to the aid of Spence which by this time had almost exhausted its ammunition. The Japanese straggler, the heavily damaged Hatsukaze, exploded and sank.

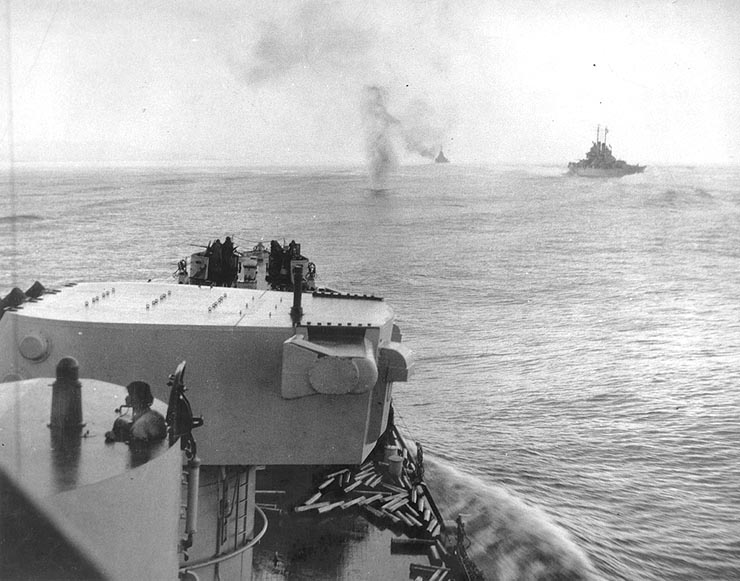
A Japanese aircraft crashes (upper center) into the ocean near the cruiser Columbia during air attacks on Allied ships off Bougainville, a few hours after the battle

At daylight the pursuit was broken off, and all ships, many low on fuel and ammunition, were ordered to rendezvous with the hapless Foote, as Merrill was concerned about the possibility of his ships being exposed to air attack. This proved prescient, as a heavy Japanese air attack, consisting of over 100 aircraft, was launched from Rabaul early in the morning, directed on the US ships that had converged around Foote. This was fought off with assistance from US and New Zealand shore-based aircraft, with heavy losses being inflicted on the attacking aircraft. The Japanese ships scored two hits on Montpelier, inflicting nine wounded. Foote was subsequently towed to Tulagi for repairs.

== Aftermath ==
The battle ended in a complete victory for the US naval force, in what author Leo Marriott describes as the "last major naval action...[of]...the Solomons campaign". They were able to deflect the Japanese away from the vulnerable transport ships and landing craft around Cape Torokina, and they had also inflicted significant damage on their opponents. For the loss of 19 killed and 26 wounded, and three ships damaged, the US ships sank one light cruiser and one destroyer and damaged two cruisers and two destroyers. Japanese casualties have been reported as being between 198 and 658 killed. Up to 25 Japanese aircraft were shot down in the air attack following the naval action. The Japanese subsequently sent a submarine to locate survivors; none were found from Hatsukaze, but some were rescued from Sendai.

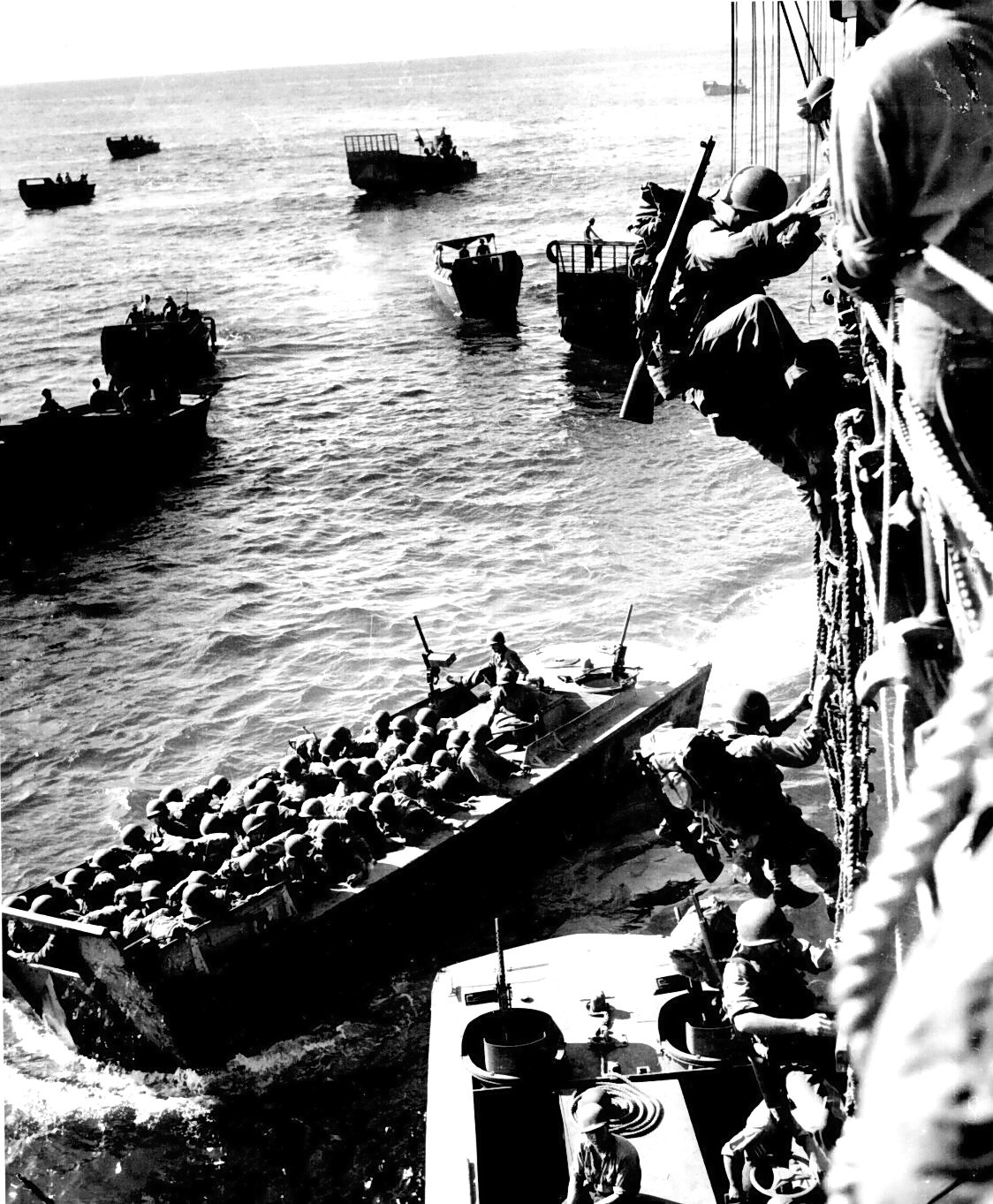
Marines board landing craft in Empress Augusta Bay

In the aftermath, the Japanese ships returned to Rabaul. There, they were joined by four cruisers and more destroyers from Truk for another attack on the Allied landing forces at Bougainville. On 5 November, however, two US aircraft carriers raided Rabaul, heavily damaging four heavy cruisers, which had to withdraw to Truk. This ended the Japanese warship threat to the Allied landing forces at Bougainville. Omori was relieved of his command as a result of the failed action.

US ground forces secured their beachhead around Cape Torokina, and the perimeter was subsequently expanded. A PT boat base was established on Puruata Island, and several airbases were built around the Cape Torokina perimeter. These were subsequently employed in the reduction of Rabaul. On the ground, throughout the remainder of 1943, the US Marines and Japanese fought several minor land battles around the perimeter, culminating in a large scale Japanese counterattack in March 1944. This counterattack was fought off with heavy Japanese losses. By the start of February 1944, the US had built up a force of over 400 aircraft on Bougainville; before the month ended the Japanese air defenses around Rabaul had been defeated.
