= Japanese destroyer Harusame (1935) =

Destroyer of the Imperial Japanese Navy

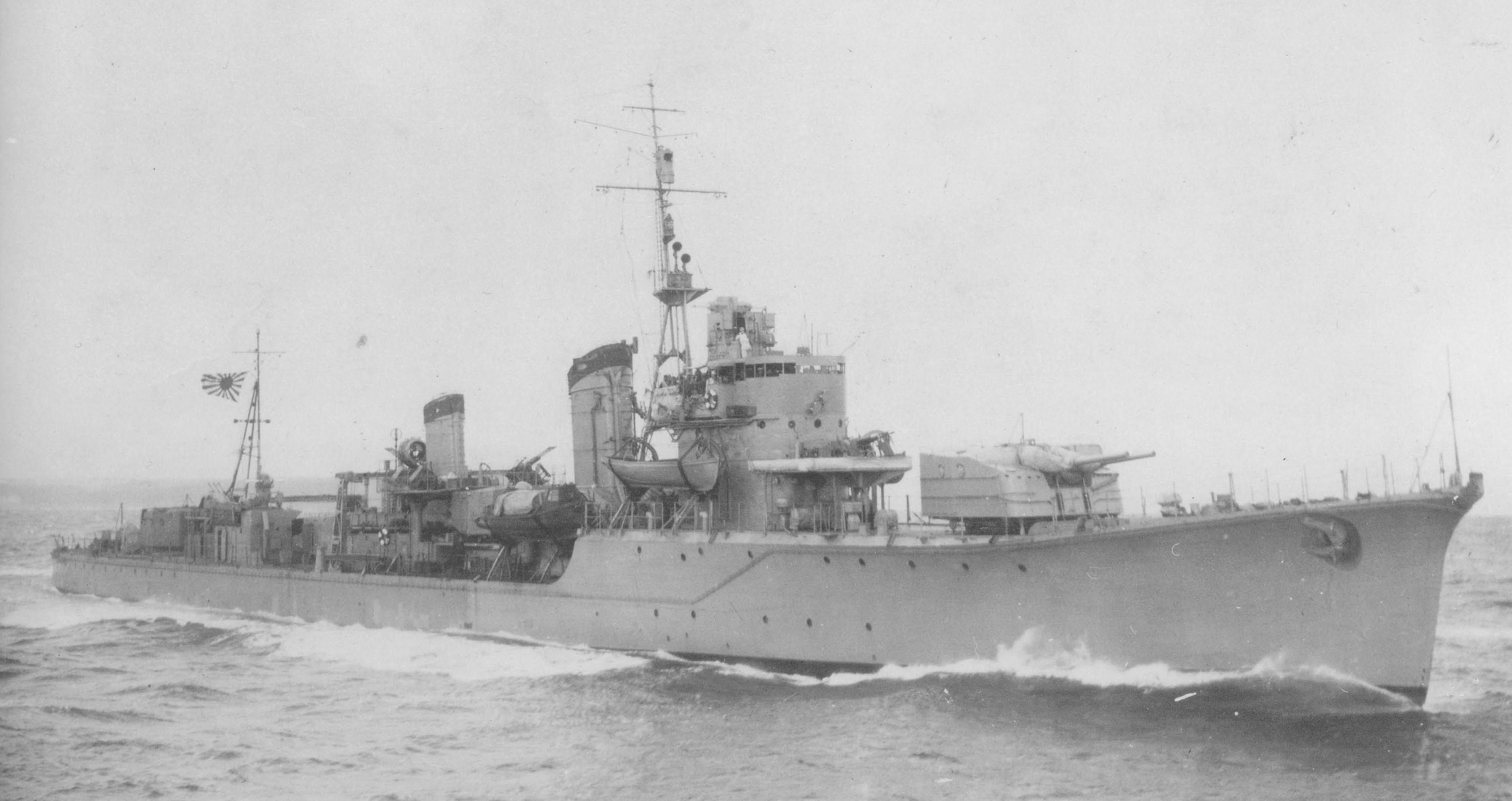
- Harusame underway on 30 November 1943.

History

Empire of Japan
- Name: Harusame
- Namesake: 春雨 (Spring Rain)
- Ordered: 1931 FY
- Builder: Maizuru Naval Arsenal
- Laid down: 3 February 1935
- Launched: 21 September 1935
- Commissioned: 26 August 1937
- Stricken: 10 August 1944
- Fate: Sunk off New Guinea, 8 June 1944

General characteristics
- Class & type: Shiratsuyu-class destroyer
- Displacement: 1,685 long tons (1,712 t)
- Length: 103.5 m (340 ft) pp; 107.5 m (352 ft 8 in) waterline
- Beam: 9.9 m (32 ft 6 in)
- Draft: 3.5 m (11 ft 6 in)
- Propulsion: 2 shaft Kampon geared turbines; 3 boilers, 42,000 hp (31,000 kW)
- Speed: 34 knots (39 mph; 63 km/h)
- Range: 4,000 nmi (7,400 km) at 18 kn (33 km/h)
- Complement: 226
- Armament: 5 × 12.7 cm/50 Type 3 naval guns (2×2, 1×1); 3 × Type 93 13 mm AA guns; 8 × 24 in (610 mm) torpedo tubes; 16 × Depth charges

Service record
- Operations: Battle of Tarakan (1942); Battle of the Java Sea (1942); Battle of Midway (1942); Battle of the Eastern Solomons (1942); Battle of the Santa Cruz Islands (1942); First Naval Battle of Guadalcanal (1942)

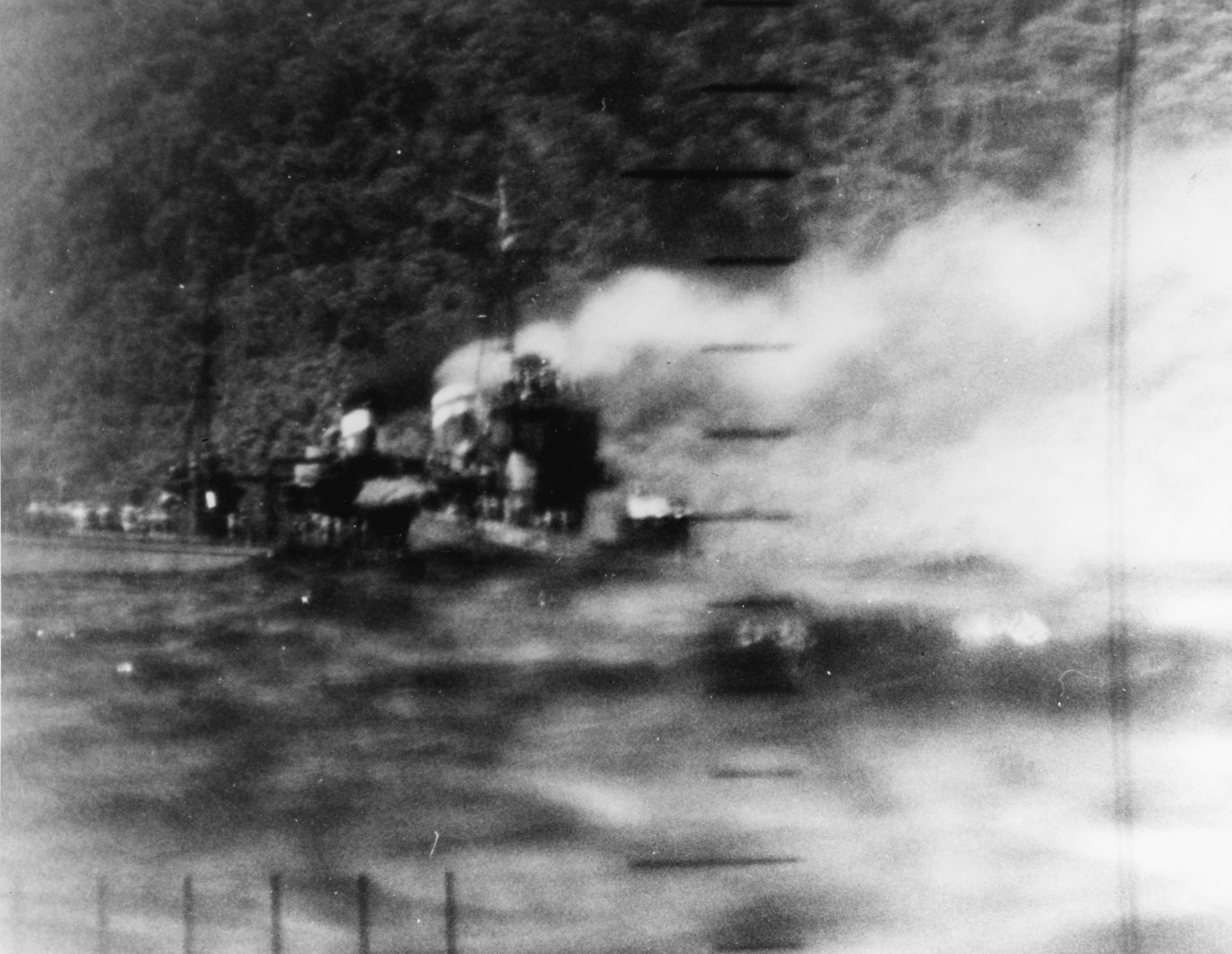
Harusame torpedoed by the US submarine Wahoo near Wewak, New Guinea, on 24 January 1943.

Harusame (春雨; "Spring Rain") was the sixth of ten Shiratsuyu-class destroyers, and was built for the Imperial Japanese Navy under the "Circle One" Program (Maru Ichi Keikaku). This vessel should not be confused with the earlier Russo-Japanese War-period Harusame-class torpedo boat destroyer with the same name.

== History ==
The Shiratsuyu-class destroyers were modified versions of the Hatsuharu class, and were designed to accompany the Japanese main striking force and to conduct both day and night torpedo attacks against the United States Navy as it advanced across the Pacific Ocean, according to Japanese naval strategic projections. Despite being one of the most powerful classes of destroyers in the world at the time of their completion, none survived the Pacific War. Harusame, built at the Maizuru Naval Arsenal was laid down on 3 February 1935, launched on 21 September 1935 and commissioned on 26 August 1937.

== Operational history ==
At the time of the attack on Pearl Harbor, Harusame was assigned to Destroyer Division 2 of Destroyer Squadron 4 of the IJN 2nd Fleet, and sortied from Mako Guard District as part of the Philippine invasion force, covering landings at Vigan and Lingayen Gulf. From January 1942, Harusame participated in operations in "Operation J". the invasion of the Netherlands East Indies, including the invasions of Tarakan Island, Balikpapan and eastern Java. During the Battle of the Java Sea, Harusame engaged a group of Allied destroyers. In March and April, Harusame was based at Subic Bay, from where she assisted in the invasion of Cebu and the blockade of Manila Bay in the Philippines. In May, she returned to Yokosuka Naval Arsenal for repairs.

During the Battle of Midway on 4–6 June, Harusame was part of the aborted Midway Occupation Force under Admiral Nobutake Kondō. In late July, she transferred to Mergui via Singapore to join the Indian Ocean raiding force, but the operation was cancelled due to developments at Guadalcanal, and she returned to Truk on 21 August.

During the Battle of the Eastern Solomons on 24 August, she was part of the escort for the battleship Mutsu, and during most of September, she was an escort for the seaplane carrier Kunikawa Maru, exploring the Solomon Islands and Santa Cruz Islands for potential base locations.

From October through mid-November, Harusame participated in nine "Tokyo Express" high-speed transport runs or surface attack missions to Guadalcanal or Lae, as well as participating briefly in the Battle of Santa Cruz on 26 October under Admiral Takeo Kurita. During the First Naval Battle of Guadalcanal on the night of 12–13 November 1942, Harusame claimed heavy damage to an Allied cruiser by her gunfire. She returned to Yokosuka for repairs in early December.

In January 1943, Harusame returned to Truk escorting the troopship Asama Maru, and continued to Wewak to resume transport operations to Kavieng. On 24 January, she was torpedoed by the submarine USS Wahoo, and had to be beached to avoid sinking. She was recovered by salvage teams, returning to Truk for emergency repairs by the end of February, and returning to Yokosuka by the end of May. At Yokosuka Naval Arsenal, one gun turret was removed and replaced by two additional triple Type 96 25 mm AT/AA Guns. She was reactivated at the end of November and returned to Truk on 11 January 1944.

Through the middle of February, Harusame escorted tanker convoys from Tarakan and Balikpapan to Truk, suffering from minor damage in an air raid by United States Navy aircraft at Truk which killed two crewmen. She was reassigned to Palau on 19 February, and patrolled from Palau until the end of March. In April and May, she performed escort duties between Davao and Lingga and Tawitawi. On 8 June, while on an assignment to evacuate troops from Biak, she was attacked, and sunk, by United States Army Air Forces B-25 bombers approximately 30 miles (48 km) northwest of Manokwari, New Guinea at position 00°05′S 132°45′E. Of her crew, 74 were killed, including squadron commander Captain Masashichi Shirahama. She was removed from the Navy list on 10 August 1944.
