= Tsubame-class minelayer =

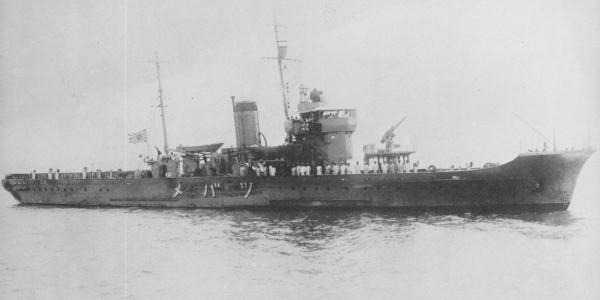
- Tsubame in April 1929

Class overview
- Name: Tsubame class
- Builders: Yokohama Dock Company; Ōsaka Iron Works
- Operators: Imperial Japanese Navy
- Preceded by: Sokuten class
- Succeeded by: Natsushima class
- Built: 1928–1929
- In commission: 1929–1945
- Planned: 2
- Completed: 2
- Lost: 2

General characteristics
- Type: Netlayer/Minelayer
- Displacement: 450 long tons (457 t) standard
- Length: 68.80 m (225 ft 9 in) overall
- Beam: 7.20 m (23 ft 7 in)
- Draught: 2.10 m (6 ft 11 in)
- Propulsion: 2 × triple expansion stages reciprocating engines; 2 × Kampon mix-fired boilers; 2 shafts, 2,500 shp (1,900 kW)
- Speed: 19.0 knots (35.2 km/h; 21.9 mph)
- Range: 1,200 nmi (2,200 km; 1,400 mi) at 10 kn (19 km/h; 12 mph)
- Complement: 43
- Armament: 1 × 76.2 mm (3.00 in) L/40 AA gun; 1 × 13.2 mm (0.52 in) machine guns; 80 × Mk.5 naval mines or 18 × depth charges or 6 × Type 14 502.5 m capture nets

The Tsubame-class minelayer (燕型敷設艇,, Tsubame-gata Fusetsutei) was a class of minelayers of the Imperial Japanese Navy (IJN), serving during and after 1929 through World War II.

== Ships in class ==
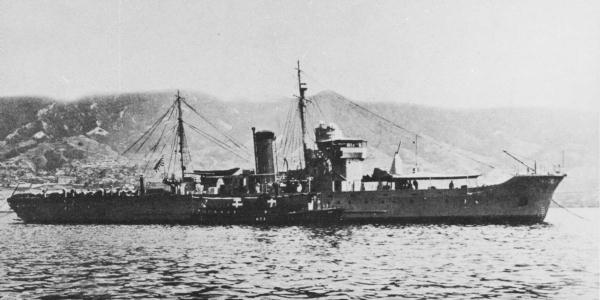
Kamome in 1929

=== Tsubame (燕) ===
- 17 September 1928: Laid down as the Capture netlayer (捕獲網艇, Hokakumōtei) at Yokohama Dock Company.
- 22 March 1929: Reclassified to 2nd class minelayer (二等敷設艇, Nitō-Fusetsutei).
- 24 April 1929: Launched.
- 10 July 1929: Completed.
- 30 May 1931: Reclassified to Special service ship (特務艇, Tokumutei).
- In 1936: Rebuilding by the Tomozuru Incident at Sasebo Naval Arsenal.
- In 1938: Sortie for the Second Sino-Japanese War.
- 18 December 1941: Sortie for the invasion of the Lingayen Gulf.
- (after): She spent all her time on convoy escort operations in East China Sea and Java Sea.
- 1 February 1944: Reclassified to Minelayer (敷設艇, Fusetsutei).
- 1 March 1945: Sunk by air raid from U.S. Navy aircraft carrier at Ishigaki Island.
- 10 May 1945: Removed from Navy List.

=== Kamome (鷗) ===
- 11 October 1928: Laid down as the Capture netlayer at Ōsaka Iron Works.
- 22 March 1929: Reclassified to 2nd class minelayer.
- 27 April 1929: Launched.
- 30 August 1929: Completed.
- 30 May 1931: Reclassified to Special service ship.
- In 1936: Rebuilding by the Tomozuru Incident at Sasebo Naval Arsenal.
- In 1938: Sortie for the Second Sino-Japanese War.
- 18 December 1941: Sortie for the invasion of the Lingayen Gulf.
- (after): She spent all her time on convoy escort operations in East China Sea, South China Sea and Java Sea.
- 1 February 1944: Reclassified to Minelayer.
- 27 April 1944: Sunk by USS Halibut at north off Naha 27°37′N 128°11′E.
- 10 June 1944: Removed from Navy List.

== Bibliography ==
- Ships of the World special issue Vol.45, Escort Vessels of the Imperial Japanese Navy, "Kaijinsha"., (Japan), February 1996
- The Maru Special, Japanese Naval Vessels No.47, Japanese naval mine warfare crafts, "Ushio Shobō". (Japan), January 1981
