= Japanese destroyer Shiratsuyu (1935) =

Destroyer of the Imperial Japanese Navy

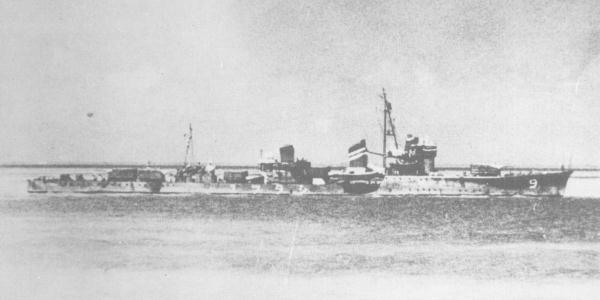
- Shiratsuyu in 1937.

History

Empire of Japan
- Name: Shiratsuyu
- Ordered: 1931 FY
- Builder: Sasebo Naval Arsenal
- Laid down: 14 November 1933
- Launched: 5 April 1935
- Commissioned: 7 September 1936
- Stricken: 10 August 1944
- Fate: Sunk in collision 15 June 1944

General characteristics
- Class & type: Shiratsuyu-class destroyer
- Displacement: 1,685 long tons (1,712 t)
- Length: 103.5 m (340 ft) pp; 107.5 m (352 ft 8 in) waterline
- Beam: 9.9 m (32 ft 6 in)
- Draft: 3.5 m (11 ft 6 in)
- Propulsion: 2 shaft Kampon geared turbines; 3 boilers, 42,000 hp (31,000 kW)
- Speed: 34 knots (39 mph; 63 km/h)
- Range: 4,000 nmi (7,400 km) at 14 kn (26 km/h)
- Complement: 180
- Armament: 5 × 12.7 cm/50 Type 3 naval guns (2×2, 1×1); 2 × 13.2 mm (0.52 in) AA guns; 8 × 24 in (610 mm) torpedo tubes; 16 × Depth charges

Service record
- Operations: Battle of Midway (1942); Battle of the Coral Sea; First Naval Battle of Guadalcanal (1942); Battle of Empress Augusta Bay (1943)

Shiratsuyu (白露, ”White Dew”) was the lead ship of ten Shiratsuyu-class destroyers, and first of six to be built for the Imperial Japanese Navy under the Circle One Program (Maru Ichi Keikaku).

== History ==
The Shiratsuyu-class destroyers were modified versions of the Hatsuharu class, and were designed to accompany the Japanese main striking force and to conduct both day and night torpedo attacks against the United States Navy as it advanced across the Pacific Ocean, according to Japanese naval strategic projections. Despite being one of the most powerful classes of destroyers in the world at the time of their completion, none survived the Pacific War. Shiratsuyu, built at the Sasebo Naval Arsenal was laid down on 14 November 1933, launched on 5 April 1935 and commissioned on 7 September 1936.

== Operational history ==
At the time of the attack on Pearl Harbor, Shiratsuyu was assigned to Destroyer Division 27 of Destroyer Squadron 1 of the IJN 1st Fleet, and remained in Japanese home waters as part of the protection of the Japanese battleship forces. From mid-January 1942, she was assigned to escorting convoys between Japan and Taiwan, and in mid-February escorted the aircraft carrier Zuihō to Davao and back to Hashirajima. In April, the destroyer escorted the aircraft carriers Shōkaku and Zuikaku from Mako to Truk, from which it joined Admiral Takeo Takagi’s Strike Force at the Battle of the Coral Sea on 7–8 May. At the end of May, the ship escorted the cruisers Myōkō and Haguro back to Kure, from which it was assigned to Admiral Shirō Takasu’s, Aleutians Guard Force during the Battle of Midway on 4–6 June. On 14 July she was assigned back to the IJN 2nd Fleet and returned to Truk in mid-August, from which she was deployed as a high speed transport to carry troops to reoccupy Makin Atoll after the Makin Raid.

Until mid-September, Shiratsuyu remained based out of Jaluit in the Marshall Islands, but from October was deployed to the Solomon Islands, where she made several "Tokyo Express" high speed transport runs to Guadalcanal. On an attack mission to Guadalcanal on 25 October, she assisted in sinking the American tugboat USS Seminole and damaging the high-speed minesweeper USS Zane (DMS-14). She participated in the First Naval Battle of Guadalcanal on the night of 12–13 November 1942, rescuing survivors from the torpedoed battleship Hiei, but was not involved in combat. On 23 November, while on a transport run to Lae, she rescued survivors from the destroyer Hayashio, which she then scuttled with a torpedo.

However, on her next mission to Buna on 28 November, Shiratsuyu took a direct hit from a bomb during an attack by USAAF B-17 Flying Fortress bombers in her bow, which required emergency repairs at Rabaul, Truk, and Saipan before she should reach Sasebo on 25 February 1943 for complete repairs. She returned to active duty on 20 July 1943 with the IJN 2nd Fleet, escorting the aircraft carrier Unyō from Yokosuka to Truk and back in late August. She returned to Rabaul in mid-October, after which she was assigned to troop transport runs to Qavuvu.

During the Battle of Empress Augusta Bay on 2 November, she collided with the destroyer Samidare, after which she was strafed by American aircraft, leaving four dead and two wounded, and necessitating a return to Sasebo in November. During this refit, one gun turret was removed and replaced by two triple 25-mm anti-aircraft guns.

She returned to Truk at the end of December as part of the escort for the cruisers Myōkō, Haguro and Tone, continuing on to Kavieng in early January. On 31 January, she rescued survivors of torpedoed Yasukuni Maru at Truk. From February through April, she was part of the escort for the battleship Musashi. From the end of April, she was reassigned to Take Ichi convoy duty, escorting troop convoys from China to the Philippines and other points in southeast Asia.

Shiratsuyu was attacked on 8 June off of Biak by US Navy aircraft, with four killed and five crewmen injured. On the night of 14 June, she collided with the Japanese tanker Seiyo Maru 90 nautical miles (170 km) southeast of Surigao Strait (09°09′N 126°51′E), after which her depth charges exploded among survivors. Of her crew, 104 were killed, including her Captain (Cdr Kuro Matsuda). She was removed from the navy list on 10 August 1944.
