= Shirō Takasu =

Japanese naval officer

- 高須 四郎
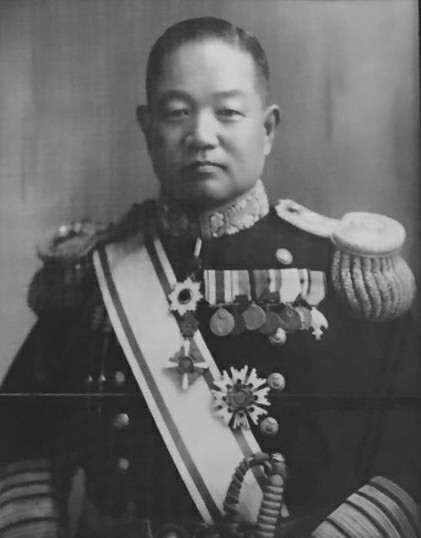
- Born: October 27, 1884; Ibaraki Prefecture, Japan
- Died: September 2, 1944 (aged 59)
- Military career
- Allegiance: Empire of Japan
- Branch: Imperial Japanese Navy
- Service years: 1907–1944
- Rank: Admiral
- Commands: Isuzu, Naval Intelligence Bureau, 1st Carrier Division, Training Fleet, Manchuria Expeditionary Force, Naval War College, 5th Fleet, 2nd China Expeditionary Fleet, 4th Fleet, 1st Fleet, Southwest Area Fleet, 2nd Southern Expeditionary Fleet, 13th Air Fleet, Naval Councillor
- Conflicts: Second Sino-Japanese War; World War II

Admiral Shirō Takasu (高須 四郎, Takasu Shirō; October 27, 1884 – September 2, 1944) was a career naval officer in the Imperial Japanese Navy during World War II.

== Biography ==
Takasu was a native of Sakuragawa Village, (currently part of Inashiki, Ibaraki), and graduated from the 35th class of the Imperial Japanese Naval Academy, where his classmates included future admirals Nobutake Kondō and Naokuni Nomura. He served his midshipman duty on the cruisers Itsukushima and Akashi, and as sublieutenant on the battleship Aki, cruiser Azuma, and battlecruiser Tsukuba.

Takasu was commissioned as a lieutenant in December 1913, serving on the battleship Kawachi, followed by the cruiser Tokiwa. He attended the 17th class of the Naval Staff College and was promoted to lieutenant commander upon graduation in December 1919. On June 23, he was assigned as a military attaché to the United Kingdom and was promoted to commander in December of the same year. During his time in the UK, Takasu was instrumental in intelligence activities to obtain British naval aviation technology for the Japanese navy to use. This work included recruiting both the Sempill Mission and Frederick Rutland to come to Japan. After his return to Japan in 1924, he served as executive officer on the cruiser Iwate. A year later, he was assigned as an instructor at the Naval War College and promoted to captain in December 1928, after which he received his first command, the cruiser Isuzu in 1929.

Takasu returned to England again in December 1930 to serve as military advisor on the ambassador’s staff, where he recruited Frederick Rutland to work for the Japanese Navy for a second time. He served on the court marshal of the perpetrators of the May 15 Incident in 1932. He was promoted to rear admiral on November 15, 1934 and reassigned to head the 3rd Bureau of the Imperial Japanese Navy General Staff, which was in charge of military intelligence. An outspoken opponent to the Tripartite Alliance between Japan, Nazi Germany and Fascist Italy, he was a member of the naval faction led by Isoroku Yamamoto and Mitsumasa Yonai opposed to war with the western powers. From 1936-1937, he commanded the First Carrier Division, which was active in combat in the early stages of the Second Sino-Japanese War, and was a naval advisor to the fledgling state of Manchukuo in 1937. Promoted to vice admiral on November 15, 1938, he then became commandant of the Naval War College. He was assigned as commander of the IJN 5th Fleet on September 29, 1939.

On April 29, 1940, Takasu was awarded the Order of the Rising Sun, 1st class.

On November 15, 1940, Takasu was assigned to command the IJN 4th Fleet, and from August 11, 1941, the IJN 1st Fleet. As the military position of Japan became precarious in the Solomon Islands and other areas of the Southwest Pacific, Takasu was assigned to command the Southwest Area Fleet from September 15, 1942. The IJN 13th Air Fleet also came under his command from September 20, 1943. Promoted to full admiral on March 1, 1944, he was recalled to Japan on June 18, to assume the position of military councilor. However, he died of sickness only two months later and his grave is at the Aoyama Cemetery in Tokyo.

== Notes ==
Military offices
Preceded by Mitsui Seizaburō	3rd Fleet; Chief-of-staff; 1 April 1933 - 15 November 1933	Succeeded by Kondō Eijirō
Preceded by Satō Saburō	1st Carrier Division; Commander; 1 December 1936 - 1 December 1937	Succeeded by Kusaka Jin'ichi
Preceded by Koga Mineichi	Training Fleet; Commander-in-chief; 1 December 1937 - 1 August 1938	Succeeded by Tanimoto Umatarō
Preceded by Hibino Masaharu	Naval War College; Headmaster; 15 November 1938 - 29 September 1939	Vacant; post next held by Sawamoto Yorio
Preceded by Kondō Nobutake	5th Fleet; Commander-in-chief; 29 September 1939 – 15 November 1939	Reorganized into 2nd China Expeditionary Fleet; Himself; Fleet dissolved, post next held by Hosogaya Boshirō
Fleet reorganized from 5th Fleet; Himself	2nd China Expeditionary Fleet; Commander-in-chief; 15 November 1939 – 15 October 1940	Succeeded by Sawamoto Yorio
Preceded by Katagiri Eikichi	4th Fleet; Commander-in-chief; 15 November 1940 – 11 August 1941	Succeeded by Inoue Shigeyoshi
Preceded by Yamamoto Isoroku	1st Fleet; Commander-in-chief; 11 August 1941 – 14 July 1942	Succeeded by Shimizu Mitsumi
Preceded by Takahashi Ibō	Southwest Area Fleet; Commander-in-chief; 15 September 1942 - 18 June 1944	Succeeded by Mikawa Gunichi
