= USS Alden =

Clemson-class destroyer

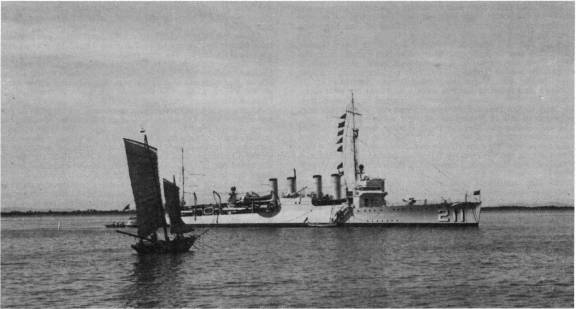
- USS Alden (DD-211), in Chefoo, China

History

United States
- Name: USS Alden
- Namesake: James Alden, Jr.
- Builder: William Cramp & Sons, Philadelphia
- Yard number: 477
- Laid down: 24 October 1918
- Launched: 14 May 1919
- Commissioned: 24 November 1919
- Decommissioned: 24 January 1923
- Recommissioned: 8 May 1930
- Decommissioned: 15 July 1945
- Stricken: 13 August 1945
- Fate: Sold for scrapping 30 November 1945

General characteristics
- Class & type: Clemson-class destroyer
- Displacement: 1,215 tons
- Length: 314 ft 5 in (95.83 m)
- Beam: 31 ft 8 in (9.65 m)
- Draft: 9 ft 10 in (3.00 m)
- Propulsion: geared turbines; 2 screws; 26,500 SHP (20 MW)
- Speed: 35 knots (65 km/h)
- Range: 4,900 nautical miles (9,100 km) at 15 knots (28 km/h)
- Complement: 106 officers and enlisted
- Armament: 4 × 4 in/50 cal (102 mm) guns; 1 × 3 in (76 mm) gun; 12 × 21-inch (533 mm) torpedo tubes

USS Alden (DD-211) was a Clemson-class destroyer of the United States Navy (USN). Serving during World War II, Alden is the only ship of the US Navy to have been named for Rear Admiral James Alden, Jr. (1810–1877).

== Construction ==
Alden was laid down on 24 October 1918 and launched on 14 May 1919 by William Cramp & Sons, sponsored by Miss Sarah Alden Dorsey, a niece of the late Rear Admiral Alden, and commissioned on 24 November 1919.

== Service history ==
=== Inter War-Period ===
==== 1920–23 ====
Following shakedown training and post-shakedown repairs and alterations, Alden, subsequently her classification changed from "Destroyer No 211" to DD-211 during the fleet-wide assignment of alphanumeric hull numbers on 17 July 1920, sailed on 5 December 1919 for duty in European waters, proceeding to Constantinople, and then to Samsun, Turkey.

Alden visited Adriatic ports during the spring of 1920, investigating political conditions and "showing the flag" to protect American interests in the area, her ports of call including Split, Gravosa, and Pula. During her trips along the Adriatic coast, she carried mail and passengers, and for a time served as station ship at Venice. Proceeding to Constantinople to participate in relief efforts for refugees from the Russian Civil War, she resumed her Adriatic operations soon afterwards, visiting Kotor and Split before she returned to Venice on 12–13 December 1920. She then again visited Split and Gravosa, in succession, before she proceeded to Salonika, Greece, where she arrived on 15 December.

Released from duty with the United States Naval Detachment in the Adriatic soon afterwards, Alden sailed for the Asiatic Station via the Suez Canal. She ultimately reached Manila, Philippine Islands, on 2 February 1921. Following upkeep at the Asiatic Fleet's base at Cavite, the destroyer sailed for Chinese waters, and arrived at Chefoo on 22 June. She operated out of the Asiatic Fleet destroyers' summer base until 15 September, when she sailed for Shanghai. Assigned special duty, Alden wound up her ten-day stay in that port on 27 September and cleared Shanghai for the Yangtze River port of Hankow, which she reached on 1 October. Remaining there until the 7th, she proceeded back to Shanghai, arriving on the 9th to stay only long enough to fuel and take on provisions, before she sailed for the Philippines the same day.

Alden arrived at Cavite on 12 October, sailed to Manila two days later for a three-day liberty and recreation port visit. The ship then spent two months operating out of Olongapo on target practice, returning to Manila on 17 December. She then fueled and took on stores at Cavite before she sailed to Mariveles, where she operated with Asiatic Fleet submarines. Alden then conducted long-range battle practice evolutions out of Manila until January 1922. Subsequently, she based temporarily out of Olongapo before undergoing a tender availability alongside Buffalo in March. Then, following a stint of target and torpedo practice in the waters of Lingayen Gulf from 13 April to 25 May 1922, the destroyer enjoyed a five-day respite at Manila before she sailed for Shanghai, China, on 3 June and a drydocking in that port. Alden then sailed for Japanese waters, visiting the port of Yokohama.

Winding up her deployment in the Asiatic Fleet that summer, Alden sailed for the United States, and ultimately reached San Francisco, California on 2 October. She was decommissioned at San Diego, California on 24 January 1923.

==== 1930–1937 ====
Alden remained inactive through the rest of the 1920s, but was recommissioned at San Diego on 8 May 1930 and assigned to Destroyer Squadrons, Battle Fleet (later, Destroyers, Battle Force). As part of Destroyer Division 46 (DesDiv 46), and later as a unit of DesDiv 10, Alden was homeported at San Diego, with her home yard at Mare Island Navy Yard. She carried out regular underway training evolutions, with routine periods of upkeep in port over the next six years.

The training for each year culminated in the annual large-scale exercise, or fleet problems. Over the next few years, Alden participated in six of these. However, she did not participate in Fleet Problem XVII in the spring of 1936 due to DesDiv 10's undergoing two months' overhaul at the Mare Island Navy Yard. While Alden lay at Mare Island, Smith Thompson had suffered heavy damage in a collision with Whipple on 14 April, and, unfit for further service, had been struck on 19 May; Alden, chosen to replace Smith Thompson, sailed on 15 July for the Asiatic Station. Stopping briefly at Pearl Harbor, the ship paused at Wake Island and Guam, eventually arriving at Chefoo on 20 August.

Over the next six years, Alden, assigned initially to DesDiv 13, steamed north to China in the spring, spent the summer operating out of Chefoo, and returned to the Philippines in the fall for further exercises and upkeep at Cavite over the winter. She carried out this routine against a backdrop of rising Sino-Japanese tension. Hostility between these two Asiatic powers had flared and abated during the 1930s, and open warfare broke out in July 1937.

Since the Sino-Japanese hostilities seemed confined at the outset to North China, Admiral Harry E. Yarnell, Commander in Chief, Asiatic Fleet (CINCAF), had few reservations about carrying out a planned goodwill cruise to Vladivostok, USSR. Alden accompanied Paul Jones, Whipple and Barker to sea from their base at Chefoo, and rendezvoused with Augusta at the end of the afternoon watch on 25 July. Yarnell's ships reached Vladivostok on the morning of the 28th, and remained there until the afternoon of 1 August, in this first visit to a Russian port since the establishment of diplomatic relations with the Soviet Union in 1933. On the latter date, the destroyers sailed for Chefoo and Augusta for Tsingtao.

After hostilities broke out at Shanghai in mid-August, the ships of the Asiatic Fleet carried out a curtailed training schedule for the remainder of the summer and into the fall, chiefly standing by to assist Americans who might be affected. Alden eventually returned to the Philippines for the winter for upkeep and training..

==== SS President Hoover ====
Early on the morning of 11 December 1937, Dollar Steamship Lines' ocean liner SS President Hoover ran aground in a typhoon on Kasho-to, east of Formosa. Alden and Barker, then at Manila and Olongapo Naval Station respectively, were ordered to proceed immediately to assist. Due to the urgency of the situation, Alden sailed without her captain, Lieutenant Commander Stanley M. Haight, and several officers and men. A Grumman J2F Duck amphibious aircraft from the Asiatic Fleet's utility unit brought Haight out to Alden, rendezvoused with the ship and landed nearby. Sea conditions, however, precluded a boat's coming alongside the aircraft, for fear of damaging the plane's main float. Commander Haight seized the initiative and swam to one of his ship's 26-foot (7.9 m) motor whaleboats to be brought aboard his ship to resume command.

Alden resumed her voyage, struggling through heavy seas at only 12 knots (22 km/h). She eventually sighted Kasho-to at 1245 on 12 December and immediately requested permission from the captain of the Imperial Japanese Navy heavy cruiser Ashigara to enter Japanese territorial waters. Barker arrived soon afterwards, then an officer from Ashigara came aboard Alden to give his government's permission for the two destroyers to enter and assist President Hoover. By this time Hoover's 330 crew were most of the way through getting their 503 passengers and themselves ashore safely. However, a few of Hoover's crew had plundered the liner's liquor store, got drunk, and once ashore started pursuing some of the women passengers. Commander Haight, Ensign John H. Parker and 15 men boarded Hoover to protect valuables. Meanwhile, landing parties from both Alden and Barker went ashore to restore order.

On the forenoon watch on 14 December due to the tension after the sinking of Panay in the Yangtze River by Japanese aircraft on 12 December, Alden broke out and stowed in her ready racks 47 rounds of 4-inch (100 mm) service ammunition. However, Ashigara and her escort continued to stand by and assist in a professional manner. Hoover's survivors were rescued by American Mail Line's SS President McKinley on 14 December and Dollar Lines' SS President Pierce on 15 December. Ashigara deployed flat-bottomed boats that brought survivors from the shore out to meet McKinley's boats and a motor launch, which then ferried them out to the liner.

Anchoring west of Kasho-to, Alden remained to guard President Hoover's wreck until 23 December 1937, when Japanese authorities relieved her.

==== 1938–41 ====
The next summer, Alden, in company with her sister ships and Black Hawk, visited Haiphong, French Indochina, from 21 to 28 June 1938 before continuing up to Chefoo. With the start of World War II in September 1939, concern over the Japanese taking advantage of the preoccupation of the British and French with European affairs to extend her own sphere of influence prompted increased American vigilance to protect the lives and property of Americans in the Far East. To this end, some of the ships of the Asiatic Fleet's destroyers were rotated to duty with units such as the South China Patrol. Alden operated with this command between September and November 1939, before she returned to the Philippines.

The international climate making it dangerous to keep the Asiatic Fleet deployed to Chinese waters, Admiral Thomas C. Hart (who had relieved Admiral Yarnell as CINCAF in July 1939) withdrew it, with the exception of the river gunboats on the Yangtze and South China Patrols, to the Philippines in late 1940. There, in the waters of that archipelago, the fleet prepared for war. Alden took part in this training, interspersing it with periods of upkeep at Cavite, into the tense autumn of 1941.

Due to the continued "tense and unpredictable" situation in the Far East at that time, Admiral Hart desired to "obtain additional security from surprise attack" and reduce the possibility of the Japanese cutting off "certain of his surface forces" from British and Dutch bases in the event of war. To that end, on 24 November 1941, CINCAF ordered Task Force 5, formed around Marblehead, two destroyer divisions (57 and 58, the former including Alden) and Black Hawk, to the ports of Balikpapan and Tarakan Island, Borneo. Hart directed the detachment commanders to proceed to these ports for fuel, but to "have difficulty" in doing so, with a view toward lingering in those ports "for a protracted period if necessary."

Alden got underway on 25 November 1941, bound for Borneo, accompanying Black Hawk, and arrived at Balikpapan on the morning of the 30th. While she lay in that port, the British Admiral Thomas Spencer Vaughan Phillips, the newly designated Commander in Chief, Eastern Fleet, flew to Manila for conferences with Admiral Hart on 5–6 December. Phillips sought the loan of destroyers from the Asiatic Fleet to help screen his capital ships, but Hart, opining that the British already possessed adequate resources in that department, demurred. Intelligence information disclosing the movement of a Japanese convoy in the Gulf of Siam, however, changed Hart's mind, and as Admiral Phillips resolved to return to Singapore, CINCAF decided to transfer one division of destroyers.

Consequently, Alden and three sister ships, as well as Black Hawk, were soon directed to proceed to Batavia, Java, "for supplies and liberty." Soon after they departed Balikpapan, however, the destroyers received new sailing orders. They were to proceed instead to Singapore, where they were to join Phillips' force formed around Prince of Wales and Repulse.

=== World War II ===
==== 1941 ====
Alden was en route to her destination when, at 0300 on 8 December 1941, she received word that "war has been started by Japan." At Singapore, reports of a Japanese invasion convoy standing toward British Malaya compelled Admiral Phillips to act before his reinforcements could arrive, and he cleared Singapore on the evening of 8 December with Prince of Wales and Repulse, screened by four destroyers, to seek out the enemy.

Reaching Singapore on the morning of 10 December, Alden moored at 1113, and embarked a liaison party consisting of a Royal Navy lieutenant and four signalmen at 1130. She and her sister ships were still preparing for sea as Japanese high-level and torpedo bombers, flying from bases in Indochina, overwhelmed Prince of Wales and Repulse off Kuantan, Malaya, that afternoon and sank them both. Underway at 1509, Alden and her sister ships soon cleared Singapore, and stood toward the scene of the action in response to Admiral Phillips' desperate signal, sent early in the battle, for destroyer assistance. Accompanying British and Australian destroyers had already rescued the survivors from the two capital ships, however, and were retiring toward Singapore.

Alden and her division mates subsequently entered the waters in which the battle had taken place earlier that day, looking for survivors, but only sighted pieces of wreckage, eventually winding up the search effort during the mid-watch. En route back to Singapore, Alden noted a "probable submarine attack," at 0630 on 11 December, and Edsall left the formation to investigate the source of "torpedo wakes" but found nothing. Alden and her sister ships reached port later that morning; Alden mooring alongside RFA Francol at 1041 to replenish her fuel bunkers. While in port, she lowered her flag to half-mast in tribute to the men lost in Prince of Wales and Repulse. Alden remained at Singapore until the morning of the 14th when, after disembarking the Royal Navy liaison party, she got underway with the rest of the division for Surabaya, Java. She reached that Dutch port late on the afternoon of 15 December.

Underway on the 20th for Australian waters, Alden sailed for Port Darwin in the screen of Houston, breaking up the routine of the voyage by sending boarding parties to investigate and establish the friendly character of various small craft and ships sighted en route. She fell in with another formation of American ships moving to Australian waters, Pecos, Otus, and Gold Star, two days before Christmas, and fueled at sea from Pecos the same day. The destroyer ultimately saw her charges safely to Darwin, dropping anchor in that north Australian port at 13:05 on 28 December.

==== 1942 ====
Alden, soon reassigned to DesDiv 58, spent the next several weeks escorting troop and supply convoys in support of efforts to defend the Malay Barrier. During the course of one such evolution, she was in the Beagle Gulf 40 nautical miles (74 km; 46 mi) west of Darwin, Australia, on the morning of 20 January 1942 escorting the oiler USS Trinity (AO-13) with Edsall when the Imperial Japanese Navy submarine I-123 sighted Trinity heading toward Port Darwin. Misidentifying Trinity as a transport, I-123 fired four Type 89 torpedoes at Trinity at 12°05′30″S 130°05′36″E shortly after 0630. The sound man aboard I-123 reported hearing one torpedo hit Trinity, but in fact all four torpedoes missed, although Trinity sighted three of them and reported the attack. Alden immediately reversed course in the predawn darkness and searched for I-123, made sound contact, and conducted a brief depth charge attack at 06:41 before losing contact with I-123 and abandoning the search. I-123 escaped unscathed.

"Mindful of leaving (the) convoy unprotected" if she continued to seek out the submarine, Alden returned to her screening station and arrived at Port Darwin without further incident. At 1620 that afternoon, though, while she was taking on fuel from the tanker British Sailor, Alden received orders to accompany Edsall to the scene of the above attack. Underway at 1641, leaving a third of her crew behind to break out stores on board Black Hawk, Alden rushed to the scene, finding Deloraine already dropping depth charges.

Alden and Edsall patrolled one area in proximity of the submarine contact, while two Australian ships patrolled another. Alden developed a good contact early the following morning (21 January) and dropped six charges, with no result. A plane from Langley reported carrying out an attack on a submarine a short time later, and Alden steamed to the scene. Seeing oil still rising, she attacked, expending the rest of her depth charges in the tracks. Bringing up more charges from below, the destroyer carried out another attack soon afterward. Then, having expended her last charge, Alden returned to Port Darwin.

Edsall and the Australian ships, accompanied by a PBY Catalina, returned to the scene but were unable to locate the slick, last seen by Alden, because of a heavy rain squall in the vicinity. A short time later, it was determined that the victim of the earlier attack by Edsall and Deloraine was I-124, a large Japanese mine-laying submarine had laid 27 mines near Darwin that had already sunk three Allied merchantmen.

Clearing Darwin on 3 February, Alden sailed with a convoy, bound for Java. Fueling from Trinity en route, the destroyer reached Tjilatjap, on the south coast of Java, late on the afternoon of 10 February. Getting underway late the following day, Alden joined Paul Jones and Ban Hong Liong on the morning of 12 February, and convoyed the Briton to the port of Koepang, Timor. The convoy arrived on 16 February, with the destroyer returning to Tjilatjap three days later, after refueling from Pecos. The following day, the destroyer briefly patrolled off the harbor entrance, covering the sortie of Black Hawk.

As the Japanese neared Java, the American-British-Dutch-Australian (ABDA) forces began gathering for a show-down. As part of this movement, Alden cleared Tjilatjap on the morning of 22 February for Surabaya and, along with Paul Jones, screened Houston during the passage. The three ships arrived at their destination on the afternoon of the 24th.

Intelligence information indicating the possibility of a Japanese landing attempt in the vicinity, a mixed Dutch and American force (Houston, De Ruyter and Java), two Dutch and five American destroyers (including Alden), sortied after dark on 25 February and conducted a sweep off the northern coast of Madura Island. Not making any contact, the Allied force returned to Surabaya early the following morning.

Later that same day, 26 February, the commander of the striking force, Dutch Rear Admiral Karel Doorman, called a meeting of his commanders, and promulgated his plans to meet the Japanese. At 1922 on 26 February, the striking force, reinforced by the arrival of Perth, Exeter, and three British destroyers, got underway and stood out of Surabaya.

Doorman's force again swept along the north coast of Madura, but then, after having found the waters clear of enemy shipping, at 2212 on 26 February reversed course. During the early morning, the ABDA force continued past Surabaya, and shaped a course toward the entrance to the minefields at 1300 on 27 February. Fresh contact reports, however, indicated the presence of a Japanese force heading south from the vicinity of Bawean Island. At 1500, as Alden was about to enter the channel through the minefields, she observed De Ruyter reverse course and make a signal: "I am going to intercept an enemy unit...." The rest of the force followed, and stood toward the enemy.

At 1617, Alden observed gun flashes as the Japanese ships opened fire, answered shortly afterward by Houston, De Ruyter and Exeter. The American destroyers, Alden steaming second in column, took up their position on the disengaged side of the column of Allied cruisers, to Java's starboard quarter. "Straining every rivet" to keep up with the cruisers, Alden and her sister ships made all possible speed. At 1714, observers on board Alden noted Kortenaer take a torpedo which broke her in two. Soon afterward the Allied fleet changed course twice, in disarray due to the accurate enemy gunfire and the threat posed by his superior torpedoes. The shell-damaged Exeter veered out of the Allied battle line; to cover her retirement, Alden and her sister ships laid smoke.

After he had made one order to counterattack with torpedoes and canceled it, Rear Admiral Doorman again ordered the destroyers to counterattack. On Alden’s bridge, a man remarked: "I always knew these old four pipers would have to go in and save the day...". All within earshot laughed, and the comment broke the tension as the American destroyers, the oldest ships in the ABDA line, steered a course toward the Japanese and launched torpedoes from their starboard tubes at 1822. Then, following the movements of John D. Edwards ahead, Alden reversed course and loosed her port "fish" at 1827. Alden's captain, Lieutenant Commander L. E. Coley, firmly believed that the American destroyers' attack saved Exeter from destruction at that time.

Poor visibility and the increasing range soon ended that phase of the battle, and the Allied force retired, Japanese scoutplanes occasionally dropping flares above the Allied ships. At 1958, the cruiser column turned to westward where, before the night was over, De Ruyter and Java would be sunk, and Houston and Perth forced to flee. Alden and her sisters turned eastward, to retire independently toward Surabaya, their torpedo stocks exhausted. Entering the minefields at 2230, the American destroyermen anchored their ships at 0210 on 28 February.

Alden remained there throughout the daylight hours. She fueled at Holland Pier and anchored in the harbor, where she observed two waves of enemy high-altitude bombers carry out raids that afternoon. That afternoon, Commander Coley noted carrier-type aircraft overhead, indicating that "enemy air activity" would soon be on the increase.

"It seemed that our best chance of getting through to an allied base," Coley wrote later, "was to evade the enemy and trust to the reduced visibility of night to get out of range of enemy aircraft." Given permission to clear out as the noose around Java tightened, and to proceed to Exmouth Gulf, Australia, the four destroyers of DesDiv 58 sortied that night, clearing the minefield an hour before midnight on 28 February, their crews at general quarters. Alden and the others steamed as close to the Javan shore as they dared, hugging the coast, and turned, undetected, into Bali Strait. There, however, they soon encountered the Bali Attack Unit consisting of Hatsuharu, Nenohi, Wakaba, and Hatsushimo.

Around 0215, Alden spotted one destroyer almost due east of her, followed by two or more a short time later. Emerging from the coastal waters to clear a reef, the Americans apparently came into the enemy's sight soon afterwards, since gunfire erupted from the Japanese ships within 15 minutes' time. A five-minute running gun duel ensued between the two groups of destroyers before Alden and her sister ships checked fire and laid smoke. At a range of about 12 miles (19 km), the Japanese opened up again at 0250. The Americans, however, held their fire, reasoning that the enemy sought to force them into revealing their position by firing back.

Continuing on at 28 knots (52 km/h), the four "four-pipers" emerged from the encounter unscathed. As they neared their destination, Commander Thomas H. Binford, Commander, DesDiv 58, paired his ships, the ones with Australian charts (Alden and Paul Jones), with those which did not (John D. Ford and John D. Edwards), and the destroyermen reached Fremantle on the afternoon of 4 March.

Reporting to Commander, Australia-New Zealand area, on 28 March, Alden operated in the waters of the Southwest Pacific until sailing for Pearl Harbor, reaching her destination on 7 June en route to the United States West Coast. Following an overhaul at Mare Island, Alden commenced convoy escort duty between San Francisco and Hawaiian waters on 11 August.

==== 1943 ====
Over the next eight months, Alden carried out prosaic escort duty until she departed Mare Island on 9 April 1943 for the Caribbean. Transiting the Panama Canal on 16 April and reporting that day to Commander, Caribbean Sea Frontier, she continued on to Trinidad, arriving there on 25 April.

The destroyer spent the next two months shuttling convoys between Trinidad and Guantanamo Bay, before she proceeded north to the New York Navy Yard, which she entered on 28 June for repairs and alterations. Upon completion of this availability, Alden sailed for Norfolk, Virginia on 11 July, and joined a Morocco-bound convoy soon afterwards, reaching Casablanca on 28 July. After returning to the United States via Gibraltar, the ship entered the Charleston Navy Yard for a drydocking on 27 August. She sailed for Port of Spain, Trinidad, on 7 September and ultimately proceeded to Brazilian waters, reaching Recife on 8 October.

Underway for the Caribbean on 4 November, Alden reached Trinidad ten days later, and sailed on 26 November as escort for the Army transport George Washington. Seeing that ship safely to her destination, Key West, Florida on 1 December, the destroyer proceeded to Charleston, arriving there on the 3rd for upkeep. She steamed from there to Casco Bay, Maine, and refresher training, before she headed back to Norfolk, arriving at that port on the last day of the year 1943.

==== 1944 ====
Alden sailed for North African waters on 5 January 1944, in an antisubmarine group formed around Guadalcanal. On 16 January, a pair of Grumman TBF Avengers from Guadalcanal's Composite Squadron 13 (VC-13) caught a pair of U-boats on the surface, rendezvousing near the Azores, and attacked, sinking U-544 before she could transfer radar detection gear to U-129. Reaching Casablanca on 26 January, the task unit sailed for the United States three days later, and reached Norfolk on 16 February. Shifting to the Boston Navy Yard for repairs and alterations soon afterwards, Alden returned to Norfolk on 12 March.

The destroyer sailed the following day for Tunisia as one of the 16 escort vessels shepherding convoy UGS-36, 72 merchantmen and 18 tank landing ships. Escort vessels drove off what was believed to be a U-boat late on 31 March, and six hours later, early on 1 April, 22 German aircraft attacked UGS-36. Alden, in the rear guard, aided the defense of the convoy, as the escorts shot down two enemy aircraft and probably damaged two others. Ultimately, UGS-36 reached its destination, Bizerte, on 3 April. Nine days later, Alden sailed for the United States, reaching Hampton Roads on 1 May.

Following a brief availability at the Boston Navy Yard, Alden departed Boston, Massachusetts on 27 May for New York, reporting for duty under Commander, Service Force, Atlantic Fleet, soon after. She then operated out of Norfolk during June, principally on local escort duty. During this time, she screened Wisconsin during a phase of that new battleship's shakedown training.

Following emergency repairs to a damaged propeller, Alden resumed escort operations, this time with Elokomin, as she convoyed the ship from Norfolk to Baytown to Galveston, thence to Guantanamo Bay and back to Galveston, before she escorted the oiler on a trip from Galveston to Bermuda, Casco Bay and Norfolk.

Undergoing routine maintenance at the Norfolk Navy Yard upon conclusion of this duty in August 1944, Alden escorted Chicopee from Norfolk to Bermuda before the destroyer then convoyed Adair and Mount Hood from Norfolk to the Canal Zone. Relieving John D. Edwards under the auspices of Commander, Panama Sea Frontier, Alden operated in Panama waters as a training ship with submarines into November, after which time the destroyer returned to Norfolk.

==== 1945 ====
After she had suffered damage in a collision with Hayter on 31 January 1945, Alden underwent repairs in the Norfolk Navy Yard. These ended on 28 February, Alden emerged from the yard soon afterwards and joined the escort of a Mediterranean-bound convoy, UGF-21, on 1 March. Subsequently, returning to the United States with convoy GUF-21, the warship escorted Mattaponi between Bermuda and Guantanamo, and Chiwawa between Guantanamo and Bermuda before the destroyer returned to Norfolk. Then, following tender availability at Tompkinsville, Alden sailed for Mayport, Florida, on 2 June, where, upon her arrival, she was assigned plane guard duty with Guadalcanal, the ship assigned to conduct carrier qualifications for fledgling pilots out of the Naval Air Station at Pensacola, Florida. Completing this tour on 13 June, she proceeded thence to the Delaware capes.

== Decommissioning and fate ==
Alden reached the Philadelphia Naval Shipyard on 15 June 1945 and was decommissioned there on 15 July. Her name was struck from the Naval Vessel Register on 13 August, and the ship was sold to the Boston Metals Salvage Company, of Baltimore, Maryland, on 30 November 1945, to be broken up for scrap.

== Awards ==
Alden was awarded three battle stars for her World War II service.
