= Japanese destroyer Nenohi =

Two Japanese destroyers have been named Nenohi:

- Japanese destroyer Nenohi (1905), a Kamikaze-class destroyer launched in 1905 and stricken in 1928
- Japanese destroyer Nenohi (1932), a Hatsuharu-class destroyer launched in 1932 and sunk in 1942
