= USS Whipple (DD-217) =

Clemson-class destroyer

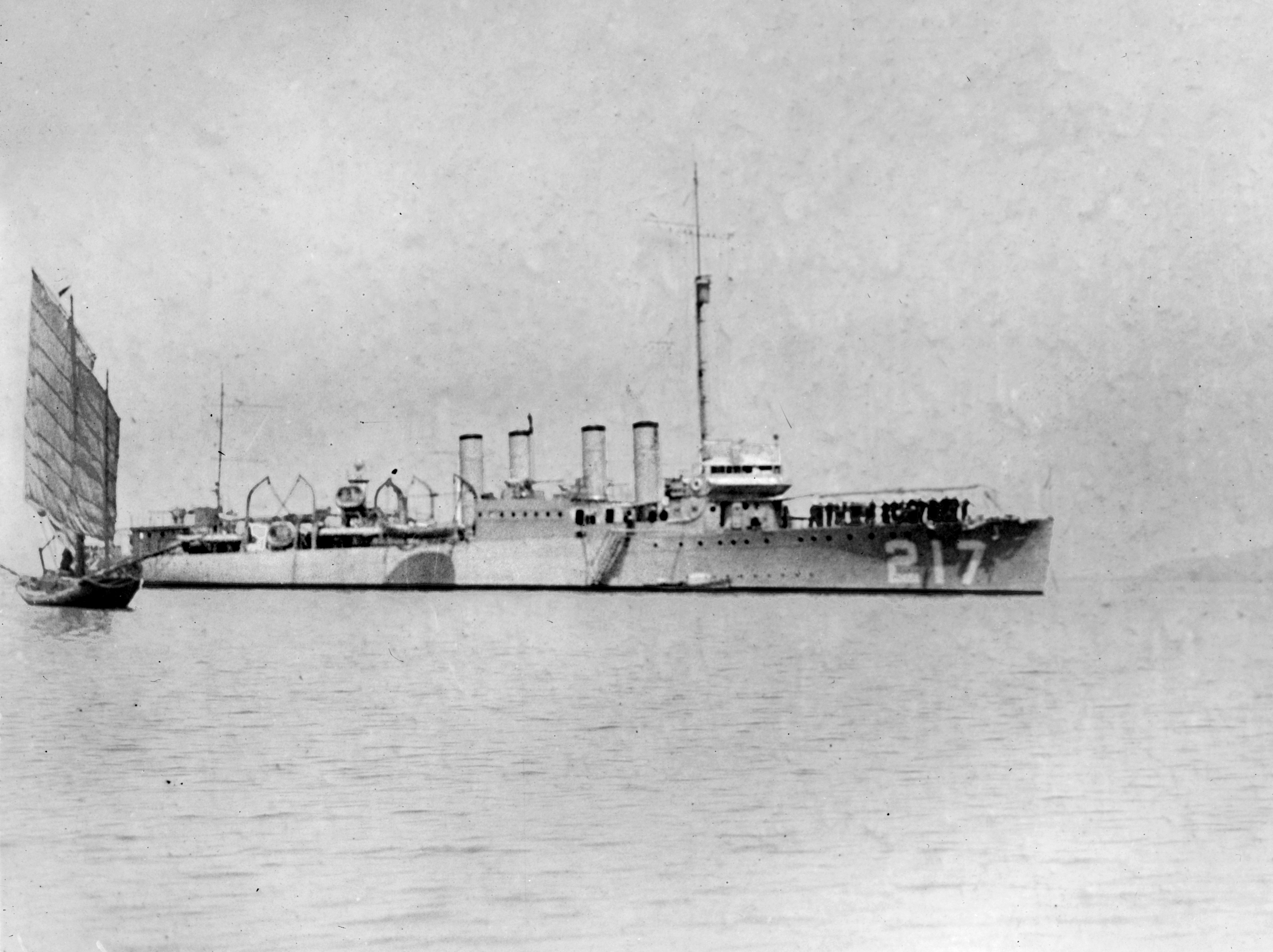
- USS Whipple circa 1921

History

United States
- Name: Whipple
- Namesake: Abraham Whipple
- Builder: William Cramp & Sons, Philadelphia
- Yard number: 483
- Laid down: 12 June 1919
- Launched: 6 November 1919
- Commissioned: 23 April 1920
- Decommissioned: 9 November 1945
- Stricken: 5 December 1945
- Fate: Sold for scrap, 30 September 1947

General characteristics
- Class & type: Clemson-class destroyer
- Displacement: 1,308 tons
- Length: 314 ft 4 in (95.81 m)
- Beam: 30 ft 11 1/2 in (9.436 m)
- Draft: 9 ft 4 in (2.84 m)
- Propulsion: 26,500 shp (19,800 kW); geared turbines, 2 screws
- Speed: 35 knots (65 km/h; 40 mph)
- Complement: 101 officers and enlisted
- Armament: 4 × 4 in (102 mm) guns; 1 × 3 in (76 mm) gun; 2 × .30 cal (7.62 mm) machine guns; 12 × 21 in (533 mm) torpedo tubes

USS Whipple (DD- 217/AG-117), a Clemson-class destroyer was the second ship of the United States Navy named in honor of Commodore Abraham Whipple (1733–1819), who served in the Continental Navy.

== Construction and commissioning ==
Whipple was laid down on 12 June and launched on 6 November 1919 from William Cramp & Sons; sponsored by Mrs. Gladys V. Mulvey, great-great-great-granddaughter of Abraham Whipple; and commissioned on 23 April 1920.

== Service history ==
=== 1920 to World War II ===
Following shakedown training out of Guantanamo Bay, Cuba, Whipple returned to Philadelphia for post-shakedown availability. The destroyer sailed for the Near East on 29 May 1920 and arrived at Constantinople (renamed Istanbul in 1923), Turkey, on 13 June. For the next eight months, she operated in the region of the Black Sea and eastern Mediterranean, under the overall command of Admiral Mark L. Bristol, Commander, U.S. Naval Detachment in Near Eastern Waters. At this time, the entire Near East was in turmoil due to changes caused by, and in the wake of, World War I.

Whipple delivered mail to the destroyer Chandler at Samsun, Turkey, on 16 June and landed British American Tobacco company representatives whom the destroyer had transported from Constantinople. She next visited Sevastopol, in the Russian Crimea, and Constanţa, Romania. Unexpectedly ordered to Batum, Georgia, Whipple departed Samsun on 6 July and made 30 knots (56 km/h; 35 mph) to reach her destination the next day. There, she attended the peaceful transfer of the city to Georgia's control from British troops, which had been stationed there since the end of World War I.

Whipple then shifted south for a brief cruise along the Levantine coast during which she visited Beirut and Damascus, Syria and Port Said, Egypt, before she returned to Constantinople on 18 August. While she was making this cruise, the sweeping Navy-wide designation of hull numbers took place and Whipple was classified as DD-217 on 17 July 1920. The destroyer next resumed her previous routine on the Black Sea route, carrying mail between ports (including dispatches for consulates and the like), and observing conditions prevailing at the ports visited in Romania, Russia, and Asiatic Turkey.

While underway on 19 October, Whipple sighted distress signals from Greek steamer Thetis and proceeded to the stricken vessel's assistance, as she lay aground off Constanţa. After 10 hours, the destroyer succeeded in freeing Thetis from her predicament and earned a commendation from her division commander. The citation lauded Lieutenant Commander Bernard's display of initiative and his excellent handling of the ship in shoal waters with a heavy sea running. "The whole affair," the citation concluded, "... reflected great credit on the Whipple and the United States Naval Service."

In the meantime, while Whipple conducted her patrols, the situation in the Russian Civil War was changing. Whipple convoyed the disabled American steamer SS Haddon into Constantinople and later fueled at Constanţa where she learned that Russian Bolshevik troops were approaching the Crimea. Baron General Pyotr Wrangel, commanding the White Russian forces in the area, pulled his force back to Sevastopol in a rear-guard action, from where the Whites evacuated to sea in a wide variety of craft to escape the oncoming Bolshevik forces.

Whipple arrived at Sevastopol on the morning of 14 November and reported to Vice Admiral Newton A. McCully for orders. Hundreds of boats were present in the harbor, often crammed to the gunwales with evacuating White Russians. In addition to Whipple, cruiser St. Louis and two destroyers, Overton and Humphreys, stood by to evacuate selected individuals bearing passes from Admiral McCully.

During the entire time Whipple remained at Sevastopol, her main battery was trained out and manned. Armed boat crews carried evacuees out to the ship while her landing force stood in readiness. As her last boatload pushed off from shore, Bolshevik troops reached the main square and began firing on the fleeing White Russians; Whipple had completed the mission just in time.

Whipple then towed a barge loaded with wounded White Russian troops out of range of the Bolshevik guns and then turned the tow over to Humphreys. As Whipple passed Overton, McCully, on the latter's bridge, called out by megaphone "well done, Whipple." The last American vessel out of Sevastopol, the destroyer headed for Constantinople with her passengers, both topside and below decks. Each carried very few belongings, had no food, and possessed very little money. Many were sick or wounded.

After disembarking the refugees at Constantinople, Whipple resumed her station ship and mail carrying duties with the Near Eastern Naval Detachment and continued the task through the end of 1920 and into the spring of 1921. On 2 May 1921, the destroyer, along with her division mates, sailed for the Far East, transiting the Suez Canal and called at Bombay, India; Colombo, Ceylon; Batavia, Java; Singapore, Straits Settlements; and Saigon, French Indochina. She arrived at her new home port, Cavite, Philippine Islands, near Manila, on 29 June. For the next four years, the destroyer served in the Asiatic Fleet, "showing the flag" and standing ready to protect American lives and property in strife-torn China. She operated out of Cavite in the winter months, conducting tactical exercises in the Philippines until heading north to North China ports in the spring for summer operations out of Tsingtao.

Warfare between local warlords around Shanghai in late 1924 and early 1925 resulted in Whipple's being called upon to serve as a transport. On 15 January 1925, the Marine Detachment from Sacramento went ashore to protect American property, while about the same time, an expeditionary force of Marines, led by Captain James P. Schwerin, USMC, embarked in Whipple, Borie, and Barker. The three destroyers landed the Marines on 22 January, relieving the 28-man detachment from the gunboat at that time.

On 18 May 1925, Whipple and her division sailed for the United States, via Guam, Midway, and Pearl Harbor, and arrived at San Diego on 17 June. Five days later, the ship got underway for the United States East Coast; and she arrived at Norfolk on 17 July. She next operated off the U.S. East Coast from Maine to Florida and cruised to Guantanamo Bay for maneuvers with the Fleet. During this time, Whipple put ashore a landing force in Nicaragua to protect American lives and property threatened by the banditry and unrest. On four separate instances, in late 1926 and early 1927, a landing party from the destroyer served on shore, earning the ship the Second Nicaraguan Campaign Medal.

Whipple departed Norfolk on 26 May 1927 to begin a cruise with her division to northern European ports. She then steamed south for a brief tour in the Mediterranean before departing Gibraltar on 29 January 1928 and heading for Cuba. She conducted operations in the Caribbean out of Guantanamo Bay, until 26 March when she set course for the United States West Coast. She operated in the Pacific out of the Destroyer Base at San Diego, California, until 1 August 1929. Whipple departed the U.S. West Coast, bound for the Asiatic Station and her second tour with the Asiatic Fleet.

Whipple spent the next decade with the Asiatic Fleet, watching the rising ascendancy of Japan over China and the Far East. She resumed the routine common to ships of her type with the Fleet: winter exercises in the Philippine Islands and summer maneuvers out of Tsingtao, China, with cruises to Chinese coastal ports in the interim. On 8 February 1932 she collided with the British steamer Rosalie Moller in the Yangtze at Shanghai, China, and suffered severe damage.

While on exercises in Subic Bay during the spring of 1936, Whipple and the destroyer Smith Thompson collided on 14 April. The latter suffered such serious damage in the accident that she had to be scrapped. As a consequence, Whipple, whose own bow had been bent around until it faced sternward, received Smith Thompson's undamaged bow and soon reentered active service.

Meanwhile, tension between China and Japan continued to worsen, particularly in North China. These long-simmering antagonisms erupted in open fighting near Peking on 7 July 1937, which soon became an all-out war in the vicinity. Two weeks later, a small squadron of Asiatic Fleet units, including Whipple, sailed from Chefoo on 24 July. The destroyer, in company with Alden, Barker, and Paul Jones, rendezvoused with Augusta on the 25th, en route to the coast of Siberia. The five ships arrived at Vladivostok, USSR, on the 28th.

The visit, the first by American men-of-war since the establishment of diplomatic relations with the Soviet Union in 1933, lasted until 1 August when the five ships headed back to China. Within the next fortnight, while the Fleet continued its routine, hostilities broke out between Chinese and Japanese forces at Shanghai, and the Second Sino-Japanese War entered a new phase.

The Fleet continued its mission of observing the conflict, standing ready to evacuate Americans from Chinese ports should the occasion arise. By mid-1938, when the war had moved inland and up the Yangtze, the Fleet resumed its former routine. Whipple and her division mates, in company with Black Hawk, visited Bangkok, Siam, in June 1938.

The Japanese captured most of the major coastal cities and ports and those along the lower Yangtze, and opportunities for trouble multiplied for the western nations still trying to maintain their interests in China. In the spring of 1939, one such occasion came at Amoy, China, where a Chinese gunman shot a Japanese citizen. The Japanese responded by landing Special Naval Landing Force personnel near the International Settlement of Koolangsu. The British and Americans did likewise, landing bluejackets from Marblehead and the British light cruiser Birmingham. By September 1939, Whipple was serving as station ship at Amoy, her landing force ashore and Captain John T. G. Stapler, Commander, South China Patrol, embarked on board.

At 2355 on 3 September 1939, Whipple's deck log noted that France had declared war on Germany, two days after German troops invaded Poland. World War II had begun in Europe, substantially altering the balance of power in the Orient as Britain pulled out much of her China Station fleet to bolster the Home and Mediterranean Fleets. Whipple operated on neutrality patrol off the Philippines into 1941, as Admiral Thomas C. Hart prepared the small Asiatic Fleet for war.

=== World War II ===
On 25 November 1941, two days in advance of the "war warning" which predicted that hostile Japanese action in the Pacific Ocean was imminent, Admiral Hart dispatched Destroyer Division (DesDiv) 57 (Whipple, USS Alden, USS John D. Edwards and USS Edsall) with the destroyer tender USS Black Hawk, to Balikpapan, Borneo, to disperse the surface ships of his fleet from their vulnerable position in Manila Bay.

Originally slated to join a British force based around the battleship HMS Prince of Wales and the battlecruiser HMS Repulse, Whipple's mission was aborted when Japanese land-based torpedo planes and high-level bombers sank both of these capital ships in the South China Sea off Kuantan, Malaya, on 10 December. Whipple arrived at Singapore on 11 December and departed on 14 December, bound for the Netherlands East Indies.

Fighting a desperate rearguard action in the face of a swift-moving and well-organized enemy, the American-British-Dutch-Australian Command (ABDA) force faced formidable obstacles as they withdrew to the "Malay Barrier." During this time, Whipple conducted escort and patrol duties into February 1942. On 12 February, the destroyer got underway from Prigi Bay, Java, in a dense fog. As she headed for Tjilatjap, on the south coast of Java, she was struck a glancing blow by the Royal Netherlands Navy light cruiser De Ruyter. As the Dutch ship emerged from the murk, Whipple alertly swung left to avoid a collision, a move that averted more serious damage. Drydocked at Tjilatjap on 13 February, Whipple ascertained the damage to be minor and rejoined the fleet for active service.

At 1640 on 26 February, Whipple and sister ship Edsall departed Tjilatjap to rendezvous with the seaplane tender Langley off the south coast of Java. Making contact with her at 0629 on 27 February, the destroyers took up screening positions to escort the vulnerable ship and its vital cargo of 32 P-40 fighters and U.S. Army Air Force (USAAF) personnel to Tjilatjap. At 1150, lookouts spotted nine Japanese high-level bombers approaching from the east. Four minutes later, a stick of bombs splashed around Langley, which was clearly the focus of Japanese attention. During a second attack shortly after noon, the three warships put up brisk antiaircraft fire.

Langley's evasive maneuvers were not sufficient to prevent the Japanese hitting her with several bombs at 1212, setting the former aircraft carrier on fire and causing flooding.

Whipple broke off firing at 1224 as the attackers veered away in a northeasterly direction. She and Edsall approached Langley to assist, and shortly thereafter, four Japanese fighter planes dove on them, but were driven off with one plane damaged by antiaircraft fire.

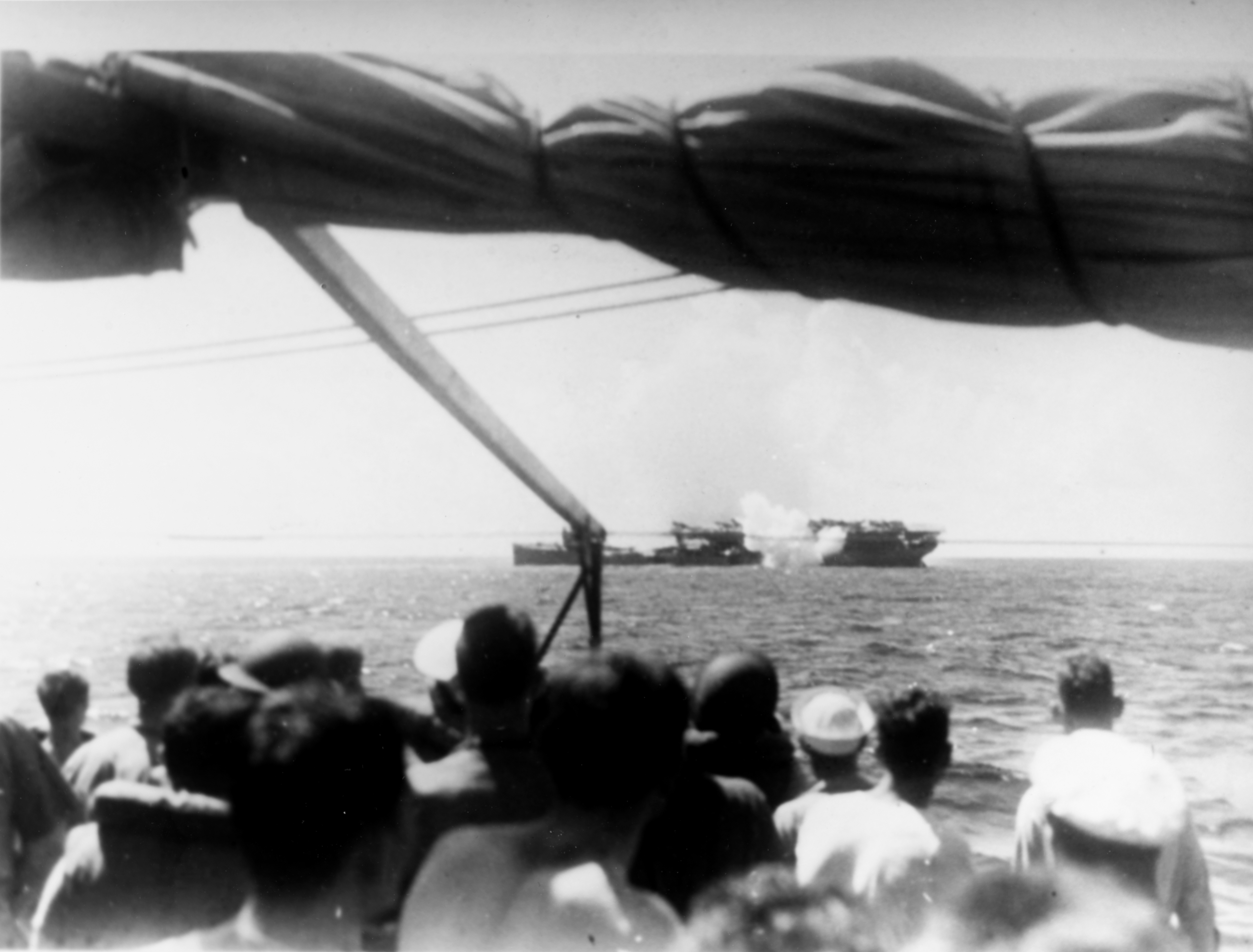
A torpedo from Whipple striking USS Langley.

Langley was so severely damaged that her captain gave the order to abandon ship at 1325, and Whipple came alongside to rescue survivors, using two of the destroyer's life rafts, a cargo net slung over the side, and a number of lines trailed over the side. Whipple picked up 308 men from Langley's crew and passengers while Edsall picked up 177 survivors. At 1358, the rescue completed, Whipple stood off to scuttle Langley, opening fire at 1429 with her 4-inch main battery. After nine rounds of 4-inch and two torpedoes, Langley settled lower and lower but refused stubbornly to sink. Soon, orders arrived directing Whipple and Edsall to clear the area prior to any more bombing attacks.

Both destroyers departed the area and subsequently rendezvoused with the oiler Pecos off Christmas Island to transfer the Langley survivors to the oiler. At 1020 on 27 February, three Japanese twin-engined bombers attacked Christmas Island. One singled out Whipple and dropped a stick of bombs which missed the rapidly dodging destroyer. The three ships headed south to get out of Japanese land-based aircraft range and completed transferring the survivors to On 28 February, Whipple began transferring Langley crew members to Pecos, completing the task by 0800 on 1 March. While one destroyer transferred personnel, the other circled and maintained an antisubmarine screen. When the transfer was completed, the two destroyers parted company with the oiler. Changing course in anticipation of orders to retire from Java, Whipple prepared to send a message relative to these orders when the destroyer's chief radioman heard a call for help over the radio from Pecos, then under attack by Japanese bombers near Christmas Island.

Whipple sped to the scene to render assistance if possible. Throughout the afternoon, as the destroyer closed the oiler, all hands on board prepared knotted lines and cargo nets for use in picking up survivors. Whipple went to general quarters at 1922 when she sighted several small lights off both bows.

Whipple slowly closed and began picking up survivors of Pecos. After interrupting the proceedings to conduct an unsuccessful attack on a submarine thought to be nearby, she returned to the task and continued the search until she had received 231 men from the oiler. Whipple soon cleared the area, believing that a Japanese aircraft carrier was close. Within a few days, Java fell to the Japanese who were gradually consolidating their expanding "Greater East Asia Co-Prosperity Sphere." Whipple joined what remained of the Asiatic Fleet in Australian waters.

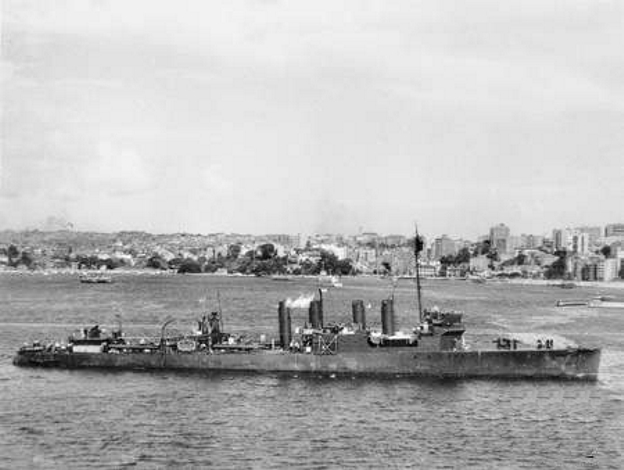
USS Whipple at Sydney, 1942.

Subsequently, sailing to Melbourne, Australia, and arriving on 23 March, Whipple operated with Australian and New Zealand Navy warships on convoy escort duties along the Great Barrier Reef until 2 May. She departed Sydney on that day, bound for the New Hebrides Islands, American Samoa and Hawaii, arriving at Pearl Harbor on 6 June. Together with sister ship Alden, Whipple departed Pearl Harbor on 8 June for San Francisco, escorting an eastward-bound convoy to the U.S. west coast, arriving on the 18th.

During a yard availability at Mare Island Naval Shipyard, the destroyer's topside weight was cut down as 20-millimeter antiaircraft guns replaced two banks of her torpedo tubes. Thus modified for convoy escort work, Whipple put to sea to commence the first of seven round-trip convoy escort missions from the U.S. west coast to Hawaii which lasted into the spring of 1943.

Standing out of San Francisco Bay on 11 May 1943, Whipple sailed for the Caribbean with a convoy routed through the Panama Canal for Santa Anna Bay, Curaçao, Netherlands West Indies. After the cargo ships loaded a petroleum cargo, the convoy pushed on for Cuba and arrived at Guantanamo Bay on 29 May. From Guantanamo, the destroyer escorted a convoy to Trinidad but returned to the Cuban base on 19 June before heading north to the New York Navy Yard for voyage repairs.

Later departing New York on 10 July, Whipple escorted a group of ships which rendezvoused with a convoy bound for Casablanca, French Morocco, and Gibraltar. Returning to Charleston, South Carolina, on 27 August, the destroyer put to sea on 7 September as a unit in a slow tow convoy bound via the Caribbean Sea to Recife, Brazil. Whipple headed north soon thereafter, guarding a convoy to Trinidad, and then up the eastern seaboard to Charleston, making port on 19 November.

After another convoy escort run from Norfolk to Guantanamo Bay and the Panama Canal Zone, Whipple joined three other destroyers in completing the offensive antisubmarine task group based around the escort carrier USS Guadalcanal. Departing Norfolk on 5 January 1944, the group went to sea to hunt German U-boats active in the Atlantic Ocean.

On 16 January, aircraft from Guadalcanal sighted three U-boats on the surface, fueling, some 300 miles off Flores Island. Carrier-based Avengers attacked the group and sank U-544 in the ensuing attack. After replenishing at Casablanca, the group returned to the high seas and searched convoy lanes for signs of German submarines until arriving at Norfolk on 16 February. Detached from the antisubmarine group soon thereafter, Whipple underwent voyage repairs at the Boston Navy Yard. On 13 March, the destroyer departed the U.S. east coast in company with Convoy UGS-36, bound for the Mediterranean Sea.

In the early morning darkness of 1 April, German planes - Dornier Do 217s and Junkers Ju 88s - came in low and fast to attack the convoy. Keeping up a heavy fire with her 20-millimeter batteries, Whipple sent up a substantial part of the heavy barrage which drove off the 30 German planes and saved the convoy from substantial damage. Arriving at Bizerte, Tunisia, on 3 April, the destroyer subsequently returned to Norfolk on 30 April.

For the remainder of 1944 and into the spring of 1945, Whipple performed convoy escort duties off the U.S. east coast, across the Atlantic Ocean to Casablanca, and occasionally into the Caribbean Sea. She was commanded by Captain Richard N. Reeves (USNR).

=== Post-World War II ===
Arriving at New London, Connecticut, on 6 June 1945, Whipple was redesignated an auxiliary, AG-117. After acting as a target ship for submarines off New London, the erstwhile destroyer entered the New York Navy Yard on 9 July for conversion to a high-speed target vessel.

On 5 August, Whipple departed New York for duty in the Pacific. Transiting the Panama Canal, the target ship proceeded via San Diego to Hawaii and arrived at Pearl Harbor on 30 August. She subsequently served as a target vessel for submarines of the Pacific training command until 21 September.

The need for her services no longer required, Whipple departed Pearl Harbor and proceeded to the U.S. East Coast, arriving at Philadelphia on 18 October. She was decommissioned on 9 November 1945, and her name was struck from the Navy list on 5 December. Stripped for scrap, the hulk was sold on 30 September 1947 to the Northern Metals Company of Philadelphia.

== Awards ==
Whipple received two battle stars for her World War II service.
