= Japanese destroyer Hatsushimo (1933) =

Hatsuharu-class destroyer

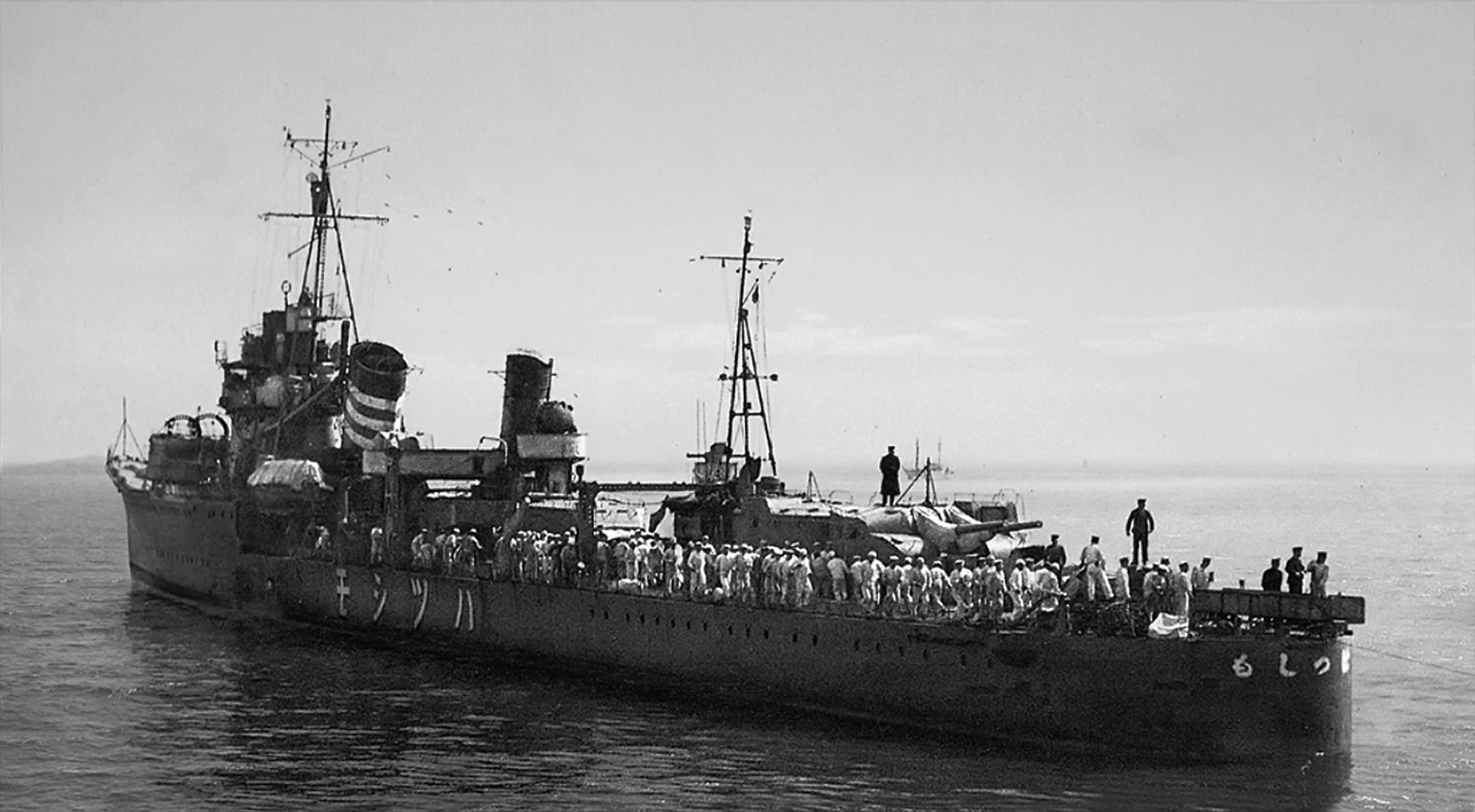
- Hatsushimo anchored in Qingdao, 28 March 1939

History

Empire of Japan
- Name: Hatsushimo
- Ordered: 1931 Fiscal Year
- Builder: Uraga Dock Company
- Laid down: 31 January 1933
- Launched: 4 November 1933
- Commissioned: 27 September 1934
- Stricken: 30 September 1945
- Fate: Mined and run aground, 30 July 1945. Scrapped, 31 November 1948

General characteristics
- Class & type: Hatsuharu-class destroyer
- Displacement: 1,802 long tons (1,831 t)
- Length: 103.5 m (340 ft) pp, 105.5 m (346 ft) waterline; 109.5 m (359 ft) overall
- Beam: 10 m (32 ft 10 in)
- Draught: 3 m (9 ft 10 in)
- Propulsion: 2 shaft Kampon geared turbines; 3 boilers, 42,000 hp (31,000 kW)
- Speed: 36 knots (41 mph; 67 km/h)
- Range: 4,000 nmi (7,400 km) at 14 kn (26 km/h)
- Complement: 200
- Armament: (as built) 2 × 2, 1 × 1 - 12.7 cm/50 Type 3 naval gun; 2 × 1 - 40 mm AA guns; 3 × 3 - 61 cm (24 in) torpedo tubes; 18 × depth charges

Service record
- Operations: Second Sino-Japanese War; Invasion of French Indochina; Aleutians campaign; Battle of Leyte Gulf; Operation Ten Go
- Victories: HNLMS Siaoe

Hatsushimo (初霜, ”First Frost”) was the fourth of six Hatsuharu-class destroyers, built for the Imperial Japanese Navy under the Circle One Program (Maru Ichi Keikaku). Three were laid down in JFY 1931 and the next three in JFY 1933. The remaining six ships in the plan were built as the Shiratsuyu class.

== History ==
Construction of the advanced Hatsuharu-class destroyers was intended to give the Imperial Japanese Navy smaller and more economical destroyers than the previous Fubuki and Akatsuki-class destroyers, but with essentially the same weaponry. These conflicting goals proved beyond contemporary destroyer design, and the resulting ships were top-heavy design, with severe stability problems and with inherent structural weaknesses. After the "Tomozuru Incident" of 1934 and "IJN 4th Fleet Incident" in 1935, Wakaba underwent extensive modifications on completion to remedy these issues.

The Hatsuharu-class destroyers used the same 50 caliber 12.7 cm gun as the Fubuki class, but all turrets could elevate to 75° to give the main guns a minimal ability to engage aircraft. During the war the single turret was removed on all surviving ships after 1942. The only anti-aircraft guns were two water-cooled, license-built Vickers 40 mm (1.6 in) (pom pom). These guns were deemed to be too heavy, slow-firing and short-ranged and were replaced by license-built French Hotchkiss 25 mm (0.98 in) Type 96 anti-aircraft guns in single, double and triple mounts from 1943 for the surviving ships. These powered mounts were still unsatisfactory because their traverse and elevation speeds were too slow to engage high-speed aircraft and more single mounts were fitted to ships in the last year of the war.

The 61 cm Type 90 torpedo was mounted in triple tube Type 90 Model 2 launchers It was traversed by an electro-hydraulic system and could traverse 360° in twenty-five seconds. If the backup manual system was used the time required increased to two minutes. Each tube could be reloaded in twenty-three seconds using the endless wire and winch provided. Hatsushimo was laid down on 31 January 1933, launched on 4 November 1933 and commissioned on 27 September 1934.

== Operational history ==
On completion, Hatsushimo was assigned to the IJN 2nd Fleet. During the Second Sino-Japanese War, from 1937, Hatsushimo covered landing of Japanese forces in Shanghai and Hangzhou. From 1940, she was assigned to patrol and cover landings of Japanese forces in south China, and participated in the Invasion of French Indochina.

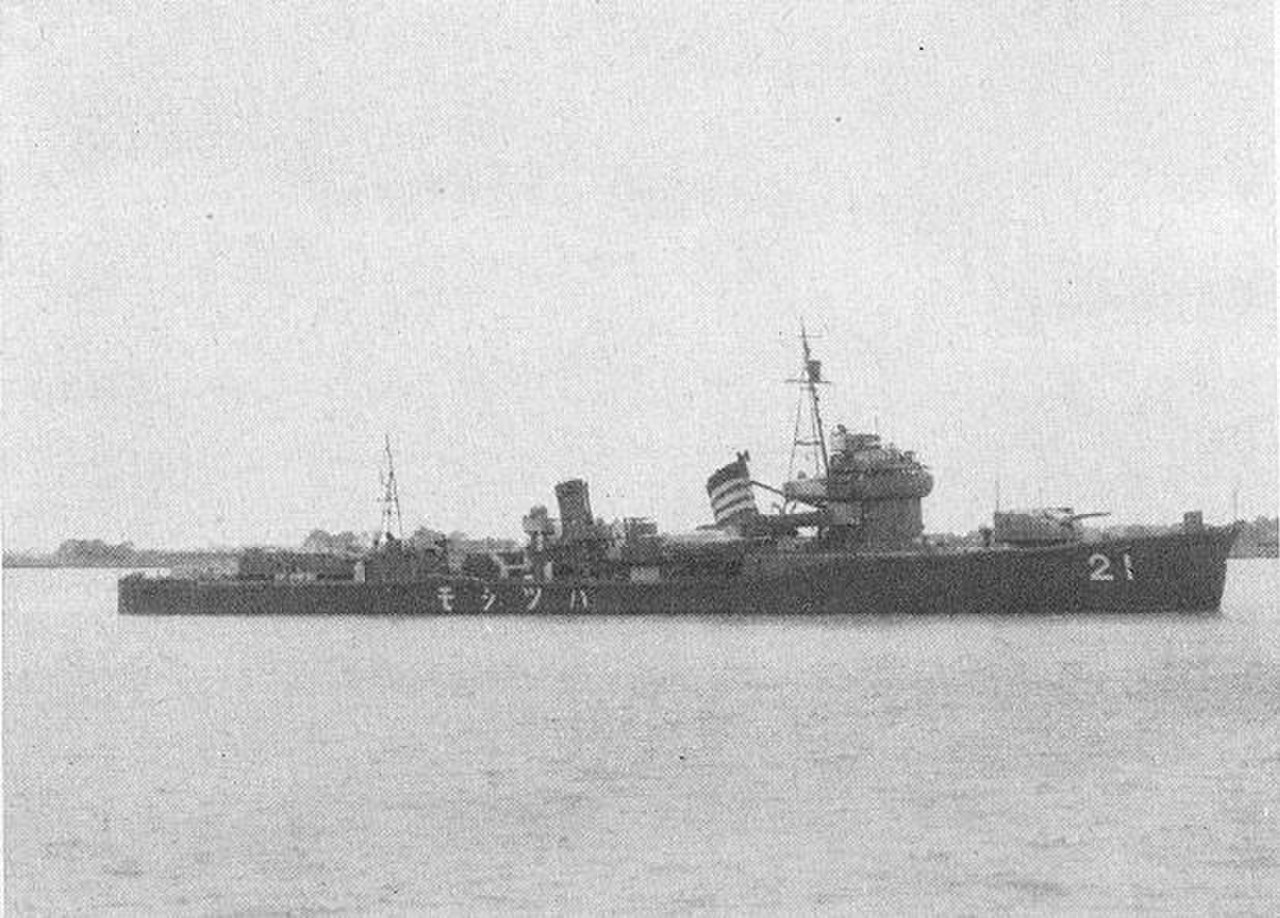
Photo of Hatsushimo captured by the US navy

=== World War II history ===
At the time of the attack on Pearl Harbor, Hatsushimo was assigned to Destroyer Division 21 of Destroyer Squadron 1 of the IJN 1st Fleet together with her sister ships Hatsuharu, Nenohi, and Wakaba, and remained in Japanese home waters on anti-submarine patrol. From the end of January 1942, she deployed with the invasion force for the Netherlands East Indies as part of "Operation H", covering landing operations at Kendari on Sulawesi on 24 January, Makassar on 8 February, and Bali and Lombok on 18 February. On 28 February, destroyer division 21 was operating in the Java Sea, when they encountered the Dutch cargo ship Siaoe, prompting Hatsushimo and Wakaba to engage the vessel with gunfire and sink it with the loss of almost all hands; just three Siaoe survivors were rescued by the Dutch freighter Tomohon. The next day, desdiv 21 was still operating off Java when they encountered the USS Alden, John D. Edwards, John D. Ford, and Paul Jones. which were the only allied survivors of the battle of the Java Sea and were attempting to escape through the Bali Strait. Hatsushimo and the others dueled the American destroyers, but not a single hit was scored on either side as the enemy successfully escaped to safety in Australia. Hatsushimo returned to Sasebo Naval Arsenal at the end of March for maintenance. (Note: The exact identify of the vessel Hatsushimo and Wakaba sank is not completely confirmed, but the Dutch cargo ship Siaoe remains a likely candite due to the location and timeframe matching.)

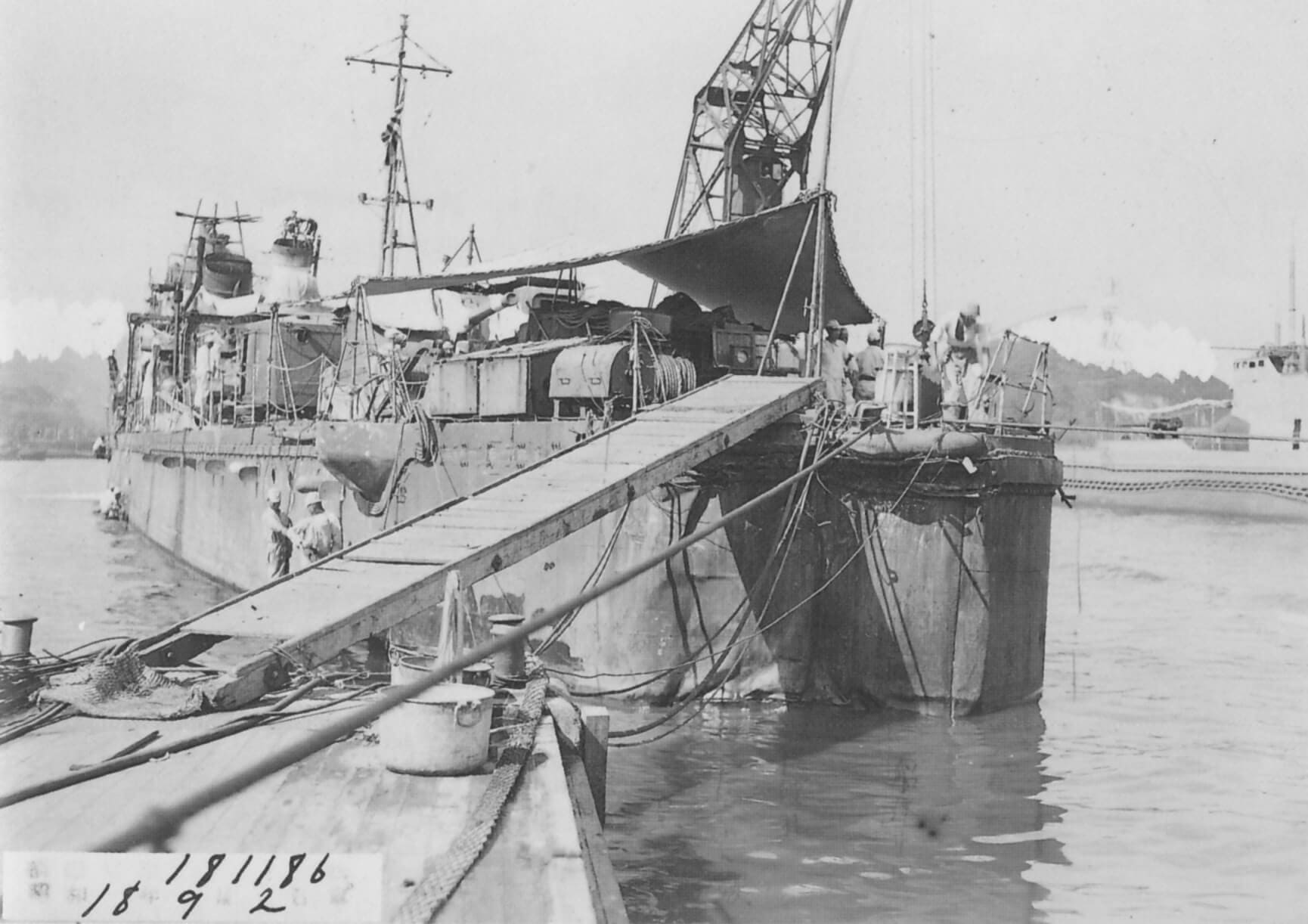
Hatsushimo docked for repairs in Yokosuka, 2 September 1943.

From May 1942, Hatsushimo was reassigned to northern operations, and deployed from Ōminato Guard District with Destroyer Division 21 and Abukuma as part of "Operation AL" in support of Admiral Boshiro Hosogaya’s Northern Force in the Aleutians campaign, patrolling around Attu, Kiska and Amchitka Island until mid-July. After returning briefly to Yokosuka Naval Arsenal for maintenance, she continued to patrol in the Chishima Islands, deploying out of Paramushiro or Shumushu to Attu and Kiska, making numerous transport runs to deploy supplies and reinforcements until December.

Hatsushimo returned to Sasebo at the end of 1942, and during a refit, her aft 40 mm (1.6 in) (pom pom) was replaced by twin 25 mm (0.98 in) Type 96 anti-aircraft guns.

Hatsushimo returned to northern waters from January 1943, continuing patrols and resupply transport missions to the Aleutians. On 26 March, she participated in the Battle of the Komandorski Islands as part of the IJN 5th Fleet, and unsuccessfully engaged United States Navy forces at long range with torpedoes. She withdrew together with Nachi and Maya to Yokosuka at the end of March.

Hatsushimo rejoined the IJN 5th Fleet in northern waters in mid-May, escorting convoys between Paramushiro and Ōminato to late June. In July, she participated in the evacuation of the Aleutians as part of a screening force consisting of the destroyers Wakaba, Naganami, Shimakaze and Samidare . On 26 July, Hatsushimo rammed Wakaba in the stern and was rammed in turn by Naganami during heavy fog, suffering moderate damage. On her return to Yokosuka for a months of repairs in September, a Type 22 radar was installed, the “X”-turret was removed, and additional 25 mm anti-aircraft guns were added. She was able to return to active duty in mid-October, when she escorted the aircraft carriers Ryūhō and Chitose to Singapore and back.

From 24 November, Hatsushimo escorted the carrier Hiyō from Kure to Truk via Manila, Singapore, Tarakan and Palau, returning with the carriers Unyō and Zuihō to Yokosuka at the end of the year.

At the start of 1944, Hatsushimo was reassigned directly to Combined Fleet headquarters, and continued in escort patrol missions between Yokosuka and Truk. She returned to Sasebo on 14 April, where additional 25 mm anti-aircraft guns were added along with an additional Type 22 radar. In June, she participated in the Battle of the Philippine Sea as part of the First Supply Force, and continued in escort missions between Japan and the Philippines through September. In a maintenance refit at Kure Naval Arsenal, additional 25-mm anti-aircraft guns and a Type 13 radar were added. Hatsushimo continued with transport and escort missions to the Philippines through November.

Hatsushimo under air attacks during Operation Ten-Go, 7 April 1945

On 24 October 1944, after the Battle of Leyte Gulf, Hatsushimo rescued 74 survivors from the sunken Wakaba On 15 November 1944, Hatsushimo was reassigned to the IJN 2nd Fleet and assigned to escort missions between Singapore and Cam Ranh Bay in French Indochina through the end of the year. It came just two days after her flotilla leader Hatsuharu had been sunk in shallow waters by US air attacks off Manila.

In February 1945 Hatsushimo escorted the battleships Ise and Hyūga from Singapore back to Kure during Operation Kita. While at Kure, yet more 25-mm anti-aircraft guns were installed. In April 1945, Hatsushimo was part of the escort for the battleship Yamato during her final Operation Ten-Go. She was not hit during the mission, and rescued survivors from Yamato, Yahagi and Hamakaze. including Yahagi's captain, Tameichi Hara.

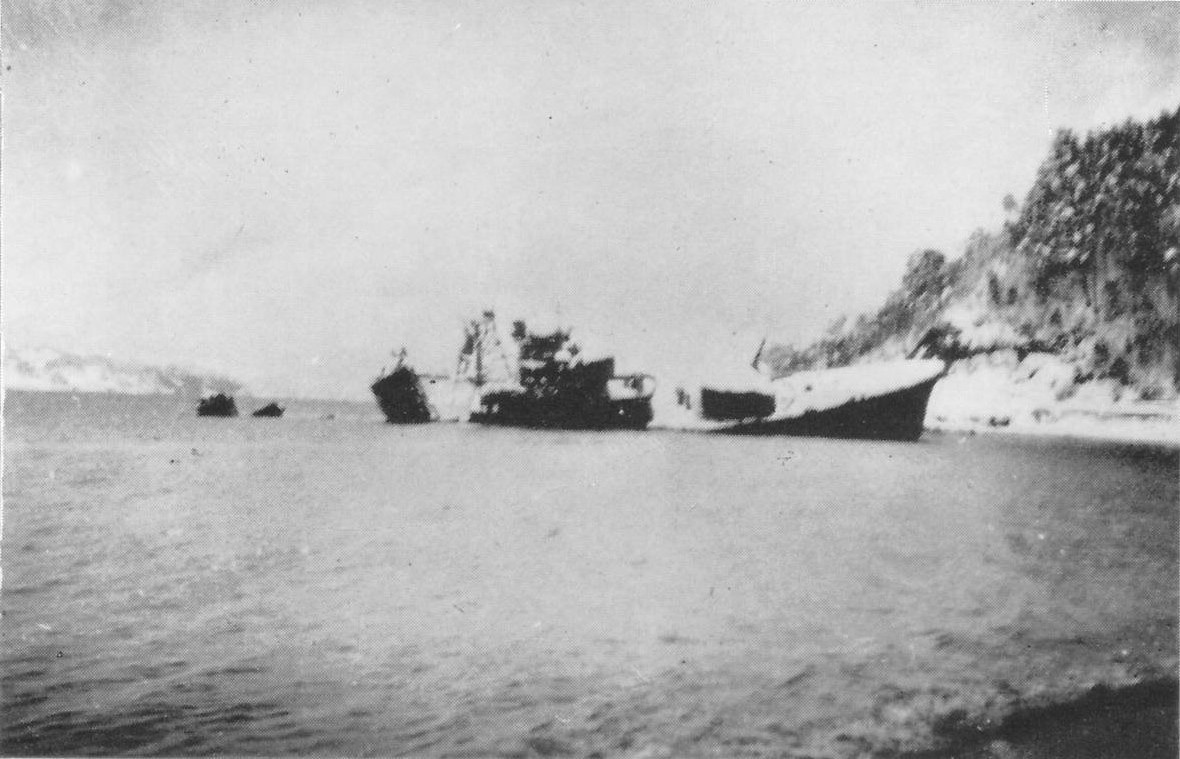
The beached Hatsushimo in 1947

She was subsequently reassigned to Maizuru for use as a training and guard vessels. On 30 July 1945, Hatsushimo struck an air dropped naval mine while under attack from United States Navy aircraft from TF38 at Miyazu Bay, forcing her crew to beach her at 35°33′N 135°12′E. The attack killed 17 crewmen. Hatsushimo was the 129th and last destroyer of the Imperial Japanese Navy to be lost during the war.

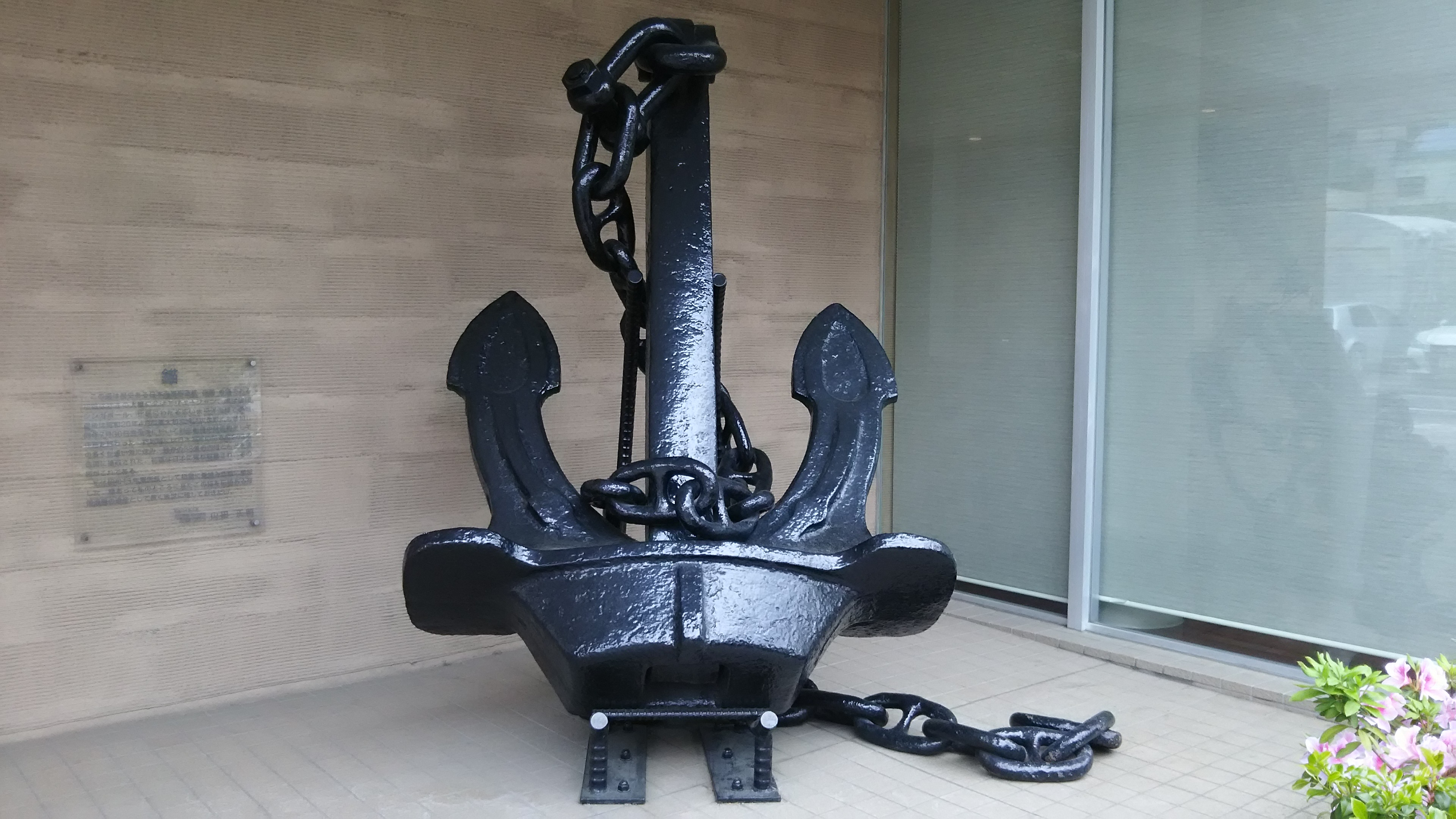
The anchor of Hatsushimo in Tokyo

On 30 September 1945, Hatsushimo was removed from the navy list. Her wreck was salvaged and broken up in Maizuru Shipyard with scrapping work completed on 31 November 1948. Her anchor was collected at the time of disassembly and it is exhibited in a hospital in Tokyo.
