= Japanese destroyer Hatsuharu =

Hatsuharu may refer to:

- Japanese destroyer Hatsuharu (1906), an Asakaze-class Imperial Japanese Navy destroyer launched in 1906 that saw service in World War I and was stricken in 1925
- Japanese destroyer Hatsuharu (1933), an Imperial Japanese Navy destroyer launched and commissioned in 1933 which saw action in World War II and was sunk in 1944
- Hatsuharu-class destroyer, a class of Imperial Japanese Navy destroyers built between 1931 and 1935 which saw service in World War II
