= Hatsuharu-class destroyer =

Ship class

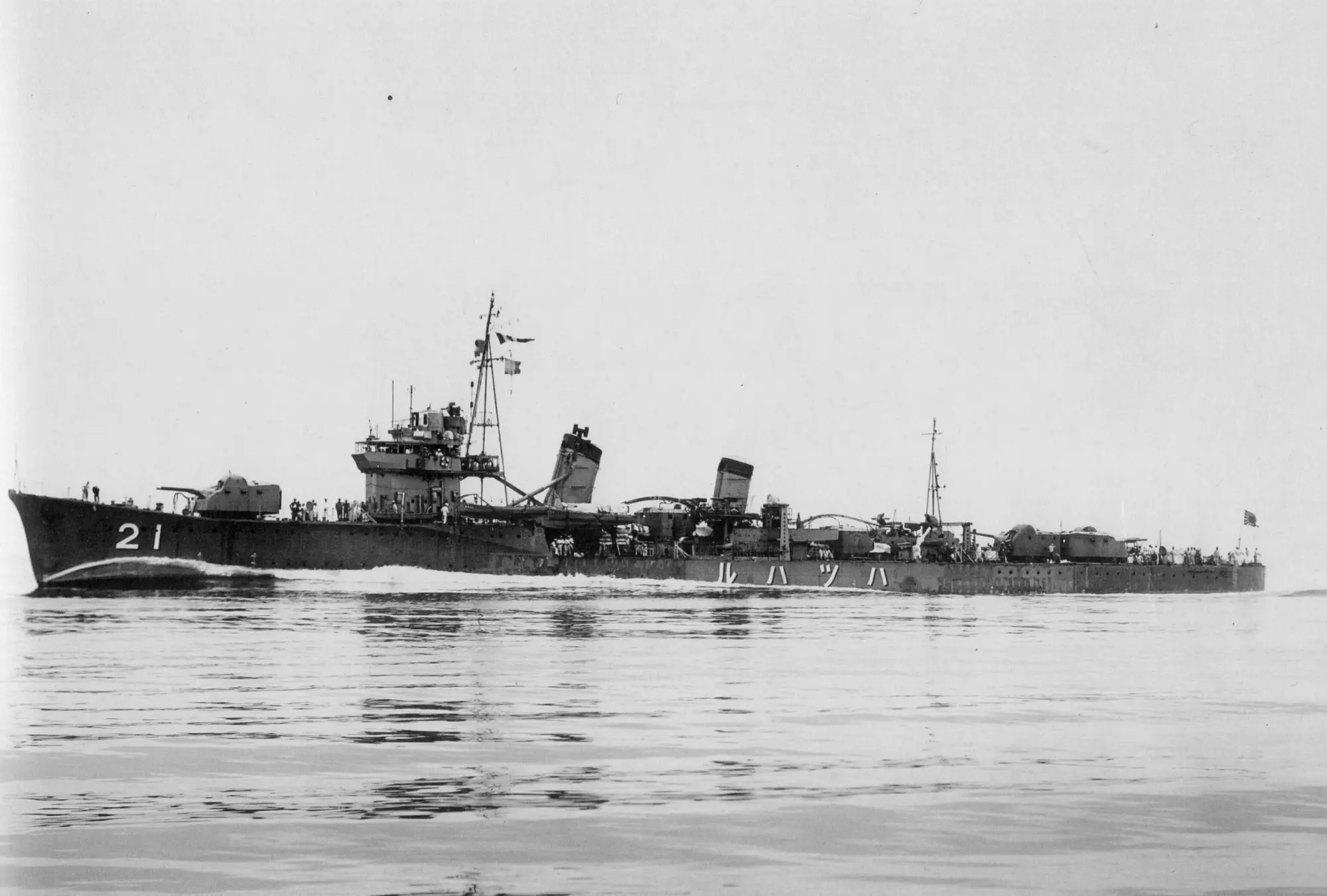
- Hatsuharu in 1934 as reconstructed

Class overview
- Name: Hatsuharu class
- Builders: Sasebo Naval Arsenal (2); Uraga Dock Company (2); Kawasaki Dockyard Co.; Kobe Shipyard (1); Maizuru Naval Arsenal (1)
- Operators: Imperial Japanese Navy
- Preceded by: Akatsuki class
- Succeeded by: Shiratsuyu class
- Subclasses: Ariake class
- Built: 1931–1935
- In commission: 1933–1945
- Completed: 6
- Lost: 6

General characteristics (as initially completed)
- Type: Destroyer
- Displacement: 1,530 t (1,510 long tons)
- Length: 109.5 m (359 ft 3 in) overall
- Beam: 10 m (32 ft 10 in)
- Draught: 3.38 m (11 ft 1 in)
- Installed power: 3 water-tube boilers; 42,000 shp (31,000 kW)
- Propulsion: 2 shafts; 2 Kampon steam turbines
- Speed: 36 knots (67 km/h; 41 mph)
- Range: 4,000 nmi (7,400 km; 4,600 mi) at 14 knots (26 km/h; 16 mph)
- Complement: 212
- Armament: 2 × twin, 1 × single 127 mm (5 in) guns; 2 × single 40 mm AA guns; 2 × triple 610 mm (24 in) torpedo tubes; 18 × depth charges

The Hatsuharu-class destroyers (初春型駆逐艦, Hatsuharugata kuchikukan) were a class of Imperial Japanese Navy destroyers in the service before and during World War II. The final two vessels in the class, completed after modifications to the design, are sometimes considered a separate "Ariake class".

== Background ==
The provisions of 1930 London Naval Treaty stipulated that the overall destroyer tonnage for the Imperial Japanese Navy would be capped at 105,500 tons with a maximum permissible tonnage per ship of 1,850 tons. Furthermore, only 16 percent of the overall tonnage could be of this size, with the remainder not exceeding 1,500 tons per vessel. This effectively meant that additional units of the previous Fubuki and Akatsuki-class destroyers could no longer be built. The Imperial Japanese Navy responded by ordering naval architects to design ships that were lighter by at least 260 tons, and yet mount the same armament. In the end, the new class ended up with one less gun (three turrets with five 127 mm guns instead of six), with a smaller hull and displacement. This armament design was not unprecedented, however, as the two Romanian Navy destroyers Mărăști and Mărășești were fitted with two twin and one single 120 mm guns a few years prior, in 1926.

This stretched contemporary destroyer designs beyond the limits, and resulted in a top-heavy design, with severe stability problems. The weight-control measures used by designers were carried to an extreme, which further contributed to structural weakness. This was a problem shared with other Japanese ship designs of the time, which attempted to place too much armament on too small a displacement hull. This was graphically demonstrated when the torpedo boat Tomozuru capsized in 1934 during heavy seas (the "Tomozuru Incident") and when a typhoon ripped the bows off two Fubuki-class destroyers (the Fourth Fleet Incident) in 1935. As a result of these two incidents the Hatsuharu-class vessels had to be rebuilt (the first two completed had to be rebuilt twice) or modified while building to remedy their stability problems.

== Design ==
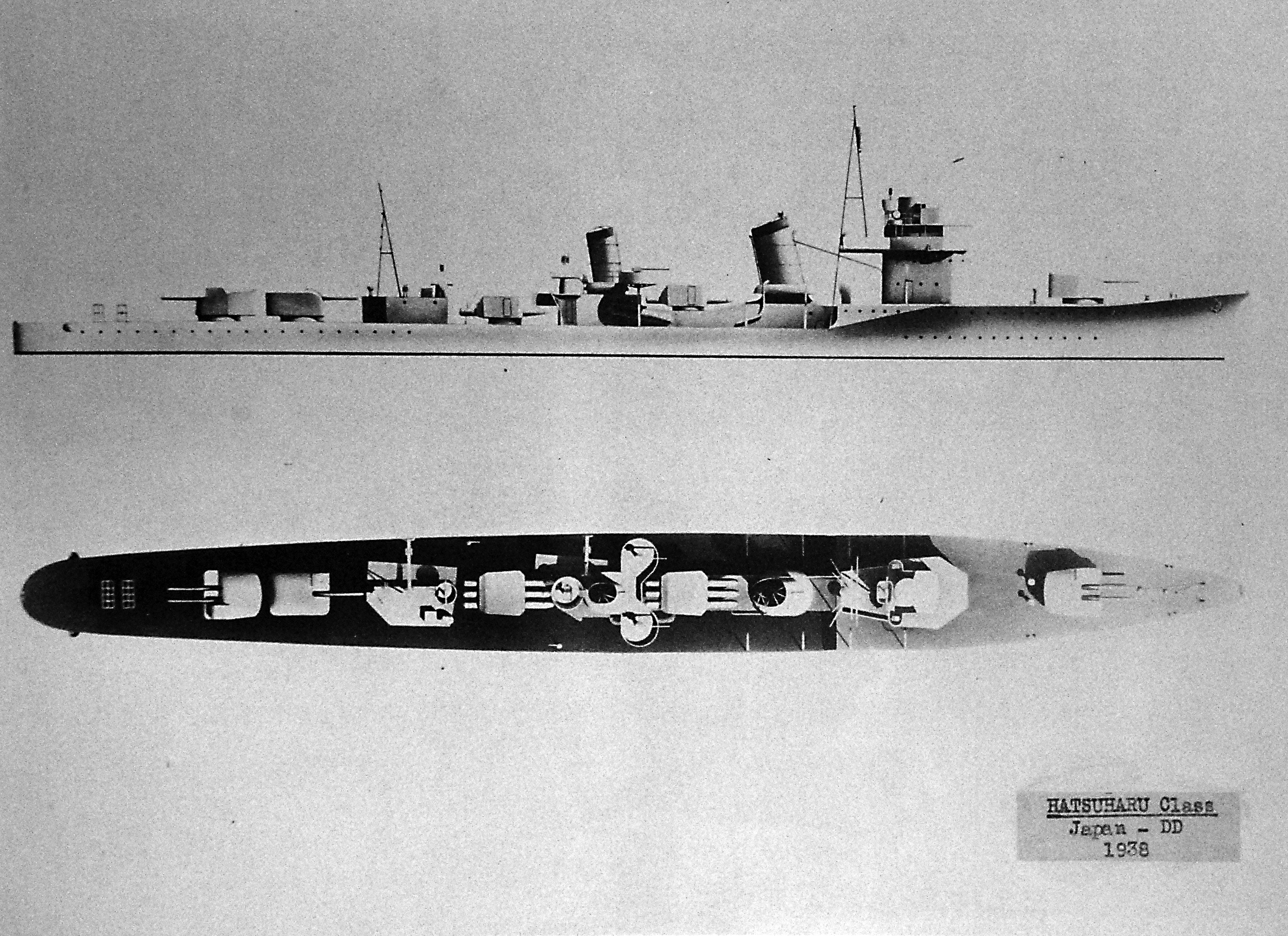
Hatsuharu class side and overhead views

The Hatsuharu-class destroyers were designed to accompany the Japanese main striking force and to conduct both day and night torpedo attacks against the United States Navy as it advanced across the Pacific Ocean, according to Japan's naval strategic projections. They were to be armed much as the Fubuki class despite displacing only 1400 tons compared to the 1700 tons of the earlier destroyers. Furthermore, their fire control systems were to be more modern than the older systems and suitable for anti-aircraft use. This required the gun turrets to be modified for high-angle fire, which also meant more powerful motors to traverse and elevate the guns more quickly to engage high-speed aircraft. The torpedo launchers were to be given a protective shield to allow for use in heavy weather and to protect against splinter damage. And the Hatsuharu vessels were to be fitted with modern, enclosed command spaces protected against strafing aircraft. These requirements could only be met by adding weight high up on the ship and increased the ship's center of gravity. The only way to adhere to the allotted displacement was to try to reduce the weight of the hull and other equipment below the waterline as much as possible. But this put the ship's designers in a no-win situation as any reduction of weight below the waterline further raised the ship's center of gravity and reduced her stability.

The weight of the hull could generally be reduced by using higher grades of steel that were lighter and thinner for the same strength, reducing dimensions, particularly length, or using advanced construction techniques like welding that saved weight over the conventional riveting. The Japanese used the same high-tensile steel for the Hatsuharu class as they did for the older destroyers and chose not to increase the power of the turbines and boilers to achieve the desired high speed, but lengthened the hull to offset the reduced power of the light-weight machinery. The beam was increased to counter some of the extra top-weight, but the draft was reduced to reduce hull resistance, which also reduced stability by lessening the area of the hull beneath the waterline in comparison to the area above it, which was subject to pressure from the wind.

Extensive weight-saving measures were used during the design and construction of the hull. More frames of lighter construction were spaced more closely together to reduce the thickness of the hull plating and the extensive use of welding (only the longitudinal stringers and a few other parts were riveted) were some of the techniques utilized to reduce hull weight by 66.5 tonnes (65.4 long tons; 73.3 short tons) in comparison to the Fubuki class. Electric welding was extensively used to reduce weight although it was at an early stage of development in Japan and was still problematic. The Hatsuharu vessels were some 10 metres (32 ft 10 in) shorter than the Fubuki-class vessels, but weighed 4.9 tonnes (4.8 long tons; 5.4 short tons) per 1 metre (3.3 ft) of hull length compared to the latter's 5.09 tonnes (5.01 long tons; 5.61 short tons) per 1 metre (3.3 ft).

== Description ==
The Hatsuharu-class ships were shorter than their predecessors, at 109.5 m (359 ft 3 in) overall. The ships had a beam of 10 metres and at full load a draft of 3.35 m (11 ft 0 in). Despite the emphasis on weight-saving during construction, the ships were significantly overweight as completed and displaced 1,530 metric tons (1,510 long tons) at standard load, and 1,981 metric tons (1,950 long tons) at full load, nearly 130 metric tons (100 long tons) more than planned.

The hull of the Hatsuharu-class vessels retained the general configuration of the Fubuki-class destroyers with a long forecastle and a pronounced flare of the forecastle to improve sea-keeping at high speeds by adding buoyancy and reducing the spray and water coming over the deck. A large bridge structure was located at the aft end of the forecastle deck topped by four fire control stations of various types. Lowest, just above the compass bridge, was the torpedo director (Hassha shikisho), with the gunnery fire direction station (Shageki shikisho) next above. The fire director tower (Hōiban shagekito) was third from the bottom and behind it was the 3 m (9 ft 10 in) rangefinder. Each of these was protected by 10 mm (0.39 in) plates of Dücol steel against strafing and shell splinters.

For the first time in a Japanese destroyer, a superfiring turret was fitted forward of the bridge. It was only a single gun Model A turret, to save weight high in the ship, and was mounted on a deckhouse to elevate it above the twin gun Model B Mod 2 (B-gata kai-2) turret mounted on the forecastle deck. The second twin gun turret was mounted at the rear of the ship on the main deck. These turrets were slightly heavier than the earlier Model A and Model B turrets fitted on the Fubuki-class. All turrets were fitted with the 12.7 cm (5.0 in) Type 3 gun.

The uptakes of the two forward boiler rooms were trunked together aft of the break in the forecastle into the fore funnel while the rear boiler room exhausted into the smaller rear funnel. Both funnels were inclined to the rear to reduce the amount of smoke that might reach the bridge. A tripod mast was fitted between the bridge and the fore funnel. Between the two funnels was the forward 61 centimetres (24 in) triple torpedo tube mount fitted on a low platform. Behind it "was a torpedo locker with its mechanical quick reload system (Kiryoku sōtenshiki jihatsu sōten sochi) for the three reserve torpedoes inside." To preserve lateral stability the aft funnel was offset to starboard while the torpedo mount was offset to port. The reload locker was also offset slightly to port and angled inboard to facilitate reloading. The middle torpedo mount was positioned behind the aft funnel on the centerline, but its reload locker was positioned identically to that of the forward mount. Superimposed to starboard and overlapping the middle mount was the rear triple torpedo mount positioned on the rear deckhouse. Immediately behind the mount was its locker positioned on the centerline, but angled slightly to the right so that its mount only had to traverse slightly to align with the locker and begin reloading. This was the first ship in history to be fitted with superimposed torpedo tubes, made necessary by the designer's insistence on fitting nine torpedo tubes despite the Navy's requirement for only six.

A small platform that carried a 2 m (6 ft 7 in) rangefinder was mounted above the rear torpedo locker and a 90 cm (2 ft 11 in) searchlight was mounted on a tower behind the rear funnel. The two license-built Vickers 40 mm (1.6 in) (pom pom) anti-aircraft guns were mounted on an elevated platform at the front of the rear funnel. Curiously they were another case where the designer exceeded the requirements laid down by the Navy.

=== Propulsion ===
The Hatsuharus carried two sets of Kampon geared steam turbines, one for each shaft. Each set consisted one low-pressure and one high-pressure turbine, plus a cruise turbine connected to the high-pressure turbine. The LP and HP turbines were connected to the propeller shaft by a two-pinion reduction gear. Each propeller had a diameter of 3.05 m (10 ft 0 in) and a pitch of 3.7 m (12 ft 2 in). The total horsepower of the Hatsuharu class was only 42,000 shp (31,000 kW) compared to the 50,000 shp (37,000 kW) of their Fubuki-class predecessors, but the machinery was significantly lighter and more powerful on a unit basis. The Hatsuharus' machinery weighed only 106 tonnes (104 long tons; 117 short tons) compared to the 144 tonnes (142 long tons; 159 short tons) of the Fubuki class, or 396 shaft horsepower per tonne versus 347 shaft horsepower per tonne for the older ships.

Similarly the three Kampon Type Ro-Gō boilers used in the Hatsuharu-class ships weighed 50 tonnes (49 long tons; 55 short tons) in comparison to the 51 tonnes (50 long tons; 56 short tons) boilers used in the Fubuki class, but produced 14,000 shp (10,000 kW) each while the older boilers produced 12,500 hp (9,300 kW). This gave a ratio of 3.6 kg per shaft horsepower for the Hatsuharu's compared to the 4.1 kg per shaft horsepower of their predecessors. The newer design of boilers initially used steam pressurized to 20-bar (290 psi), just like the older models, but used superheating to improve efficiency while the older boilers simply used saturated steam.

A single 100 kW turbo-generator was fitted behind the reduction gears in a separate compartment and two 40 kW diesel generators were located between the propeller shafts. As initially completed the Hatsuharu had a range of 4,000 nautical miles (7,400 km; 4,600 mi) at a speed of 18 knots (33 km/h; 21 mph) with 460 tonnes (450 long tons; 510 short tons) of fuel. On trials, Nenohi had a top speed of 37.64 knots (69.71 km/h; 43.32 mph) from 47,150 shp (35,160 kW) at a displacement of 1,677 tonnes (1,651 long tons; 1,849 short tons).

=== Armament ===
The Hatsuharu-class destroyers used the same 50-caliber 12.7 cm gun as the Fubuki class, but all turrets could elevate to 75° to give the main guns a minimal ability to engage aircraft. During the war the single turret was removed on all surviving ships after 1942. The only anti-aircraft guns were two water-cooled, license-built Vickers 40-millimeter guns. These guns were deemed to be too heavy, slow-firing and short-ranged and were replaced by license-built French Hotchkiss 25 mm (0.98 in) Type 96 anti-aircraft guns in single, double and triple mounts from 1943 for the surviving ships. Exact numbers are not always known, but Hatsuharu was carrying three triple power-driven mounts, including one mounted in lieu of the single 12.7 cm gun turret, one twin power-driven mount fitted on a platform in front of the bridge and two hand-worked single mounts in June 1944. These powered mounts were unsatisfactory because their traverse and elevation speeds were too slow to engage high-speed aircraft and more single mounts were fitted to ships in the last year of the war. For example, Hatsushimo mounted ten single 25 guns when she was lost in July 1945. Four license-built Hotchkiss 13.2 mm (0.52 in) Type 93 machine guns were also fitted to Hatsushimo, but these were of limited utility against modern aircraft.

The 61 cm Type 90 torpedo was mounted in triple tube Type 90 Model 2 launchers, derived from the twin tube Type 89 launcher used in the Takao-class heavy cruisers. Shields were fitted to both the torpedo mounts and lockers to protect them from the weather and from strafing aircraft. Initially, the shields were made from Duralumin to save weight, but these quickly corroded and had to be replaced. "NiCrMo" steel, taken from the air chambers of obsolete torpedoes, 3 mm (0.12 in) in thickness, was chosen for the new shields to save weight. The Type 90 Model 2 weighed, including the shield, a total of 14.4 tonnes (14.2 long tons; 15.9 short tons) excluding the torpedo itself. Despite the addition of an extra torpedo tube, it was still lighter than the 14.5 tonnes (14.3 long tons; 16.0 short tons) of the Type 89. It was traversed by an electro-hydraulic system and could traverse 360° in twenty-five seconds. If the backup manual system was used the time required increased to two minutes. Each tube could be reloaded in twenty-three seconds using the endless wire and winch provided.

Only eighteen depth charges were initially carried in a rack at the stern, but this increased to thirty-six after the autumn of 1942. Apparently, no sonar or hydrophones were fitted until after the outbreak of the war when the Type 93 sonar and Type 93 hydrophones were mounted. Both of these were inferior to contemporary American and British designs.

=== Radar ===
Radar was not installed on the surviving ships of this class until late in the war, possibly as late as 1944. They were given a Type 22 radar on the foremast, a Type 13 on the mainmast and a Type E-27 radar countermeasures device was carried high on the foremast.

== Construction ==
A dozen Hatsuharu-class destroyers were authorized in 1931 as part of the so-called Circle One Program (Maru Ichi Keikaku). Three were laid down in Fiscal Year 1931 and the next three in Fiscal Year 1933. The remaining six ships were built as the Shiratsuyu class.

Ships of the Hatsuharu class
Ship	Kanji	Shipyard	Laid down	Launched	Completed	Fate
Hatsuharu	初春	Sasebo Naval Arsenal	14 May 1931	27 February 1933	30 September 1933	Air attack in Manila Bay, 13 November 1944 (Philippines Campaign (1944-1945))
Nenohi	子日	Uraga Dock Company	15 December 1931	22 December 1932	30 September 1933	Torpedoed near Agattu Island, 4 July 1942 (Aleutian Islands Campaign)
Wakaba	若葉	Sasebo Naval Arsenal	12 December 1931	18 March 1934	31 October 1934	Air attack off Panay, 24 October 1944 (Battle of Leyte Gulf)
Hatsushimo	初霜	Uraga Dock Company	31 January 1933	4 November 1933	27 September 1934	Mined and sunk, 30 July 1945
Ariake	有明	Kawasaki Kobe Shipyard	14 January 1933	23 September 1934	25 March 1935	Air attack near Cape Gloucester, 28 July 1943
Yūgure	夕暮	Maizuru Naval Arsenal	9 April 1933	6 May 1934	30 March 1935	Air attack off Kolombangara, 20 July 1943 (New Georgia Campaign)

== Design modifications ==
On trials Hatsuharu was found to roll heavily, with a very short period of roll and she heeled at an angle of 38° at high speed when her helm was set to 10°. This demonstrated to the Navy that her metacentric height was too low. The Navy ordered in September 1933 that 30-centimetre (12 in) bulges be fitted on each side to increase her beam and thus raise the metacentric height. Hatsuharu and Nenohi were modified after completion; Wakaba and Hatsushimo were modified during construction. Ariake and Yugure were at a much earlier stage of construction and had their beam increased by 1 metre (3.3 ft). The bulges were estimated to add 30 tonnes (30 long tons; 33 short tons) to the trial displacement.

The capsizing of the torpedo boat Tomozuru in 1934 forced the Navy to re-evaluate the heavy armament of the Hatsuharu and other classes. As a result of the investigations in ship stability after the capsizing of Tomozuru, all vessels in the Hatsuharu class were modified to improve their stability:

- The after deckhouse and rangefinder were removed and the forward single 12.7 cm gun mounting was relocated to this position, directly ahead of the after twin gun mount; its magazine was converted for use as a fuel tank.
- The No.3 triple torpedo mount and its reload locker were removed.
- The compass bridge was lowered by one level and the anti-strafing armor was removed from the entire bridge structure.
- Both funnels were shortened by 1–1.5 metres (3 ft 3 in – 4 ft 11 in) as were both masts.
- The forward torpedo tube mount was lowered 30 centimetres (12 in), the machine-gun platform by 1.5 metres (4 ft 11 in) and the searchlight platform by 2 metres (6 ft 7 in).
- The bulges were removed and the anchor chain stowage was lowered by one deck.
- The outer bottom plating was reinforced and about 70 tonnes (69 long tons; 77 short tons) of ballast was added in the ship's bottom.
- An automatic system was fitted which filled part of the fuel tanks with seawater to compensate for the consumption of fuel and resulting rise in the center of gravity and hence loss of stability. When the sea water was added to the fuel tank due to their different specific gravities the seawater sank to the bottom of the tank, while the oil floated on top.

The first two ships of the class — Hatsuharu and Nenohi — had already entered service by the time of the Tomozuru incident. They were removed from service and modified in the Kure Naval Arsenal. The remaining four members of the class were still under construction and were modified before completion.

Based on the stability issues shown by Hatsuharu during her trials, Ariake and Yūgure had been modified for two balanced rudders placed directly behind the propellers and angled outward 18.5° to reduce the angle of heel when turning. These proved to reduce their speed by one knot and were removed after their trials as superfluous since both ships had been rebuilt to reflect the lessons of the Tomozuru incident. The two ships also had a beamier hull and a shallower draft to accommodate the rudders, and this allowed them to operate in areas of shallow water.

=== Reinforcement of the hull ===
As a result of hull damage sustained by two Fubuki-class destroyers during a typhoon on 26 September 1935, the subsequent investigation led to all ships in the Hatsuharu class spending 3 months in the shipyards having their hulls strengthened, at the cost of an extra 54 tonnes (53 long tons; 60 short tons) of weight, and their fixed ballast increased from 64 to 84 tonnes (63 to 83 long tons; 71 to 93 short tons). As a result of these and previous modifications the ships were 23.2% heavier, had lost 33% of their torpedo armament and were 3 knots (5.6 km/h) slower compared with their original design values.

== Wartime service ==
All Hatsuharu-class ships were lost during the Pacific War. Four were sunk by aircraft attack, and Nenohi was sunk by the American submarine USS Triton. Hatsushimo, the last Japanese destroyer lost in the war, struck a mine on 30 July 1945. All ships in the class took part in the Invasion of the Aleutians.
