= Japanese destroyer Wakaba (1934) =

Hatsuharu-class destroyer

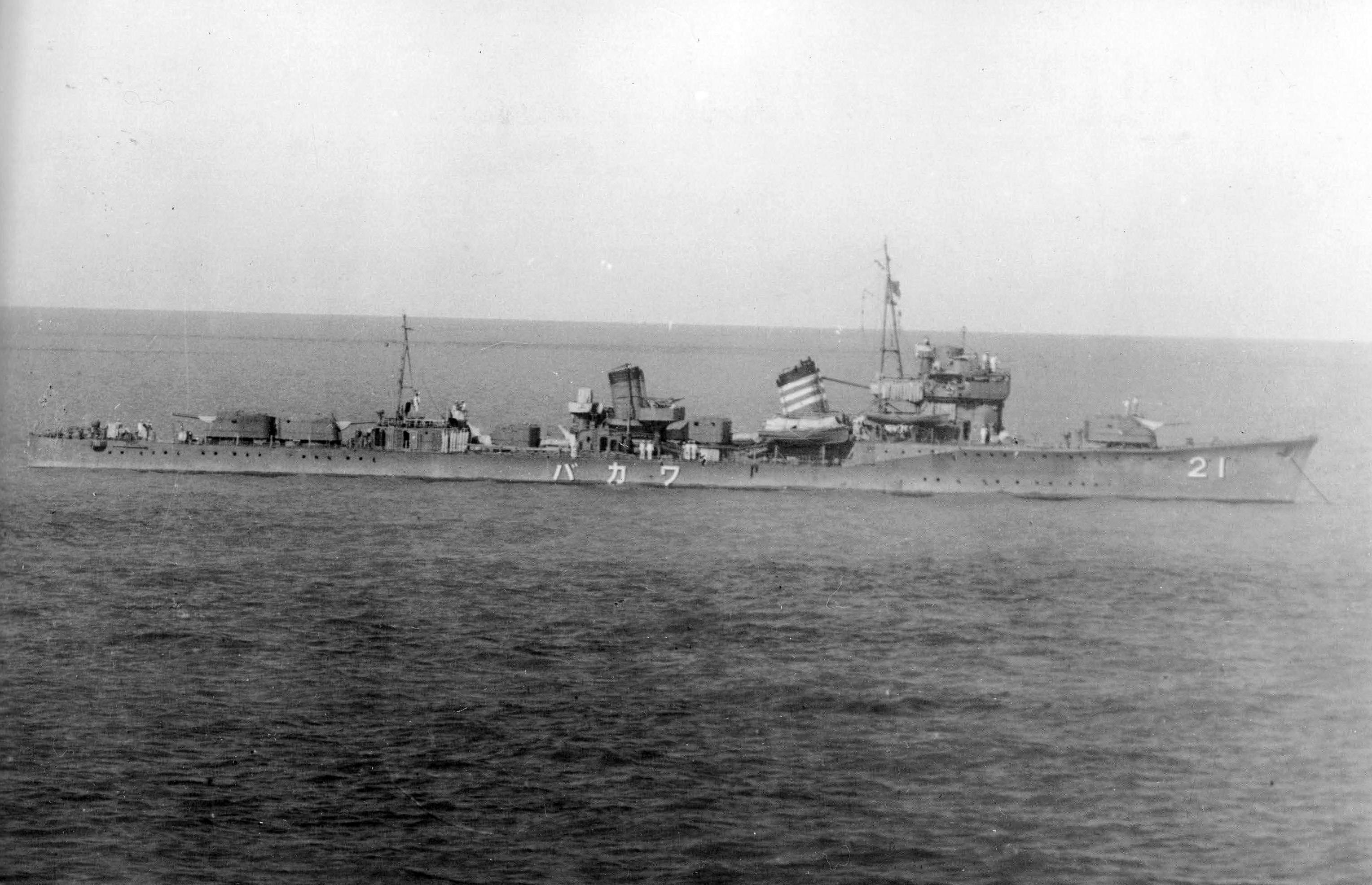
- Wakaba on 21 October 1937.

History

Empire of Japan
- Name: Wakaba
- Ordered: 1931 Fiscal Year
- Builder: Sasebo Naval Arsenal
- Laid down: 12 December 1931
- Launched: 18 March 1934
- Commissioned: 31 October 1934
- Stricken: 10 December 1944
- Fate: Sunk in action, 24 October 1944

General characteristics
- Class & type: Hatsuharu-class destroyer
- Displacement: 1,802 long tons (1,831 t)
- Length: 103.5 m (340 ft) pp, 105.5 m (346 ft) waterline; 109.5 m (359 ft) overall
- Beam: 10 m (32 ft 10 in)
- Draught: 3 m (9 ft 10 in)
- Propulsion: 2 shaft Kampon geared turbines; 3 boilers, 42,000 hp (31,000 kW)
- Speed: 36 knots (41 mph; 67 km/h)
- Range: 4,000 nmi (7,400 km) at 14 kn (26 km/h)
- Complement: 200
- Armament: (as built) 2 × 2, 1 × 1 - 12.7 cm/50 Type 3 naval gun; 2 × 1 - 40 mm AA guns; 3 × 3 - 61 cm (24 in) torpedo tubes; 18 × depth charges

Service record
- Operations: Second Sino-Japanese War; Invasion of French Indochina; Aleutians campaign; Battle of Leyte Gulf

Wakaba (若葉, ”Young Leaves”) was the third of six Hatsuharu-class destroyers, built for the Imperial Japanese Navy under the Circle One Program (Maru Ichi Keikaku). Three were laid down in JFY 1931 and the next three in JFY 1933. The remaining six ships in the plan were built as the Shiratsuyu class.

== History ==
Construction of the advanced Hatsuharu-class destroyers was intended to give the Imperial Japanese Navy smaller and more economical destroyers than the previous Fubuki and Akatsuki-class destroyers, but with essentially the same weaponry. These conflicting goals proved beyond contemporary destroyer design, and the resulting ships were top-heavy design, with severe stability problems and with inherent structural weaknesses. After the "Tomozuru Incident" of 1934 and "IJN 4th Fleet Incident" in 1935, Wakaba underwent extensive modifications on completion to remedy these issues.

The Hatsuharu-class destroyers used the same 50 caliber 12.7 cm gun as the Fubuki class, but all turrets could elevate to 75° to give the main guns a minimal ability to engage aircraft. During the war the single turret was removed on all surviving ships after 1942. The only anti-aircraft guns were two water-cooled, license-built Vickers 40 mm (1.6 in) (pom pom). These guns were deemed to be too heavy, slow-firing and short-ranged and were replaced by license-built French Hotchkiss 25 mm (0.98 in) Type 96 anti-aircraft guns in single, double and triple mounts from 1943 for the surviving ships. These powered mounts were still unsatisfactory because their traverse and elevation speeds were too slow to engage high-speed aircraft and more single mounts were fitted to ships in the last year of the war.

The 61 cm Type 90 torpedo was mounted in triple tube Type 90 Model 2 launchers It was traversed by an electro-hydraulic system and could traverse 360° in twenty-five seconds. If the backup manual system was used the time required increased to two minutes. Each tube could be reloaded in twenty-three seconds using the endless wire and winch provided. Wakaba was laid down on December 12, 1931, launched on March 18, 1934 and commissioned on October 31, 1934.

== Operational history ==
On completion, Wakaba was assigned to the IJN 2nd Fleet. During the Second Sino-Japanese War, from 1937, Wakaba covered landing of Japanese forces in Shanghai and Hangzhou. From 1940, she was assigned to patrol and cover landings of Japanese forces in south China, and participated in the Invasion of French Indochina.

=== World War II history ===
At the time of the attack on Pearl Harbor, Wakaba was assigned as flagship of Destroyer Division 21 of Destroyer Squadron 1 of the IJN 1st Air Fleet together with her sister ships Hatsuharu, Nenohi, and Hatsushimo, and remained in Japanese home waters on anti-submarine patrol. From the end of January 1942, she deployed with the invasion force for the Netherlands East Indies as part of "Operation H", covering landing operations at Kendari on Sulawesi on 24 January, Makassar on 8 February, and Bali and Lombok on 18 February. She returned to Sasebo Naval Arsenal at the end of March for maintenance.

From May 1942, Wakaba was reassigned to northern operations, and deployed from Ōminato Guard District in support of "Operation AL" as part of Admiral Boshiro Hosogaya’s Northern Force in the Aleutians campaign, patrolling around Attu, Kiska and Amchitka Island until mid-July. After returning briefly to Yokosuka Naval Arsenal for maintenance, she continued to patrol in the Chishima Islands, deploying out of Paramushiro or Shumushu to Attu and Kiska, making numerous transport runs to deploy supplies and reinforcements until December.

Wakaba returned to Sasebo at the end of 1942, and during a refit, her aft 40 mm (1.6 in) (pom pom) was replaced by twin 25 mm (0.98 in) Type 96 anti-aircraft guns.

Wakaba returned to northern waters from January 1943, continuing patrols and resupply transport missions to the Aleutians. On 26 March, she participated in the Battle of the Komandorski Islands as part of the IJN 5th Fleet, and unsuccessfully engaged United States Navy forces at long range with torpedoes. She collided with the destroyer Ikazuchi on 30 March, and was withdrawn together with the cruisers Nachi and Maya to Yokosuka for repairs.

Wakaba rejoined the IJN 5th Fleet in northern waters at the end of April, escorting convoys between Paramushiro and Ōminato to early July. In July, she participated in the evacuation of the Aleutians as part of a screening force consisting of the destroyers Hatsushimo, Naganami, Shimakaze and Samidare. On 26 July, she was rammed by Hatsushimo in the stern, suffering heavy damage, which necessitated a return to Sasebo for two months of repairs. While at Sasebo, a Type 22 radar was installed, the "X"-turret was removed, and additional 25 mm anti-aircraft guns were added. She was able to return to active duty with the northern fleet in mid-October.

From 24 November, Wakaba escorted Hiyō, from Kure to Truk via Manila, Singapore, Tarakan and Palau, returning with the aircraft carriers Unyō and Zuihō to Yokosuka at the end of the year.

At the start of 1944, Wakaba was reassigned directly to Combined Fleet headquarters, and continued in escort missions between Yokosuka and Truk. She returned to northern waters from the end of February to the end of June, with additional 25 mm anti-aircraft guns added during maintenance refits at Ōminato at the end of May and Yokosuka at the end of June. In July, she made two troop transport runs to Iwo Jima as part of the Japanese preparations against the American landings. A Type 13 Radar was added at the end of July. In August through October, she escorted troop convoys from Kure to Taiwan and Luzon.

On 24 October 1944, in the Battle of Leyte Gulf, Wakaba was sunk by aircraft from USS Franklin, struck by one or two bombs off the west coast of Panay (11°50′N 121°25′E). Hatsuharu rescued 78 survivors and Hatsushimo 74 survivors.

On 10 December 1944, Wakaba was removed from the navy list.
