= Japanese destroyer Nenohi (1932) =

Hatsuharu-class destroyer

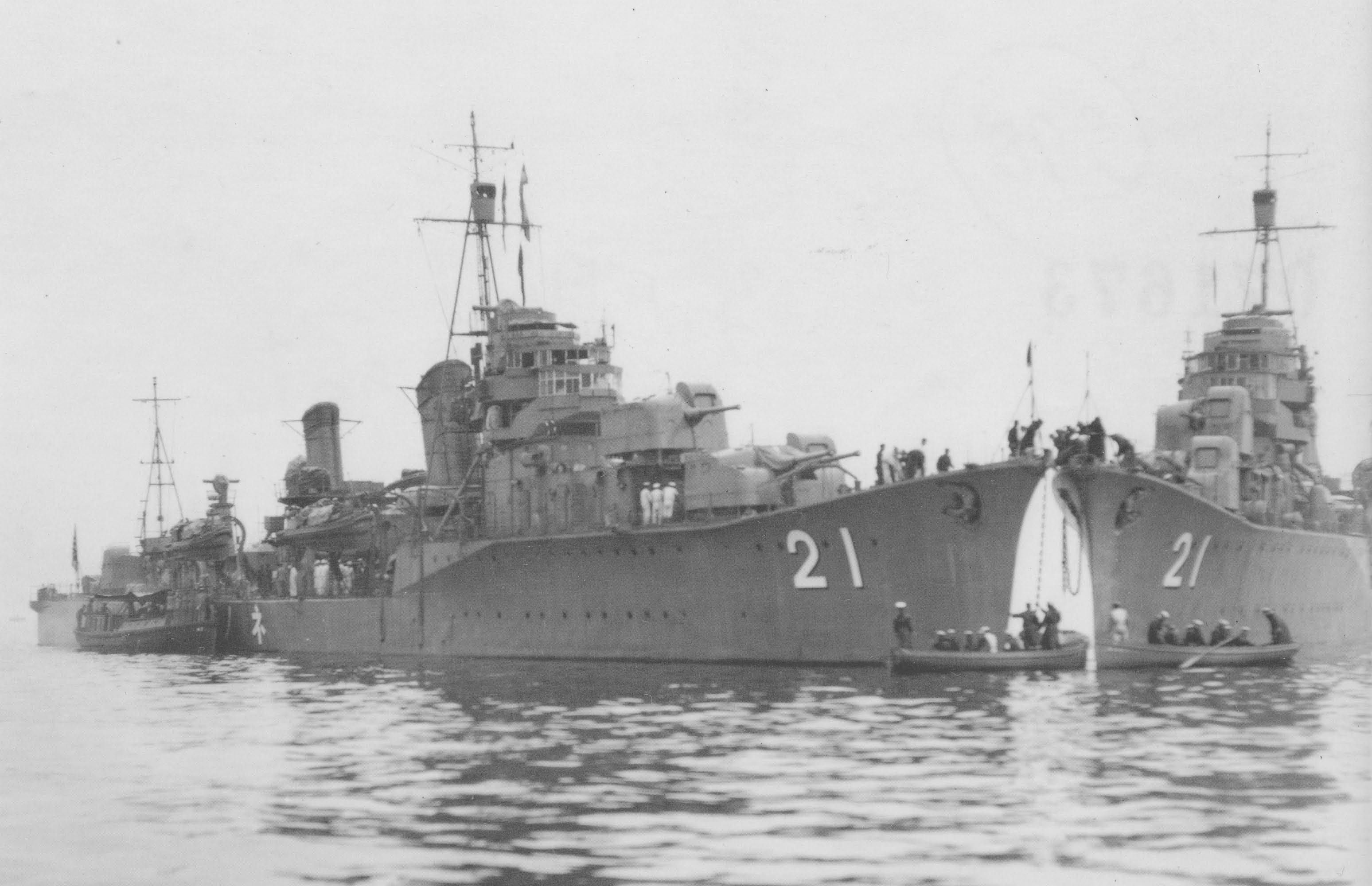
- Nenohi (left) in October 1933.

History

Empire of Japan
- Name: Nenohi
- Namesake: Nenohi (子日, ”New Year Day”)
- Ordered: 1931 Fiscal Year
- Builder: Uraga Dock Company
- Laid down: 5 December 1931
- Launched: 22 December 1932
- Commissioned: 30 September 1933
- Stricken: 31 July 1942
- Fate: Torpedoed and sunk, 4 July 1942

General characteristics
- Class & type: Hatsuharu-class destroyer
- Displacement: 1,802 long tons (1,831 t)
- Length: 103.5 m (340 ft) pp, 105.5 m (346 ft) waterline; 109.5 m (359 ft) overall
- Beam: 10 m (32 ft 10 in)
- Draught: 3 m (9 ft 10 in)
- Propulsion: 2 shaft Kampon geared turbines; 3 boilers, 42,000 hp (31,000 kW)
- Speed: 36 knots (41 mph; 67 km/h)
- Range: 4,000 nmi (7,400 km) at 14 kn (26 km/h)
- Complement: 200
- Armament: (as built) 2 × 2, 1 × 1 - 12.7 cm/50 Type 3 naval gun; 2 × 1 - 40 mm AA guns; 3 × 3 - 61 cm (24 in) torpedo tubes; 18 × depth charges

Service record
- Operations: Second Sino-Japanese War; Invasion of French Indochina; Aleutians campaign

Nenohi (子日, ”New Year Day”) was the second of six Hatsuharu-class destroyers, built for the Imperial Japanese Navy under the Circle One Program (Maru Ichi Keikaku). Three were laid down in JFY 1931 and the next three in JFY 1933. The remaining six ships in the plan were built as the Shiratsuyu class.

== History ==
Construction of the advanced Hatsuharu-class destroyers was intended to give the Imperial Japanese Navy smaller and more economical destroyers than the previous Fubuki and Akatsuki-class destroyers, but with essentially the same weaponry. These conflicting goals proved beyond contemporary destroyer design, and the resulting ships were top-heavy, with severe stability problems and inherent structural weaknesses. After the "Tomozuru Incident" of 1934 and "IJN 4th Fleet Incident" in 1935, Nenohi underwent extensive modifications on completion to remedy these issues. The Hatsuharu-class destroyers used the same 50 caliber 12.7 cm gun as the Fubuki class, but all turrets could elevate to 75° to give the main guns a minimal ability to engage aircraft .

The 61 cm Type 90 torpedo was mounted in triple-tube Type 90 Model 2 launchers. It was traversed by an electro-hydraulic system and could traverse 360° in twenty-five seconds. If the manual backup system was used, the time required increased to two minutes. Each tube could be reloaded in twenty-three seconds using the endless wire and winch provided. Nenohi was laid down on 15 December 1931, launched on 22 December 1932 and commissioned on 30 September 1933.

== Operational history ==
On completion, Nenohi was assigned to the IJN 2nd Expeditionary Fleet, and from 1940, she was assigned to patrol and cover landings of Japanese forces during the Invasion of French Indochina. She was docked at Hanoi during the initial stages of the operation to act as a radio station to coordinate wireless communications during the invasion, and was later based at Haiphong as a guard ship.

=== World War II history ===
At the time of the attack on Pearl Harbor, Nenohi was assigned as flagship of Destroyer Division 21 of Destroyer Squadron 1 of the IJN 1st Fleet together with her sister ships Hatsuharu, Wakaba, and Hatsushimo, and remained in Japanese home waters on anti-submarine patrol. From the end of January 1942, she deployed with the invasion force for the Netherlands East Indies, covering landing operations at Kendari on Sulawesi as part of "Operation H" on 24 January, Makassar on 8 February, and Bali and Lombok on 18 February. She returned to Sasebo Naval Arsenal at the end of March for maintenance.

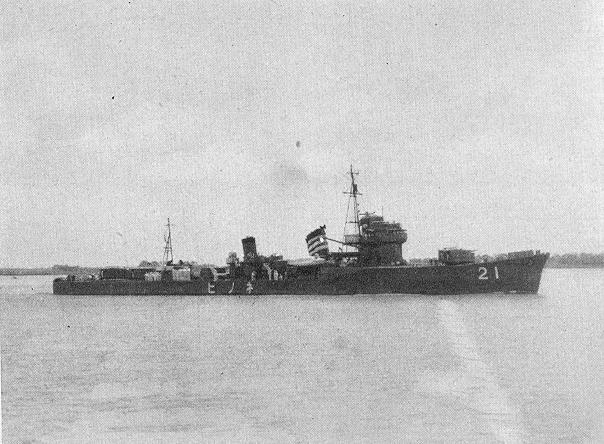
Nenohi

From May 1942, Nenohi was reassigned to northern operations, and deployed from Ōminato Guard District as part of "Operation AL" in support of Admiral Boshiro Hosogaya’s Northern Force in the Aleutians campaign, patrolling around Attu, Kiska and Amchitka Island. On 4 July 1942, Nenohi was torpedoed and sunk by the submarine USS Triton while escorting seaplane tender Kamikawa Maru southeast of Attu, near Agattu Island (52°15′N 173°51′E). She capsized two minutes after being hit and sank in five minutes—188 were killed, including Lieutenant Commander Terauchi; 38 survivors were rescued by the destroyer Inazuma.

On 31 July 1942, Nenohi was removed from the navy list.
