= Japanese destroyer Hatsuharu (1933) =

Hatsuharu-class destroyer

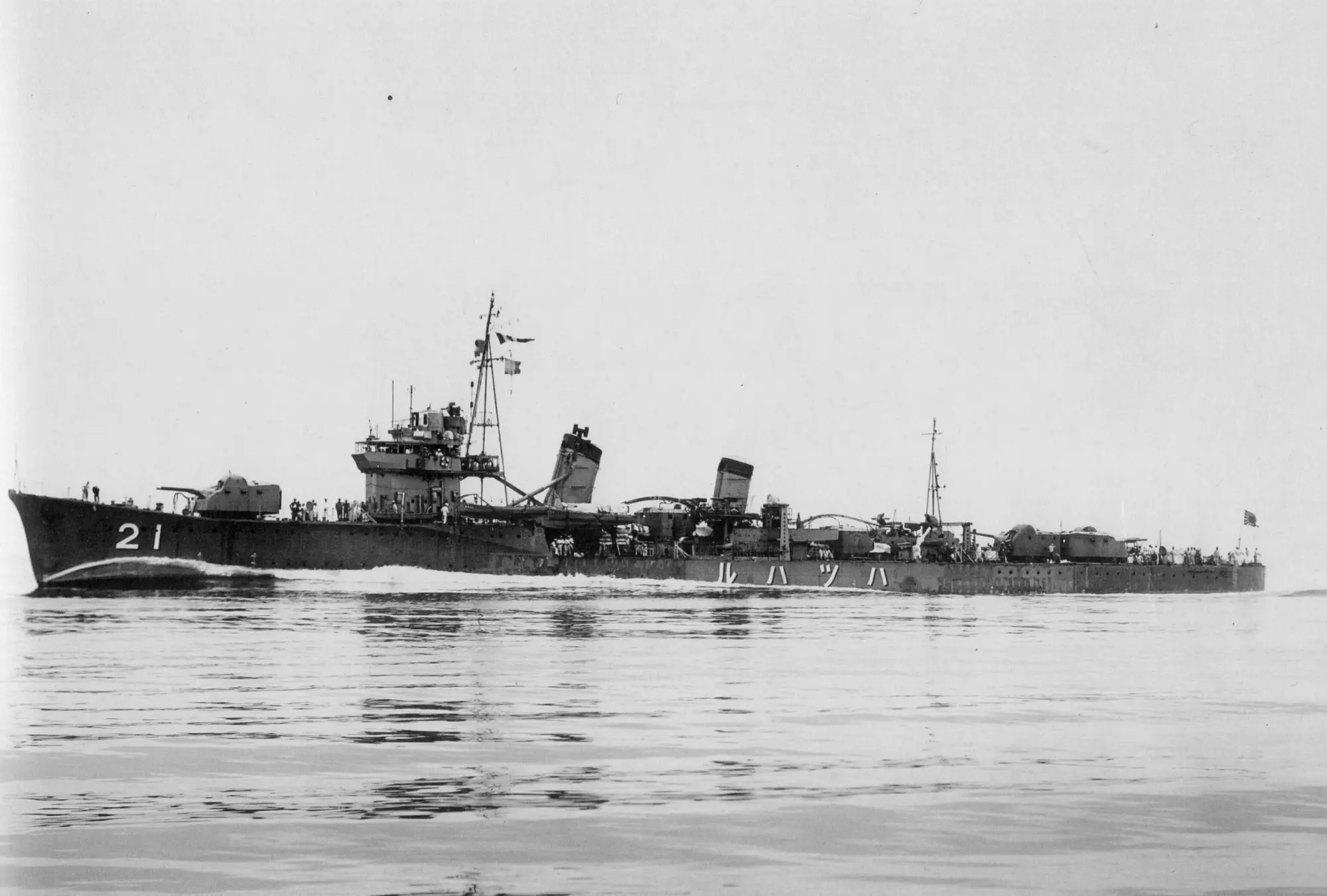
- Hatsuharu in 1934, after modifications to improve stability.

History

Empire of Japan
- Name: Hatsuharu
- Ordered: 1931 Fiscal Year
- Builder: Sasebo Naval Arsenal
- Laid down: 14 May 1931
- Launched: 27 February 1933
- Commissioned: 30 September 1933
- Stricken: 10 January 1945
- Fate: Sunk in action, 13 November 1944

General characteristics
- Class & type: Hatsuharu-class destroyer
- Displacement: 1,802 long tons (1,831 t)
- Length: 103.5 m (340 ft) pp, 105.5 m (346 ft) waterline; 109.5 m (359 ft) overall
- Beam: 10 m (32 ft 10 in)
- Draught: 3 m (9 ft 10 in)
- Propulsion: 2 shaft Kampon geared turbines; 3 boilers, 42,000 hp (31,000 kW)
- Speed: 36 knots (41 mph; 67 km/h)
- Range: 4,000 nmi (7,400 km) at 14 kn (26 km/h)
- Complement: 200
- Armament: (as built) 2 × 2, 1 × 1 - 12.7 cm/50 Type 3 naval gun; 2 × 1 - 40 mm AA guns; 3 × 3 - 61 cm (24 in) torpedo tubes; 18 × depth charges

Service record

Hatsuharu (初春, Early Spring), the second Imperial Japanese Navy destroyer of the name, was the lead ship of six Hatsuharu-class destroyers built under the Circle One Program (Maru Ichi Keikaku). Three were laid down in JFY 1931 and the next three in JFY 1933. The remaining six ships in the plan were built as the Shiratsuyu class.

== History ==
Construction of the advanced Hatsuharu-class destroyers was intended to give the Imperial Japanese Navy smaller and more economical destroyers than the previous Fubuki and Akatsuki-class destroyers, but with essentially the same weaponry. These conflicting goals proved beyond contemporary destroyer design, and the resulting ships were top-heavy design, with severe stability problems and with inherent structural weaknesses. After the "Tomozuru Incident" of 1934 and "IJN 4th Fleet Incident" in 1935, Hatsuharu underwent extensive modifications on completion to remedy these issues.

Hatsuharu-class destroyers used the same 50 caliber 12.7 cm gun as the Fubuki class, but all turrets could elevate to 75° to give the main guns a minimal ability to engage aircraft .

The 61 cm Type 90 torpedo was mounted in triple tube Type 90 Model 2 launchers It was traversed by an electro-hydraulic system and could traverse 360° in twenty-five seconds. If the backup manual system was used the time required increased to two minutes. Each tube could be reloaded in twenty-three seconds using the endless wire and winch provided. Hatsuharu was laid down on 14 May 1931, launched on 22 February 1933 and commissioned on 30 September 1933.

== Operational history ==
At the time of the attack on Pearl Harbor, Hatsuharu was assigned to Destroyer Division 21 of Destroyer Squadron 1 of the IJN 1st Fleet together with her sister ships Nenohi, Wakaba, and Hatsushimo, and remained in Japanese home waters on anti-submarine patrol. From the end of January 1942, she deployed with the invasion force for the Netherlands East Indies, covering landing operations at Kendari on Sulawesi as part of "Operation H" on 24 January. On 25 January, she was damaged in a collision with the cruiser Nagara and had to withdraw to Davao for emergency repairs. Once repairs were completed by 11 February, she escorted tankers to Balikpapan, Tarakan and Makassar, rejoining her squadron on 26 February and returning with her squadron to Sasebo at the end of March for maintenance.

From May 1942, Hatsuharu was reassigned to northern operations, and deployed from Ōminato Guard District with Abukuma as part of "Operation AL" in support of Admiral Boshiro Hosogaya's Northern Force in the Aleutians campaign, patrolling around Attu, Kiska and Amchitka Island until mid-July. After returning briefly to Yokosuka Naval Arsenal for maintenance, Hatsuharu continued to patrol in the Chishima Islands, deploying out of Paramushiro or Shumshu to Kiska, making transport runs to deploy supplies and reinforcements. On 17 October, while accompanied by the destroyer Oboro, Hatsuharu was attacked by USAAF Martin B-26 Marauder bombers off of Kiska. A direct bomb hit on her stern disabled her rudder, killing four crewmen and injuring 14 others. Oboro was sunk in the same attack, and Hatsuharu rescued 17 survivors. She limped back to Paramushiro on her own steam by 25 October

Hatsuharu was docked at Maizuru Naval Arsenal from 6 November 1942 through 30 September 1943, and during this refit, numerous 25 mm (0.98 in) Type 96 anti-aircraft guns and a Type 22 radar were added.

Repairs finally completed by 11 October 1943, Hatsuharu sortied with Hatsushimo as escort for the aircraft carriers Ryūhō and Chitose to Singapore. Likewise on 24 November, with Hatsushimo and Wakaba she escorted the carrier Hiyō, from Kure to Truk via Manila, Singapore, Tarakan and Palau, returning with the aircraft carriers Unyō and Zuihō to Yokosuka at the end of the year.

At the start of 1944, Hatsuharu was reassigned directly to Combined Fleet headquarters, and continued in escort missions between Yokosuka and Truk. She returned to northern waters from the end of February to the end of June, with additional 25 mm anti-aircraft guns added during maintenance refits at Ōminato at the end of May and Yokosuka at the end of June. In July, she made two troop transport runs to Iwo Jima as part of the Japanese preparations against the American landings. A Type 13 radar was added at the end of July. In August through October, she escorted troop convoys from Kure to Taiwan and Luzon.

On 24 October 1944, in the Battle of Leyte Gulf, Hatsuharu rescued 78 survivors from Wakaba, which had been sunk by aircraft from USS Franklin off the west coast of Panay.

In November, Hatsuharu deployed out of Manila to escort troop convoys to Ormoc on 1 November and 9 November. However, on the night of 13 November, after returning to Manila, Hatsuharu was caught in an air raid in Manila Bay. A series of near misses buckled plates and set fires, causing the ship to sink in shallow water (14°35′N 120°50′E). The attack killed 12 crewmen and injured 60 more, but 218 survived.

On 10 January 1945, Hatsuharu was removed from the navy list.
