= USS John D. Edwards =

Clemson-class destroyer

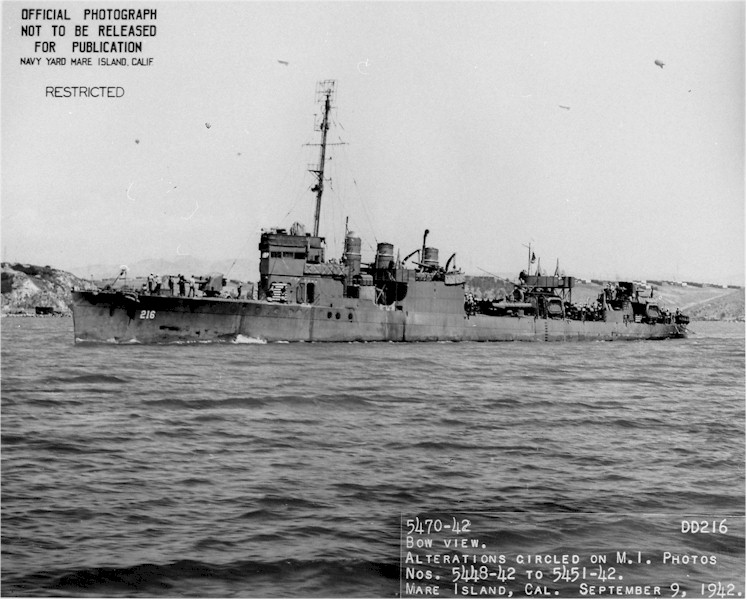
- USS John D. Edwards (DD-216)

History

United States
- Namesake: John D. Edwards
- Builder: William Cramp & Sons, Philadelphia
- Yard number: 482
- Laid down: 21 May 1919
- Launched: 18 October 1919
- Commissioned: 6 April 1920
- Decommissioned: 28 July 1945
- Stricken: 13 August 1945
- Fate: Sold for scrap, 30 November 1945

General characteristics
- Class & type: Clemson-class destroyer
- Displacement: 1,215 tons
- Length: 314 feet 4 inches (95.81 m)
- Beam: 31 feet (9.4 m)
- Draft: 9 feet 4 inches (2.84 m)
- Propulsion: 26,500 shp (20 MW); geared turbines, 2 screws
- Speed: 35 knots (65 km/h)
- Complement: 124 officers and enlisted
- Armament: 4 x 4 in (102 mm) guns, 1 x 3 in (76 mm) gun, 12 x 21 inch (533 mm) TT.

USS John D. Edwards (DD-216) was a Clemson-class destroyer in the United States Navy during World War II.

== Namesake ==
John D. Edwards was born on 2 August 1885 in Isle of Wight County, Virginia. He was appointed Midshipman in the Navy on 31 December 1908. During World War I, Lieutenant Edwards was assigned to destroyer USS Shaw in British waters. While escorting troopship HMS Aquitania into Southampton, England, Shaw collided with Aquitania. He was one of 12 men who lost their lives in the collision and was posthumously awarded the Navy Cross.

== Construction and commissioning ==
John D. Edwards was laid down 21 May and launched 18 October 1919 by William Cramp & Sons; sponsored by Mrs. May Marshall Edwards, widow of Lieutenant Edwards; and commissioned 6 April 1920.

== Service history ==
After shakedown, John D. Edwards departed Philadelphia 14 May 1920 to patrol in Turkish waters. With the Near East in turmoil, the destroyer evacuated refugees and furnished communication facilities for that area. She remained in Turkish waters until she sailed 2 May 1921 for duty with the Asiatic Squadron.

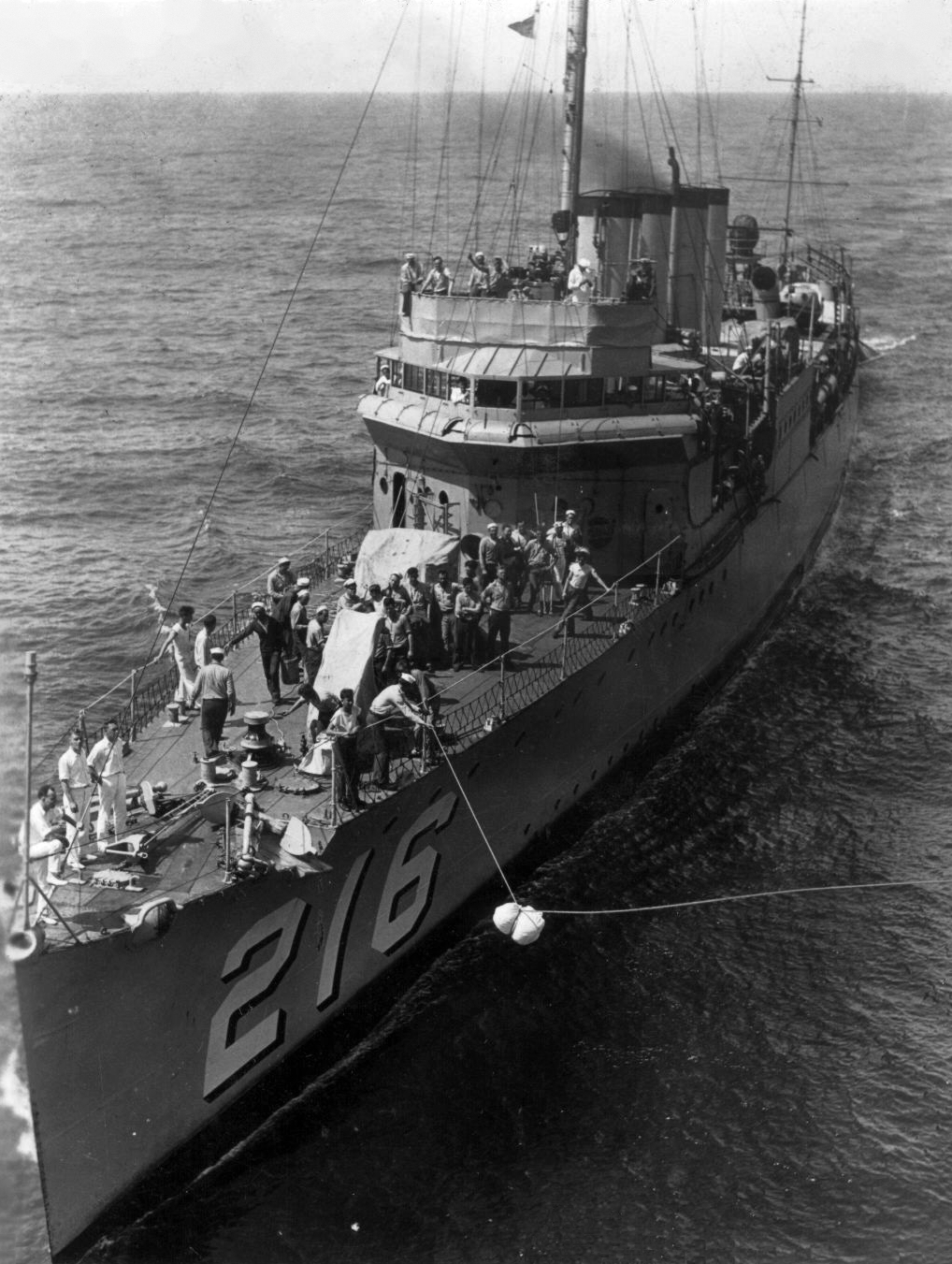
Laundry transfer with Saratoga off Cavite, in the 1930s.

Upon arrival at Cavite, Philippines, 29 June, Edwards immediately began patrols in the Far East. She was to remain there for four years operating out of the Philippines in the winter and China during the summer. She aided victims of the Japanese earthquake in 1923 and carried both food and rescue workers to Yokohama.

As the Chinese Civil War flared in 1924, the destroyer was on station to protect the rights of the foreigners in China. She departed the Far East 18 May 1925, arriving New York 13 July.

For the next three years, she operated out of Norfolk, Virginia making periodic training cruises along the United States East Coast and in the Caribbean. Following a Mediterranean cruise in late 1927, Edwards transited the Panama Canal and arrived at San Pedro, California, for service in the Pacific. She operated along the United States West Coast until 1 August 1929 when she sailed for the Far East, arriving Yokohama 26 August.

Edwards undertook a lengthy duty as part of the Asiatic Fleet. Operating out of the Philippines along the Chinese coast and off Japan, she guarded American interests during the Sino-Japanese War in the late 1930s, underwent training and battle practice, and operated with the Yangtze River Patrol, South China Sea Patrol, and the Neutrality patrols.

=== World War II ===
During the first two years of the 1940s, John D. Edwards increased operations with submarines in various training exercises. Shortly after the commencement of hostilities with Japan 7 December 1941, she departed Balik-papan, Borneo, to search for survivors of Prince of Wales. For the next two months she engaged in patrol, escort, and antisubmarine warfare operations in an attempt to halt the southward advance of powerful Japanese forces from the Philippines into the Netherlands East Indies. Assigned to Destroyer Squadron 29, she departed Bunda Roads, Madura Island, 4 February 1942. As part of a cruiser-destroyer striking force, she sailed for Makassar Strait to intercept a reinforced Japanese convoy heading for the Java Sea. That morning, Japanese bombers attacked the ships as the striking force steamed north of Bali. Despite antiaircraft fire, the planes carried out several attacks which heavily damaged Marblehead and Houston. Following the attack, Edwards escorted the damaged cruisers via Lombok Strait to Tjilatjap on the southern coast of Java.

The Japanese continued their push southward during the month of February. In mid-February, Edwards took part in the unsuccessful attempt to intercept a Japanese invasion convoy off Banka Strait in Palembang, Sumatra. Following this action, she steamed to the eastern coast of Bali to attack a Japanese destroyer-transport force in Badoeng Strait. During the early hours of 20 February, Edwards, accompanied by three other destroyers, engaged Japanese destroyers in a torpedo and gunfire battle that heavily damaged Michishio. The American destroyers returned to Surabaya, Java, later that day.

As part of the American-British-Dutch-Australian Command under Rear Admiral Karel Doorman, RN, Edwards engaged the Japanese Java Invasion Force 27 February in the Battle of the Java Sea; this engagement lasted for 7 hours. The Allies suffered a heavy defeat, losing a total of 5 ships in this battle (a further five were sunk in associated actions); the Japanese were able to invade and conquer Java.

After expending all torpedoes during the battle, Edwards returned to Surabaya to refuel. Accompanied by three other four-pipers, she departed for Australia after dark 28 February. While transiting Bali Strait during midwatch 1 March, the destroyers fought a brief duel with patrolling Japanese ships. Lacking torpedoes and low on ammunition, the American ships retreated, opened range and steamed southward for Fremantle where they arrived early in March.

For the next two months, Edwards escorted convoys out of Australia before arriving Pearl Harbor 1 June. She escorted convoys from Pearl Harbor to San Francisco, California until 15 June 1943 when she arrived at Brooklyn, New York to commence escort duty in the Atlantic. The destroyer cruised along the U.S. East Coast and to North Africa escorting supply ships during the next nine months.

For the rest of the war, Edwards escorted convoys in the Atlantic and trained submarines off the Canal Zone. Following the end of the conflict in Europe the destroyer arrived at Philadelphia 15 June 1945 and decommissioned there 28 July 1945. Edwards was sold to Boston Metal Company, Baltimore, Maryland, 30 November 1945.

== Awards ==
John D. Edwards received three battle stars for World War II service.

As of 2019, no other ship have been named John D. Edwards.
