= Battle of the Java Sea =

1942 naval battle on the Pacific campaign of WWII

- Part of the Pacific War
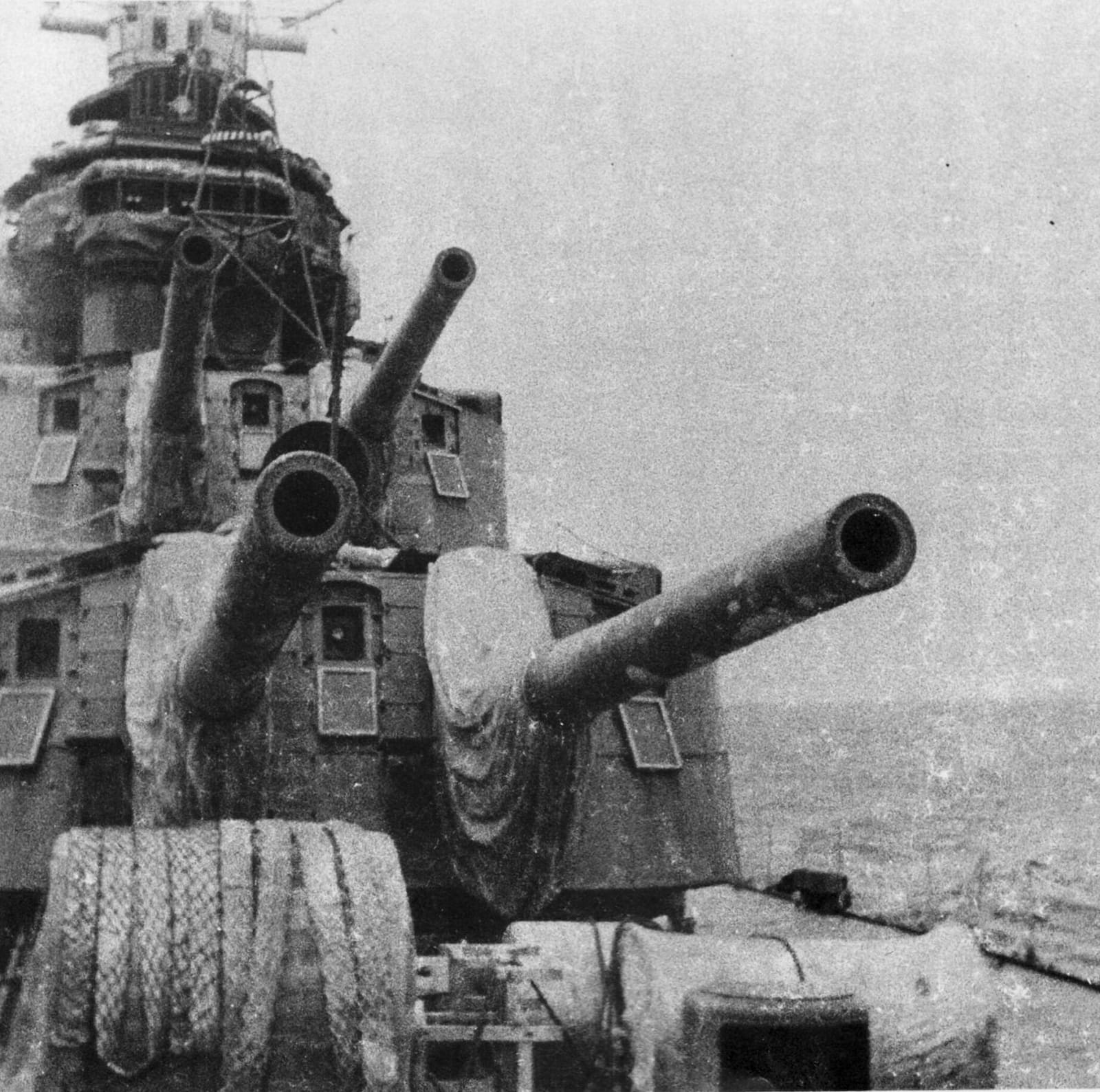
- The Japanese cruiser Haguro pictured after the battle
Date	27 February 1942
Location	Java Sea 5°0′S 111°0′E
Result	Japanese victory

Belligerents
Netherlands; United States; United Kingdom; Australia	Japan

Commanders and leaders
Karel Doorman †	(Empire of Japan) Takeo Takagi

Strength
2 heavy cruisers; 3 light cruisers; 9 destroyers	2 heavy cruisers; 2 light cruisers; 14 destroyers; 10 transports

Casualties and losses
2,300 killed; 2 light cruisers sunk; 3 destroyers sunk; 2 heavy cruisers damaged	36 killed; 3 destroyers damaged; 1 transport damaged

The Battle of the Java Sea (Indonesian: Pertempuran Laut Jawa, Japanese: スラバヤ沖海戦, romanized: Surabaya oki kaisen, lit. 'Sea Battle off Surabaya') was a decisive naval battle of the Pacific campaign of World War II.

Allied naval forces suffered a decisive defeat at the hands of the Imperial Japanese Navy on 27 February 1942. In secondary actions over successive days, starting when the Allies' Combined Striking Force (CSF) of two heavy cruisers, three light cruisers, and nine destroyers, led by Rear-Admiral Karel Doorman of the Royal Netherlands Navy, attempted to intercept a Japanese troop convoy in the Java Sea, only to be intercepted by the convoy's larger escort forces. The battle started as a stalemate, however the heavy cruiser Haguro changed the course of the battle when she crippled the heavy cruiser HMS Exeter with gunfire, then torpedoed and sank the destroyer HNLMS Kortenaer, sending Doorman's fleet into temporary disorder as the damaged Exeter withdrew. A gunfight between Allied and Japanese destroyers then resulted in the sinking of the destroyer HMS Electra and shell damage to her opponent Asagumo before Doorman's force turned away, ending the daylight engagement as dusk fell.

However, under the cover of night, Admiral Doorman's ships attempted another attack, during which the destroyer HMS Jupiter accidentally hit a Dutch mine and sank. Japanese floatplanes were shadowing the Allied fleet, allowing the Haguro and Nachi to ambush the Allied fleet with a long-range torpedo attack. One of Nachi's torpedoes hit the Dutch light cruiser Java, which was instantly blown apart and sank with almost all hands. One of Haguro's torpedoes hit the Allied flagship, the Dutch light cruiser De Ruyter, which sank to progressive flooding over several hours, killing Admiral Doorman.

The aftermath of the battle included several smaller actions around Java, including the smaller but also significant Battle of Sunda Strait, which saw the sinking of the heavy cruiser USS Houston, the light cruiser HMAS Perth, and the destroyer HNLMS Evertsen, and the second battle of the Java Sea, where the still crippled Exeter and her escorting destroyers were sunk by a Japanese squadron, including Haguro. These defeats led to the dissolution of the Allied fleet as a whole, the scuttling of the Dutch navy, and the Japanese occupation of the entire Dutch East Indies.

== Background ==
The Japanese invasion of the Dutch East Indies progressed at a rapid pace as the Japanese advanced from their Palau Islands colony and captured bases in Sarawak and the southern Philippines. They seized bases in eastern Borneo and in northern Celebes while troop convoys, screened by destroyers and cruisers with air support provided by swarms of fighters operating from captured bases, steamed southward through the Makassar Strait and into the Molucca Sea. Opposing the invading forces was a small force consisting of Dutch, American, British and Australian warships, many of them of World War I vintage, initially under the command of American Admiral Thomas C. Hart of ABDAFLOAT.

On 23–24 January 1942 a force of four American destroyers attacked a Japanese invasion convoy anchored in the Makassar Strait off Balikpapan, Borneo. On 13–16 February the Japanese attacked the major oil port of Palembang in eastern Sumatra. Japanese paratroopers fought a pitched battle against Allied defenders around the big Pladjoe oil plants, the largest and most valuable petrochemical installations in the East Indies. On the night of 19–20 February, an Allied force attacked the Japanese eastern invasion force off Bali resulting in the Battle of Badung Strait. Also on 19 February, the Japanese conducted two air raids on Darwin, on the Australian mainland, one from carrier-based planes and the other by land-based planes, rendering Darwin useless as a supply and naval base to support operations in the East Indies.

== Battle ==
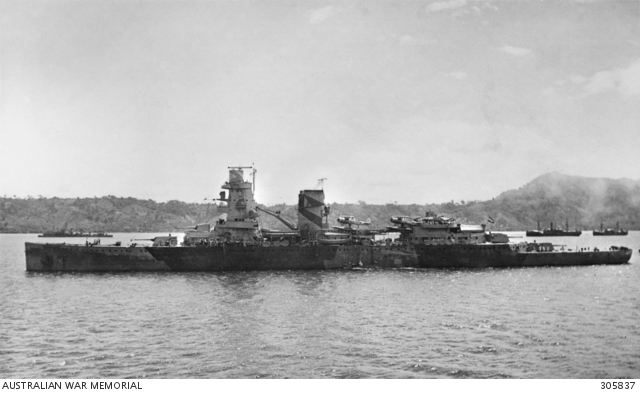
HNLMS De Ruyter at anchor in the bay at Oosthaven shortly before the battle, Admiral Doorman's flagship

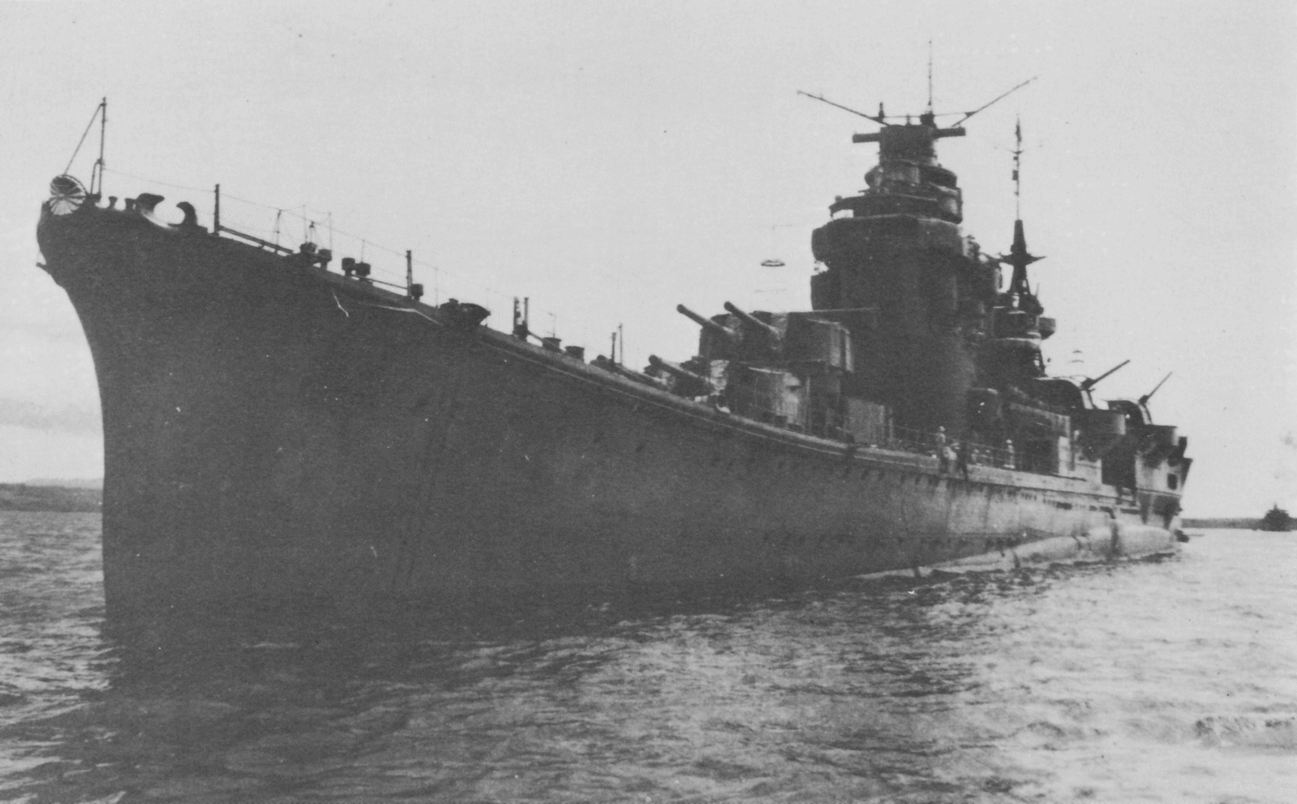
The heavy cruiser Nachi, Admiral Takagi's flagship

=== Prelude ===
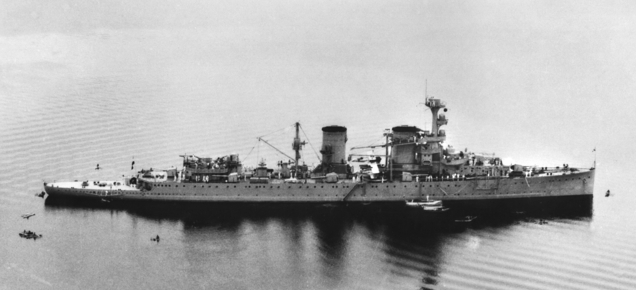
The light cruiser HNLMS Java at anchor, 5 February 1942

Japanese amphibious forces gathered to strike at Java, and on 27 February 1942 the main Allied naval force, under Rear Admiral Karel Doorman, sailed northeast from Surabaya to intercept a convoy of the Japanese eastern invasion force approaching from the Makassar Strait. The Allied eastern strike force consisted of two heavy cruisers (HMS Exeter and USS Houston), three light cruisers (Doorman's flagship HNLMS De Ruyter, HNLMS Java, HMAS Perth), and nine destroyers (HMS Electra, HMS Encounter, HMS Jupiter, HNLMS Kortenaer, HNLMS Witte de With, USS Alden, USS John D. Edwards, USS John D. Ford, and USS Paul Jones). While the force was formidable on paper, its combat effectiveness was questionable. Belonging to several different navies, the crews had practically no experience in each other's naval doctrine and fighting styles, and most crucially, there was a language barrier between the Dutch-speaking Karel Doorman and the English-speaking US, UK, and Australian ships, hindering communications.

Upon departure, the Allied force was immediately spotted by a Japanese floatplane launched from the convoy's main escort force, commanded by Rear Admiral Takeo Takagi. The main Japanese group consisted of the heavy cruisers Haguro and Nachi (the latter, Takagi's flagship, having launched the floatplane), and the destroyers Kawakaze, Yamakaze, Ushio, and Sazanami. This was supported by a second group led by Rear Admiral Shōji Nishimura, consisting of the light cruisers Naka and Jintsū and the destroyers Yūdachi, Samidare, Murasame, Harusame, Minegumo, and Asagumo. Upon learning of the opposing force's movements from Nachi, both groups sailed aside each other at 30 knots to intercept the opposing force. The Japanese heavy cruisers were armed with ten 203 mm (8-inch) guns each and the Type 93 torpedoes. By comparison, Exeter was armed with six 203 mm guns, and only six of Houston's nine 203 mm guns remained operable after her aft turret had been disabled in an earlier air attack. While underway, Nishimura's group was joined by the nearby destroyers Yukikaze, Amatsukaze, Hatsukaze, and Tokitsukaze, before being attacked by land-based Dutch aircraft and B-17 bombers, resulting in no damage to the fleet. Captain Tameichi Hara aboard Amatsukaze noted that the planes attacked the Japanese warships, confirming their goal was to mow through the protection force before attacking the convoy, and believed it to have been a mistake for the planes to have not attacked the troopships.

The next day, Doorman's force was tracked by Nachi's floatplane while the Japanese fleet rigorously practiced in preparation for the coming engagement. Updates from Nachi's floatplane worried the Japanese, as Doorman's ships were in a position to pounce on the vulnerable transport ships, but Doorman ordered his fleet to turn South to refuel at Surabaya. However, upon receiving reports of the Japanese fleet, Doorman immediately turned his ships back to attack the enemy. These actions, perhaps somewhat misunderstood, came as a relief to Admiral Takagi, who Captain Hara recalled saying "The enemy ships were staying clear of our air raids on Surabaya, the enemy is in no shape to fight us." He ordered the convoy to turn around and the escort ships to form up into a fighting formation.

=== Afternoon battle ===
At 15:48 on 27 February 1942, Amatsukaze's chief spotter Shigeru Iwata located Doorman's fleet at 31,600 yards. Captain Hara watched through his binoculars, clearly recognizing De Ruyter's masts as the fleet quickly became visible to the other ships. Admiral Doorman aboard De Ruyter in turn located the enemy force, with a brief scare due to a mistaken claim of battleships in the enemy formation, which was quickly corrected. Still, the Allies could not make out any targets besides Haguro and Nachi due to poor optical systems. Additionally, only the Exeter carried any form of radar, further hindering identification. Still, Doorman ordered his ships to turn west, hoping to prevent the Japanese fleet from crossing his T. With both fleets thereafter sailing in a parallel course. Haguro and Nachi, which were trailing behind the other ships, could catch up to Nishimura's group.

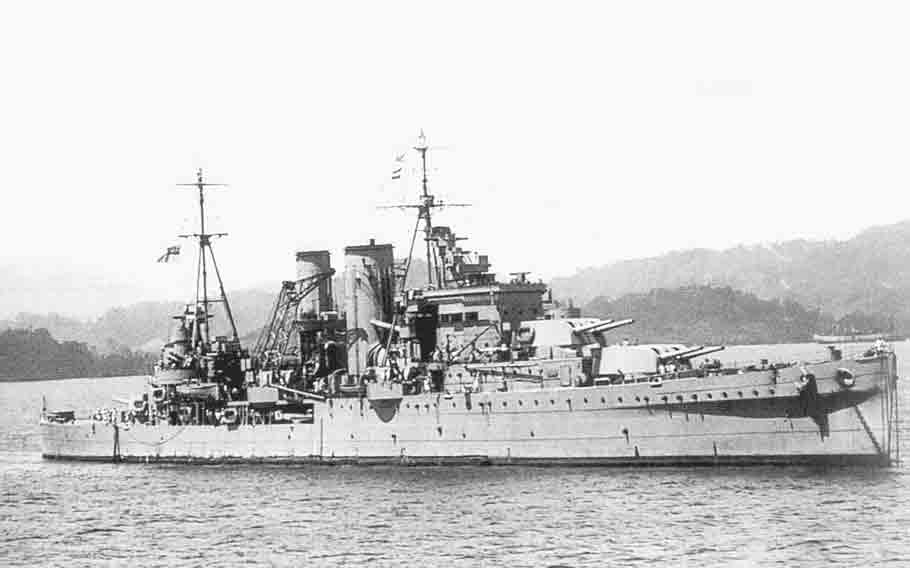
HMS Exeter anchored off Sumatra in preparation for the battle

By 16:00, spotters on the Electra noticed Jintsū, leading Yukikaze, Amatsukaze, Hatsukaze, and Tokitsukaze, at 16,000 yards, and her 120 mm (4.7-inch) guns fired the first shots of the battle, closely followed by all the cruisers and several destroyers. All Allied ships fired on Jintsū, straddling her several times, yet none hit. Naka and her group of destroyers returned fire at 24,000 yards, and their shells also missed. Both sides rapidly closed the distance and Nishimura, frustrated by the ineffective gunfire, ordered Naka and his destroyers to fire torpedoes at 15,000 yards, letting out 43 torpedoes. A few exploded after running a few thousand yards; the rest missed. Nishimura's hastiness to engage at long range was later criticized by the Japanese Admiralty due to the sheer amount of wasted ammunition. Recognizing this flaw, Takagi ordered all ships to close the range and charge the enemy as he watched his heavy cruisers blast away at long range.

==== Initial hits ====
Exeter, Houston, and Perth all fired on Haguro and initially claimed to have blown up and sunk her. In fact, Haguro was untouched, and together with Nachi scored the first hits of the battle. Haguro focused her gunfire on De Ruyter, striking her with a 203 mm shell that blasted apart her auxiliary motor room, starting a fire that killed one crewman and injured six others, and another which punched through De Ruyter's unarmored portions without exploding. Meanwhile, Nachi focused her fire on Houston, which Nachi succeeded in hitting with two 203 mm shells, one punching through her bow and the other holing her stern, which ruptured an oil tank.

Jintsū leading a line of destroyers—Yukikaze, Tokitsukaze, Amatsukaze, Hatsukaze, Ushio, Sazanami, Yamakaze, and Kawakaze—closed the range by Takagi's order, in the hope of enabling more accurate torpedo salvos. Electra switched fire to the cluster as 150 mm (5.9-inch) shells from De Ruyter continued to rain on the column. One of Electra's 120 mm shells hit Tokitsukaze, causing thick white smoke to burst out of the ship, blinding Amatsukaze behind her. A near miss from De Ruyter lightly damaged Amatsukaze's hull and dashed water on her bridge. However, neither destroyer was critically damaged. In turn, the destroyers engaged in a gunfight with De Ruyter, but scored no hits. Yukikaze and Tokitsukaze first fired 16 torpedoes at 6,000 yards, followed closely by Amatsukaze, and then the five other destroyers behind her. A total of 70 torpedoes were fired, yet none hit.

==== Torpedo attack by Haguro ====
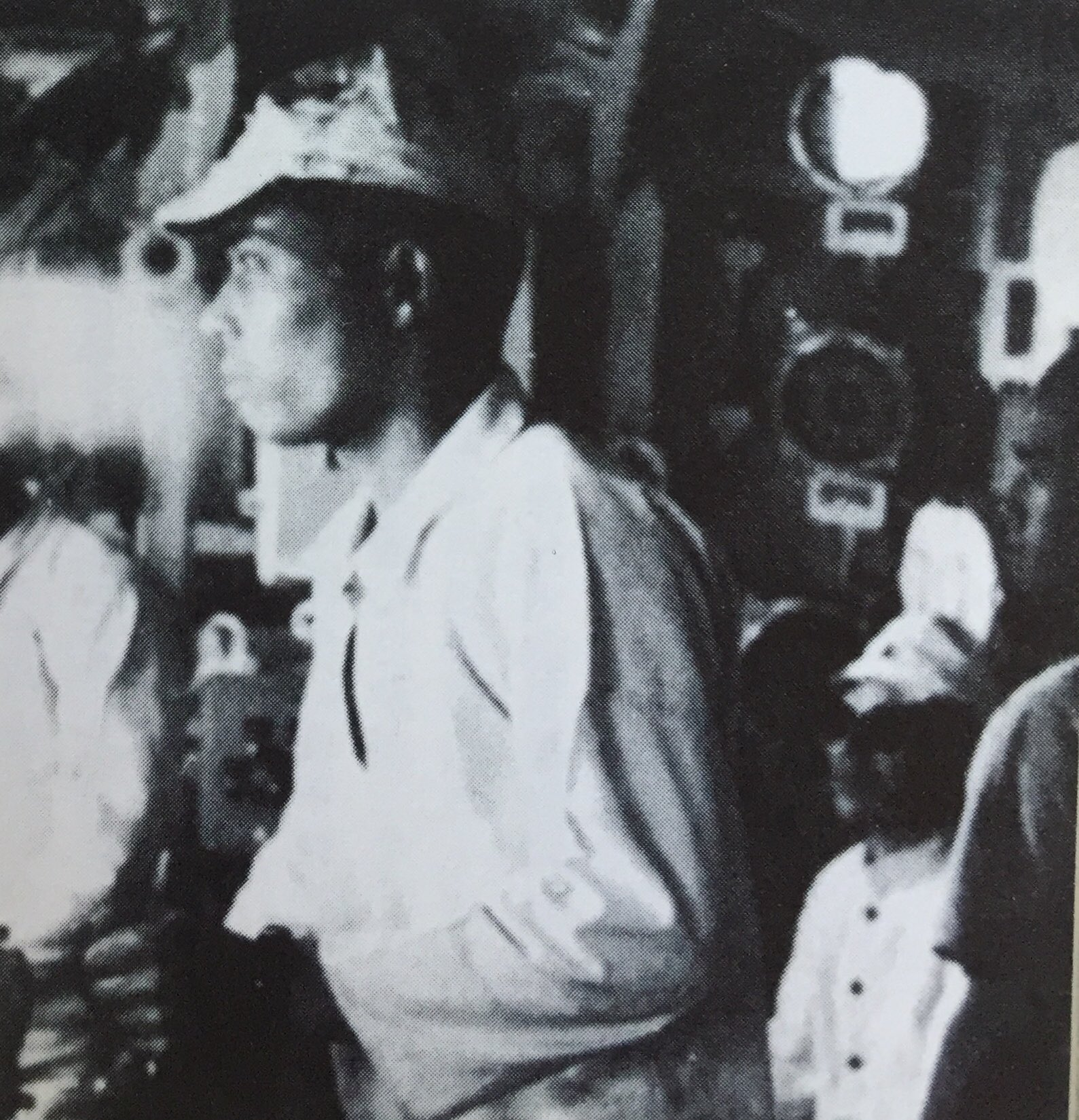
The Haguro's steering room during the battle

Though the torpedoes did not hit, they prompted the Allied fleet to maneuver, enabling Haguro to switch fire from De Ruyter to the Exeter, with Exeter responding back. Engaging each other at 22,000 yards, Exeter's gunnery was poor, managing only a straddle by the 8th salvo. Haguro proved more effective, first scoring an 203 mm hit to Exeter's stern below the waterline, which lifted the ship and caused considerable flooding. Another salvo from Haguro resulted in a devastating hit on Exeter when an 203 mm shell gouged into Exeter's engine. It exploded and destroyed six of Exeter's eight boilers, killing 40 men as her speed dropped to 5 knots. Doorman's fleet then maneuvered chaotically, as, when Exeter began to fall out of formation, Houston, Perth, and Java all followed her, assuming they had missed a command from Doorman, leaving De Ruyter charging alone at the enemy fleet before joining the other cruisers. Simultaneously, Haguro fired a spread of 8 torpedoes and continued to engage. The British destroyers Jupiter, Encounter, and Electra came to assist the crippled Exeter as Doorman's cruisers began to turn away, laying a smokescreen in an attempt to hide the disorganized formation.

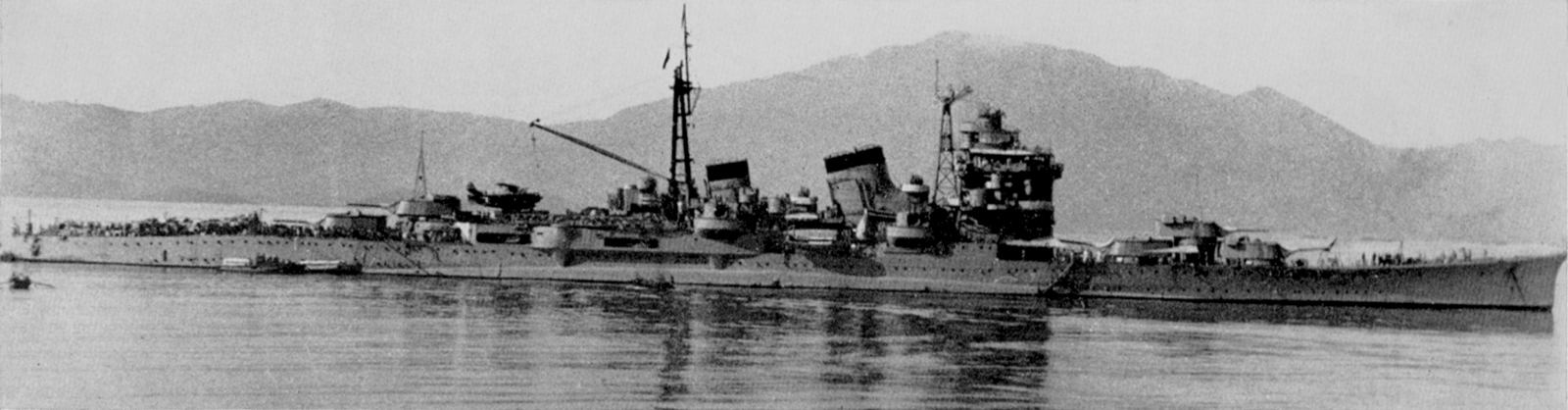
Haguro at anchor in 1940

Up to this point, the battle of the Java Sea had been something of a stalemate, with both sides missing their shots due to extreme range and inflicting minor damage with the few hits scored. Haguro's hit on Exeter was only the beginning of Doorman's misfortune. In an ironic twist, the only Japanese torpedo to make its mark during the course of the afternoon battle was one of Haguro's launched at extreme range and hitting home 15 minutes after firing, striking the Dutch destroyer Kortenaer. Within moments of the hit, the destroyer broke apart and sank with the loss of 66 men. Launched at a distance of 22,000 yards, this hit by Haguro was probably the longest-range torpedo hit in naval history.

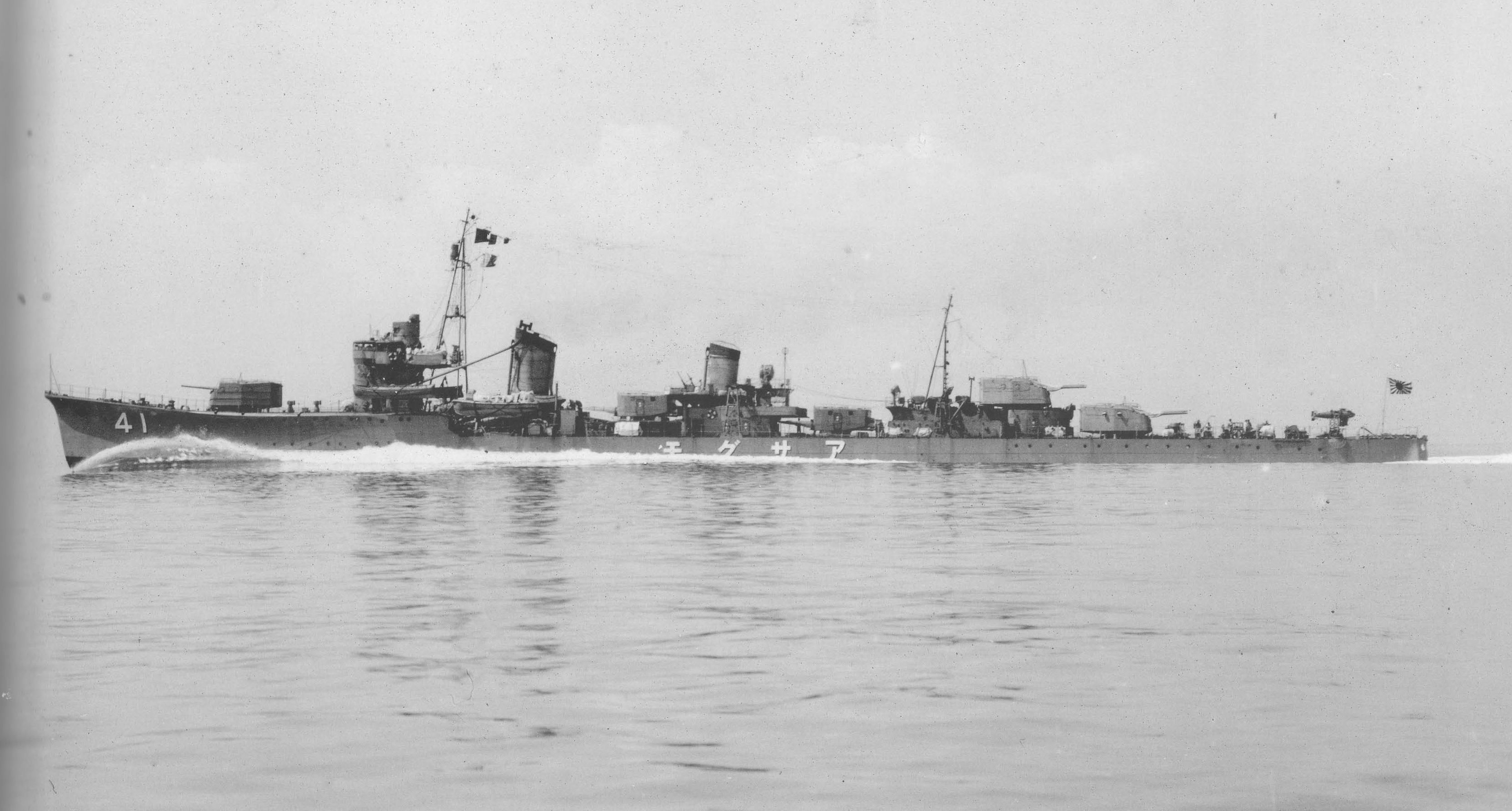
Asagumo underway in September 1939

==== Destroyer on destroyer action ====
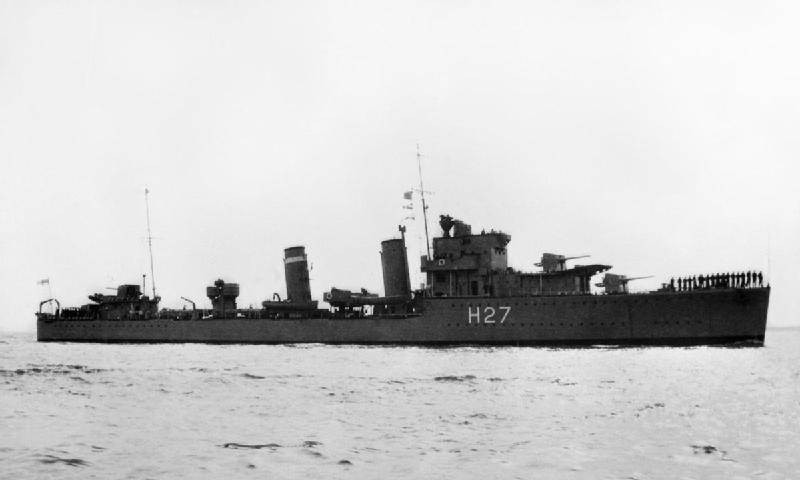
HMS Electra on parade

The American destroyers Alden, John C Edwards, John C Ford, and Paul Jones fired their torpedoes at Haguro and Nachi, but none hit. Simultaneously, the British destroyers attempting to cover the crippled Exeter were engaged by the Japanese destroyers Asagumo and Minegumo. The latter stayed at a longer range and attacked Jupiter and Encounter, lightly damaging them with near misses, but failed to score any direct hits. Asagumo and Electra, by contrast, engaged each other at point-blank range. Asagumo took several 120 mm shells, temporarily leaving her dead in the water, killing five sailors and injuring 16 others. Asagumo, however, inflicted more damage than she received, a hail of 127 mm shells destroyed Electra's A and X turrets, engine room, communications, and electrical power, and setting Electra on fire. Electra let out a spread of eight torpedoes at her opponent, but none hit, and in response Minegumo switched fire from the other destroyers and joined Asagumo in pounding the already crippled Electra. Western sources sometimes credit Jintsū with assisting Asagumo, but Japanese records do not support this. Electra's remaining guns were destroyed, flooding overwhelmed damage control, and fires burned out of control under Asagumo's and Minegumo's bombardment. Electra's crew abandoned ship and left her to sink. Encounter and Jupiter had been repelled by Minegumo's gunfire and retreated to assist Exeter.

=== Allied retreat ===
After almost two hours of fighting, Doorman's ships had not even come close to attacking the Japanese troop convoy. One of his cruisers was crippled, two more were damaged, and he had two destroyers sunk, while his ships, with their poor gunnery, had managed only to moderately damage one destroyer and lightly damage two others. He still wanted to attack the convoy, but recognized that he simply could not under the current conditions. Doorman thus decided to cut his losses and regroup whilst retiring in the general direction of Surabaya, which led Takagi to mistakenly believe the Allied ships were retreating to port. The limping Exeter, no longer in condition to contribute further to the battle, was ordered to break off from the force, taking Witte de With with her as escort into Surabaya. However, after nightfall, the remainder of Doorman's ships changed direction and steamed back toward the convoy.

==== Routing of Allied destroyers ====
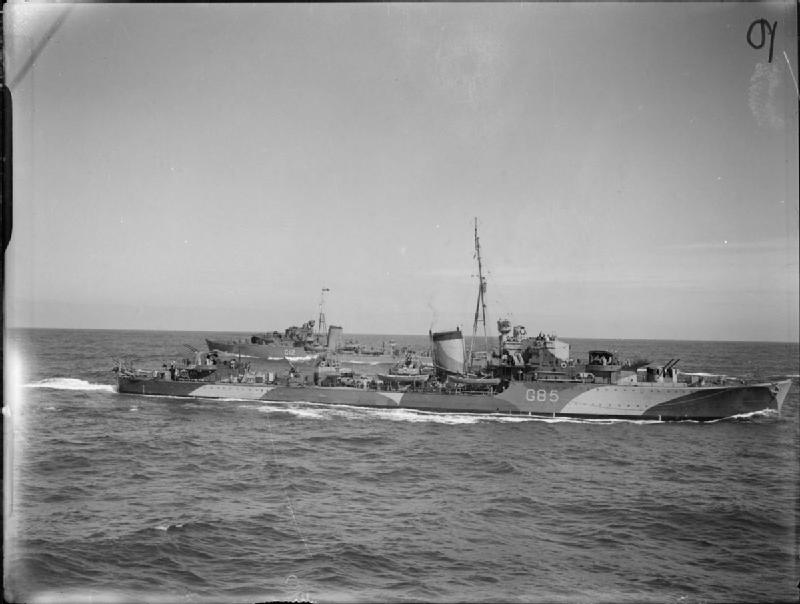
HMS Jupiter underway in August 1940

Then, after much maneuvering for position, the plan began to backfire. The four American destroyers were dangerously low on fuel and had completely expended their torpedoes and were thus limited to gun armament only. At around 21:15 the American destroyers accordingly detached from Doorman's fleet to retire to Surabaya. Again Doorman decided to absorb the losses and continue on. However, at about 21:25 while sailing west along the coast of Java, Jupiter, one of Doorman's two remaining destroyers, hit a mine and sank with the loss of 84 men. The mine that sank Jupiter is generally thought to have been lain by the Dutch minelayer Gouden Leeuw. Shortly thereafter, around 22:00 while headed north, the fleet passed through the former battlegrounds and sighted men in the water. Encounter was ordered to pick up the survivors, who turned out to be 113 men from the earlier sinking of Kortenaer, and after doing so retired to Surabaya. Doorman was thus left without any destroyers, leaving him with the heavy cruiser Houston and light cruisers De Ruyter, Java, and Perth. Despite this, Doorman continued the advance.

=== Night ambush ===
Unknown to Doorman, a floatplane from Haguro had been shadowing his force. After the daylight battle, Takagi believed he had secured a victory as his ships made post-battle reformations. Asagumo's crew conducted temporary repairs following her gunfight with Electra, getting the engine back up and running as she regained speed, retiring from the engagement and taking Minegumo to escort her. Haguro and Nachi stopped in the water to recover their floatplanes, which had been catapulted before the battle. While this was being conducted, one of Haguro's floatplanes still in the air reported Doorman's fleet turning back, much to Takagi's shock.

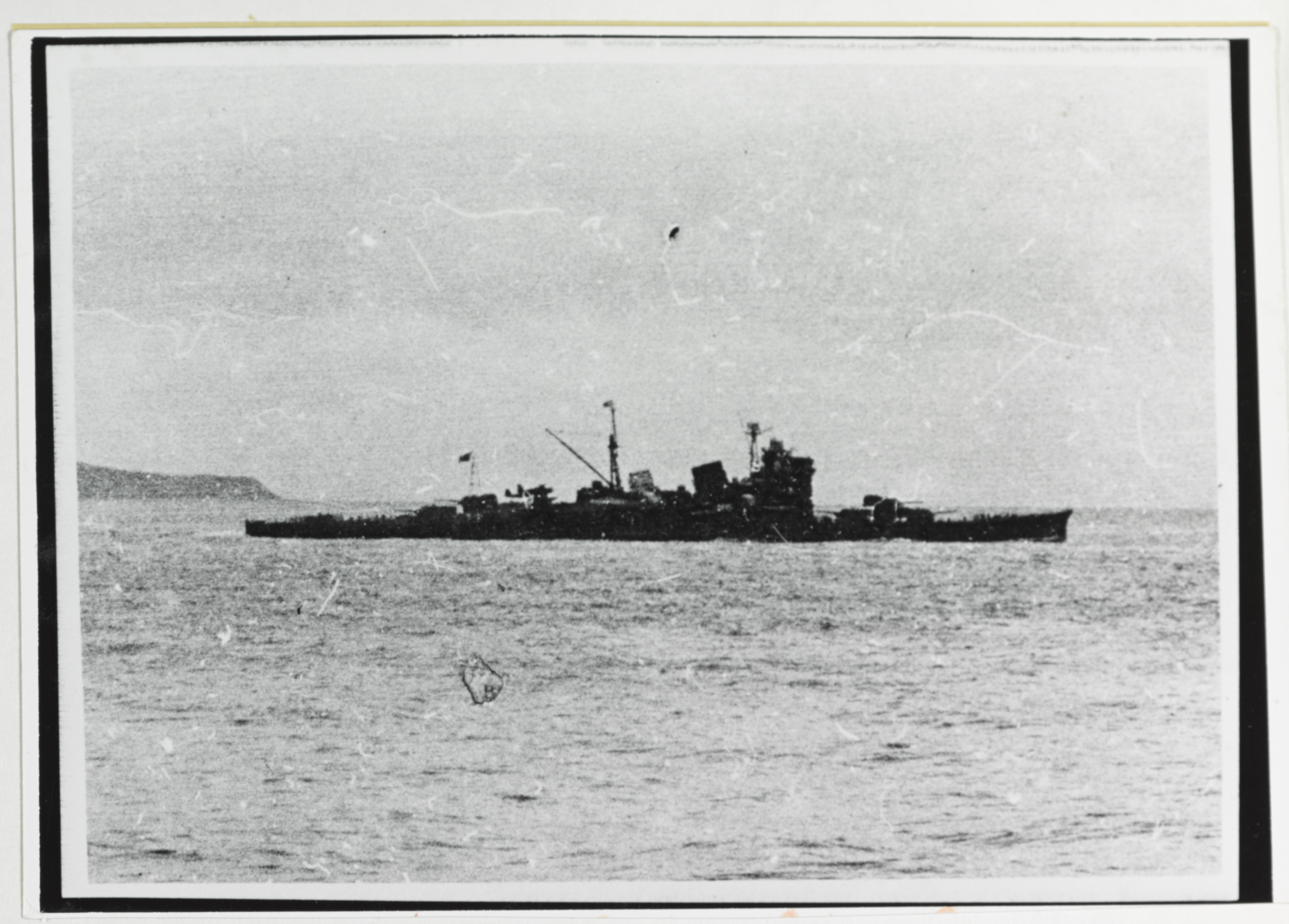
Nachi anchored off Ōminato on 13 November 1943

Haguro and Nachi picked up speed and raced to engage the enemy yet again. Haguro's floatplane this time tracked Doorman's movement, which were now far more predictable than earlier in the battle. It was just before midnight that the Japanese optical systems picked up the enemy force at long range. Steaming at maximum speed, Haguro and Nachi closed to 16,000 yards. Low on ammunition for their main guns, they opted for a stealthy torpedo attack, in which Nachi unleashed eight torpedoes, and Haguro four.

The Allied fleet detected Nachi's torpedoes at 23:32 and took evasive action, but Java, at the end of the battle line, did not turn fast enough. A torpedo struck near her stern and ignited her magazine. The resulting explosion blew off 30 metres (98 ft) of her stern and heat was felt on board other ships in formation. Damage control was hopeless, and she sank in about 15 minutes. Only 19 crewmembers survived.

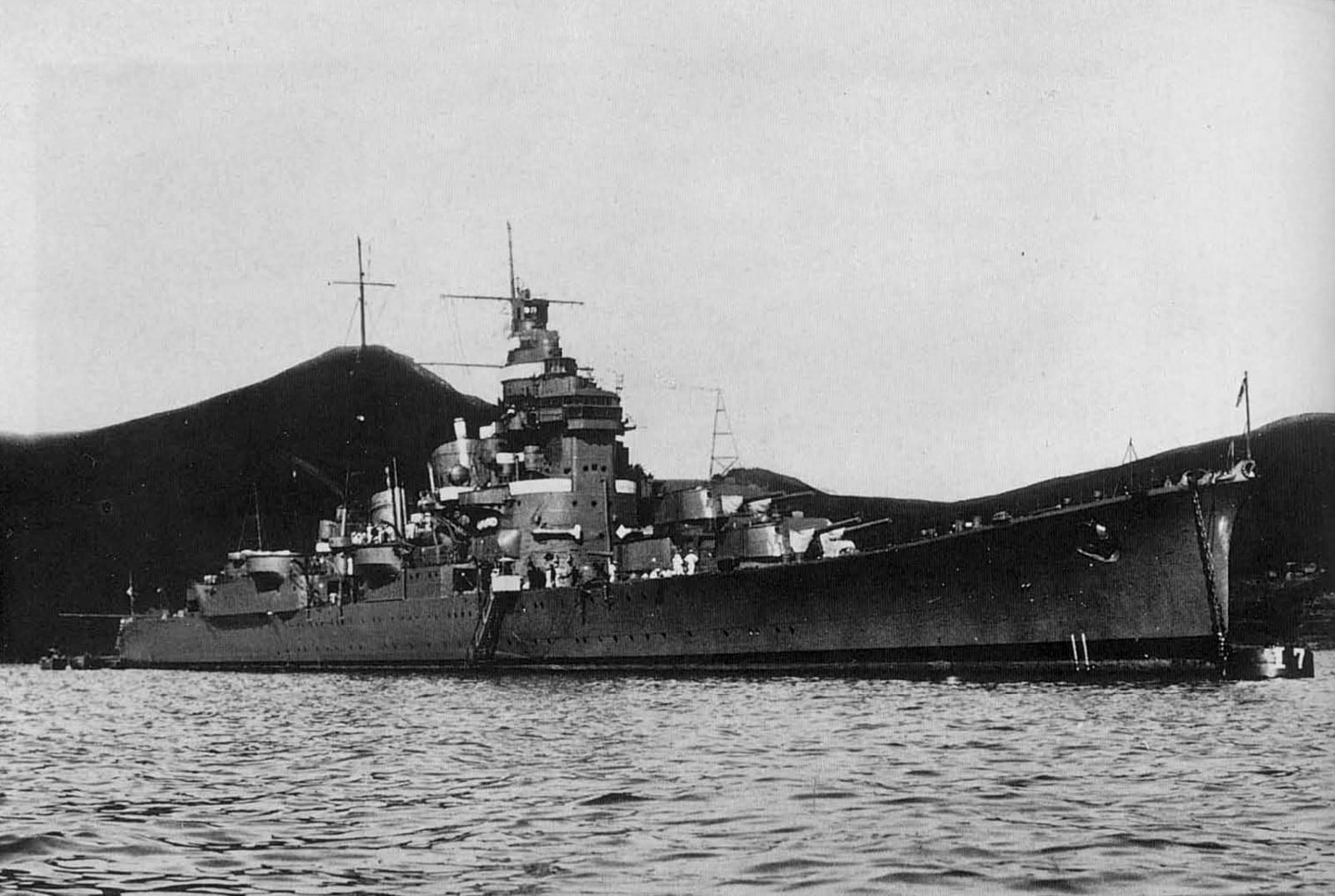
Haguro under refit in 1936.

Four minutes later, one of Haguro's torpedoes hit the De Ruyter, resulting in the loss of all power as the cruiser was left dead in the water with significant flooding. Additionally, a massive fire broke out and enveloped the cruiser. Haguro's torpedo hit killed much of De Ruyter's damage-control crew, and the total loss of power disabled much of De Ruyter's damage-control equipment, meaning the massive fire could spread throughout the ship. Simultaneously, flooding slowly overwhelmed damage control and De Ruyter's list steadily increased. Over a period of three hours, fires and flooding overwhelmed De Ruyter as she capsized and sank with the loss of 367 men. Admiral Doorman and Captain Eugène Lacomblé decided to go down with the ship.

Shouts of "Banzai" could be heard from Haguro's and Nachi's decks as crew members leaped for joy and hugged each other in excitement. Admiral Takagi chose not to attack with gunfire afterwards, knowing Java and De Ruyter were already fatally damaged. The pair steamed out of the area to reinforce the invasion convoy. Depending on the source, they were either undetected, or were spotted but untouched by ineffective gunfire. With Doorman dead, Houston and Perth abandoned the mission and retreated. Meanwhile, as the US destroyers evacuated the battlefield they ran into Amatsukaze and Hatsukaze. Both sides exchanged fire, but no hits were scored and the US destroyers continued on their path while Amatsukaze and Hatsukaze regrouped with the fleet.

With almost all of their ships sunk or damaged, the remaining Allied warships halted all offensive actions and attempted to flee the vicinity, leaving the Dutch East Indies to the invaders. The Japanese convoys continued to Surabaya unmolested, aside from an air raid that damaged a single troopship. All the Allies had accomplished was that the troops on Java received a one-day respite, which ultimately changed nothing. Perth and Houston proceeded to Tanjung Priok, arriving later that day. However, oil shortages meant they could be only half fueled, and they received no new ammunition.

== Aftermath ==
After their victory, the Japanese fleet while returning to the invasion convoy stumbled upon the Dutch hospital ship SS Op Ten Noort as she was sailed to the battle scene to rescue survivors. Op Ten Noort was halted by Murasame and Amatsukaze. Upon inspection, there were no patients on the ship, only crew and staff, and in response Amatsukaze was ordered to escort Op Ten Noort to Singapore, where she would be converted into a prison ship. While underway, Amatsukaze and Hatsukaze crippled the submarine USS Perch, enabling her to be finished off by the destroyers Ushio and Sazanami, then Amatsukaze fatally wounded the Dutch submarine K-10, forcing her scuttling in Surabaya the next day.

While traversing the Java Sea, Witte de With was damaged by land-based Japanese aircraft and forced to retire for Surabaya. She was replaced by the destroyer USS Pope in escorting the crippled Exeter to safety.

=== Battle of Sunda Strait ===
Perth and Houston were at Tanjung Priok on 28 February when they received orders to sail through Sunda Strait to Tjilatjap. Materiel was running short in Java, and neither was able to rearm or fully refuel. Departing at 19:00 on 28 February for the Sunda Strait, they encountered the main Japanese invasion fleet for West Java in Bantam Bay and were engaged by the groups escorting destroyers. The initial torpedo spreads fired from the Fubuki, Shirayuki, Hatsuyuki, and Asakaze all missed, and in turn Perth hit Shirayuki with a 152 mm (6-inch) shell to her bridge. However, the arrival of the convoy's other escorts, the heavy cruisers Mogami and Mikuma, the light cruiser Natori, and the destroyers Murakumo, Shirakumo, and Shikinami quickly changed the tide of battle.

Mogami and Mikuma blasted Houston, crippling her with 30 shell hits and two torpedo hits, though in turn Mikuma was hit by 203 mm shells that temporarily disabled electrical power. Simultaneously, Perth became the focus of the escorting destroyers and fired at the Harukaze, which she damaged with three dud 152 mm shell hits, while Harukaze hit Perth with a torpedo that destroyed her forward engine room, followed two minutes later by another torpedo from the Shirakumo that flooded her bow, then two more torpedoes from Murakumo which finished her off; the crew quickly abandoned ship and left Perth to sink over 20 minutes. Meanwhile, the crippled Houston was attacked by the Shikinami, which hit the cruiser with a torpedo that resulted in the abandon-ship order being issued and Houston to sink.

During the action, a spread of torpedoes from Mogami that missed the Allied cruisers accidentally hit and sank the minesweeper W-2, the transport ships Sakura Maru and Tatsuno Maru, the depot ship Shinshu Maru, and the hospital ship Horai Maru; more damage to Japanese forces than any of the Allied ships managed to inflict. Tatsuno Maru and Shinshu Maru were later raised and repaired.

The Dutch destroyer HNLMS Evertsen had been scheduled to depart Tanjung Priok with the cruisers, but was delayed, and she followed them about two hours later. Her crew sighted the gunfire of the main action, and her captain managed to evade the Japanese main force. However, Evertsen was then engaged by the Murakumo and Shirakumo in the Strait. On fire and in a sinking condition after at least seven 127 mm shell hits, Evertsen grounded herself on a reef near Sebuku Island. The surviving crew abandoned ship just as the aft magazine exploded and the destroyer fully sank.

=== Second Battle of the Java Sea ===
The Exeter, still badly damaged from Haguro's shell hit, was continuing for safety in Ceylon, and had traversed almost the entire Java Sea alongside the destroyers Encounter and Pope, only to be located at 10:00 on 1 March by the heavy cruisers Myōkō and Ashigara and their escorting destroyers, and engaged in a two-hour-long gun battle that had no hits scored on either side. Just before 12:00, the battle-experienced Haguro and Nachi arrived on the scene and opened fire, and 4 minutes later Exeter was finally hit by an 203 mm shell that destroyed what was left of her boilers. Gunfire from the cruisers destroyed her electrical power and guns, and set her on fire, leading to the crew scuttling Exeter. Almost entirely out of ammo, Haguro and Nachi finally withdrew, while the destroyers Kawakaze and Yamakaze bombarded Encounter, scoring hits that destroyed her steering gear and caused her to lose speed, and as Myōkō and Ashigara joined into the pounding, Encounter was sunk to overwhelming gunfire. Pope initially escaped, only to be crippled by aircraft from the light carrier Ryūjō and finished off by gunfire from Myōkō and Ashigara.

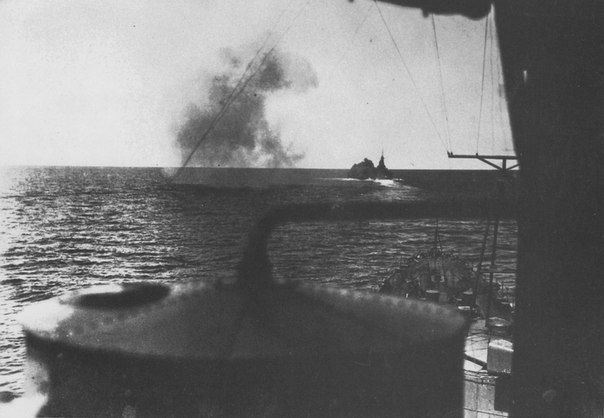
Myōkō and Ashigara engaging the limping Exeter, 1 March 1942

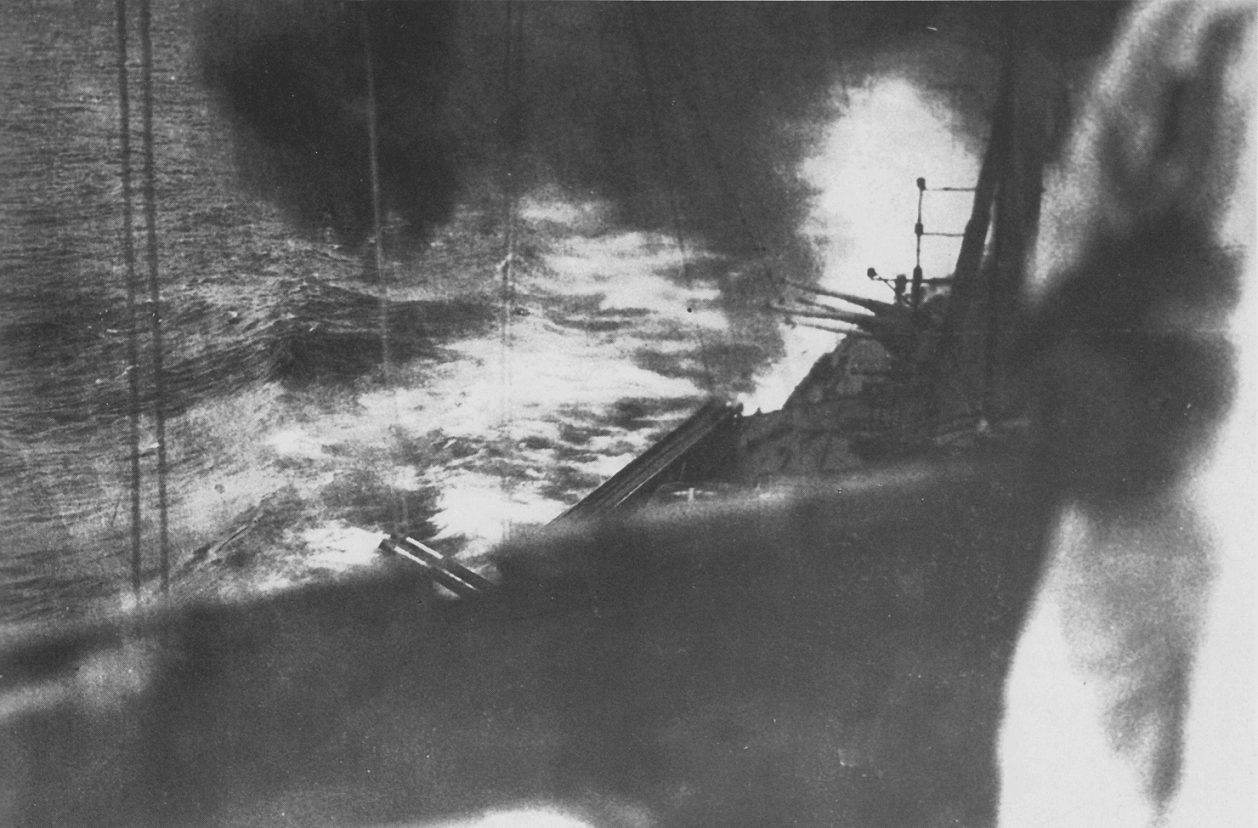
Myōkō firing her aft 8-inch (203 mm) guns

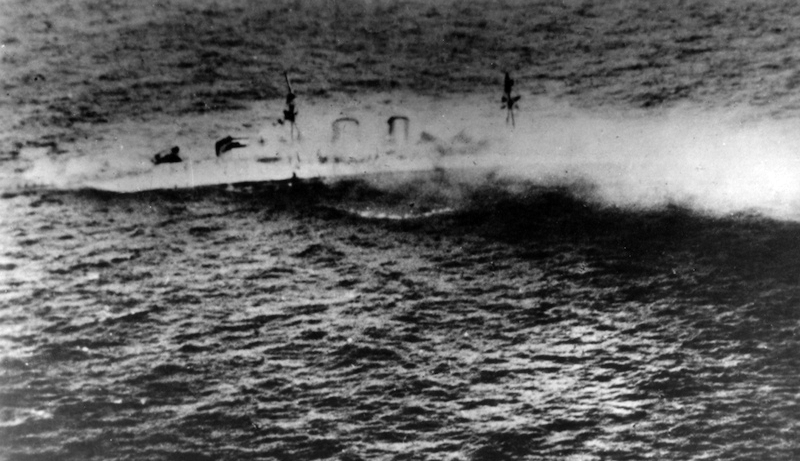
Exeter sinking, taken from Myōkō's floatplane

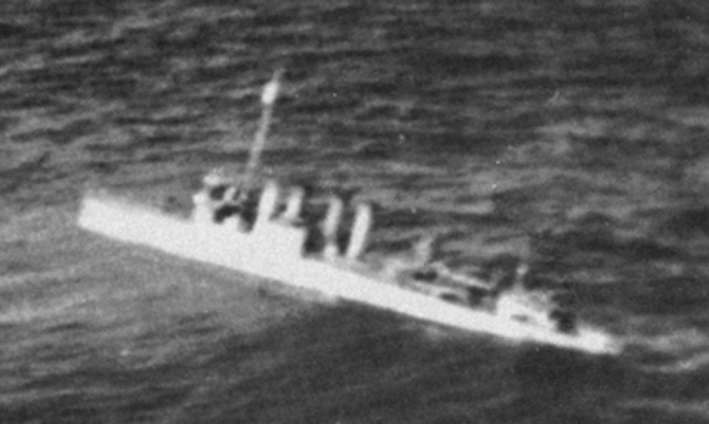
USS Pope capsizing to starboard

=== Destruction of the ABDA fleet ===
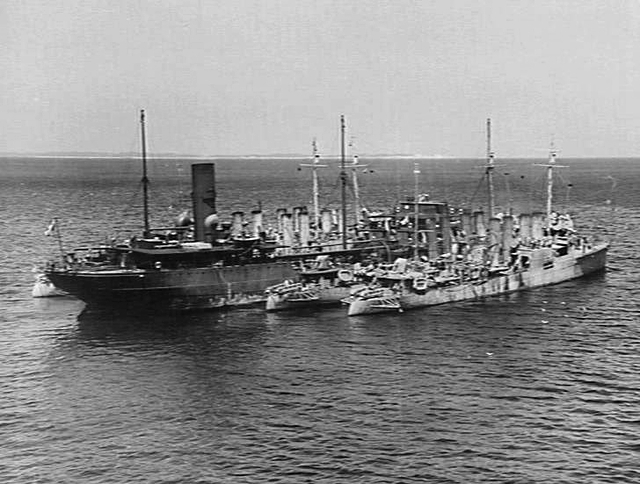
The surviving American destroyers being refueled by USS Victoria upon reaching Australia, March 1942

With the complete destruction of Admiral Doorman's fleet across the battles of the Java Sea and Sunda Strait, and the death of Doorman himself, the ABDA fleet as a whole was completely disbanded. The surviving ABDA fleet warships fled the crumbling Dutch East Indies in hopes of reaching the safety of Australia. Many reached the ports of Sydney and Darwin successfully; among these lucky ships were the only Allied survivors of the Java Sea battle, the four American destroyers John D. Edwards, John D. Ford, Alden, and Paul Jones, which while underway in the Bali Strait encountered the Japanese destroyers Hatsuharu, Nenohi, Wakaba, and Hatsushimo, and after a brief gunfight which inflicted no damage to either side, successfully escaped to Fremantle.

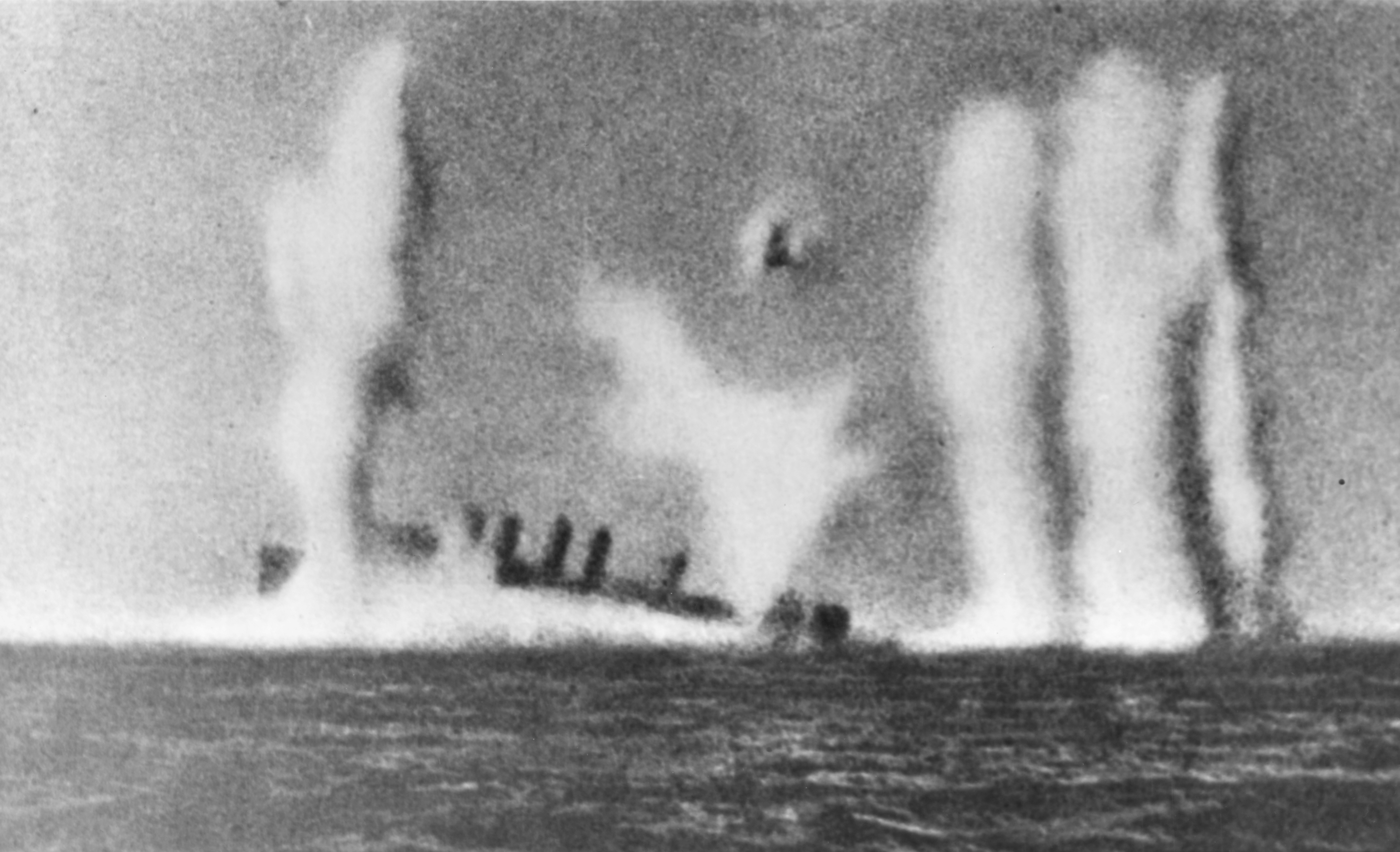
USS Edsall sinking, taken from Tone

However, many were not as lucky, Japanese forces raced to hunt down and destroy any Allied vessels attempting to escape. The first instances occurred concurrently with the battles of the Java Sea, first the destroyers Fubuki, Hatsuyuki, and Harukaze sank the Dutch patrol ships Sirius and Reiger, while the Wakaba and Hatsushimo probably sank the Dutch cargo ship Siaoe. The main slaughter began afterwards, starting immediately after the battle of Sunda Strait when Fubuki and Hatsuyuki located the British minesweepers Rahman and Sin Aik Lee, sinking both vessels without a fight. Simultaneously, land-based aircraft sank the seaplane tender USS Langley, while dive bombers from the aircraft carrier Sōryū sank the fleet oiler USS Pecos and helped to sink the destroyer USS Edsall alongside gunfire from the battleships Hiei and Kirishima and the heavy cruisers Tone and Chikuma. Later, the destroyers Kagerō, Shiranui, Kasumi, Isokaze, Ariake, and Yūgure dogpiled and sank the Dutch freighter Modjokerto, the destroyer Hayashio captured the Dutch cargo ship Speelman, and finally on 4 March the heavy cruiser Chikuma and the destroyer Urakaze sank the Dutch freighter Enggano.

Perhaps most notable was a mass raid conducted from 1–4 March by the heavy cruisers Takao, Atago, and Maya and the destroyers Nowaki and Arashi, which claimed 16 ships sunk or captured, known by Japanese sources as the battle of Tjilatjap. It started on 1 March when Nowaki and Arashi sank the Dutch cargo ships Tomohon and Pageri, then later sank the British minesweeper Scott Harley and the Dutch freighter Toradjo and captured the Dutch freighter Bintoehan. The next day, Nowaki and Arashi sank the Norwegian cargo ship Prominent, then Takao and Atago sank the destroyer USS Pillsbury with all hands, while Maya, Nowaki, and Arashi sank the destroyer HMS Stronghold, before on 3 March Nowaki and Arashi sank the gunboat USS Asheville. Finally on 4 March, all five ships raided a convoy destined for Australia, together sinking the sloop HMAS Yarra, the oil tanker Fancol, the depot ship Anking, and the minesweepers M-3 and M-51, and capturing the freighters Duymaer van Twist and Tjisaroea.

=== Scuttling of the Dutch Navy ===
As Japanese forces began to reach the port of Surabaya, many Dutch ships still at anchor were not in a condition to escape the port. In order to prevent capture, 50 Dutch ships were scuttled in Surabaya. Among these was the destroyer Witte de With, still damaged by air attacks. While many of these ships were salvageable enough for the Japanese to raise and repair them, the operation was very successful as most of their warships were either completely destroyed or unable to serve combat roles. However, it completely decimated the Dutch navy for the rest of the war, effectively ending its role in the war outside of a few surviving submarines which continued to operate with the US Navy and Royal Navy, and a few surviving destroyers, flotilla leaders and gunboats serving with the Royal Navy.

=== Consequences ===
The Battle of the Java Sea ended significant Allied naval operations in Southeast Asia in 1942, and Japanese land forces invaded Java on 28 February. The Dutch surface fleet was practically eradicated from Asian waters and the Netherlands would never reclaim full control of its colony. The Japanese now controlled one of the most important food-producing regions (Java) and by conquering the Dutch East Indies, Japan also controlled the fourth-largest oil producing area in the world in 1940.

The U.S. and Royal Air Force retreated to Australia. Dutch troops, aided by British remnants, fought fiercely for a week. In the campaign the Japanese executed many Allied POWs and sympathizing Indonesians. Eventually, the Japanese won this decisive battle of attrition and ABDA forces surrendered on 9 March.

== Wrecks ==
As of 2002, the location of the wreck of only one of the eight ships sunk during the two so-called Java Sea Battles, HMS Jupiter, was known and plotted on an Admiralty chart. However, given her location in very shallow water so close to shore she had already been heavily salvaged.

In December 2002, the wrecks of HNLMS Java and HNLMS De Ruyter were discovered by a specialist wreck diving group aboard the dive vessel MV Empress. Empress then went on to discover the wrecks of HMS Electra in August 2003; HNLMS Kortenaer in August 2004; and HMS Exeter and HMS Encounter in February 2007. When discovered these wrecks were all in a very well-preserved state, save for battle damage. In late 2008, Empress discovered remnants of the last wreck, USS Pope, which had already been largely removed by illegal salvage diving operations.

Although the MV Empress team kept the locations of their discoveries secret, by 2017 all eight ships had been reduced to remnants or even entirely removed by illegal commercial salvage operations.

== See also ==
- Always Another Dawn (1948) - film that depicts the battle
