= HMS Jupiter (F85) =

Destroyer of the Royal Navy

Coordinates: 6°45′S 112°6′E

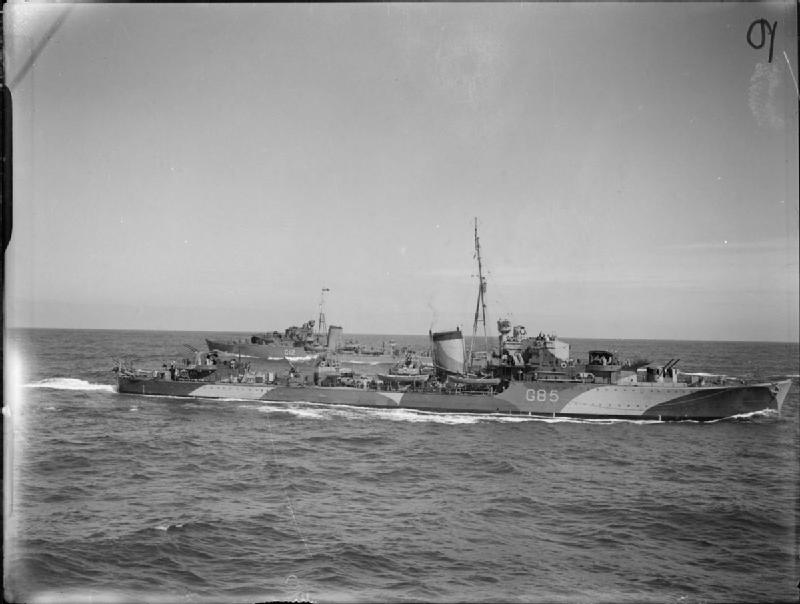
- Jupiter in August 1940, with the destroyer Kashmir in the background

History

United Kingdom
- Name: Jupiter
- Builder: Yarrow & Company
- Laid down: 28 September 1937
- Launched: 27 October 1938
- Commissioned: 25 June 1939
- Identification: Pennant number:F85
- Fate: Struck a mine and sank, 27 February 1942

General characteristics (as built)
- Class & type: J-class destroyer
- Displacement: 1,690 long tons (1,720 t) (standard); 2,330 long tons (2,370 t) (deep load)
- Length: 356 ft 6 in (108.66 m) o/a
- Beam: 35 ft 9 in (10.90 m)
- Draught: 12 ft 6 in (3.81 m) (deep)
- Installed power: 44,000 shp (33,000 kW); 2 × Admiralty 3-drum boilers
- Propulsion: 2 × shafts; 2 × geared steam turbines
- Speed: 36 knots (67 km/h; 41 mph)
- Range: 5,500 nmi (10,200 km; 6,300 mi) at 15 knots (28 km/h; 17 mph)
- Complement: 183 (218 for flotilla leaders)
- Sensors & processing systems: ASDIC
- Armament: 3 × twin 4.7 in (120 mm) guns; 1 × quadruple 2 pdr (40 mm (1.6 in) AA guns; 2 × quadruple 0.5 in (12.7 mm) anti-aircraft machineguns; 2 × quintuple 21 in (533 mm) torpedo tubes; 1 × rack, 2 × throwers for depth charges

HMS Jupiter was a J-class destroyer of the Royal Navy.

== Design ==
As completed, Jupiter had a main gun armament of six 4.7-inch (119 mm) QF Mark XII guns in three twin mountings, two forward and one aft. These guns could only elevate to an angle of 40 degrees, and so were of limited use in the anti-aircraft role, while the aft mount was arranged so that it could fire forwards over the ship's superstructure to maximise the forward firing firepower, but was therefore incapable of firing directly aft. A short range anti-aircraft armament of a four-barrelled 2 pounder "pom-pom" anti-aircraft mount and eight .50 in machine guns in two quadruple mounts was fitted, while torpedo armament consisted of ten 21-inch (533 mm) torpedo tubes in two quintuple mounts.

== Construction and career ==
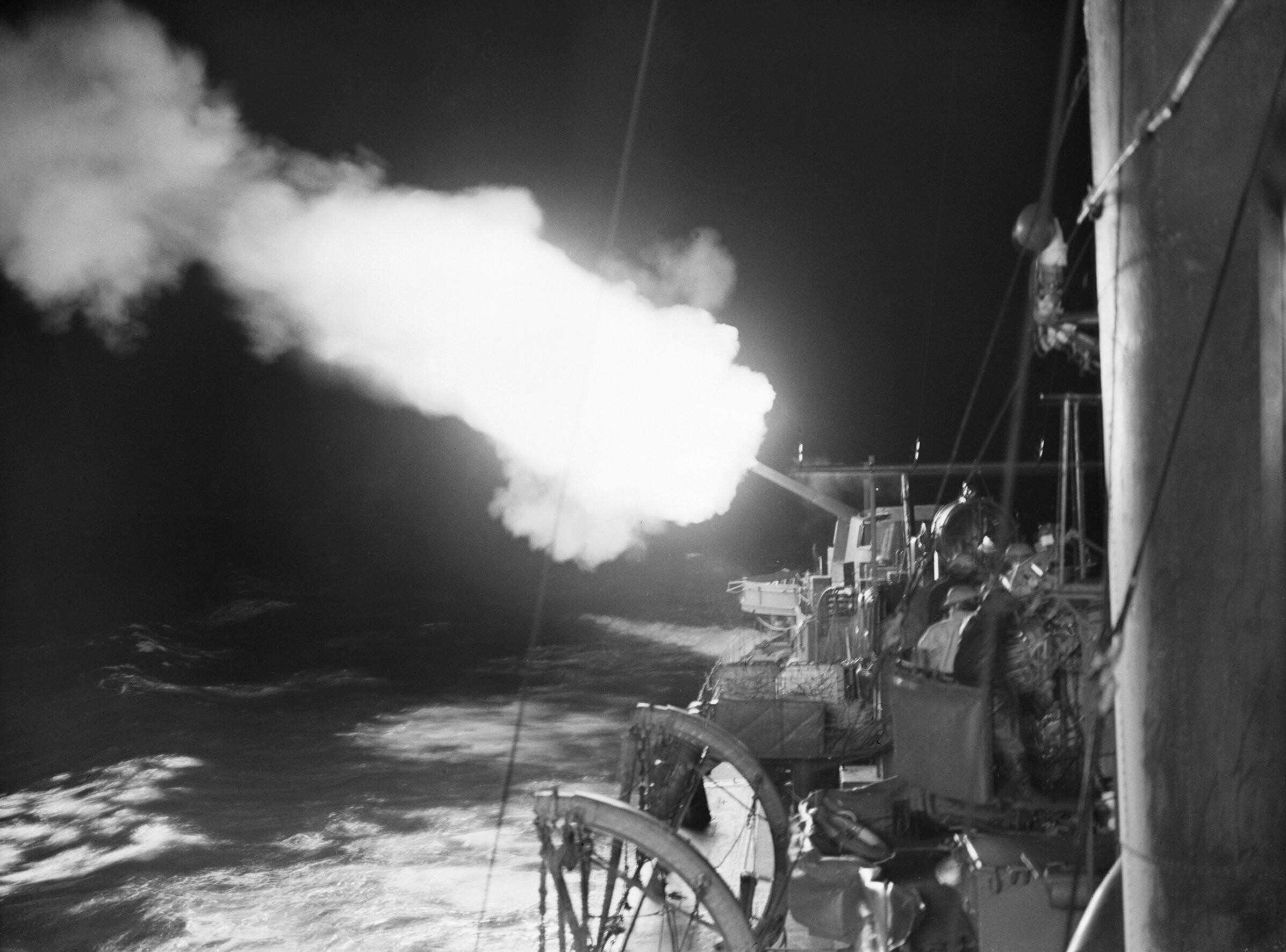
4.7-inch gun onboard Jupiter firing on enemy shipping in the port of Cherbourg, 10/11 October 1940

Jupiter was ordered, along with the rest of the J class, on 25 March 1937, and was laid down by Yarrow, Limited, at their Scotstoun, Glasgow shipyard on Clydebank in Scotland on 28 September 1937 and launched on 27 October 1938. She was commissioned on 22 June 1939, and was completed on 25 June 1939, at a cost of £389,511.

After commissioning, Jupiter underwent sea trials and worked up at Portland, with these activities being delayed by problems with the ship's turbines that required repair at Devonport Dockyard. Jupiter completed trials on 1 September 1939, and joined the 7th Destroyer Flotilla of the Home Fleet, based on the Humber, in time for the British declaration of war on 3 September 1939. (Note: This cost included the costs of the hull and machinery, but excluded the cost of government provided equipment such as the ship's armament and radios.)

On 29 November 1941, Jupiter and the destroyer Encounter detached from the Mediterranean Fleet, joined up with Force G at Colombo, and the five ships sailed later that day. They rendezvoused with the battlecruiser Repulse at sea, and set course for Singapore, where they arrived on 2 December. They spent a few days there with shore leave and refit, while waiting for orders. On 1 December, it was announced that Sir Tom Phillips had been promoted to full Admiral, and appointed Commander-in-Chief of the Eastern Fleet. A few days later, Repulse started on a trip to Australia with the destroyers Vampire and Tenedos, but the force was recalled. It was not until nine days later that Tenedos and Repulse would join Phillips' Force Z in attacking the Japanese invasion force, and he himself would perish when both Repulse and the battleship Prince of Wales were bombed and sunk by Japanese land based bombers. During her campaign in the Pacific, Jupiter was commanded by Lieutenant Commander Norman V. J. T. Thew.

Jupiter sank the I-60 on 17 January 1942. On 27 February 1942 she struck a mine laid earlier in the day by the Dutch minelayer HNLMS Gouden Leeuw as she steamed with the American-British-Dutch-Australian Command (ABDA) cruiser force during the Battle of the Java Sea. The destroyer sank off the north Java coast in the Java Sea at 21:16 hours. Initially, the explosion was thought to have been caused by a Japanese torpedo. Most of her crew, totalling 97, were captured by Japanese forces, while 83 were rescued from the shore by submarine USS S-38. There were 84 dead or missing.

The wreck has been plotted, and is described by the Admiralty as "very broken up, partly salvaged, and very close to the Java coast".
