= Japanese destroyer Hatsukaze =

Kagerō-class destroyer

- Hatsukaze (right) and Natsugumo docked in Formosa, 30 July 1940

History

Empire of Japan
- Name: Hatsukaze
- Builder: Kawasaki Shipyards
- Laid down: 3 December 1937
- Launched: 24 January 1939
- Completed: 15 February 1940
- Stricken: 2 November 1943
- Fate: Sunk in action, 2 November 1943

General characteristics
- Class & type: Kagerō-class destroyer
- Displacement: 2,033 long tons (2,066 t) standard
- Length: 118.5 m (388 ft 9 in)
- Beam: 10.8 m (35 ft 5 in)
- Draft: 3.8 m (12 ft 6 in)
- Propulsion: 3 × Kampon water tube boilers; 2 × Kanpon impulse turbines; 2 × shafts, 52,000 shp (39 MW)
- Speed: 35.5 knots (40.9 mph; 65.7 km/h)
- Range: 6,053 NM at 18 knots (21 mph; 33 km/h)
- Complement: 239
- Armament: (1939); 6 × 12.7 cm/50 Type 3 DP guns; 2 × Type 96 25 mm AA guns; 8 × 610 mm (24 in) torpedo tubes; 16 depth charges; 2 × paravanes; (1943); 8 × Type 96 25 mm AA guns; 36 depth charges

Service record
- Part of: Destroyer Division 16, Squadron 2 (1941-42); Destroyer Division 16, Squadron 10 (1942-43)
- Operations: Invasion of Philippines (1941); Invasion of Timor and eastern Java (1941); Battle of the Java Sea (1942); Christmas Island invasion (1942); Battle of the Eastern Solomons (1942); Battle of the Santa Cruz Islands (1942); Battle of Empress Augusta Bay (1943)
- Victories: USS Perch (1936); PT-43 (1941); PT-112 (1943)

Hatsukaze (初風, lit. “First Wind”) was the seventh vessel to be commissioned in the 19-vessel Kagerō-class destroyers built for the Imperial Japanese Navy in the late-1930s under the Circle Three Supplementary Naval Expansion Program (Maru San Keikaku). She survived four major fleet actions against the Allies, and helped to sink the submarine USS Perch and the US torpedo boats PT-43 and PT-112 throughout her career but, after being damaged through a collision with the Japanese heavy cruiser Myōkō, she was sunk by an American destroyer flotilla led by Captain Arleigh Burke aboard USS Charles Ausburne at the battle of the Empress August Bay, 2 November 1943.

== Background ==
The Kagerō class was an enlarged and improved version of the preceding Asashio class of destroyers. Their crew numbered 240 officers and enlisted men. The ships measured 118.5 meters (388 ft 9 in) overall, with a beam of 10.8 meters (35 ft 5 in) and a draft of 3.76 meters (12 ft 4 in). They displaced 2,065 metric tons (2,032 long tons) at standard load and 2,529 metric tons (2,489 long tons) at deep load. The ships had two Kampon geared steam turbines, each driving one propeller shaft, using steam provided by three Kampon water-tube boilers. The turbines were rated at a total of 52,000 shaft horsepower (39,000 kW) for a designed speed of 35 knots (65 km/h; 40 mph). However, the class proved capable of exceeding 35.5 knots on sea trials. The ships were designed with a range of 5,000 nautical miles (9,300 km; 5,800 mi) at a speed of 18 knots (33 km/h; 21 mph). However, the class more accurately proved to have a range of 6,053 nautical miles (11,210 km; 6,966 mi) on trials.

The main armament of the Kagerō class consisted of six Type 3 127-millimeter (5.0 in) guns in three twin-gun turrets, one superfiring pair aft and one turret forward of the superstructure. They were built with four Type 96 25-millimeter (1.0 in) anti-aircraft guns in two twin-gun mounts, but more of these guns were added over the course of the war. The ships were also armed with eight 610-millimeter (24.0 in) torpedo tubes for the oxygen-fueled Type 93 "Long Lance" torpedo in two quadruple traversing mounts; one reload was carried for each tube. Their anti-submarine weapons consisted of up to 32 depth charges.

== Operational history ==
=== Invasions of Southeast Asia ===
At the time of the attack on Pearl Harbor, Hatsukaze, was assigned as port of Destroyer Division 16 (Yukikaze, Tokitsukaze, Amatsukaze, Hatsukaze), and a member of Destroyer Squadron 2 of the IJN 2nd Fleet, and had deployed from Palau, as part of the escort for the aircraft carrier Ryūjō in the invasion of the southern Philippines and minelayer Yaeyama.

In early 1942, Hatsukaze participated in the invasion of the Netherlands East Indies, escorting the invasion forces for Menado, Kendari and Ambon in January, and the invasion forces for Makassar, Timor and eastern Java in February. On 27–28 February, Hatsukaze and Desron 2 participated in the Battle of the Java Sea, taking part in a torpedo attack on the Allied fleet. During the month of March, Desron 2 was engaged in anti-submarine operations in the Java Sea. On one such occasion in the early morning of 1 March, Hatsukaze was fulfilling this role when Amatsukaze located the submarine USS Perch and fired 32 rounds against the submarine, setting her on fire. Hatsukaze only fired a single salvo against the submarine which missed before the enemy ship crashed dived, but she managed to join Amatsukaze in furiously depth charging the surrounding area and mortally wounded Perch, destroying half of her engines, all of her electrical equipment and instruments, and permanently damaging her hull and watertight integrity, enabling the crippled submarine to be finished off by the destroyers Ushio and Sazanami. Later that midnight, Amatsukaze fatally wounded the Dutch submarine K-10 with depth charge attacks, although Hatsukaze played no role in the sinking.

At the end of the month, the squadron escorted the Christmas Island invasion force, then returned to Makassar. At the end of April, Hatsukaze sailed to Kure Naval Arsenal for maintenance, docking on May 3. On 21 May 1942, Hatsukaze and Desron 2 steamed from Kure to Saipan, where they rendezvoused with a troop convoy and sailed toward Midway Island. Due to the defeat of the Carrier Striking Force and loss of four fleet carriers in the Battle of Midway, the invasion was called off and the convoy withdrew without seeing combat. Desdiv 16 was ordered back to Kure.

=== Solomon Islands campaign ===
On 14 July, Hatsukaze and Desdiv 16 were reassigned to Desron 10, Third Fleet. On 16 August, Desron 10 departed Kure, escorting a fleet towards Truk. On 24 August, Desron 10 escorted Admiral Nagumo's Striking Force in the Battle of the Eastern Solomons. During September and October, the squadron escorted the fleet patrolling out of Truk north of the Solomon Islands. On 26 October, in the Battle of the Santa Cruz Islands, the squadron escorted the Striking Force, then escorted the damaged carriers Shōkaku and Zuihō into Truk on 28 October. On 4 November, Desron 10 escorted Zuikaku from Truk to Kure, then engaged in training in the Inland Sea, and then escorted Zuikaku from Truk to the Shortland Islands in January 1943.

On 10 January, while providing cover for a supply-drum transport run to Guadalcanal, Hatsukaze was attacked by the American torpedo boats PT-43 and PT-112. With the Tokitsukaze, she opened fire, and they together sank both vessels, but not before Hatsukaze was struck by a torpedo from PT-112 to her bow on the port side, killing 8 sailors and wounding 12 others. Commander Kameshiro considered scuttling Hatsukaze, but this was dismissed as a speed of 16 knots was recovered and Hatsukaze limped to Truk for emergency repairs She then sailed to Kure in April for more extensive repairs. In September, Hatsukaze and Desron 10 escorted the battleship Yamato from Kure to Truk. In late September and again in late October, Desron 10 escorted the main fleet from Truk to Eniwetok and back again, in response to American carrier airstrikes in the Central Pacific region. Between these two missions, Hatsukaze sortied briefly from Truk in early October 1943 to evacuate the sinking fleet oiler Kazahaya, which had been torpedoed by the submarine USS Tinosa.

=== Final battle ===
On 2 November 1943, while attacking an Allied cruiser-destroyer task force off Bougainville in the Battle of Empress Augusta Bay, Hatsukaze collided with the cruiser Myōkō. The collision sheared off her bow, and as she limped at 10 knots, she exchanged fire with the destroyer USS Spence, being set on fire by 5-inch (127 mm) shells before an 8-inch (203 mm) shell hit from Myōkō forced Spence to disengage. With Hatsukaze badly damaged but not sunk, Spence called upon the skilled Captain Arleigh Burke's destroyer division 45, consisting of his flagship, USS Charles Ausburne, leading USS Claxton, Dyson, and Stanly to deliver the final blows. Burke's ships promptly opened fire, and a barrage of 5-inch (127 mm) gunfire blasted Hatsukaze, stopping her dead in the water as any remaining guns were silenced and flooding began to quickly overwhelm damage control. The abandoned ship order was issued as Hatsukaze slipped beneath the waves and sank. Of those on board, 164 were killed, including its commanding officer, Lieutenant Commander Buichi Ashida.Hatsukaze was removed from the navy list on 5 January 1944.

== Books ==
- Brown, David (1990). Warship Losses of World War Two. Naval Institute Press. ISBN 1-55750-914-X.
- D'Albas, Andrieu (1965). Death of a Navy: Japanese Naval Action in World War II. Devin-Adair Pub. ISBN 0-8159-5302-X.
- Evans, David (1979). Kaigun: Strategy, Tactics, and Technology in the Imperial Japanese Navy, 1887-1941. US Naval Institute Press. ISBN 0-87021-192-7.
- Roger Chesneau, ed. (1980). Conway's All the World's Fighting Ships 1922-1946. Grenwitch: Conway Maritime Press. ISBN 0-85177-146-7.
- Howarth, Stephen (1983). The Fighting Ships of the Rising Sun: The Drama of the Imperial Japanese Navy, 1895–1945. Atheneum. ISBN 0-689-11402-8.
- Jentsura, Hansgeorg (1976). Warships of the Imperial Japanese Navy, 1869–1945. US Naval Institute Press. ISBN 0-87021-893-X.
- Watts, A.J. (1966). Japanese warships of World War II. Ian Allan. ISBN 0711002150.
- Whitley, M. J. (1988). Destroyers of World War 2. Cassell Publishing. ISBN 1-85409-521-8.
