= Nojima Maru =

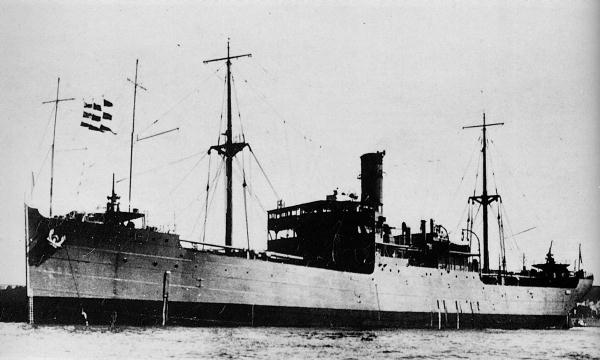
- The collier Nojima, around 1935

History

Japan
- Name: Nojima Maru
- Builder: Mitsubishi Heavy Industries, Kobe
- Laid down: 16 July 1918
- Launched: 3 February 1919
- Completed: 31 March 1919
- Fate: Sunk by aircraft on 3 March 1943 in the Bismarck Sea

General characteristics
- Class & type: Muroto-class coal cargo ship
- Tonnage: 8,215 GRT
- Length: 105.2 m (345 ft 2 in)
- Beam: 15.2 m (49 ft 10 in)
- Draught: 7.1 m (23 ft 4 in)
- Installed power: 1,900 kW (2,500 shp)
- Speed: 14 knots (26 km/h; 16 mph)
- Armament: 2 × 76.2 mm L/40 AA guns

Nojima Maru, also known as Noshima Maru or Nozima Maru, was an 8,215-ton coal ship, also used as troop transport ship by the Imperial Japanese Army (IJA) during World War II.

Built by Mitsubishi Heavy Industries in Kobe and launched in 1919, the Nojima Maru was part of the China Area Fleet in 1937, and operated off Shanghai in support of the fleet. On 27 December 1941, 30 nautical miles (56 km; 35 mi) southwest of Hong Kong, the Nojima Maru was torpedoed by USS Perch. The bow was blown off, but Nojima was saved by stranding herself in Hunghai Bay. It took one year to repair the ship.

On 1 March 1943, she left Rabaul, New Britain, as part of Operation 81, carrying 1,225 men of the IJA's 51st Division, the Navy's 3rd Air Defense Unit and 600 troops of the Special Naval Landing Forces (SNLF) for Lae, New Guinea. The convoy was attacked by aircraft of the United States Army Air Forces and Royal Australian Air Force from 2 March 1943, known as the Battle of the Bismarck Sea. On 3 March Nojima Maru was damaged both by aircraft and a collision with Japanese destroyer Arashio. Later, Nojima Maru sank 50 nautical miles (93 km; 58 mi) southeast of Finschafen, New Guinea at 07°15′S 148°30′E. Some 400 crew and troops were killed.
