= Japanese destroyer Ushio (1930) =

Fubuki-class destroyer

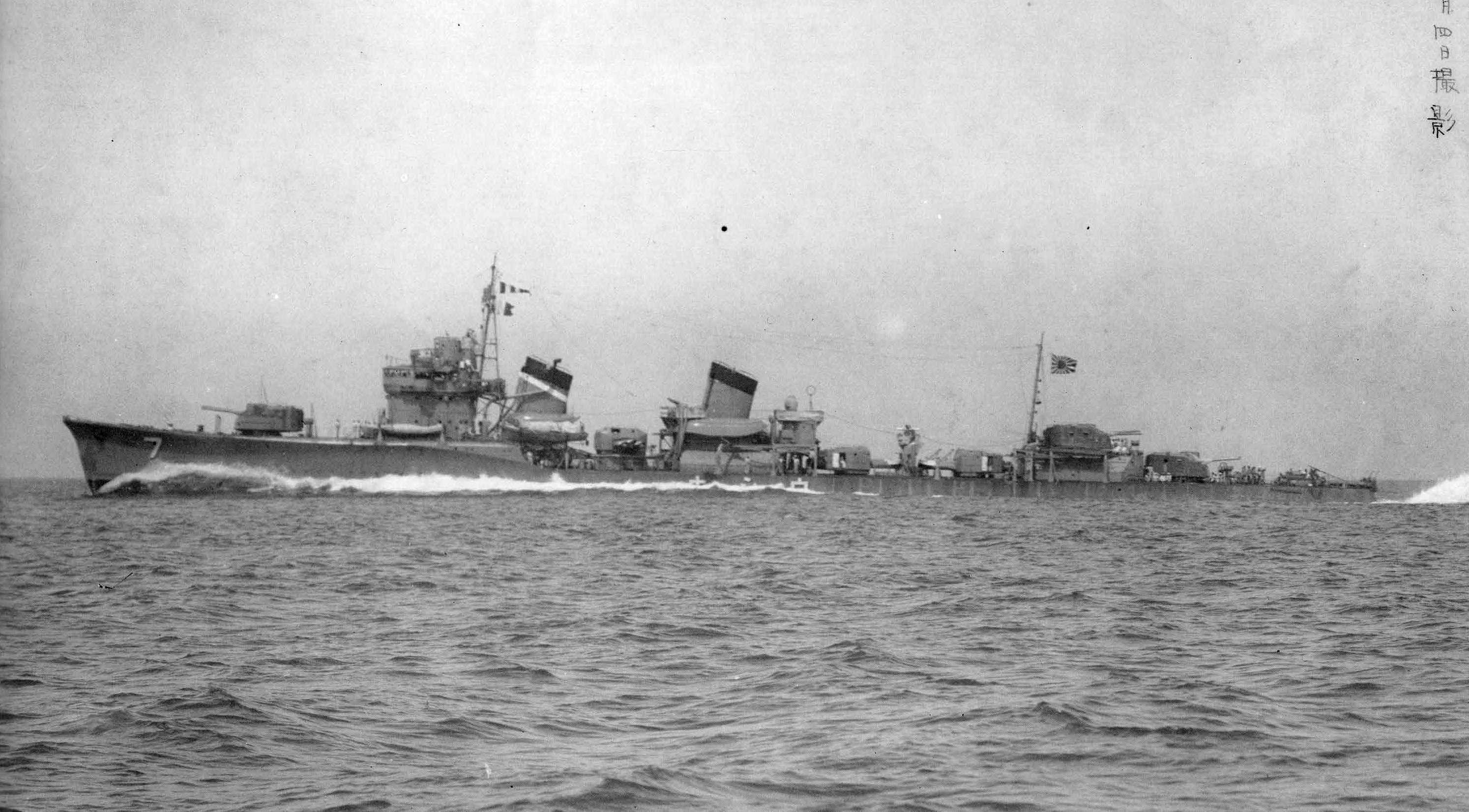
- Ushio underway on 4 August 1936.

History

Empire of Japan
- Name: Ushio
- Ordered: 1923 Fiscal Year
- Builder: Uraga Dock Company
- Yard number: Destroyer No. 54
- Laid down: 24 December 1929
- Launched: 17 November 1930
- Commissioned: 14 November 1931
- Stricken: 15 September 1945
- Fate: Scrapped on 4 August 1948
- Notes: surrendered 15 August 1945

General characteristics
- Class & type: Fubuki-class destroyer
- Displacement: 1,750 long tons (1,780 t) standard; 2,050 long tons (2,080 t) re-built
- Length: 111.96 m (367.3 ft) pp; 115.3 m (378 ft) waterline; 118.41 m (388.5 ft) overall
- Beam: 10.4 m (34 ft 1 in)
- Draft: 3.2 m (10 ft 6 in)
- Propulsion: 4 × Kampon type boilers; 2 × Kampon Type Ro geared turbines; 2 × shafts at 50,000 ihp (37,000 kW)
- Speed: 38 knots (44 mph; 70 km/h)
- Range: 5,000 nmi (9,300 km) at 14 knots (26 km/h)
- Complement: 219
- Armament: 6 × Type 3 127 mm 50 caliber naval guns (3×2); up to 22 × Type 96 25 mm AT/AA Guns; up to 10 × 13 mm AA guns; 9 × 610 mm (24 in) torpedo tubes; 36 × depth charges

Service record
- Operations: Second Sino-Japanese War; Battle of the Java Sea; Battle of the Coral Sea; Battle of Midway; Battle of the Eastern Solomons; Solomon Islands campaign; Battle of Leyte Gulf
- Victories: USS Perch (SS-176) (1936)

Ushio (潮, "Tide") was the twentieth of twenty-four Fubuki-class destroyers that were built for the Imperial Japanese Navy following World War I. Ushio was the only destroyer of the 20 ship strong Fubuki-class destroyers to survive World War II and was the only ship out of the 22 combat ships involved in the Pearl Harbor assault force to survive post-war. Ushio's only significant naval victory came by scoring primary credit for finishing off the badly damaged submarine USS Perch on 2-3 March 1942. She was sold for scrap in 1948.

== History ==
Construction of the advanced Fubuki-class destroyers was authorized as part of the Imperial Japanese Navy's expansion program from fiscal 1923, intended to give Japan a qualitative edge with the world's most modern ships. The Fubuki class had performance that was a quantum leap over previous destroyer designs, so much so that they were designated Special Type destroyers (特型, Tokugata). The large size, powerful engines, high speed, large radius of action and unprecedented armament gave these destroyers the firepower similar to many light cruisers in other navies. Ushio, built at the Uraga Dock Company was the tenth in an improved series, which incorporated a modified gun turret which could elevate her main battery of Type 3 127 mm 50 caliber naval guns to 75° as opposed to the original 40°, thus permitting the guns to be used as dual purpose guns against aircraft. Ushio was laid down on 24 December 1929, launched on 17 November 1930 and commissioned on 15 November 1931. Originally assigned hull designation “Destroyer No. 54”, she was designated Ushio before her launch.

== Operational history ==
In 1932, after the First Shanghai Incident, Ushio was assigned to patrols of the Yangtze River. In 1935, after the Fourth Fleet Incident, in which a large number of ships were damaged by a typhoon, she, along with her sister ships, were modified with stronger hulls and increased displacement. From 1937, Ushio covered landing of Japanese forces in Shanghai and Hangzhou during the Second Sino-Japanese War. From 1940, she was assigned to patrol and cover landings of Japanese forces in south China, and subsequently participated in the Invasion of French Indochina.

=== World War II history ===
At the time of the attack on Pearl Harbor, Ushio was Captain Konishi Kaname's flagship of destroyer division 7 (Ushio, Sazanami, Akebono) of the IJN 1st Air Fleet, and had deployed from Tateyama Naval Air Station as part of the force which bombarded Midway Atoll in the opening stages of the war.

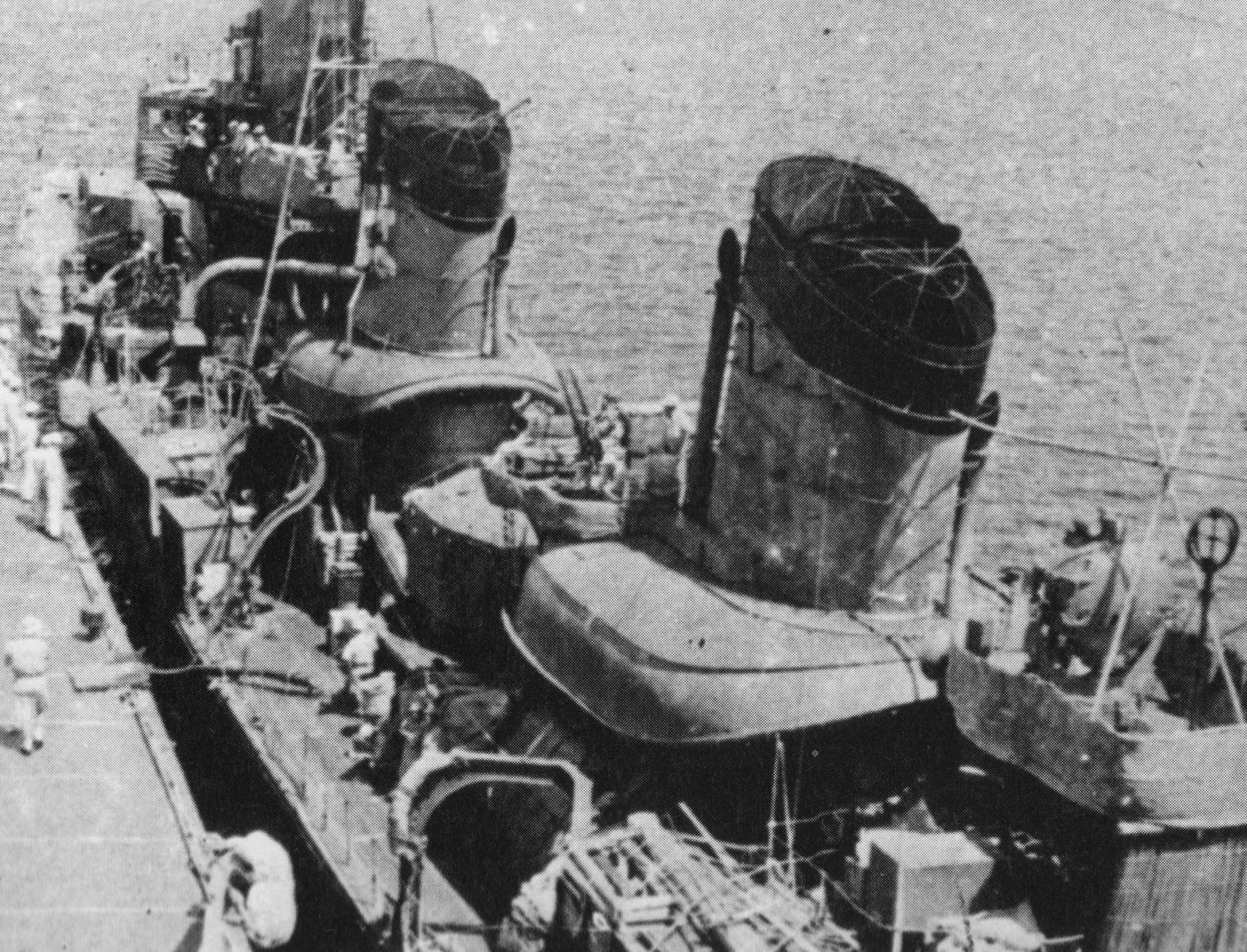
Ushio being refueled from the heavy cruiser Haguro, 13 February 1942

Ushio was part of the escort for the aircraft carriers Hiryū and Sōryū during air strikes against Ambon. She was subsequently part of the escort for the cruisers Nachi and Haguro during the Japanese invasion of the eastern Netherlands East Indies. On 27 February, at the Battle of the Java Sea, Ushio fired torpedoes at an allied cruiser-destroyer group, but none hit as Haguro and Nachi primarily carried the battle into a Japanese victory. However, in the battle's aftermath on 2 March, Ushio and Sazanami located the already badly damaged submarine USS Perch, which the previous day had been mortally wounded by gunfire and depth charges from the destroyers Amatsukaze and Hatsukaze. Ushio and Sazanami dropped another pattern of depth charges that even further devastated Perch, leaving the submarine unable to dive and barely capable of 5 knots. The idea to scuttle Perch was being debated as she desperately limped to home base, only for Ushio to rediscover the trashed Perch the next day and open fire. Right as the first 5-inch (127 mm) shell hit the conning tower, the crew abandoned ship and left the submarine to sink. Miraculously, all 59 sailors survived and were rescued by Ushio. She returned to Yokosuka Naval Arsenal for repairs at the end of March.

Ushio subsequently escorted aircraft carrier Shōkaku to Truk, at the Battle of the Coral Sea. On 4–5 June, Ushio participated in the Battle of Midway as was part of the diversionary Aleutian Invasion force and was subsequently based at Ōminato Guard District for patrols of northern waters until mid-July.

On 14 July, Ushio was reassigned to the Combined Fleet, and escorted the battleship Yamato and aircraft carrier Taiyō at the Battle of the Eastern Solomons on 24 August, returning with Yamato to Truk after the battle.

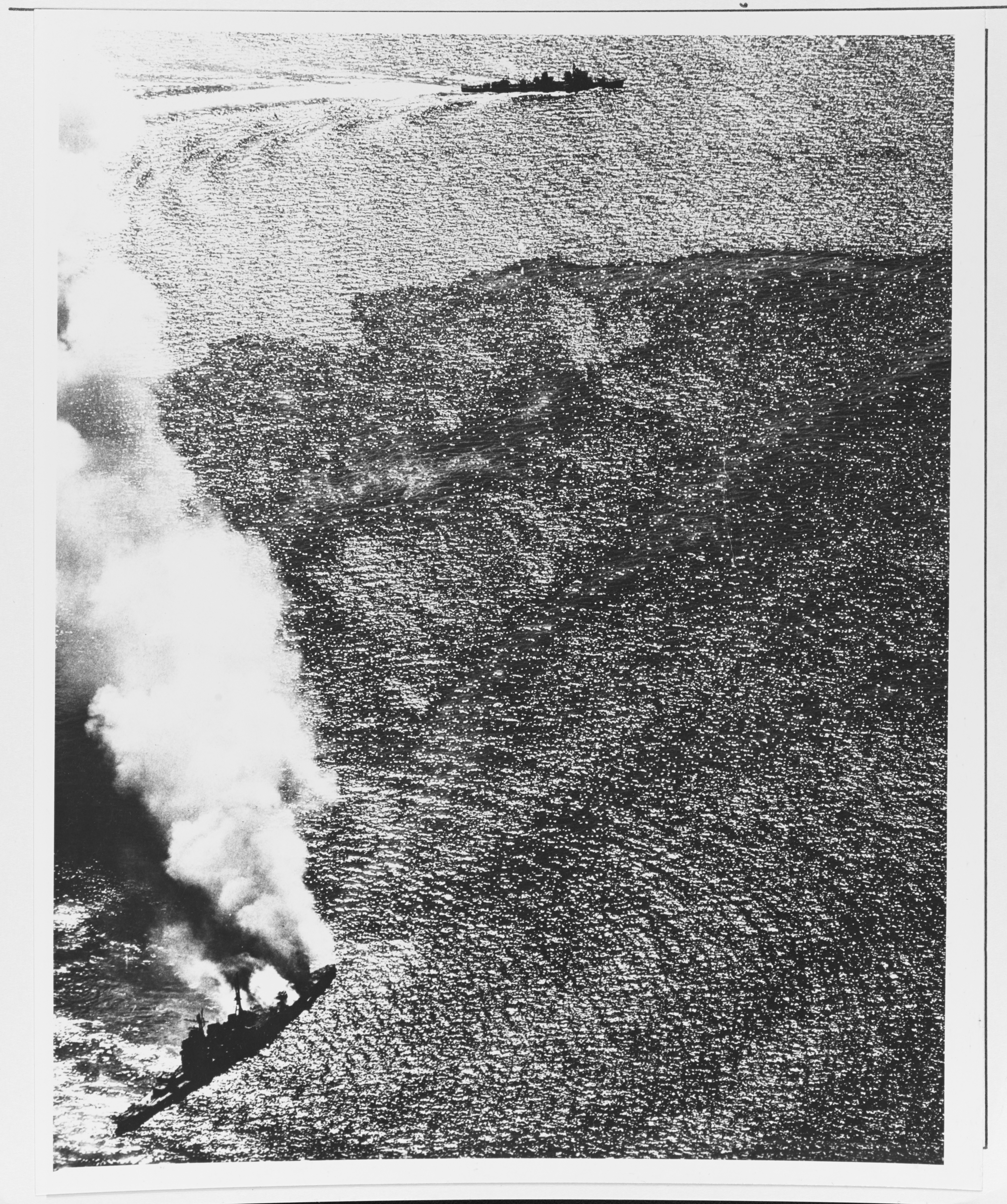
Ushio maneuvering alongside the sinking heavy cruiser Nachi, 5 November 1944

She was then assigned to numerous "Tokyo Express" transport missions to various locations in the Solomon Islands in September. Through the end of 1943, Ushio served as an escort for Unyō, Ryūhō, Zuihō, and Taiyō in various missions between the Japanese home islands, Truk, the Netherlands East Indies and the Philippines.

In early 1944, Ushio was assigned to escort duty, mostly of troop convoys from Truk. From April through August, she was based at Ōminato Guard District for patrols of northern waters, and escort of ships between Hokkaidō and Yokosuka or Kure.

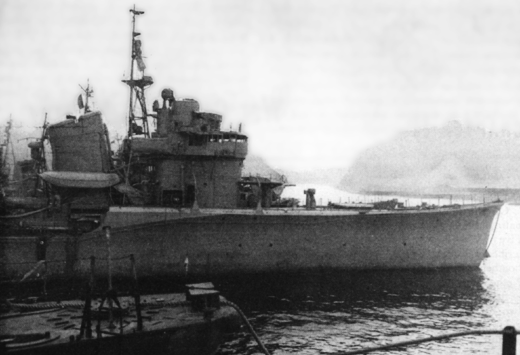
Ushio anchored in Yokosuka after the end of WW2 in 1946

During the Battle of Leyte Gulf, Ushio was assigned to Admiral Kiyohide Shima's Diversionary Force at the Battle of Surigao Strait, remaining based in Manila after the battle to escort convoys in the Philippines, during which on 5 November she survived an air raid, rescued survivors from the sunken heavy cruiser Nachi, then towed the crippled Akebono back to Manila. She was damaged on 13 November during an American air raid on Manila that also sank the still crippled Akebono and three other anchored Japanese destroyers (Hatsuharu, Okinami, Akishimo), during which her starboard engine was disabled, and 23 crewmen killed. After temporally repairs were made in Singapore, the still damaged Ushio was reassigned to the IJN 2nd Fleet. In December, she assisted the damaged heavy cruiser Myōkō and escort her to Japan to receive permanent repairs for both ships. However, while underway on the 13th, they were located by the submarine USS Bergall, which due to the shallow depth of the water surfaced to torpedo the Japanese ships above the waterline "like a PT-Boat". Right as the Japanese located her, one of Bergall's six torpedoes struck Myōkō and blew off her stern. Ushio returned fire and unloaded four salvos, the first scored a near miss, while the second landed a hit to the loading hatch and tore a large hole in the submarine's pressure hull as she just barely avoided destruction and dashed off. Ushio assisted the now crippled Myōkō in reaching Singapore where the cruiser spent the rest of the war.

Returning to Yokosuka Naval Arsenal for repairs, Ushio remained in Japanese waters until the surrender of Japan. On 18 July 1945 she provided antiaircraft fire to defend the battleship Nagato during the attack on Yokosuka. On 15 September 1945, Ushio was removed from the navy list. She was broken up for scrap in 1948.
