= Muroto-class collier =

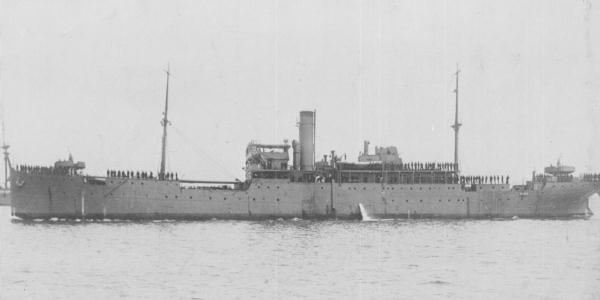
- Muroto in 1932

Class overview
- Name: Muroto-class collier
- Builders: Mitsubishi Heavy Industries
- Operators: Imperial Japanese Navy
- Built: 1918 – 1919
- In commission: 1918 – 1944
- Planned: 2
- Completed: 2
- Lost: 2

General characteristics
- Type: Collier
- Displacement: 8,215 long tons (8,347 t) standard; 8,750 long tons (8,890 t) standing
- Length: 105.16 m (345 ft 0 in) Lpp
- Beam: 15.24 m (50 ft 0 in)
- Draught: 7.06 m (23 ft 2 in)
- Propulsion: 1 × three expansion stages reciprocating engine; 2 × scotch boilers; single shaft, 2,500 shp; 1930; 3 × Miyahara model water tube boilers
- Speed: 12.5 knots (14.4 mph; 23.2 km/h); 1930; 14.0 knots (16.1 mph; 25.9 km/h)
- Capacity: 6,000 tons coal
- Complement: 124
- Armament: 1918; 2 × 120 mm (4.7 in) L/45 naval guns; 1932; 2 × 76.2 mm (3.00 in) L/40 AA guns

The Muroto-class colliers (室戸型給炭艦,, Muroto-gata Kyūtankan) were a class of collier of the Imperial Japanese Navy (IJN), serving from roughly the end of World War I into World War II. Two vessels were built in 1918-19 under the Eight-four fleet plan.

== Background ==
- In 1917, World War I was stagnant. The lengthy war led to an increase in shipping and a shortage of merchant ships.
- The IJN utilized steamship companies to perform coal transportation duties. However, this expedient was very costly. The IJN decided to build new colliers under the Eight-four fleet plan.
- Their design was ordinary, because the IJN did not impose any special requirements on them.

== Service ==
- In the 1920s, they engaged in coal transportation duties.
- In February 1932, the Muroto was remodeled, becoming an auxiliary hospital ship. She was refitted as a supply ship in 1941.
- In World War II, the value of coal as fuel fell. The ships engaged in transporting goods and troops.

== Ships in class ==
Ship	Builder	Laid down	Launched	Completed	Fate
Muroto (室戸)	Mitsubishi, Kōbe Shipyard	4 July 1918	23 October 1918	7 December 1918	Sunk by USS Sea Dog north of Amami Ōshima 29°10′N 129°44′E on 22 October 1944.
Noshima (野島)	Mitsubishi, Kōbe Shipyard	16 July 1918	3 February 1919	31 March 1919	Sunk during the Battle of the Bismarck Sea on 3 March 1943.

== Bibliography ==
- Monthly Ships of the World, Special issue Vol. 47, "Auxiliary Vessels of the Imperial Japanese Navy", "Kaijinsha"., (Japan), March 1997
- The Maru Special, Japanese Naval Vessels No. 34, "Japanese Auxiliary vessels", "Ushio Shobō". (Japan), December 1979
- Series 100 year histories from Meiji Era, Vol. 180, Histories of Naval organizations #8, Author: Ministry of the Navy, original plot in January 1940, reprinted in October 1971
- IJN Nojima: Tabular Record of Movement, <http://www.combinedfleet.com/NojimaS_t.htm>
- IJN Muroto: Tabular Record of Movement, <http://www.combinedfleet.com/Muroto_t.htm>

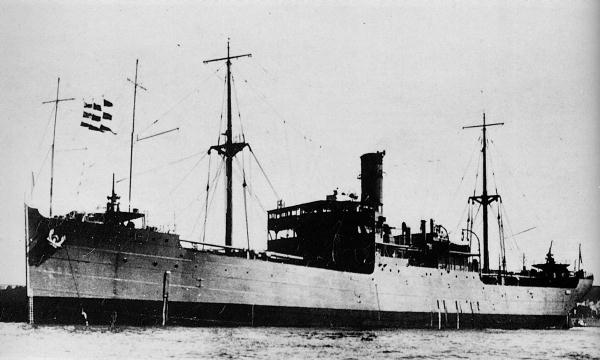
Noshima in 1935
