= USS Perch (SS-176) =

Submarine of the United States

Coordinates: 6°30′S 113°50′E

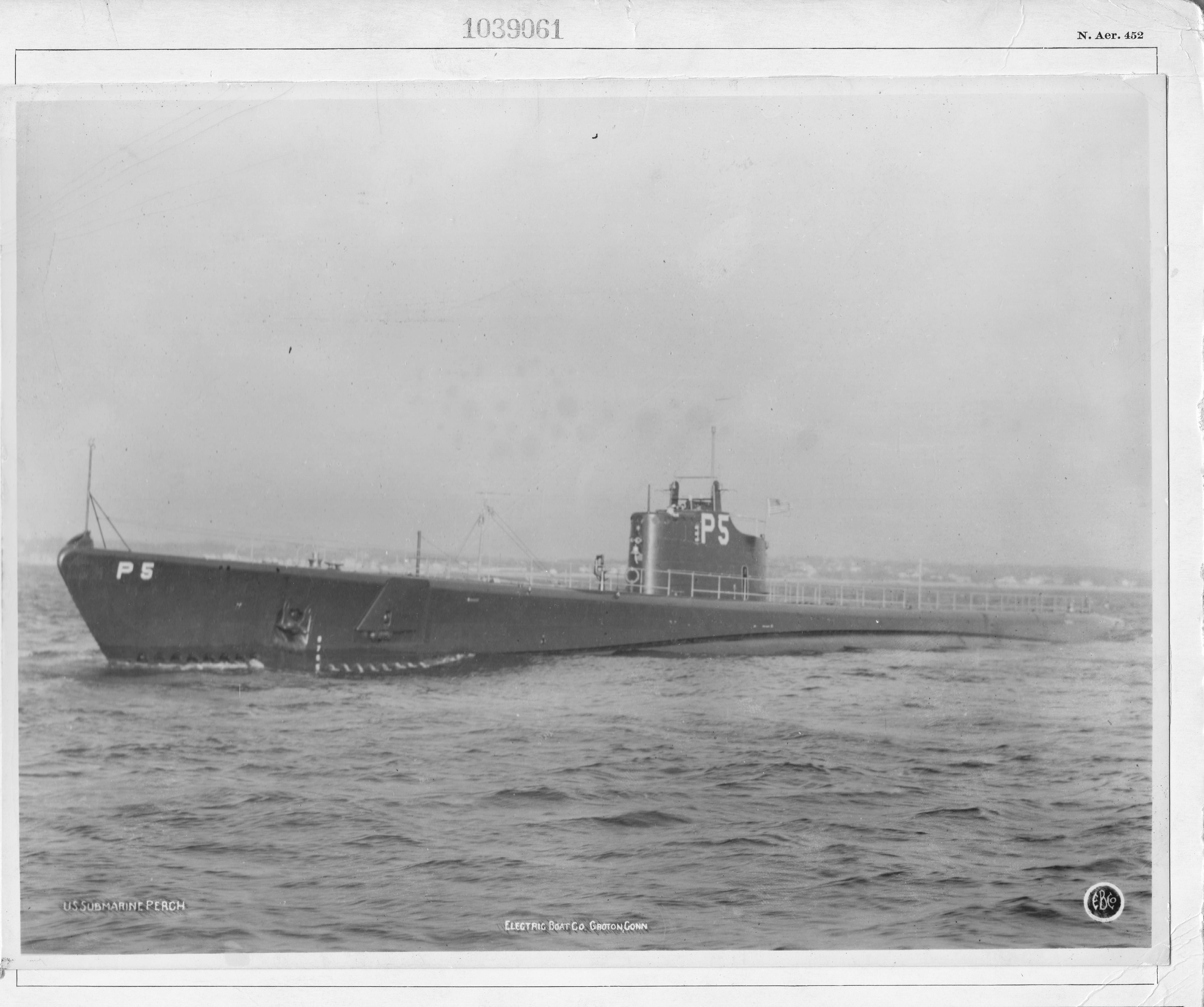
- Perch off Groton Connecticut in the fall of 1936

History

United States
- Builder: General Dynamics Electric Boat, Groton, Connecticut
- Laid down: 25 February 1935
- Launched: 9 May 1936
- Sponsored by: Mrs. Thomas Withers
- Commissioned: 19 November 1936
- Stricken: 24 June 1942
- Fate: Scuttled in the Java Sea on 3 March 1942 after being damaged by Japanese destroyers; wreck illegally scrapped

General characteristics
- Class & type: Porpoise-class diesel-electric submarine
- Displacement: 1,350 long tons (1,372 t) standard, surfaced, 1,997 long tons (2,029 t) submerged
- Length: 298 ft (91 m) (waterline), 300 ft 6 in (91.59 m) (overall)
- Beam: 26 ft (7.9 m)
- Draft: 15 ft (4.6 m)
- Propulsion: 4 × Winton Model 16-201A 16-cylinder two-cycle diesel engines, 1,300 hp (0.97 MW) each, driving electrical generators through reduction gears, 2 × 120-cell Gould AMTX33HB batteries, 8 × General Electric electric motors, 538 hp (401 kW) each, 2 × General Motors six-cylinder four-cycle 6-241 auxiliary diesels
- Speed: 19.25 kn (35.65 km/h) surfaced, 8.75 kn (16.21 km/h) submerged
- Range: 11,000 nmi (20,000 km) @ 10 kn (19 km/h), (bunkerage 92,801 US gal (351,290 L))
- Endurance: 10 hours @ 5 kn (9.3 km/h), 36 hours @ minimum speed submerged
- Test depth: 250 ft (76 m)
- Complement: As Built: 5 officers, 45 enlisted; 1945: 8 officers, 65 enlisted
- Armament: 6 × 21 inch (533 mm) torpedo tubes (four forward, two aft; 16 torpedoes), 1 × 4 in (100 mm)/50 caliber deck gun, 4 × 0.3 cal (7.62 mm) machineguns (2x2)

USS Perch (SS-176), a Porpoise-class submarine, was the first ship of the United States Navy to be named for the perch. Perch spent the first months of World War II protecting the Philippines and Dutch East Indies from Japanese invasion, successfully sinking the transport ship Nojima Maru and seeing several more instances of action. After the fall of the Dutch East Indies, though, Perch attempted to intercept the Java Sea invasion convoy, only to be crippled by the destroyers Amatsukaze and Hatsukaze, then was finished off by the destroyers Ushio and Sazanami. All 59 of her crew survived the sinking, 54 of whom survived to the end of the war.

== Construction and commissioning ==
Perch, with hull number P-5 and her crew on deck, at New London, Connecticut, 19 December 1936

Perchs keel was laid down on 25 February 1935 by the Electric Boat Company, in Groton, Connecticut. She was launched on 9 May 1936, sponsored by Mrs. Helen Lorena Withers (ne LaBar), wife of Captain (later Admiral) Thomas Withers, Jr., then assigned to Naval Submarine Base New London at Groton. She was commissioned on 19 November 1936.

== Service history ==
=== Interwar period ===
After shakedown in the North Atlantic Ocean, Perch became a unit of the United States Pacific Fleet when she joined Submarine Squadron 6 (SubRon 6) in November 1937. The following spring, she was engaged in the annual fleet problem and did some work on a survey of the Aleutian Islands, entering the Bering Sea on 28 February. In the spring of 1939, Perch operated with the fleet on its cruise to the United States East Coast.

In October 1939, Perch departed San Diego, California, for Manila, where she became a division flagship and made a summer cruise in 1940 to Tsingtao and Shanghai. She spent the year preceding World War II in operations around the Philippines. A week before Japan's attack on Pearl Harbor, Perch met two transports off Shanghai and escorted the 4th Marine Regiment from China to the Philippines.

=== World War II ===
At the outbreak of hostilities on 8 December 1941 (7 December in Hawaii on the other side of the International Date Line), Perch, commanded by David A. Hurt, was in Cavite Navy Yard. She took part in the rush to clear the navy yard on 10 December and watched, at close range, the destruction of Cavite by Japanese bombers. That night, Perch slipped through the Corregidor minefields and scouted between Luzon and Formosa (now Taiwan) in search of targets. Failing to detect any, she shifted to an area off Hong Kong, and on the evening of 25 December 1941, she launched four torpedoes at a large merchant ship, all missing. A few days later, she torpedoed and sank the Japanese cargo ship Nojima Maru. Japanese escorts prevented Perch from observing the kill.

Perch proceeded south to Darwin, Australia, to repair damage, making several unsuccessful attacks en route. She next made a patrol to Kendari, Celebes (now Sulawesi), where she scouted the harbor and made several attempts to get through the narrow entrance to an attack position.

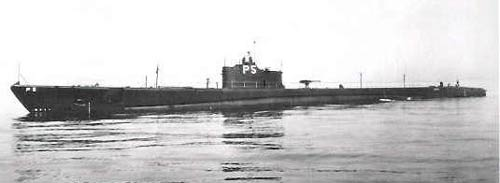
Perch shortly after commissioning, 19 November 1936

After a week of close contact with the Japanese while obtaining information, Perch headed south, searching for targets. In a night attack on a large merchant ship off the eastern coast of Celebes, Perch was hit in the superstructure, forward of the pressure hull of the conning tower, by a high-explosive round, which blew away the bridge deck, punctured the antenna trunk, and temporarily put her radio out of commission. Her crew made repairs on deck at night in waters heavily patrolled by the Japanese, and Perch headed for the Java Sea.

=== Final battle ===
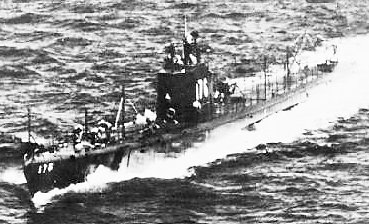
Perch underway in the fall of 1936

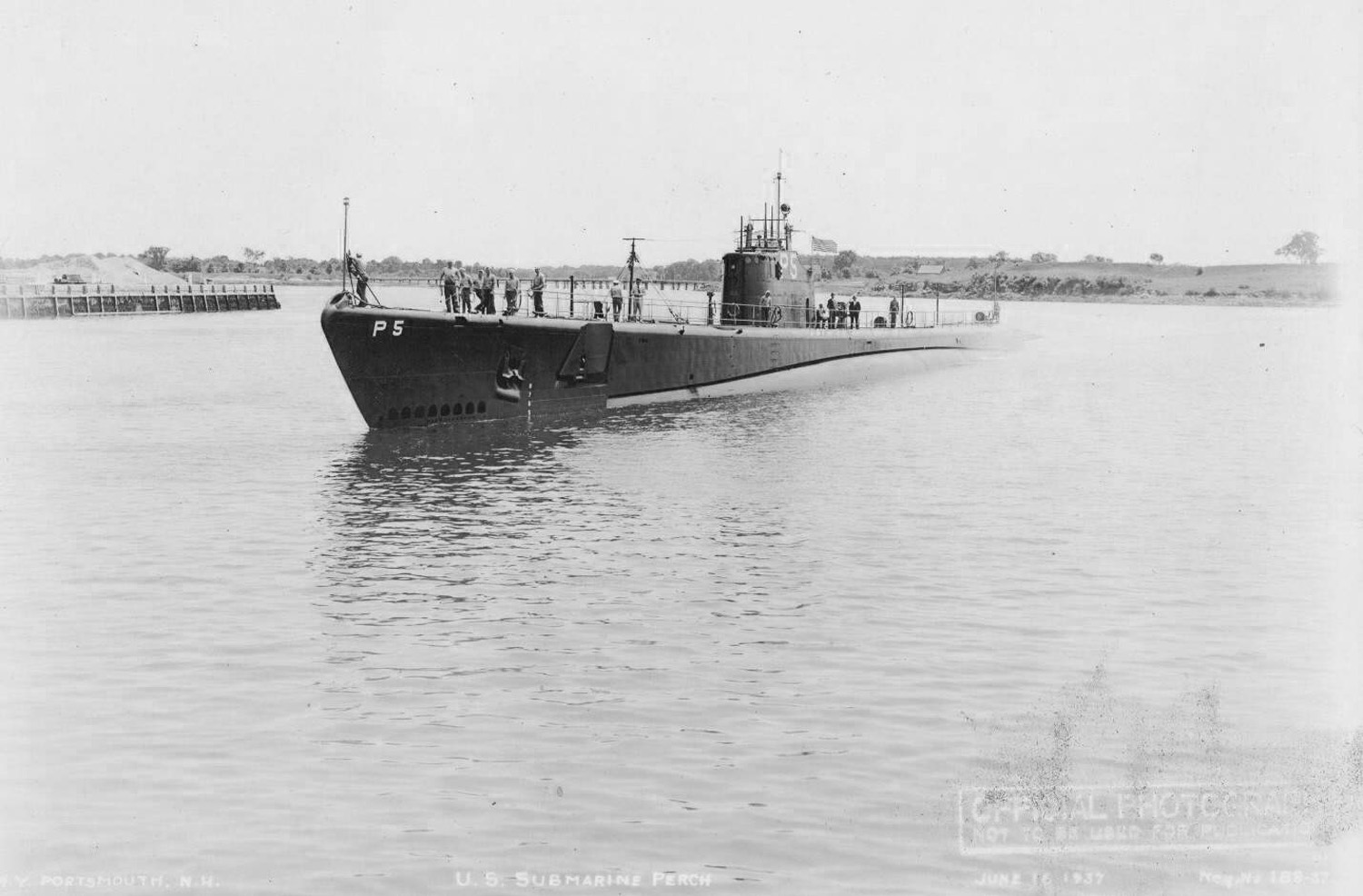
Perch off Portsmouth New Hampshire, 16 June 1937

On the evening of 1 March 1942, Perch surfaced 30 nautical miles (56 km; 35 mi) northwest of Surabaya, Java, and started in for an attack on a Japanese convoy landing troops to the west of Surabaya, but before this could be done, Perch happened to run into two Japanese destroyers, the Amatsukaze and Hatsukaze. Spotters on Amatsukaze located the submarine and fired off 32 5-inch (127 mm) shells, forcing Perch to crash dive, and seemed to do so successfully, swerving into firing range for a potential kill, observing the enemy destroyers waiting for the right time to unleash the torpedoes, but upon a final inspection through the periscope, the destroyers were preparing a depth-charge attack. Hoping to score a kill before the reverse happened, Perch climbed to around 90 feet deep, but too late; Amatsukaze and Hatsukaze were right on top of her and together dropped 12 depth charges. The first pattern missed its mark, but a second pattern of four depth charges gouged Perch and inflicted considerable damage. The entire pressure hull and a section of the conning tower were dented up to 2 feet (61 cm) inwards, likely damaging her hull beyond repair, and several ventilation valves were jammed shut, major leaking occurred through the ship's doors and gaskets, and around 90% of the ship's instruments and gauges were broken or destroyed. Amatsukaze and Hatsukaze assumed their target had perished and continued on, but Perch had enough integrity to remain under water, surfacing after 2 hours in the early morning of the 2 March and began sailing for repairs. Upon surfacing, the crew discovered practically every window was shattered, both periscope tubes were flooded, and only half the main engines were operable. Perch has survived her encounter, but still suffered critical damage, yet still continued in hopes of attacking Japanese ships.

Because of this, 2 hours later just before sunrise, Perch was spotted yet again by the Japanese destroyers Ushio and Sazanami, prompting the submarine to immediately dive to 200 feet, but again too late. Ushio and Sazanami dropped a depth-charge attack, and the damage inflicted to Perch went from bad to worse. Perch attempted to maneuver away, but her crew discovered the propulsion system to be completely inoperable, as Ushio and Sazanami further depth-charge attacked their enemy. Perch lay motionless underwater, and when sunrise broke, Ushio and Sazanami launched a final attack, which caused the most critical damage of all before leaving the area, concluding they had sunk their target.

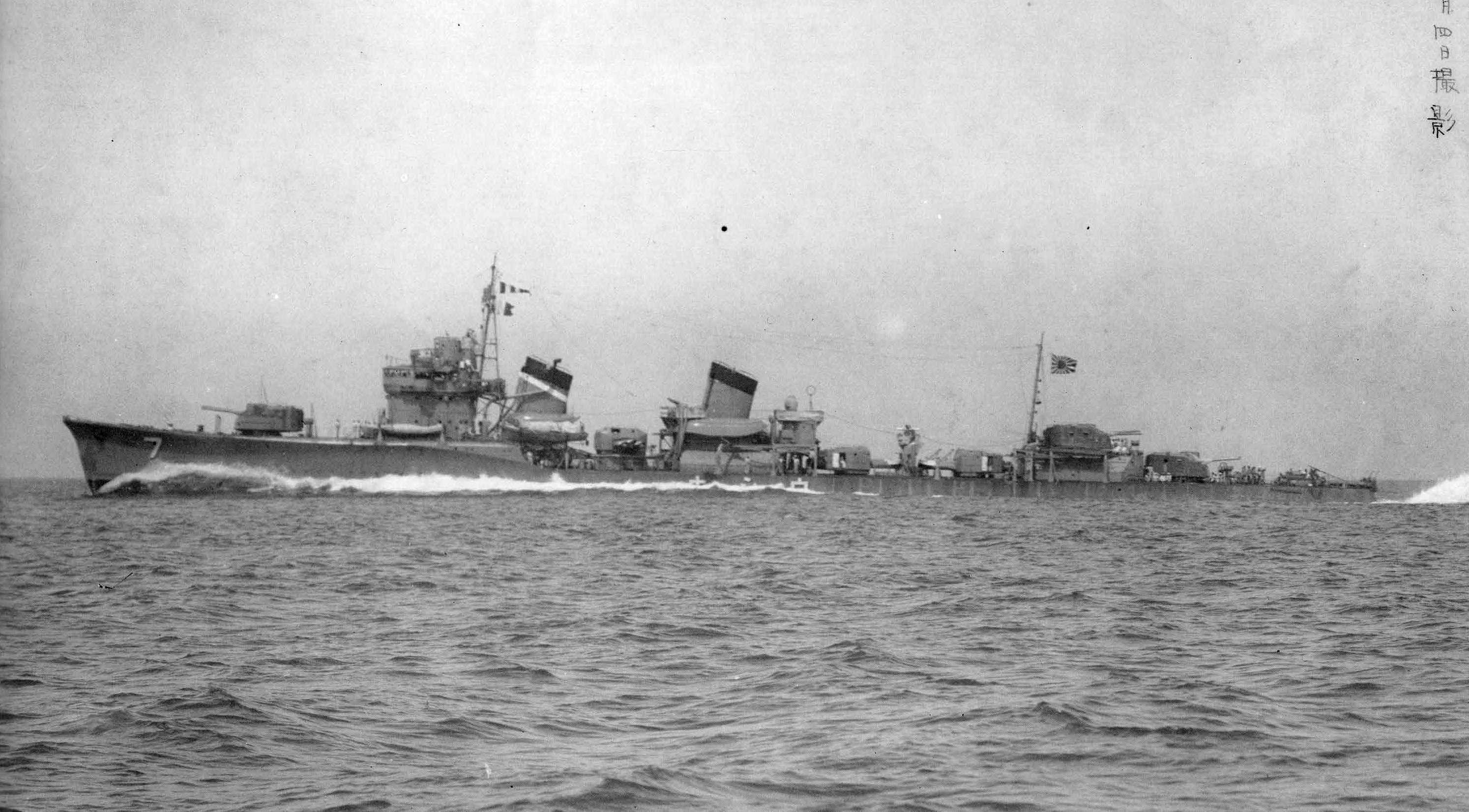
Japanese destroyer Ushio, the deliverer of Perch's final moments

Perch was forced to surface, and if Amatsukaze and Hatsukaze had damaged her severely, Ushio and Sazanami had left her bordering on sinking. Upon resurfacing, seawater flooded the pressure hull, leaked in heat and humidity made the ship's interior unbearable, and the ship was completely dead in the water. Damage-control efforts eventually got just one of her four engines running, limiting Perch to just 5 knots. An attempt to dive was made, but it almost sank the ship, and the crew found out that Perch was completely incapable of underwater travel, so resurfaced for the last time.

By the evening of the 3 March, the idea to simply scuttle Perch was brought up, but her crew held off the order as the crippled submarine desperately limped toward repairs. While the crew was attempting to repair the watertight hatches on the deck, the Ushio and Sazanami, which were still on patrol duty, happened to run into the submarine yet again. Sazanami chose not to attack, but Ushio fired her main battery. As soon as the first shell hit the conning tower, several hull valves were opened in an attempt to scuttle the boat, followed by her crew jumping into the water. Perch made her last dive as she slipped beneath the waves, and the destroyer ceased firing. Perch's entire crew of 59 men escaped the ship and were struggling in the water when Ushio came to their rescue. All of the men were rescued by Ushio, which transported them to prison camps in the freshly captured Dutch East Indies. Besides five who died from malnutrition, all of them returned to their families on V-J Day.

=== Wreck ===
On 23 November 2006, Thanksgiving Day in the United States, the wreck of Perch unexpectedly was located by an international team of divers aboard MV Empress while searching for the wreck of the British heavy cruiser HMS Exeter northwest of Bawean Island in the Java Sea. The expedition had hoped to locate and photograph the wreck of Exeter, sunk in the same area on 1 March 1942. The wreck of Perch was illegally salvaged sometime between 2012 and 2016 and no longer exists. Unlike the Dutch and British ships near her, which also were scavenged illegally, Perch was not a war grave, as she had been abandoned by her crew without fatalities.

== Awards ==
- Asiatic-Pacific Campaign Medal with one battle star for World War II service

Lieutenant Kenneth G. Schacht was awarded a Navy Cross for assisting in the scuttling of Perch, thus preventing the Japanese from capturing classified code books, materials, and equipment.

== In media ==
Perch is the subject of an episode of the syndicated television anthology series The Silent Service, which aired in the U.S. during the 1957–1958 television season.
