= Japanese destroyer Hinoki (1944) =

World War II Matsu-class destroyer

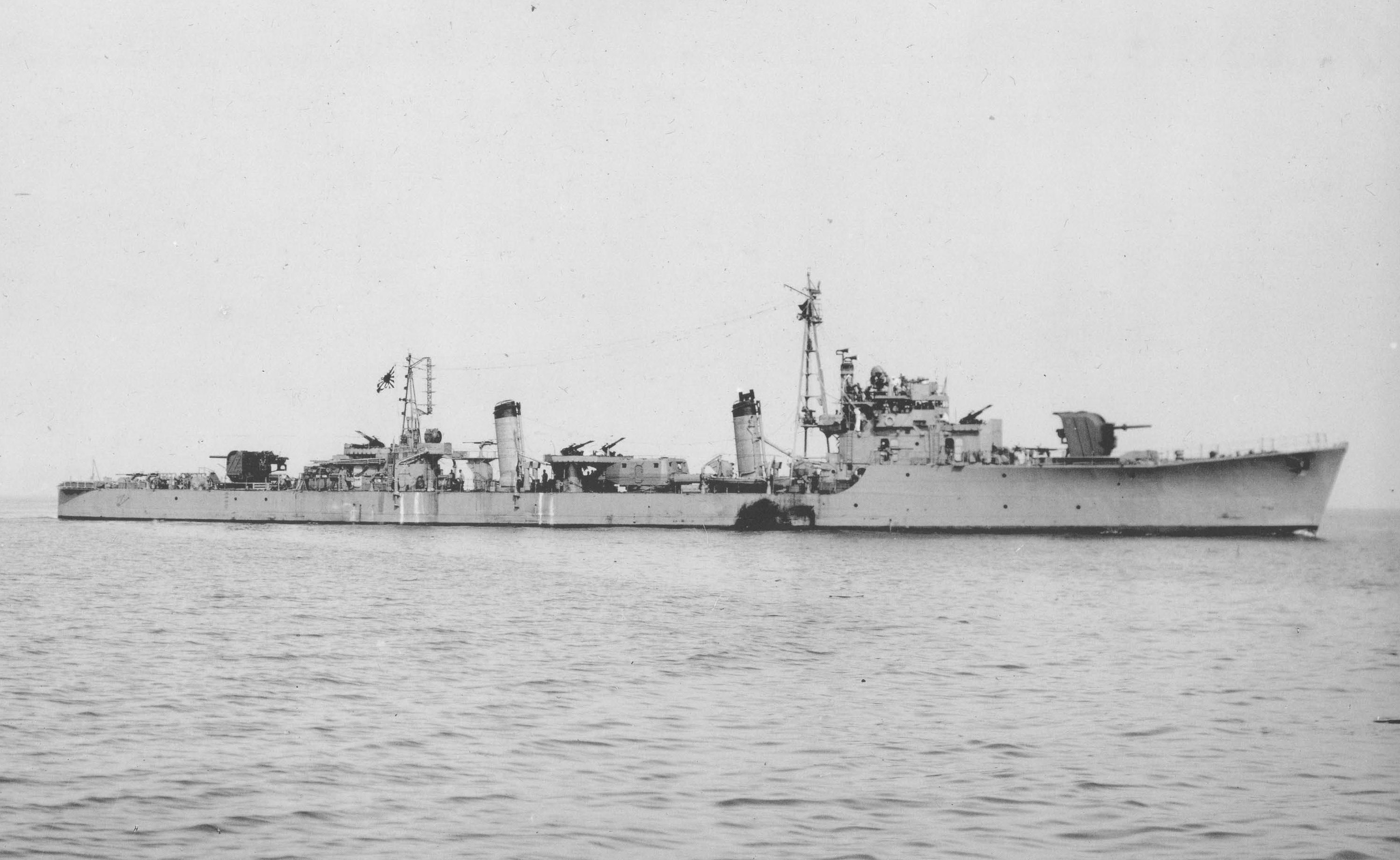
- Sister ship Momi, 4 September 1944

History

Empire of Japan
- Name: Hinoki
- Namesake: Japanese cypress
- Builder: Yokosuka Naval Arsenal
- Laid down: 4 March 1944
- Launched: 4 July 1944
- Completed: 30 September 1944
- Stricken: 10 April 1945
- Fate: Sunk by gunfire, 7 January 1945

General characteristics (as built)
- Class & type: Matsu-class escort destroyer
- Displacement: 1,282 t (1,262 long tons) (standard)
- Length: 100 m (328 ft 1 in) (o/a)
- Beam: 9.35 m (30 ft 8 in)
- Draft: 3.3 m (10 ft 10 in)
- Installed power: 2 × water-tube boilers; 19,000 shp (14,000 kW)
- Propulsion: 2 shafts, 2 × geared steam turbines
- Speed: 27.8 knots (51.5 km/h; 32.0 mph)
- Range: 4,680 nmi (8,670 km; 5,390 mi) at 16 knots (30 km/h; 18 mph)
- Complement: 210
- Sensors & processing systems: 1 × Type 22 search radar; 1 × Type 13 early-warning radar
- Armament: 1 × twin, 1 × single 127 mm (5 in) DP guns; 4 × triple, 13 × single 25 mm (1 in) AA guns; 1 × quadruple 610 mm (24 in) torpedo tubes; 2 × rails, 2 × throwers for 36 depth charges

Hinoki (檜; "Japanese cypress") was one of 18 Matsu-class escort destroyers built for the Imperial Japanese Navy (IJN) during World War II. Completed in September 1944, the ship began convoy escort duty on 25 October. She damaged an American submarine in December after it had sunk the aircraft carrier Unryū in one of her convoys. In January 1945, Hinoki was one of the escorts for a convoy to Manila, the Philippines. While trying to leave Manila Harbor several days later, her small convoy was discovered by the Americans and fruitlessly engaged by American and Australian ships detached from their own convoy. After the Allied ships had disengaged, the Japanese ships were attacked by American aircraft that sank one of Hinoki's sister ships and damaged Hinoki. Two days later the destroyer attempted to leave Manila again, but she was discovered not long afterwards by American destroyers who sank her in a gun duel with the loss of all hands.

== Design and description ==
Designed for ease of production, the Matsu class was smaller, slower and more lightly armed than previous destroyers as the IJN intended them for second-line duties like escorting convoys, releasing the larger ships for missions with the fleet. The ships measured 100 meters (328 ft 1 in) long overall, with a beam of 9.35 meters (30 ft 8 in) and a draft of 3.3 meters (10 ft 10 in). Their crew numbered 210 officers and enlisted men. They displaced 1,282 metric tons (1,262 long tons) at standard load and 1,554 metric tons (1,529 long tons) at deep load. The ships had two Kampon geared steam turbines, each driving one propeller shaft, using steam provided by two Kampon water-tube boilers. The turbines were rated at a total of 19,000 shaft horsepower (14,000 kW) for a speed of 27.8 knots (51.5 km/h; 32.0 mph). The Matsus had a range of 4,680 nautical miles (8,670 km; 5,390 mi) at 16 knots (30 km/h; 18 mph).

The main armament of the Matsu-class ships consisted of three 127-millimeter (5 in) Type 89 dual-purpose guns in one twin-gun mount aft and one single mount forward of the superstructure. The single mount was partially protected against spray by a gun shield. The accuracy of the Type 89 guns was severely reduced against aircraft because no high-angle gunnery director was fitted. The ships carried a total of twenty-five 25-millimeter (1 in) Type 96 anti-aircraft guns in 4 triple and 13 single mounts. The Matsus were equipped with Type 13 early-warning and Type 22 surface-search radars. The ships were also armed with a single rotating quadruple mount amidships for 610-millimeter (24 in) torpedoes. They could deliver their 36 depth charges via two stern rails and two throwers.

== Construction and career ==
Authorized in the late 1942 Modified 5th Naval Armaments Supplement Program, Hinoki was laid down on 4 March 1944 at the Yokosuka Naval Arsenal and launched on 7 July. Upon her completion on 30 September, the ship was assigned to Destroyer Squadron 11 of the Combined Fleet for training. From 25 October to 2 November, Hinoki escorted the aircraft carriers Ryūhō and Kaiyō as they ferried supplies from Sasebo, Japan, to Keelung, Japanese Taiwan. The ship was assigned to Destroyer Division 52 on 15 November and Commander Iwagami Juichi assumed command of the destroyer while serving as the division's commander. Five days later the division was transferred to Escort Squadron 31 of the 5th Fleet. She was part of the escort for the carrier Unryū on a ferry mission to Manila, the Philippines when the carrier was torpedoed and sunk by the American submarine USS Redfish on 19 December. Hinoki damaged the submarine with depth charges and was briefly diverted to Takao, Taiwan, before proceeding to Manila on 22–24 December. The day after her arrival, the ship steamed for Cape St. Jacques in the Japanese-occupied French Indochina. On 31 December Hinoki and her sister Momi helped to escort the ex-Italian reefer ship Ikutagawa Maru from Cape St. Jacques to Manila, arriving on 4 January 1945.

The following day the trio attempted to leave Manila for Indochina despite the presence of a nearby Allied convoy headed towards Lingayen Gulf. Their departure was spotted by American aircraft and the three ships comprising the convoy's escort attempted to intercept them. The destroyer USS Bennion led the two Australian ships, the frigate Gascoyne and the sloop Warrego towards the Japanese ships. The destroyer's radar picked up the Japanese convoy at 15:48 at a range of 23,300 yd (21,300 m) and her lookouts spotted the ships two minutes later. Bennion then slowed to the frigate's best speed of 20 knots (37 km/h; 23 mph) to allow her to catch up. Not long afterwards, the Allied ships were spotted in their turn by the Japanese who promptly reversed course back towards Manila. They opened fire at a range of 18,700 yards (17,100 m) at 15:57 and began making a smoke screen. Bennion replied a minute later and Gascoyne opened fire at 16:03, but it fell about a nautical mile short of the Japanese ships. The American ship increased her speed at 16:11 in an attempt to close the range and opened fire again at 16:24 at 17,400 yards (15,900 m) distance. The range had decreased to 14,300 yards (13,100 m) by 16:36 and the ship's captain ordered rapid and continuous fire a minute later. He broke off the engagement at 16:40 upon receiving notice that a large number of Japanese aircraft were inbound and having expended 349 rounds of ammunition with no effect; the Japanese return fire was equally ineffective. The report was incorrect, but the nearby escort carriers of Task Group 77.4.1 had launched 16 torpedo bombers, escorted by 19 fighters. Their attack sank Momi and they moderately damaged Hinoki with a torpedo hit, killing 21 and wounding 45 crewmen.

After emergency repairs were completed on 7 January, the ship attempted to depart Manila again, this time several hours after dark. The radar of the destroyer Charles Ausburne, one of four ships of Destroyer Squadron 23 escorting a convoy, acquired her at 21:15 at a range of 40,000 yards (37,000 m), but the contact was irregular enough that the ship's captain initially believed it was a false contact. An hour later, the radar was still picking up the Japanese ship and he ordered a speed increase to 25 knots (46 km/h; 29 mph) in an attempt to close and identify the blip. A star shell fired at 22:26 silhouetted Hinoki some 10,000 yards (9,100 m) away. The Japanese ship immediately turned away to bring her torpedoes to bear and missed with all of them as the Americans had been making evasive turns throughout the pursuit in case of lurking submarines. Hinoki was hit by multiple shells at 22:35 and immediately slowed. The Charles Ausburne went to rapid fire while closing the range to 1,100 yards (1,000 m) and sank the Japanese ship twenty minutes later at coordinates 14°30′N 119°30′E with the loss of all hands. Her return fire had frequently near-missed the American ship and her captain considered his ship lucky not have been hit. The IJN struck Hinoki from the navy list on 10 April.

== Bibliography ==
- Jentschura, Hansgeorg; Jung, Dieter & Mickel, Peter (1977). Warships of the Imperial Japanese Navy, 1869–1945. Annapolis, Maryland: United States Naval Institute. ISBN 0-87021-893-X.
- Nevitt, Allyn D. (1998). "IJN Hinoki: Tabular Record of Movement". Combined Fleet.
- O'Hara, Vincent P. (2007). The U.S. Navy Against the Axis: Surface Combat, 1941–1945. Annapolis: Naval Institute Press. ISBN 978-1-59114-650-6.
- Rohwer, Jürgen (2005). Chronology of the War at Sea 1939–1945: The Naval History of World War Two (Third Revised ed.). Annapolis, Maryland: Naval Institute Press. ISBN 1-59114-119-2.
- Stille, Mark (2013). Imperial Japanese Navy Destroyers 1919–45 (2): Asahio to Tachibana Classes. Botley, UK: Osprey Publishing. ISBN 978-1-84908-987-6.
- Sturton, Ian (1980). "Japan". In Chesneau, Roger (ed.). Conway's All the World's Fighting Ships 1922–1946. Greenwich, UK: Conway Maritime Press. ISBN 0-85177-146-7.
- Whitley, M. J. (1988). Destroyers of World War Two: An International Encyclopedia. Annapolis, Maryland: Naval Institute Press. ISBN 0-87021-326-1.
