= Japanese destroyer Momo (1944) =

Destroyer of the Imperial Japanese Navy

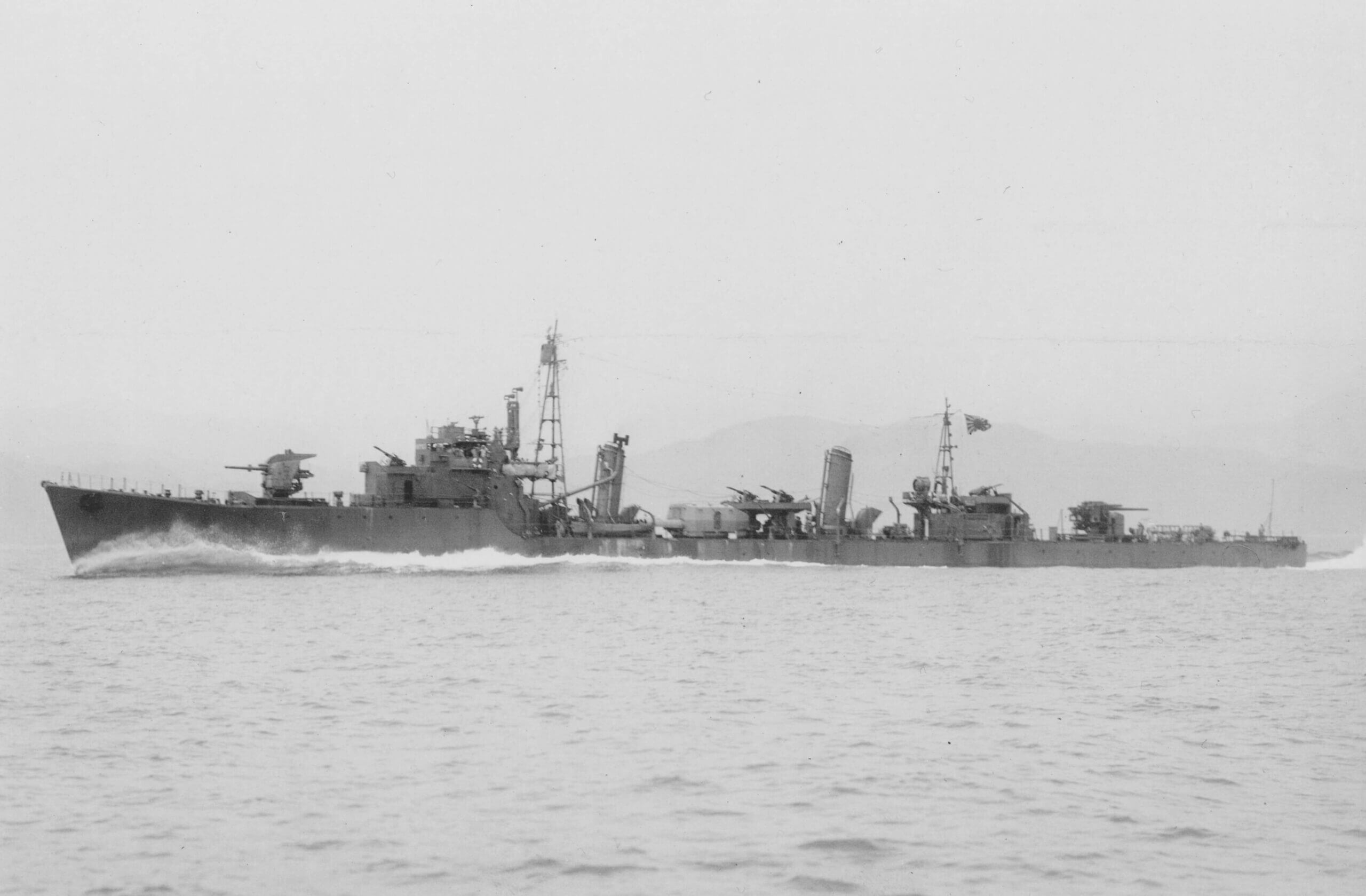
- Momo underway, 3 June 1944

History

Empire of Japan
- Name: Momo
- Namesake: Peach
- Builder: Maizuru Naval Arsenal
- Laid down: 5 November 1943
- Launched: 25 March 1944
- Completed: 10 June 1944
- Stricken: 10 February 1945
- Fate: Sunk by USS Hawkbill, 15 December 1944

General characteristics (as built)
- Class & type: Matsu-class escort destroyer
- Displacement: 1,282 t (1,262 long tons) (standard)
- Length: 100 m (328 ft 1 in) (o/a)
- Beam: 9.35 m (30 ft 8 in)
- Draft: 3.3 m (10 ft 10 in)
- Installed power: 2 × water-tube boilers; 19,000 shp (14,000 kW)
- Propulsion: 2 shafts, 2 × geared steam turbines
- Speed: 27.8 knots (51.5 km/h; 32.0 mph)
- Range: 4,680 nmi (8,670 km; 5,390 mi) at 16 knots (30 km/h; 18 mph)
- Complement: 210
- Sensors & processing systems: 1 × Type 22 search radar; 1 × Type 13 early-warning radar
- Armament: 1 × twin, 1 × single 127 mm (5 in) DP guns; 4 × triple, 8 × single 25 mm (1 in) AA guns; 1 × quadruple 610 mm (24 in) torpedo tubes; 2 × rails, 2 × throwers for 36 depth charges

Momo (桃; "Peach") was one of 18 Matsu-class escort destroyers built for the Imperial Japanese Navy during World War II. Completed in mid-1944, the ship spent her short career escorting troop and supply convoys. She played a minor role in the Battle of Ormoc Bay in early December, escorting a troop convoy in the Philippines. Momo was badly damaged by American aircraft while escorting a hell ship full of Japanese evacuees and Allied prisoners of war a week later from Manila, Philippines, to Japanese Taiwan. The destroyer was sunk by an American submarine on 15 December with the loss of 92 of her crew.

== Design and description ==
Designed for ease of production, the Matsu class was smaller, slower and more lightly armed than previous destroyers as the IJN intended them for second-line duties like escorting convoys, releasing the larger ships for missions with the fleet. The ships measured 100 meters (328 ft 1 in) long overall, with a beam of 9.35 meters (30 ft 8 in) and a draft of 3.3 meters (10 ft 10 in). Their crew numbered 210 officers and enlisted men. They displaced 1,282 metric tons (1,262 long tons) at standard load and 1,554 metric tons (1,529 long tons) at deep load. The ships had two Kampon geared steam turbines, each driving one propeller shaft, using steam provided by two Kampon water-tube boilers. The turbines were rated at a total of 19,000 shaft horsepower (14,000 kW) for a speed of 27.8 knots (51.5 km/h; 32.0 mph). The Matsus had a range of 4,680 nautical miles (8,670 km; 5,390 mi) at 16 knots (30 km/h; 18 mph).

The main armament of the Matsu-class ships consisted of three 127-millimeter (5 in) Type 89 dual-purpose guns in one twin-gun mount aft and one single mount forward of the superstructure. The single mount was partially protected against spray by a gun shield. The accuracy of the Type 89 guns was severely reduced against aircraft because no high-angle gunnery director was fitted. The ships carried a total of twenty 25-millimeter (1 in) Type 96 anti-aircraft guns in 4 triple and 8 single mounts. The Matsus were equipped with a Type 22 surface-search radar. The ships were also armed with a single rotating quadruple mount amidships for 610-millimeter (24 in) torpedoes. They could deliver their 36 depth charges via two stern rails and two throwers.

Momo probably was not initially fitted with a Type 13 early-warning radar. The radar and 5 additional 25 mm guns on single mounts may have been installed before her loss.

== Construction and career ==
Authorized in the late 1942 Modified 5th Naval Armaments Supplement Program, Momo (peach) was laid down by the Maizuru Naval Arsenal on 5 November 1943 and launched on 25 March 1944. Upon her completion on 10 June 1944, Momo was assigned to Destroyer Squadron 11 of the Combined Fleet for training and then the 43rd Destroyer Division of Destroyer Squadron 11 on 15 July. The division was transferred to the 31st Escort Squadron of the 5th Fleet on 20 August.

Between 25 October and 2 November, together with her sister ships Momi and Ume, she escorted the aircraft carriers Ryūhō and Kaiyō on a transport mission from Sasebo to Keelung, Japanese Taiwan, then returned to Kure. Momi's captain served as the commander of the destroyer division during the voyage. The division's next task was to escort the hybrid battleship/carriers Hyūga and her sister Ise as they ferried supplies to Manila, Philippines, on 9 November. American air raids deterred the battleships from completing the journey, and the ships were diverted to the Spratly Islands; the battleships' cargo was transferred to fast transports on 15–16 November, while the light cruiser Isuzu, Momo and two other destroyers proceeded to Manila Bay. They docked in Manila on 18 November and departed for Brunei the next day. Isuzu was struck by a torpedo from the submarine Hake en route. The cruiser was diverted to Singapore for temporary repairs, escorted by Momo and her sister Sugi.

On 24 November, Momo and the destroyer Shimotsuki departed Singapore for Manila to support the "TA" resupply missions to Japanese positions in the Philippines. Shimotsuki was hit the following day by four torpedoes fired by the American submarine USS Cavalla that caused a magazine to explode. Momo made an unsuccessful search for the submarine, then rescued 46 survivors.

=== Battle of Ormoc Bay ===
The Battle of Ormoc Bay was a part of the larger Battle of Leyte. Momo was assigned to TA No. 8 along with Ume, Sugi, and the sub-chasers Ch.18 and Ch.38. They were escorting five troopships carrying the 4,000 men of the 68th Brigade to Ormoc and departed on 5 December. American forces began landing a few miles south of Ormoc on 7 December, and the convoy was spotted by American aircraft that morning. Their initial attack was ineffective, but the convoy was diverted to the fishing port of San Isidro after it received word that the Americans were landing near their destination. Shortly after the transports began unloading, they were attacked by Marine Vought F4U Corsair fighter-bombers of VMF-211. The initial attacks hit one transport and caused her to run aground for the loss of three Corsairs. The convoy commander then ordered his ships to beach themselves and continue to unload their troops and equipment, while the escorts withdrew northward. Further attacks that afternoon damaged Ume and Sugi and sank two of the transports, while only one was able to beach itself. All told, the convoy was attacked by a total of 24 Corsairs, 86 Republic P-47 Thunderbolts and 43 Curtiss P-40 Warhawks. Momo later returned to render assistance to the transports, but there was little to be done. While attempting to rendezvous with Ume and Sugi that night, the ship suffered minor damage after she accidentally hit a reef off Masabate Island. Momo aborted the rendezvous and returned to Manila on 8 December by herself.

After repairs at Cavite Navy Yard, Momo and sub-chaser Ch.60 were assigned to escort the cargo liner Ōryoku Maru carrying 3,511 Japanese military personnel, civilians, and 1,619 Allied prisoners of war. The small convoy departed Manila on the morning of 14 December. Shortly after, they were attacked by planes from the aircraft carrier USS Hornet that severely damaged the Ōryoku Maru, which was forced to beach herself in Subic Bay lest she be sunk. The two escorts continued out to sea and were repeatedly attacked by American carrier aircraft. Momo was hit twice by bombs that started a fire amidships, forcing her captain to order her torpedoes be ejected overboard to prevent them from exploding. Flooding and other damage from the attacks reduced the destroyer's speed to 14 knots (26 km/h; 16 mph), but continuing American attacks prevented the ship from turning back for repairs, so the two ships proceeded towards Takao, Japanese Taiwan. On the evening of 15 December, the submarine USS Hawkbill attacked Momo; one torpedo struck the ship in the aft boiler room, which caused her to lose power and sink 140 miles (230 km) west-southwest of the coast of Cape Bolinao, Luzon. Ch.60 rescued the survivors, but 92 crewmen were killed and 36 wounded. Momo was stricken from the navy list on 10 February 1945.

== Bibliography ==
- Hackett, Bob (2017). "Oryoku Maru: Tabular Record of Movement". www.combinedfleet.com.
- Hammel, Eric (1998). Air War Pacific Chronology: America's Air War against Japan in East Asia and the Pacific, 1941–1945. Pacifica, California: Pacifica Press. ISBN 0-935553-26-6.
- Jentschura, Hansgeorg; Jung, Dieter & Mickel, Peter (1977). Warships of the Imperial Japanese Navy, 1869–1945. Annapolis, Maryland: United States Naval Institute. ISBN 0-87021-893-X.
- Nevitt, Allyn D. (1998). "IJN Momo: Tabular Record of Movement". www.combinedfleet.com.
- Rohwer, Jürgen (2005). Chronology of the War at Sea 1939–1945: The Naval History of World War Two (Third Revised ed.). Annapolis, Maryland: Naval Institute Press. ISBN 1-59114-119-2.
- Stille, Mark (2013). Imperial Japanese Navy Destroyers 1919–45 (2): Asahio to Tachibana Classes. Botley, UK: Osprey Publishing. ISBN 978-1-84908-987-6.
- Sturton, Ian (1980). "Japan". In Chesneau, Roger (ed.). Conway's All the World's Fighting Ships 1922–1946. Greenwich, UK: Conway Maritime Press. ISBN 0-85177-146-7.
- Whitley, M. J. (1988). Destroyers of World War Two: An International Encyclopedia. Annapolis, Maryland: Naval Institute Press. ISBN 0-87021-326-1.
