= Japanese destroyer Ume (1944) =

Destroyer of the Imperial Japanese Navy

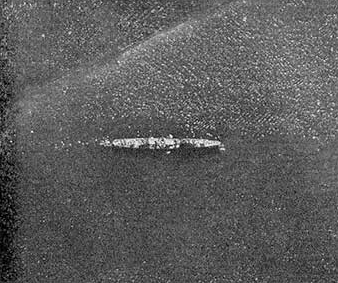
- Ume anchored off Hong Kong, 11 January 1945

History

Empire of Japan
- Name: Ume
- Namesake: Japanese apricot
- Builder: Fujinagata Shipyards, Osaka
- Laid down: 25 January 1944
- Launched: 24 April 1944
- Completed: 28 June 1944
- Stricken: 10 March 1945
- Fate: Sunk by aircraft, 31 January 1945

General characteristics (as built)
- Class & type: Matsu-class escort destroyer
- Displacement: 1,282 t (1,262 long tons) (standard)
- Length: 100 m (328 ft 1 in) (o/a)
- Beam: 9.35 m (30 ft 8 in)
- Draft: 3.3 m (10 ft 10 in)
- Installed power: 2 × water-tube boilers; 19,000 shp (14,000 kW)
- Propulsion: 2 shafts, 2 × geared steam turbines
- Speed: 27.8 knots (51.5 km/h; 32.0 mph)
- Range: 4,680 nmi (8,670 km; 5,390 mi) at 16 knots (30 km/h; 18 mph)
- Complement: 210
- Sensors & processing systems: 1 × Type 22 search radar; 1 × Type 13 early-warning radar
- Armament: 1 × twin, 1 × single 127 mm (5 in) DP guns; 4 × triple, 8 × single 25 mm (1 in) AA guns; 1 × quadruple 610 mm (24 in) torpedo tubes; 2 × rails, 2 × throwers for 36 depth charges

Ume (梅; "Japanese apricot") was one of 18 Matsu-class escort destroyers built for the Imperial Japanese Navy (IJN) near the end of World War II. Completed in mid-1944, the ship spent her short career escorting troop and supply convoys. She played a minor role in the Battle of Ormoc Bay in early December, escorting a troop convoy in the Philippines, and was damaged there by American aircraft a week later. After repairs that lasted until January 1945, the ship led a small group of destroyers back to the Philippines in an attempt to evacuate aircrew, but was sunk by American bombers near Japanese Taiwan on the last day of the month.

== Design and description ==
Designed for ease of production, the Matsu class was smaller, slower and more lightly armed than previous destroyers as the IJN intended them for second-line duties like escorting convoys, releasing the larger ships for missions with the fleet. The ships measured 100 meters (328 ft 1 in) long overall, with a beam of 9.35 meters (30 ft 8 in) and a draft of 3.3 meters (10 ft 10 in). Their crew numbered 210 officers and enlisted men. They displaced 1,282 metric tons (1,262 long tons) at standard load and 1,554 metric tons (1,529 long tons) at deep load. The ships had two Kampon geared steam turbines, each driving one propeller shaft, using steam provided by two Kampon water-tube boilers. The turbines were rated at a total of 19,000 shaft horsepower (14,000 kW) for a speed of 27.8 knots (51.5 km/h; 32.0 mph). The Matsus had a range of 4,680 nautical miles (8,670 km; 5,390 mi) at 16 knots (30 km/h; 18 mph).

The main armament of the Matsu-class ships consisted of three 127-millimeter (5 in) Type 89 dual-purpose guns in one twin-gun mount aft and one single mount forward of the superstructure. The single mount was partially protected against spray by a gun shield. The accuracy of the Type 89 guns was severely reduced against aircraft because no high-angle gunnery director was fitted. The ships carried a total of 20 Type 96 25-millimeter (1 in) anti-aircraft guns in four triple and eight single mounts. The Matsus were equipped with a Type 22 surface-search radar. The ships were also armed with a single rotating quadruple mount amidships for 610-millimeter (24 in) torpedoes. They could deliver their 36 depth charges via two stern rails and two throwers.

Ume probably was not initially fitted with a Type 13 early-warning radar. The radar and five additional 25 mm guns on single mounts were installed in late 1944.

== Construction and career ==
Authorized in the late 1942 Modified 5th Naval Armaments Supplement Program, Ume (Japanese apricot) was laid down by Fujinagata Shipyards at their facility in Osaka on 1 December 1943 and launched on 24 April 1944. Upon her completion on 10 June 1944, Ume was assigned to Destroyer Squadron 11 of the Combined Fleet for training and then the 43rd Destroyer Division of Destroyer Squadron 11 on 15 July. The division was transferred to the 31st Escort Squadron of the 5th Fleet on 20 August.

Together with her sister ships Momi and Momo, Ume escorted the aircraft carriers Ryūhō and Kaiyō on a transport mission from Sasebo to Keelung, Japanese Taiwan, then returned to Kure, between 25 October and 2 November. The division's next task was to escort the hybrid battleship/carriers Hyūga and her sister Ise as they ferried supplies to Manila, Philippines, on 9 November. American air raids deterred the battleships from completing the journey, and the ships were diverted to the Spratly Islands. She then joined the escort for the 2nd Fleet during their movement from Brunei to Mako, Japanese Taiwan.

=== Battle of Ormoc Bay ===
The Battle of Ormoc Bay was a part of the larger Battle of Leyte. Ume was assigned to TA No. 8 along with Momo, Sugi, and the sub-chasers Ch.18 and Ch.38; Ume's captain served as the convoy commander. They were escorting five troopships carrying the 4,000 men of the 68th Brigade to Ormoc and departed on 5 December. American forces began landing a few miles south of Ormoc on 7 December, and the convoy was spotted by American aircraft that morning. Their initial attack was ineffective, but the convoy was diverted to the fishing port of San Isidro after it received word that the Americans were landing near their destination. Shortly after the transports began unloading, they were attacked by Marine Vought F4U Corsair fighter-bombers of VMF-211. The initial attacks hit one transport and caused her to run aground for the loss of three Corsairs. The convoy commander then ordered his ships to beach themselves and continue to unload their troops and equipment, while the escorts withdrew northward. Further attacks that afternoon lightly damaged Ume and Sugi and sank two of the transports, while only one was able to beach itself. All told, the convoy was attacked by a total of 24 Corsairs, 86 Republic P-47 Thunderbolts and 43 Curtiss P-40 Warhawks. Ume arrived in Manila two days later.

The ship was moderately damaged by an American bomb on 15 December, and she sailed to Occupied Hong Kong for repairs. Ume arrived in Takao, Japanese Taiwan, on 20 January 1945. Ten days later, the ship led her sister Kaede and the destroyer Shiokaze on a mission to evacuate stranded aircrew from Aparri, Philippines. The next day a dozen North American B-25 Mitchells from the 822d Bombardment Squadron attacked the ships 20 miles (32 km) south of Taiwan, sinking Ume as well as damaging Kaede and Shiokaze. The latter ship rescued the survivors, but 77 men were killed and 36 wounded.

== Bibliography ==
- Futrell, Frank (1983) [1953]. Craven, Wesley F. & Cate, James L. (eds.). The Pacific: Matterhorn to Nagasaki: June 1944 to August 1945. The Army Air Forces in World War II. Vol. 5. Washington, D.C.: Office of Air Force History.
- Hammel, Eric (1998). Air War Pacific Chronology: America's Air War against Japan in East Asia and the Pacific, 1941–1945. Pacifica, California: Pacifica Press. ISBN 0-935553-26-6.
- Jentschura, Hansgeorg; Jung, Dieter & Mickel, Peter (1977). Warships of the Imperial Japanese Navy, 1869–1945. Annapolis, Maryland: United States Naval Institute. ISBN 0-87021-893-X.
- Nevitt, Allyn D. (1 January 2024). "IJN Momo: Tabular Record of Movement". www.combinedfleet.com.
- Nevitt, Allyn D. (7 January 2012). "IJN Ume: Tabular Record of Movement". www.combinedfleet.com.
- Stille, Mark (2013). Imperial Japanese Navy Destroyers 1919–45 (2): Asahio to Tachibana Classes. Botley, UK: Osprey Publishing. ISBN 978-1-84908-987-6.
- Sturton, Ian (1980). "Japan". In Chesneau, Roger (ed.). Conway's All the World's Fighting Ships 1922–1946. Greenwich, UK: Conway Maritime Press. ISBN 0-85177-146-7.
- Whitley, M. J. (1988). Destroyers of World War Two: An International Encyclopedia. Annapolis, Maryland: Naval Institute Press. ISBN 0-87021-326-1.
