= Japanese destroyer Momi (1944) =

Destroyer of the Imperial Japanese Navy

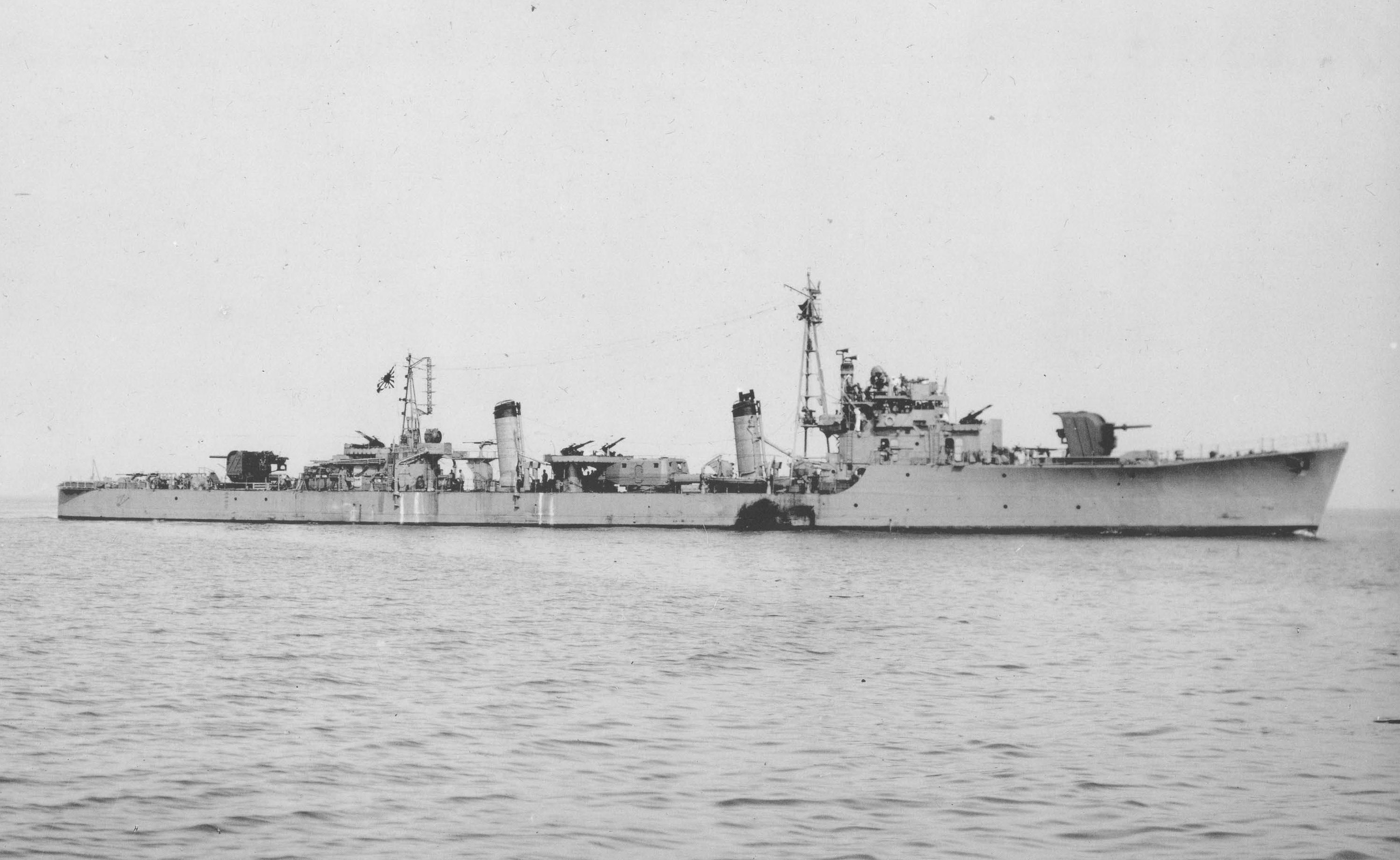
- Momi, 4 September 1944

History

Empire of Japan
- Name: Momi
- Ordered: 1942
- Builder: Yokosuka Naval Arsenal
- Laid down: 2 January 1944
- Launched: 16 June 1944
- Completed: 7 September 1944
- Stricken: 10 March 1945
- Fate: Sunk by aircraft, 5 January 1945

General characteristics (as built)
- Class & type: Matsu-class escort destroyer
- Displacement: 1,282 t (1,262 long tons) (standard)
- Length: 100 m (328 ft 1 in) (o/a)
- Beam: 9.35 m (30 ft 8 in)
- Draft: 3.3 m (10 ft 10 in)
- Installed power: 2 × water-tube boilers; 19,000 shp (14,000 kW)
- Propulsion: 2 shafts, 2 × geared steam turbines
- Speed: 27.8 knots (51.5 km/h; 32.0 mph)
- Range: 4,680 nmi (8,670 km; 5,390 mi) at 16 knots (30 km/h; 18 mph)
- Complement: 210
- Sensors & processing systems: 1 × Type 22 search radar; 1 × Type 13 early-warning radar
- Armament: 1 × twin, 1 × single 127 mm (5 in) DP guns; 4 × triple, 13 × single 25 mm (1 in) AA guns; 1 × quadruple 610 mm (24 in) torpedo tubes; 2 × rails, 2 × throwers for 36 depth charges

Momi (樅; translation: "White fir") was a Matsu-class destroyer of the Imperial Japanese Navy (IJN) built during World War II. Completed in late 1944, the ship was designed as an anti-submarine escort and defended convoys between Japan and its occupied territories during the war. She was sunk with the loss of all hands on 5 January 1945 by an American torpedo bomber in the South China Sea.

== Design and description ==
Designed for ease of production, the Matsu class was smaller, slower and more lightly armed than previous destroyers as the IJN intended them for second-line duties like escorting convoys, releasing the larger ships for missions with the fleet. The ships measured 100 meters (328 ft 1 in) long overall, with a beam of 9.35 meters (30 ft 8 in) and a draft of 3.3 meters (10 ft 10 in). Their crew numbered 210 officers and enlisted men. They displaced 1,282 metric tons (1,262 long tons) at standard load and 1,554 metric tons (1,529 long tons) at deep load. The ships had two Kampon geared steam turbines, each driving one propeller shaft using steam provided by two Kampon water-tube boilers. The turbines were rated at a total of 19,000 shaft horsepower (14,000 kW) for a speed of 27.8 knots (51.5 km/h; 32.0 mph). The Matsus had a range of 4,680 nautical miles (8,670 km; 5,390 mi) at 16 knots (30 km/h; 18 mph).

The main armament of the Matsu-class ships consisted of three 127-millimeter (5 in) Type 89 dual-purpose guns in one twin-gun mount aft and one single mount forward of the superstructure. The single mount was partially protected against spray by a gun shield. The accuracy of the Type 89 guns was severely reduced against aircraft because no high-angle gunnery director was fitted. The ships carried a total of 25 Type 96 25-millimeter (1 in) anti-aircraft guns in 4 triple and 13 single mounts. The Matsus were equipped with Type 13 early-warning and Type 22 surface-search radars. The ships were also armed with a single rotating quadruple mount amidships for 610-millimeter (24 in) torpedoes. They could deliver their 36 depth charges via two stern rails and two throwers.

== Construction and career ==
Authorized in the late 1942 Modified 5th Naval Armaments Supplement Program, Momi was laid down on 2 January 1944 at the Yokosuka Naval Arsenal and launched on 16 June. Upon her completion on 7 September, Kaya was assigned to Destroyer Squadron 11 of the Combined Fleet for training. Between 25 October and 2 November, together with the destroyer Hinoki, she escorted the aircraft carriers Ryūhō and Kaiyō on a transport mission from Sasebo to Keelung, Japanese Taiwan, then returned to Kure. She was assigned to Destroyer Division 52 on 15 November; the division was transferred to Escort Squadron 31 of the 5th Fleet five days later.

Together with the destroyers Shigure and Hinoki, Momi was part of the escort for the aircraft carrier Unryū in mid-December. Because an American invasion fleet had been spotted approaching the Philippine Islands, Unryū was intended to deliver a squadron of 30 Ohka kamikaze planes to Manila. The task force sailed west through the Shimonoseki Straits on 17 December to avoid American submarines, then turned south. Two days later, the convoy encountered the submarine USS Redfish which sank Unryū. Momi and Shigure picked up 146 survivors between them while Hinoki unsuccessfully attempted sink the American submarine. Momi and Hinoki shaped course for Takao, Japanese Taiwan, later that day and Shigure remained behind to find the Redfish. From there, they steamed to Manila, the Philippines, on 22–24 December and then to Cam Ranh Bay in occupied French Indochina and Cape St. Jacques on 25–28 December. From there the pair escorted the ex-Italian reefer ship Ikutagawa Maru from Cape St. Jacques to Manila, arriving on 4 January 1945.

The following day the trio attempted to leave Manila for Indochina despite the presence of a nearby Allied convoy headed towards Lingayen Gulf. The two destroyers were spotted by American aircraft as heading directly for their convoy, so the Ikutagawa Maru may have already separated herself from her escorts by this time, and the three ships comprising the convoy's escort attempted to intercept them. The American destroyer USS Bennion led the two Australian ships, the frigate Gascoyne and the sloop Warrego towards the Japanese ships. The destroyer's radar picked up the Japanese convoy at 15:48 at a range of 23,300 yd (21,300 m) and her lookouts spotted the ships two minutes later. Bennion then slowed to the frigate's best speed of 20 knots (37 km/h; 23 mph) to allow her to catch up. Not long afterwards, the Allied ships were spotted in their turn by the Japanese who promptly reversed course back towards Manila. They opened fire at a range of 18,700 yards (17,100 m) at 15:57 and began making a smoke screen. Bennion replied a minute later and Gascoyne opened fire at 16:03, but it fell about a nautical mile short of the Japanese ships. The American ship increased her speed at 16:11 in an attempt to close the range and opened fire again at 16:24 at 17,400 yards (15,900 m) distance. The range had decreased to 14,300 yards (13,100 m) by 16:36 and the ship's captain ordered rapid and continuous fire a minute later. The American destroyer reversed course at 16:40 when the ship's captain was informed that nearby American escort carriers Task Group 77.2 had launched an airstrike of 16 torpedo bombers and 19 fighters. By this time, Bennion was 30 nautical miles (56 km; 35 mi) from its convoy and had expended 349 five-inch rounds without scoring a single hit. Momi was hit by a torpedo and blew up with the loss of all hands at 14°0′N 120°20′E. The ship was stricken from the navy list on 10 March.

== Bibliography ==
- Hackett, Bob & Cundall, Peter (2017). "Freighter Ikutagawa Maru: Tabular Record of Movement". www.combinedfleet.com.
- Jentschura, Hansgeorg; Jung, Dieter & Mickel, Peter (1977). Warships of the Imperial Japanese Navy, 1869–1945. Annapolis, Maryland: United States Naval Institute. ISBN 0-87021-893-X.
- Nevitt, Allyn D. (1998). "IJN Momi: Tabular Record of Movement". www.combinedfleet.com.
- O'Hara, Vincent P. (2007). The U.S. Navy Against the Axis: Surface Combat, 1941–1945. Annapolis, Maryland: Naval Institute Press. ISBN 978-1-59114-650-6.
- Stille, Mark (2013). Imperial Japanese Navy Destroyers 1919–45 (2): Asahio to Tachibana Classes. Botley, UK: Osprey Publishing. ISBN 978-1-84908-987-6.
- Sturton, Ian (1980). "Japan". In Chesneau, Roger (ed.). Conway's All the World's Fighting Ships 1922–1946. Greenwich, UK: Conway Maritime Press. ISBN 0-85177-146-7.
- Tully, Anthony (5 October 1998). "Star-Crossed Sortie: The Last Voyage of Unryū and DesDiv 52". www.combinedfleet.com.
- Whitley, M. J. (1988). Destroyers of World War Two: An International Encyclopedia. Annapolis, Maryland: Naval Institute Press. ISBN 0-87021-326-1.
