= Mervyn S. Bennion =

US Navy Medal of Honor recipient (1887–1941)

Mervyn Sharp Bennion
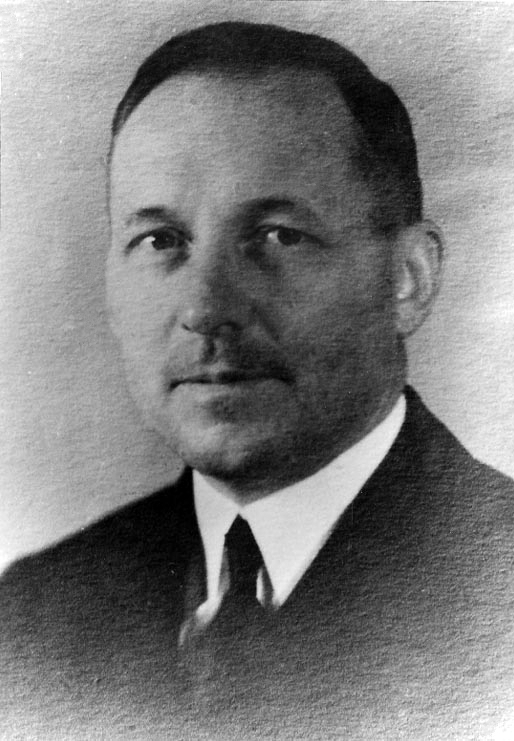
- Born: May 5, 1887; Vernon, Utah Territory
- Died: December 7, 1941 (aged 54); Pearl Harbor, Territory of Hawaii
- Burial place: Salt Lake City Cemetery, Salt Lake City, Utah
- Military career
- Allegiance: United States
- Branch: United States Navy
- Service years: 1910–1941
- Rank: Captain
- Commands: USS Bernadou (DD-153); Destroyer Division One; USS West Virginia (BB-48)
- Conflicts: World War I World War II: Attack on Pearl Harbor †
- Awards: Medal of Honor; Purple Heart

Mervyn Sharp Bennion (May 5, 1887 – December 7, 1941) was a United States Navy captain who served during World War I and was killed while he was in command of battleship USS West Virginia during the Japanese attack on Pearl Harbor in World War II. He posthumously received the Medal of Honor for "conspicuous devotion to duty, extraordinary courage, and complete disregard of his own life."

== Family background ==
Bennion was born in Vernon, Utah Territory on May 5, 1887. The religion of the family, which he shared, was the Church of Jesus Christ of Latter-day Saints. His Welsh grandfather, John Bennion, had immigrated to Utah with the Mormon pioneers and established successful cattle operations near Taylorsville, Utah. Bennion was living near Preston, Idaho when he received his acceptance to the United States Naval Academy. Bennion graduated third in his 1910 class from the academy. His Naval Academy classmates included Marc Mitscher and Charles Alan Pownall. His younger brother Howard Bennion graduated first in his class of 1912 at the United States Military Academy.

== Naval career ==
Bennion's first assignment after graduation was on the USS California in the engineering division. Subsequently, he was an ordnance and gunnery specialist serving in the Ordnance Bureau at Washington Navy Yard during World War I. Bennion's first command was the destroyer USS Bernadou, followed by command of Destroyer Division One. He assumed command of the USS West Virginia on July 2, 1941.

Bennion was killed in action during the Japanese attack on Pearl Harbor, December 7, 1941, while in command of the battleship USS West Virginia. He was mortally wounded by a shrapnel shard from the nearby USS Tennessee after she was hit by a bomb. Mess Attendant Second Class Doris Miller and several other sailors attempted to move Captain Bennion to a first aid station, but he refused to leave his post, eventually ordering his men to leave him and save themselves. Using one arm to hold his wounds closed, he died from loss of blood while still commanding his crew. Bennion was posthumously awarded the Medal of Honor.

Bennion is buried in the Salt Lake City Cemetery. On July 4, 1943, the destroyer USS Bennion (DD-662), named in his honor, was christened by his widow.

== Awards and honors ==

Medal of Honor		Purple Heart
Mexican Service Medal	Nicaraguan Campaign Medal	World War I Victory Medal w/ Destroyer clasp
American Defense Service Medal w/ Fleet clasp	Asiatic-Pacific Campaign Medal w/ Campaign star	World War II Victory Medal

=== Medal of Honor citation ===
Bennion's Medal of Honor citation reads:

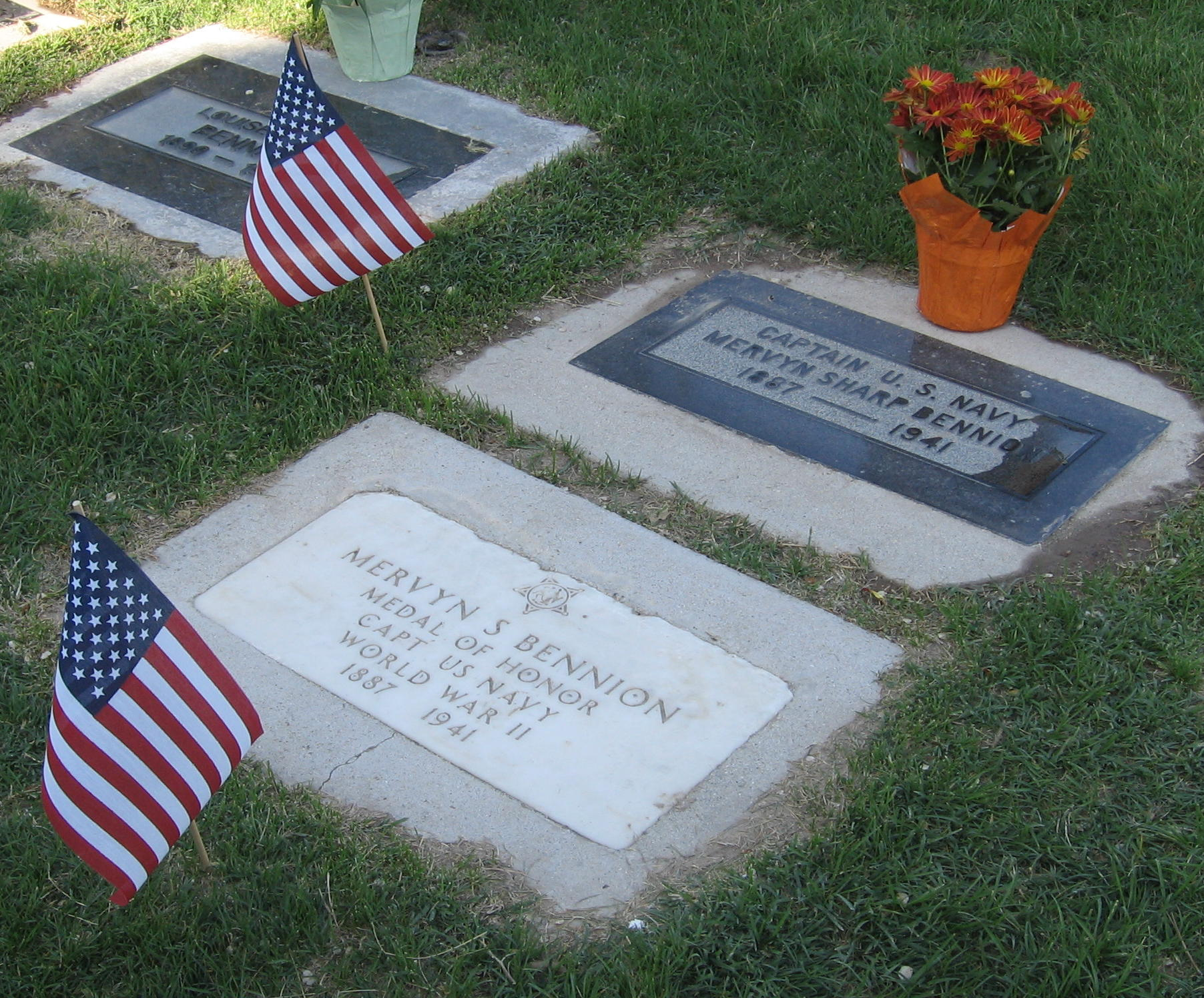
Bennion's grave marker

For conspicuous devotion to duty, extraordinary courage, and complete disregard of his own life, above and beyond the call of duty, during the attack on the Fleet in Pearl Harbor, by Japanese forces on 7 December 1941. As Commanding Officer of the USS West Virginia, after being mortally wounded, Capt. Bennion evidenced apparent concern only in fighting and saving his ship, and strongly protested against being carried from the bridge. (Note: Despite his grave injuries, he continued at his post trying to manage the situation. He was posthumously awarded the Medal of Honor. His conduct is regularly cited in training as the epitome of proper command deportment under fire.)

== See also ==
- List of Medal of Honor recipients for World War II

== Notes and references ==
=== General sources ===
- Sherman L. Fleek, Saints of Valor: Mormon Medal of Honor Recipients, (Salt Lake City: Greg Kofford Books) 2013, chapter 2.
- "Bennion". Dictionary of American Naval Fighting Ships. Naval History & Heritage Command, Department of the Navy. Archived from the original on 2006-07-21.
- "Bennion, Mervyn Sharp". US People. Naval History & Heritage Command, Department of the Navy. Archived from the original on February 17, 2001.
- "Mervyn S. Bennion, Captain, USS West Virginia, 1941". USSWestVirginia.org.
- "Bennion Family History". history.utah.gov. Archived from the original on May 13, 2008.
