= USS Bennion =

Fletcher-class destroyer

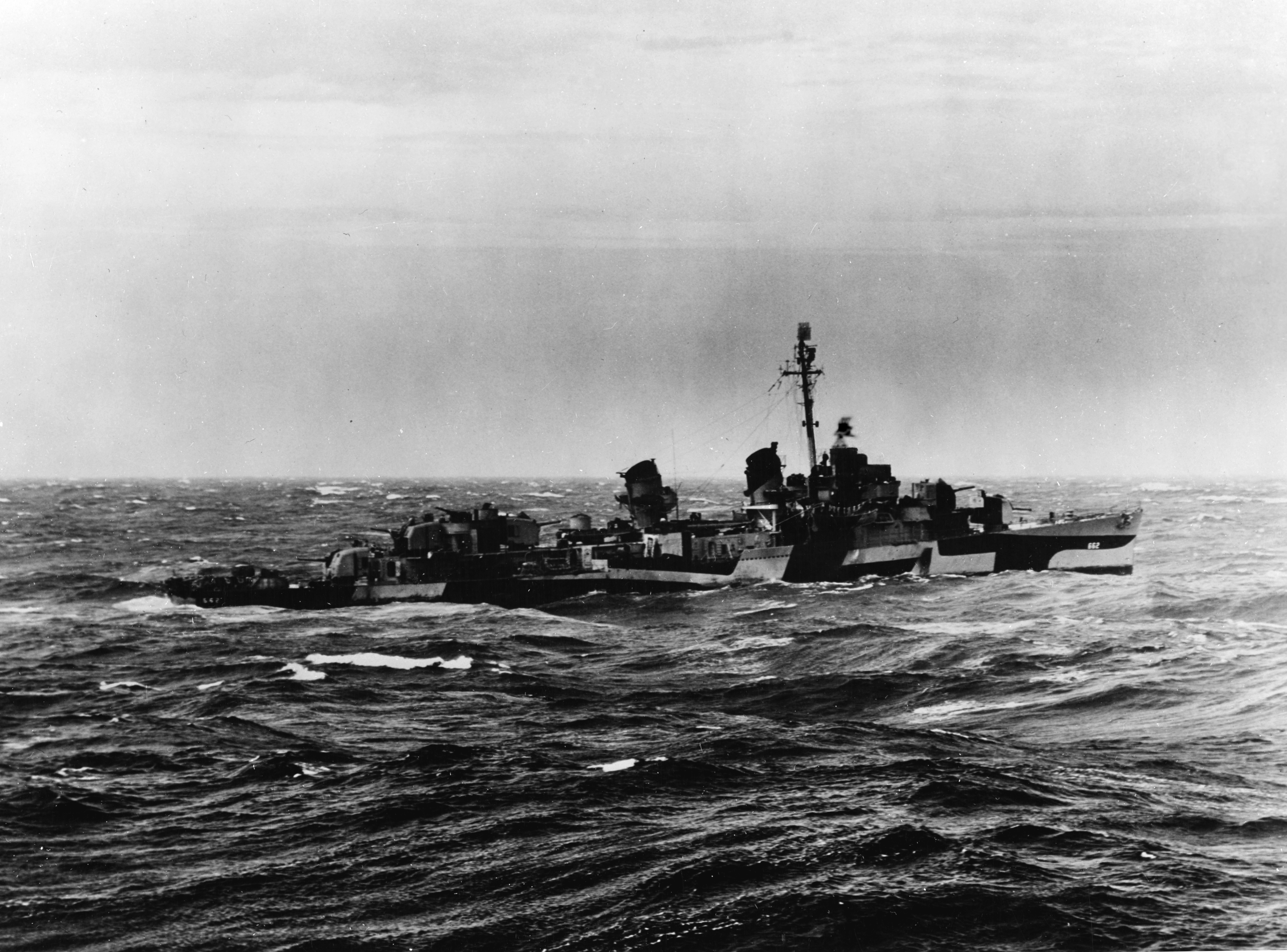
- USS Bennion (DD-662), 13 January 1945

History

United States
- Namesake: Mervyn S. Bennion
- Builder: Boston Navy Yard
- Laid down: 19 March 1943
- Launched: 4 July 1943
- Commissioned: 14 December 1943
- Decommissioned: 20 June 1946
- Stricken: 15 April 1971
- Honours and awards: 10 Battle Stars
- Fate: Sold for scrap, 30 May 1973

General characteristics
- Class & type: Fletcher-class destroyer
- Displacement: 2,050 tons
- Length: 376 ft 6 in (114.7 m)
- Beam: 39 ft 8 in (12.1 m)
- Draft: 17 ft 9 in (5.4 m)
- Propulsion: 60,000 shp (45 MW); 2 propellers
- Speed: 35 knots (65 km/h; 40 mph)
- Range: 6500 nm at 15 kn; (12,000 km at 28 km/h)
- Complement: 329 officers and men (1943)
- Armament: 5 × 5-inch 38 caliber guns, 4 × 40 mm AA guns, 4 × 20 mm AA guns, 10 × 21 inch (533 mm) torpedo tubes, 6 × depth charge projectors, 2 × depth charge tracks

USS Bennion (DD-662) was a Fletcher-class destroyer of the United States Navy. The ship was named for Captain Mervyn S. Bennion who was killed in action during the Japanese attack on Pearl Harbor, while in command of West Virginia. Captain Bennion was posthumously awarded the Medal of Honor.

Bennion was launched 4 July 1943 by Boston Navy Yard, sponsored by Captain Bennion's widow. It was commissioned 14 December 1943.

== Service history ==
On 5 January 1945, Bennion encountered two Japanese Matsu class destroyers, Hinoki and Momi, both returning to China after the aircraft carrier Unryu was torpedoed and sunk by USS Redfish (SS-395). Other US destroyers joined in the short fight, and both Japanese destroyers turned away, only for Momi to be caught, torpedoed and sunk by TBM Avengers of Task Force 77 shortly afterwards. Hinoki was later caught and sunk with all hands by gunfire of USS Charles Ausburne (DD-570) and three other destroyers.

Bennion departed Philadelphia, Pa. 3 March 1944 escorting the light aircraft carrier Bataan to the Pacific. Arriving at Pearl Harbor 22 March, she trained and patrolled in Hawaiian waters until 29 May 1944. Moving westward she served as a fighter director and radar picket ship during the following campaigns:

- Marianas Operation (10 June 1944 – 27 August 1944)
- Tinian Capture and Occupation (24 July 1944 – 1 August 1944)
- Western Caroline Islands Operation (31 August – 14 October 1944)
- Leyte Operation (10 October 1944 – 29 November 1944)
- Luzon Operation (12 December 1944 – 1 April 1945)
- Iwo Jima Operation (15 February 1945 – 16 March 1945)
- Okinawa Gunto Operation (Task Force 54, 17 March 1945 – 30 June 1945)
- Third Fleet Operations Against Japan (10 July 1945 – 15 August 1945)

During the Battle of Surigao Strait, in October 1944, Bennion assisted in, and was responsible for the torpedo that sunk the Japanese battleship Yamashiro. Future Chief of Naval Operations Lieutenant (junior grade) James L. Holloway III, served on the Bennion as officer in charge of the destroyer's main fire director. The full extent of Bennion's contribution to sinking the Yamashiro was not recognized until 2010.

Bennion returned to Puget Sound Navy Yard 27 October 1945 and went out of commission in reserve at Long Beach, Calif., 20 June 1946. The ship was stricken from the Naval Vessel Register 15 April 1971. She was sold 30 May 1973 and broken up for scrap.

== Awards ==
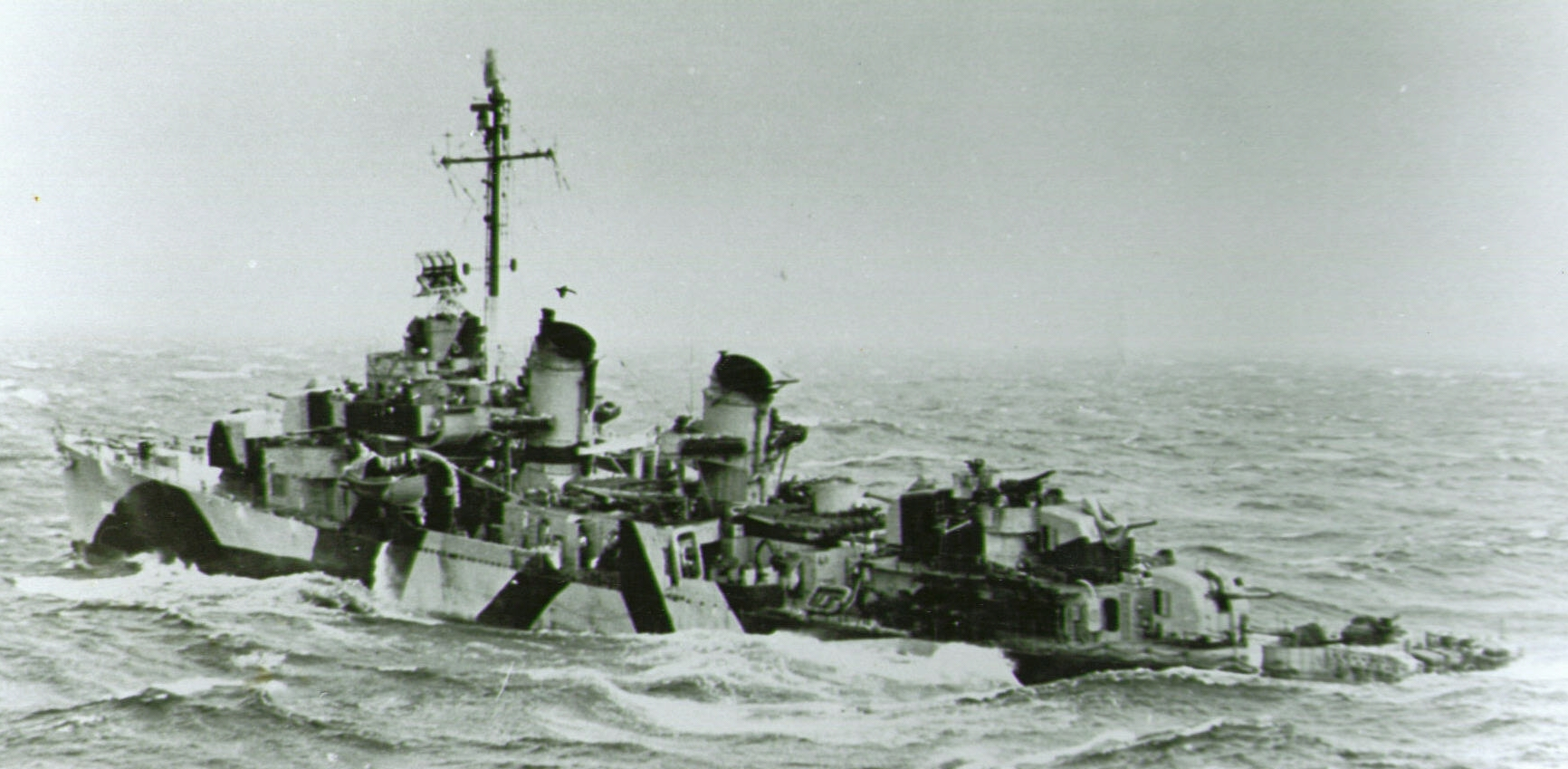
Another view of Bennion at sea

Bennion received the Presidential Unit Citation for her actions off Okinawa (1 April – 1 June 1945), and eight battle stars.
