= Japanese aircraft carrier Ryūhō =

Light aircraft carrier of the Imperial Japanese Navy

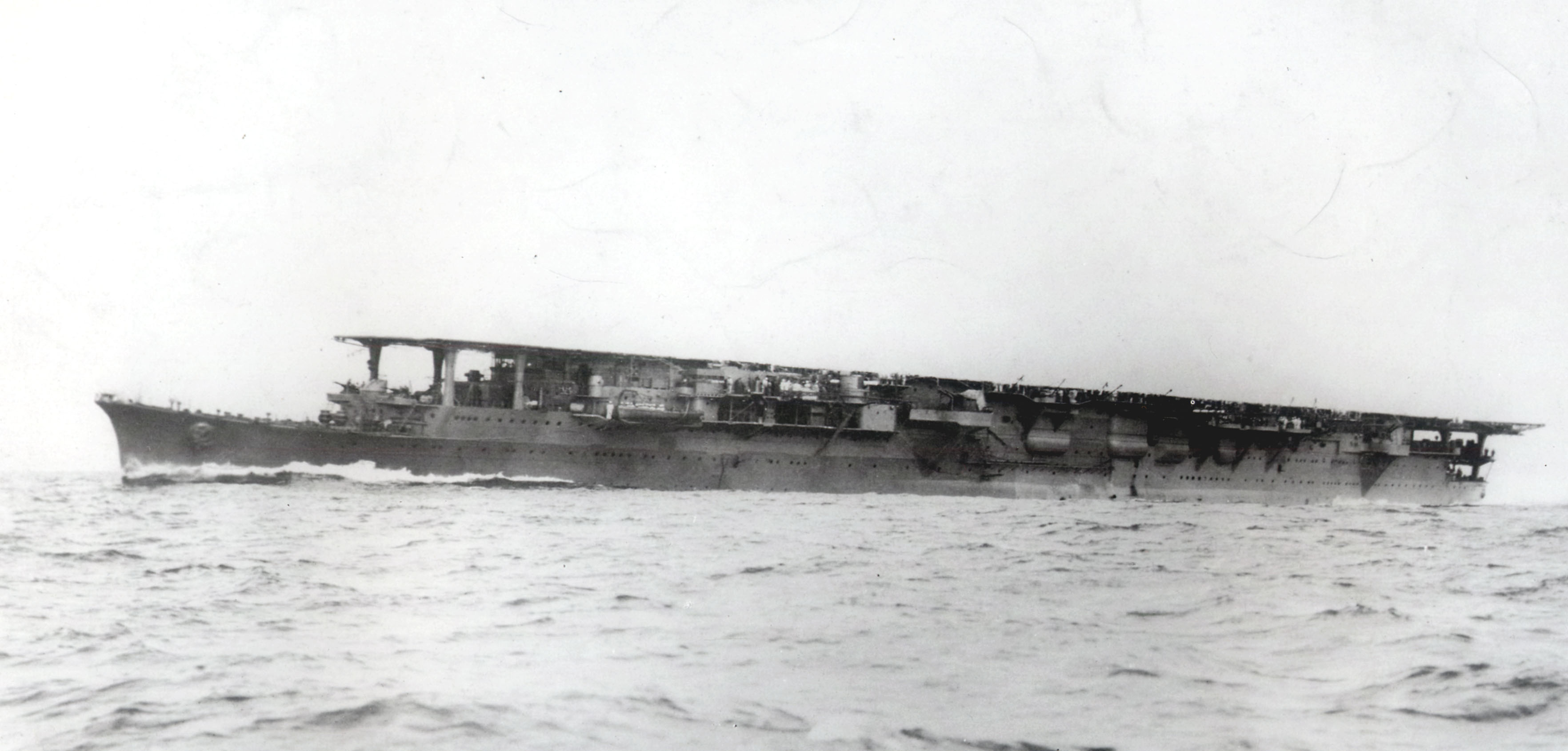
- Ryūhō in 1942

History

Empire of Japan
- Name: Taigei
- Operator: Imperial Japanese Navy
- Builder: Yokosuka Naval Arsenal
- Laid down: 12 April 1933
- Launched: 16 November 1933
- Completed: 31 March 1934
- Out of service: 12 December 1941
- Renamed: 30 November 1942
- Fate: Converted into a light aircraft carrier
- Name: Ryūhō
- Namesake: Japanese for Dragon Phoenix
- Recommissioned: 30 November 1942
- Stricken: 30 November 1945
- Fate: Scrapped, 1946

General characteristics
- Type: Light aircraft carrier
- Displacement: 16,700 t (16,400 long tons) (standard displacement)
- Length: 215.65 m (707 ft 6 in) (o/a)
- Beam: 19.58 m (64 ft 3 in)
- Draft: 6.67 m (21 ft 11 in)
- Installed power: 4 Kampon water-tube boilers; 52,000 shp (39,000 kW)
- Propulsion: 2 shafts; 2 geared steam turbine sets
- Speed: 26.5 knots (49.1 km/h; 30.5 mph) (design)
- Range: 8,000 nmi (15,000 km; 9,200 mi) at 18 knots (33 km/h; 21 mph)
- Complement: 989
- Sensors & processing systems: 1 × Type 2, Mark 2, Model 1 air search radar
- Armament: (in 1942) 4 × twin 12.7 cm DP guns; 10 × triple 25 mm AA guns; 6 depth charges; (in 1945); 4 × twin 12.7 cm DP guns; 10 × triple, 4 × twin, 23 × single 25 mm AA guns; 6 × single 13 mm AA guns; 6 depth charges; 6 × 12 cm rocket launchers
- Aircraft carried: 31–36

Ryūhō (龍鳳; "Dragon Phoenix") was a light aircraft carrier of the Imperial Japanese Navy. She was converted from the submarine tender Taigei (大鯨; "Big Whale"), which had been used in the Second Sino-Japanese War. One of the least successful of the light aircraft carrier conversions due to her small size, slow speed and weak construction, during World War II, Ryūhō was used primarily as an aircraft transport and for training purposes, although she was also involved in a number of combat missions, including the Battle of the Philippine Sea.

== Background ==
The London Naval Treaty imposed limitations on new construction of major capital warships for the major world powers. The Imperial Japanese Navy responded in part by the construction of auxiliary vessels, such as fleet oilers and submarine tenders, designed so that they could be converted quickly into aircraft carriers in time of conflict. Taigei was ordered as part of the 1st Naval Armaments Supplement Programme of 1932.

== Design ==
Although Taigei was designed from the onset for possible later conversion to an aircraft carrier, the design proved to have many shortcomings. The basic design of the hull suffered from a high freeboard with a shallow draught, which resulted in poor stability. Although extensive use of electric arc welding on the hull speeded construction time and was considered highly innovative for the time, lack of experience with this technique led to many weak welds, and the ship suffered from frequent cracks. Inadequate sectioning into waterproof compartments below her waterline, combined with the weak construction of her hull, also made the ship vulnerable in combat situations. The new vessel was also plagued by the poor performance of its diesel engines, which gave only half the output expected.

Conversion of Taigei into an aircraft carrier entailed adding a 185-by-23-metre (607 by 75 ft) flight deck. Two 13.6-by-12.0-metre (44.6 by 39.4 ft) elevators connected the flight deck to the hangar deck below. During the conversion, the problematic diesel engines were replaced by Kampon steam turbines of the same design as was used in the Kagero-class destroyer. While greatly improving on engine performance and reliability, the more powerful engines were not powerful enough to overcome the increased displacement and side bulges in the hull of the modified design, and speed was decreased by two knots. Her flight wing theoretically consisted of 31 aircraft, typically a mixture of Mitsubishi A6M "Zero" fighters, Aichi D3A "Val" and Yokosuka D4Y "Judy" dive bombers, and Nakajima B5N "Kate" torpedo bombers, but her small size limited her usefulness in combat operations. In August 1944, her flight deck was lengthened to 198.1 meters, but the number of aircraft embarked could only be increased to 36.

== Operational history ==
=== As the submarine tender Taigei ===
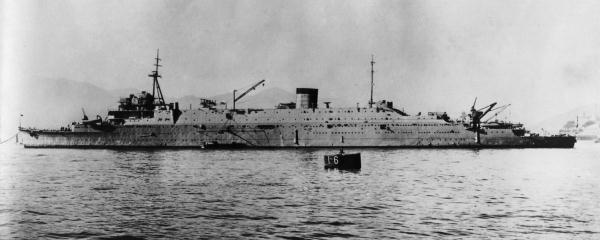
Japanese submarine depot ship Taigei off Kure in 1935

Taigei was laid down at Yokosuka Naval Arsenal on 12 April 1933, and was launched on 16 November 1933. Construction was rushed by plans to have Emperor Hirohito attend the launching ceremony and due to inexperience with the electric arc welding method, portions of the hull warped during construction. Immediately after the launching ceremony, Taigei was returned to the dry dock for repairs and modifications, which involved replacement of damaged sections by the traditional rivet construction method.

Formally commissioned on 31 March 1934, Taigei was soon damaged by a typhoon in what was later called the "Fourth Fleet Incident". Seawater ingression from faulty waterproof doors shorted the electric system, disabling her steering and the waves from the typhoon cracked a number of the welds in her hull. Further repairs at Yokosuka Naval Arsenal were scheduled for early 1936, but were delayed by the February 26 Incident. It was not until September 1938 that Taigei was deemed fully operational, and assigned to its design role as flagship of a submarine squadron.

From 1938 to 1940, Taigei performed normal operations in both northern and southern waters off Japan, with her primary mission being to support submarine operations off the coast of China from her home port of Kure in the Second Sino-Japanese War. She was reassigned from the 1st Fleet to the 6th Fleet on 15 November 1940 and was based at Kwajalein Atoll from 10 April 1941. Shortly before the start of hostilities in the Pacific War, Taigei was ordered back to Japan for conversion into a light aircraft carrier, arriving at Kure on 4 December.

The conversion work began on 20 December at Yokosuka Naval Arsenal, and was originally scheduled to be completed within three months; however, numerous problems and issues arose, and the conversion work was not completed until 30 November 1942. She gained the distinction of being the only major warship damaged in the Doolittle Raid on 18 April. She received one direct hit from a 500 lb (230 kg) bomb on the bow, plus several small incendiary bomb hits, with seven casualties among her crew. As an aircraft carrier, the vessel was renamed Ryūhō.

=== As the aircraft carrier Ryūhō ===
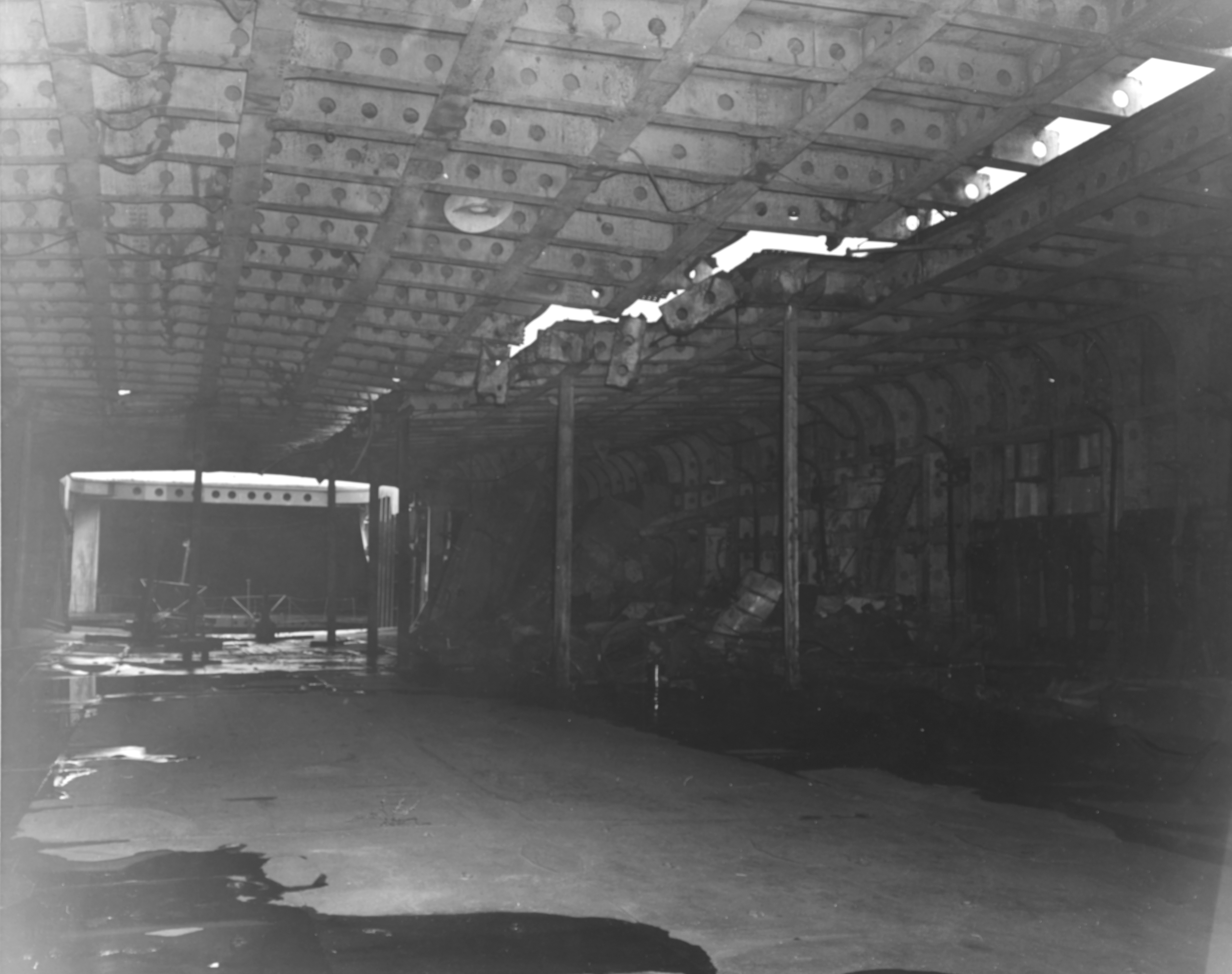
Hangar deck of Ryūhō, 9 October 1945

On 30 November 1942, with conversion and repairs complete, Ryūhō was officially assigned to the 3rd Fleet. On her first mission on 11 December, under the command of Captain Yoshio Kamei, she was sent to the Japanese naval base at Truk escorted by the destroyer Tokitsukaze. Her normal aircraft complement consisted of 15 Mitsubishi A6M "Zero" fighters and 16 Aichi D3A "Val" dive bombers, but for this mission, she was carrying 20 light bombers with their pilots and crews on a ferry mission. At 09:10 on 12 December, she was hit by a single torpedo on the starboard side from the American submarine USS Drum near Hachijojima, and was immediately forced to return to Yokosuka for emergency repairs, and remained out of operation until early 1943.

On 19 March Ryūhō began a series of uneventful aircraft ferry missions to occupied islands in the South Pacific. On 11 June, Ryūhō embarked the marooned survivors of the air group of Hiyō, which had been damaged by an American submarine. She was subsequently assigned to the Second Carrier Division of the 3rd Fleet, accompanying the escort carriers Unyō and Chūyō to Truk and back, and remaining based in the Seto Inland Sea for training missions.

In October, Ryūhō was sent on another aircraft ferry mission to Singapore, returning to Kure on 5 November. On 25 November, she departed with Hiyō and escorts on a long circular patrol and training mission, sailing to Manila, then to Singapore, then to Tarakan, then Palau, then Truk, then Saipan, and finally returning to Kure on 2 January 1944.

After two more uneventful patrol and training missions between Japan and the Marianas Islands, Ryūhō was sent to the Japanese anchorage at Tawi Tawi in May 1944 to join the Combined Fleet. From there, she sailed with the Combined Fleet to participate in the Battle of the Philippine Sea as part of "Force B" (with the carriers Hiyō, Junyō, the battleship Nagato, the cruiser Mogami, and eight destroyers). On 19 June, she launched an air strike against Task Force 58, but scored no hits; nearly all of Ryūhō's aircraft were shot down by the swarms of American F6F Hellcat fighters and the anti-aircraft guns of the American fleet. On 20 June, Ryūhō was attacked by four Grumman TBF Avenger torpedo bombers from the aircraft carrier USS Enterprise. She suffered only slight damage from near misses.

Ryūhō engaged in several more patrol and training missions near Japan. On 25 October, with the escort carrier Kaiyō, Ryūhō set sail from Sasebo Naval District on another aircraft ferry mission to Keelung, Formosa. They were escorted by the destroyers Momi, Ume and Momo. They returned to Kure on 2 November. From 7 to 15 November, Ryūhō briefly flew the flag of the Commander of the Mobile Fleet, Admiral Jisaburō Ozawa.

==== Final mission ====
Ryūhō photographed by US Navy aircraft at Kure in September 1945

On 31 December 1944, Ryūhō sailed for Formosa with a load of 58 Ohka kamikaze planes. Accompanying her were nine empty oil tankers bound for Singapore, and the destroyers Hamakaze, Isokaze, Yukikaze, Shigure and Hatakaze.

Upon reaching Formosa and unloading her cargo, Ryūhō was among the targets of a major series of American carrier-based air raids all over the island. Twelve TBF Avengers attacked her, but none scored a hit, and Ryūhō's gunners shot down one of them. Ryūhō departed for Japan on 2 January 1945 escorted by Isokaze; when she arrived at Kure on 18 January, Ryūhō also gained the distinction of being the last Japanese aircraft carrier to venture outside the home waters of Japan.

Ryūhō was attacked by Task Force 58 aircraft on 19 March near Kure, suffering hits by three 500 lb bombs and two 5.5-inch rockets. The damage was severe: the flight deck bulged upward between the two elevators, the No. 1 boiler was punctured by a bomb fragment, the stern settled two meters into the water, and a raging fire broke out. Twenty crewmen were killed and thirty were wounded. Upon returning to Kure on 1 April, Ryūhō was considered to be a total loss. Moored as an abandoned hulk off of Etajima, she was attacked by American aircraft again on 24 July and 28 July. She was struck from the navy list on 30 November 1945 and scrapped in 1946.
