= Japanese aircraft carrier Unryū =

Imperial Japanese Navy's Unryū-class aircraft carrier

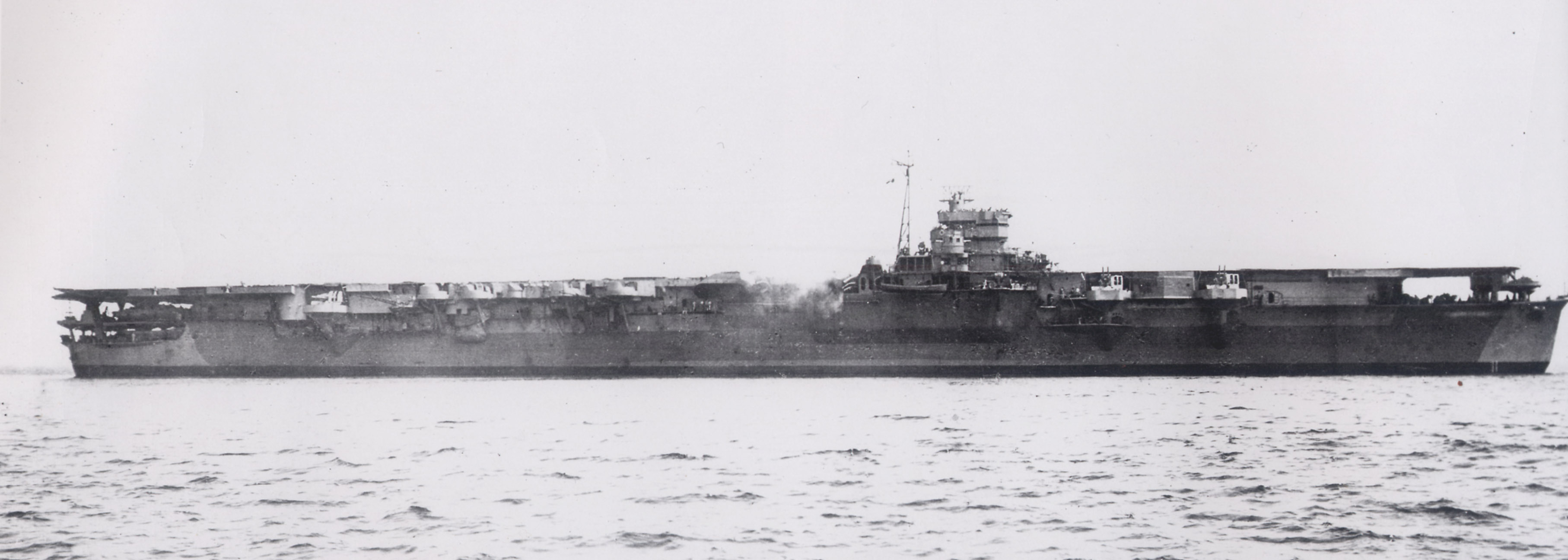
- Unryū departing Yokosuka, 16 July 1944

History

Empire of Japan
- Name: Unryū (雲龍)
- Namesake: Japanese meaning "Cloud Dragon"
- Ordered: 1941
- Builder: Yokosuka Naval Arsenal
- Laid down: 1 August 1942
- Launched: 25 September 1943
- Commissioned: 6 August 1944
- Fate: Sunk, 19 December 1944

General characteristics
- Class & type: Unryū-class aircraft carrier
- Displacement: 20,450 t (20,130 long tons)
- Length: 227.35 m (745 ft 11 in)
- Beam: 22 m (72 ft 2 in)
- Draft: 8.73 m (28 ft 8 in)
- Installed power: 8 Kampon water-tube boilers; 152,000 shp (113,000 kW)
- Propulsion: 4 shafts; 4 geared steam turbine sets
- Speed: 34 knots (63 km/h; 39 mph)
- Range: 8,000 nmi (15,000 km; 9,200 mi) at 18 knots (33 km/h; 21 mph)
- Complement: 1,595
- Sensors & processing systems: 2 × Type 2, Mark 2, Model 1 air search radars; 2 × Type 3, Mark 1, Model 3 air search radars; 1 × Type 93 sonar; 2 × Type 0 hydrophones
- Armament: 6 × twin 12.7 cm (5 in) DP guns; 16 × triple, 3 × single 25 mm (1 in) AA guns; 6 × 28-tube 12 cm (4.7 in) AA rocket launchers
- Armor: Belt: 46–140 mm (1.8–5.5 in); Deck: 25–56 mm (0.98–2.20 in)
- Aircraft carried: 48 (up to 65)

The Japanese aircraft carrier Unryū (雲龍, Cloud Dragon) was the lead ship of her class of fleet aircraft carriers built for the Imperial Japanese Navy (IJN) during World War II. She was commissioned in mid-1944, but fuel and aircrew shortages limited her use to Japanese waters. The impending American invasion of Luzon caused the IJN to order her to transport aircraft and supplies to the Philippines in December. The ship was torpedoed and sunk by the American submarine USS Redfish in the East China Sea during the voyage.

== Design and description ==
The last purpose-built Japanese carrier construction was a group of vessels based on an improved Hiryū design, but with individual units differing in detail reflecting the changing circumstances as the conflict in the Pacific approached its conclusion. Unryū was ordered, under the provisional name of #302, as part of the Rapid Naval Armaments Supplement Programme of 1941. The ship was one of 16 Unryū-class aircraft carriers planned, although only three were completed before the end of the war. (Note: Two of these ships were canceled to release a slipway and material to convert Shinano into an aircraft carrier.)

Unryū had a length of 227.35 meters (745 ft 11 in) overall. She had a beam of 22 meters (72 ft 2 in) and a draft of 8.73 meters (28 ft 8 in). She displaced 20,450 metric tons (20,130 long tons). Her crew consisted of 1,595 officers and men.

The ship used the same turbines and boilers as used in the heavy cruiser Suzuya. These consisted of four geared steam turbine sets with a total of 152,000 shaft horsepower (113,000 kW), each driving one shaft, using steam provided by eight Kampon Type B water-tube boilers. The ship had a designed speed of 34 knots (63 km/h; 39 mph). Unryū carried 3,670 metric tons (3,610 long tons) of fuel oil which gave her a range of 8,000 nautical miles (15,000 km; 9,200 mi) at 18 knots (33 km/h; 21 mph). She had two funnels on the starboard side, each angled below the horizontal. They were fitted with a water-cooling system to reduce the turbulence caused by hot exhaust gases.

=== Flight deck arrangements ===
Unryū's flight deck was 216.9 meters (711 ft 7 in) long and had a maximum width of 27 meters (88 ft 7 in). A small island was mounted well forward on the starboard side and contained the ship's bridge and air operations control center. It was fitted with a small tripod mast that mounted one of the ship's radar antennas. The ship was designed with two superimposed hangars that were served by two aircraft elevators, each 14 by 14 meters (46 by 46 ft); the center elevator as used in Hiryū was deleted to simplify construction and reduce stress in the hull. The elevators had a maximum capacity of 7,000 kilograms (15,000 lb) and took 19 seconds to go from the lower hangar to the flight deck. Unryū was fitted with hydraulically operated Type 3 arresting gear with nine cables. She also mounted three Type 3 crash barricades. No aircraft catapult was fitted. The ship mounted a retractable crane on the starboard side of the flight deck, just aft of the rear elevator. Unryū carried 397,340 liters (87,400 imp gal; 104,970 U.S. gal) of aviation gasoline for her aircraft.

The ship's air group was originally intended to consist of 12 Mitsubishi A6M Zero fighters, plus 3 in storage, 27 Aichi D3A "Val" dive bombers, plus 3 in reserve, and 18 Nakajima B5N "Kate" torpedo bombers plus 2 in crates. Unryū's hangars could not accommodate so many aircraft so 11 planes were planned to be permanently carried on the flight deck. In 1943 the air group was revised to consist of 18 Mitsubishi A7M "Sam" fighters (+2 in storage), 27 Yokosuka D4Y "Judy" dive bombers and 6 Nakajima C6N "Myrt" reconnaissance aircraft. Of these, the C6Ns were intended to be carried on the flight deck. When the ship was commissioned in 1944, neither the A7M nor the C6Ns were yet in service, so the air group was reconfigured to consist of 27 Zeros, 12 D4Ys, 3 of which were to be the reconnaissance version, and 9 Nakajima B6N "Jill" torpedo bombers. By this time, however, the shortage of carrier-qualified aircrew was such that they were ordered to operate from shore bases and Unryū never embarked her full air group.

=== Armor, armament and sensors ===
Unryū's waterline armored belt was 46 millimeters (1.8 in) thick over her machinery spaces, but this increased to 140 millimeters (5.5 in) over her magazines. Her deck armor above the machinery was 25 millimeters (0.98 in) thick, but the armor above the magazines was 56 millimeters (2.2 in) thick.

The ship's primary armament consisted of a dozen 40-caliber 12.7 cm (5 in) Type 89 anti-aircraft (AA) guns in twin mounts on sponsons on the ship's sides. Unryū was initially equipped with 16 triple 25 mm (1 in) Type 96 and 3 single Type 96 AA gun mounts, most on sponsons along the sides of the hull. These guns were supplemented by six 28-round AA rocket launchers. Shortly after completion, another 4 triple and 13 single 25 mm mounts were added. For defense against submarines, the carrier was fitted with six depth charge throwers and carried between six and ten depth charges for them. A Type 3 sonar and a Type 93 hydrophone were fitted to detect any submarines.

Two Type 94 high-angle fire-control directors, one on each side of the ship, were fitted to control the Type 89 guns. Each director mounted a 4.5-meter (14 ft 9 in) rangefinder. Six Type 95 directors controlled the 25 mm guns and the 12 cm rocket launchers. Early warning was provided by two Type 2, Mark 2, Model 1 search radars. One of these was mounted on the top of the island while the other retracted into the port side of the flight deck, between the two elevators. In addition, Unryū had two smaller Type 3, Mark 1, Model 3 early-warning radars, one mounted on the tripod mast on the island and the other on the starboard aft retractable radio mast.

== Construction and career ==
Unryū was laid down at Yokosuka Naval Arsenal on 1 August 1942 and launched on 25 September 1943. Upon commissioning on 6 August 1944, she was assigned to the 3rd Fleet. She underwent shakedown and trials within Tokyo Bay through mid-September, and was then transferred to Kure Naval District, from which she made numerous training runs around the Seto Inland Sea until December. From 30 October to 7 November, she served briefly as the flagship of Vice Admiral Jisaburo Ozawa’s Mobile Fleet. Eight days later, the Mobile Fleet was disbanded and the ship was transferred to 1st Carrier Division. Later that month, some A6Ms and B6Ns were embarked.

=== Final voyage ===
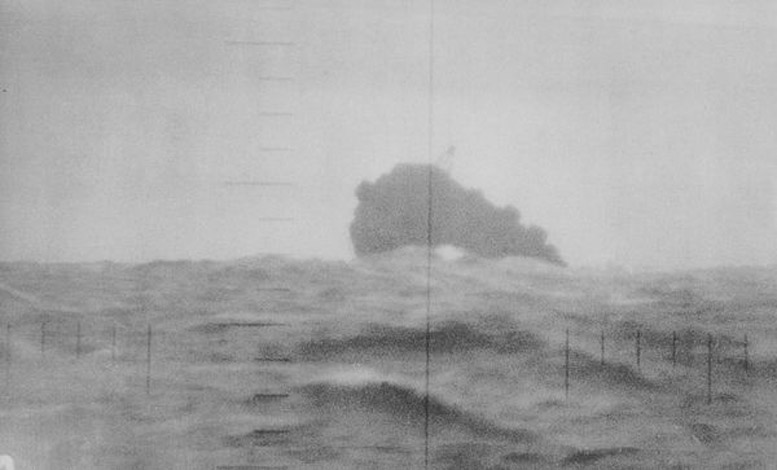
Unryū sinking, December 19, 1944. Photo taken through the periscope of Redfish.

On 13 December 1944, thirty Yokosuka MXY7 Ōhka kamikaze rocket planes were loaded aboard Unryū for transport to Manila in the Philippines. Four days later, on 17 December 1944, Unryū departed Kure, Hiroshima escorted by the destroyers Shigure, Hinoki, and Momi under the overall command of Captain Konishi. Her maiden sea voyage was a vain attempt to reinforce the garrison on the island of Luzon just prior to the Allied landings there.

On 19 December 1944, Unryū was torpedoed and sunk by the submarine USS Redfish. Redfish fired four torpedoes, one of which hit directly under the carrier's bridge on the starboard side at 16:35. The hit stopped the vessel dead in the water as it severed the main steam line, flooded two boiler rooms, started several fires and gave the ship a 3-degree list. Just as the carrier began to get underway, another torpedo struck at 16:50 on the starboard side abreast the forward elevator and the highly volatile forward aviation gasoline tanks. The resulting explosion caused the warheads of the Ohka kamikaze planes stored on the lower hangar deck to detonate and essentially blew the bow off the ship. The ship listed to 30 degrees very quickly and the order to abandon ship was given. With a 90-degree list, the ship sank bow-first to the bed of the East China Sea in just seven minutes at position 29°59′N 124°03′E. Casualties were very heavy with 1,238 officers, crewmen and passengers losing their lives. Only 145 men survived to be rescued by Shigure, which returned to Sasebo on 22 December. Unryū was struck from the Navy List on 20 February 1945.

== See also ==
- List by death toll of ships sunk by submarines
- List of the largest artificial non-nuclear explosions

== Bibliography ==
- Jentschura, Hansgeorg; Jung, Dieter & Mickel, Peter (1977). Warships of the Imperial Japanese Navy, 1869–1945. Annapolis, Maryland: United States Naval Institute. ISBN 0-87021-893-X.
- Lengerer, Hans (2010a). Illustrated Record of the Transition of the Superstructures of BB Kongô Class: Introduction to CV Unryû Class. Katowice, Poland: Model Hobby. ISBN 978-83-60041-42-0.
- Lengerer, Hans (2010b). "Katsuragi and the Failure of Mass Production of Medium Sized Aircraft Carriers". In Jordan, John (ed.). Warship 2010. London: Conway. pp. 103–21. ISBN 978-1-84486-110-1.
- Silverstone, Paul H. (1984). Directory of the World's Capital Ships. New York: Hippocrene Books. ISBN 0-88254-979-0.
- Stille, Mark (2005). Imperial Japanese Navy Aircraft Carriers 1921–1945. New Vanguard. Vol. 109. Oxford, UK: Osprey Publishing. ISBN 1-84176-853-7.
- Sturton, Ian (1980). "Japan". In Chesneau, Roger (ed.). Conway's All the World's Fighting Ships 1922–1946. Greenwich, UK: Conway Maritime Press. ISBN 0-85177-146-7.
- Warships of the Imperial Japanese Navy: Shokaku Class, Soryu, Hiryu, Unryu Class, Taiho (PDF). Kojinsha. Vol. 6.
- Tully, Anthony P. (1998). "IJN Unryu: Tabular Record of Movement". Kido Butai. Combinedfleet.com.
- Tully, Anthony P. (1998). "STAR-CROSSED SORTIE: The Last Voyage Of UNRYU and DesDiv 52". MYSTERIES/UNTOLD SAGAS OF THE IMPERIAL JAPANESE NAVY. Combinedfleet.com.
