= HMAS Gascoyne (K354) =

1943 River-class frigate

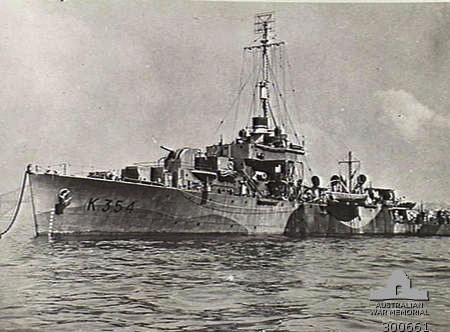
- Gascoyne c. 1943

History

Australia
- Name: Gascoyne
- Namesake: Gascoyne River
- Builder: Mort's Dock & Engineering Company, Sydney
- Laid down: 3 July 1942
- Launched: 20 February 1943
- Commissioned: 18 November 1943
- Decommissioned: 12 April 1946
- Recommissioned: 8 June 1959
- Decommissioned: 1 February 1966
- Reclassified: Oceanographic Research Ship
- Motto: "Return to the Sea"
- Honours and awards: Battle honours: New Guinea 1944; Leyte Gulf 1944; Lingayen Gulf 1945; Borneo 1945; Pacific 1945
- Fate: Sold for scrap in 1972
- Badge

General characteristics
- Class & type: River-class frigate
- Displacement: 1,489 tons (standard), 2,120 tons (full load)
- Length: 301 ft 6 in (91.90 m)
- Beam: 36 ft 7.75 in (11.1697 m)
- Draught: 12 ft (3.7 m)
- Propulsion: Triple expansion, 2 shafts. 5,500 horsepower (4,100 kW)
- Speed: 20 knots (37 km/h; 23 mph)
- Complement: 140
- Armament: 2 × 4-inch guns; 2 × 40 mm Bofors; 6 × 20 mm Oerlikons; 1 × Hedgehog, depth charge throwers

HMAS Gascoyne (K354/F354/A276) was a River-class frigate that served in the Royal Australian Navy (RAN). Laid down in 1942 and commissioned in 1943, the frigate served during World War II, before being placed in reserve in 1946. Reactivated in 1959, Gascoyne was reclassified as a survey and research ship, a role she fulfilled until she was decommissioned again in 1966, and sold for scrap in 1972.

== Construction ==
Gascoyne was laid down by Mort's Dock & Engineering Company, Sydney on 3 July 1942. She was launched on 20 February 1943 by Lady Wakehurst, wife of the Governor of New South Wales, and commissioned into the RAN on 18 November 1943. The ship was named after the Gascoyne River.

== Operational history ==
Gascoyne was present in Tokyo Bay on Victory over Japan Day (2 September 1945), when the Japanese Instrument of Surrender was signed.

The frigate received five battle honours for her wartime service: "New Guinea 1944", "Leyte Gulf 1944", "Lingayen Gulf 1945", "Borneo 1945", and "Pacific 1945".

Gascoyne paid off into reserve on 12 April 1946, but recommissioned at Sydney on 8 June 1959 for survey and oceanographic research duty. She was equipped with a deep water mechanical bathythermograph instrument.

== Decommissioning and fate ==
Gascoyne paid off again on 1 February 1966, and was sold for scrap to the Fujita Salvage Company Limited of Osaka in Japan on 15 February 1972. The bathythermograph was transferred to HMAS Sprightly. Gascoyne left Melbourne under tow for Japan on 6 July 1972.
