= San Isidro, Leyte =

Municipality in Leyte, Philippines

San Isidro Punong San Isidro de Campo
- Municipality
- Municipality of San Isidro
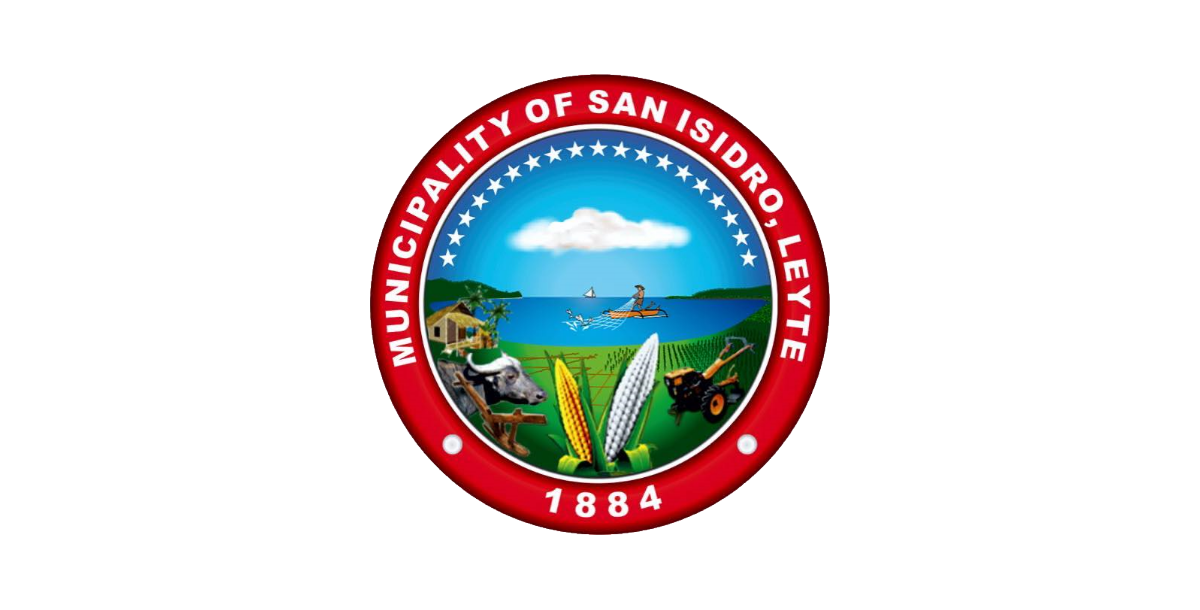
- Flag
- Etymology: San Isidro Labrador
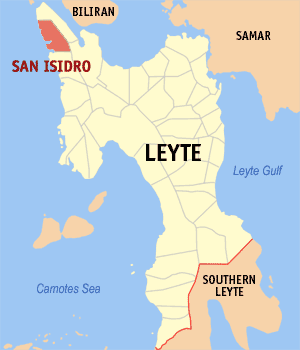
- Map of Leyte with San Isidro highlighted
- Interactive map of San Isidro
- Location within the Philippines
- Coordinates: 11°25′N 124°21′E
- Country: Philippines
- Region: Eastern Visayas
- Province: Leyte
- District: 3rd district
- Named for: San Isidro Labrador
- Barangays: 19 (see Barangays)

Government
  - Type: Sangguniang Bayan
  - Mayor: Remedio B. Veloso
  - Vice Mayor: Cecilio C. Ecalla
  - Representative: Anna Victoria V. Tuazon
  - Councilors: List: • Carmichael L. Villarino; • Tata Lumapak; • Hospicio B. Apacible; • Rolando C. Piamonte; • Cecilia L. Cabahug; • Ailene Basilan; • Dante Rodaje; • Dit-Dit Enriquez; DILG Masterlist of Officials
  - Electorate: 22,867 voters (2025)

Area
  - Total: 122.50 km^{2} (47.30 sq mi)
- Elevation: 34 m (112 ft)
- Highest elevation: 1,016 m (3,333 ft)
- Lowest elevation: 0 m (0 ft)

Population (2024 census)
  - Total: 30,792
  - Density: 251.36/km^{2} (651.03/sq mi)
  - Households: 8,272
- Demonym: San Isidrohanon

Economy
  - Income class: 3rd municipal income class
  - Poverty incidence: 32.51% (2023)
  - Revenue: ₱ 170.7 million (2024)
  - Assets: ₱ 497.9 million (2024)
  - Expenditure: ₱ 222.7 million (2024)
  - Liabilities: ₱ 165.2 million (2024)

Service provider
  - Electricity: Leyte 5 Electric Cooperative (LEYECO 5)
  - Water: SIKAT
- Time zone: UTC+8 (PST)
- ZIP code: 6535
- PSGC: 0803742000
- IDD : area code: +63 (0)53
- Native languages: Cebuano; Tagalog
- Major religions: Roman Catholicism
- Feast date: May 15
- Catholic diocese: Diocese of Naval
- Vicariate: Vicariate of Calubian
- Patron Saint: San Isidro Labrador
- Parish Priest: Msgr. Vinencio L. Sosing Jr.
- Parochial Vicar: Rev. Fr. Jake E. Domingo

San Isidro, officially the Municipality of San Isidro (Cebuano: Lungsod sa San Isidro; Waray: Bungto han San Isidro; Tagalog: Bayan ng San Isidro), is a municipality in the province of Leyte, Philippines. According to the 2024 census, it has a population of 30,792 people.

== History ==
The Battle of Leyte Gulf during the Second World War is considered by most historians as the biggest naval battle in history. The scope of the encounter in terms of warships, warplanes, and manpower involved is nothing short of astounding. The casualties borne by both warring parties are incomparable to other similar engagements, to say the least. It was, by all standards, a decisive victory for the American naval forces and could easily have turned the tide in favor of the Japanese Imperial Navy had the result been otherwise.

The battle was waged in an attempt by the Japanese to thwart General Douglas MacArthur's bold return via the Leyte Landings on October 20, 1944, the second biggest amphibious invasion in modern history after the Normandy Invasion less than five months earlier. The Japanese naval forces organized three attack forces with the American landing armada in the Leyte Gulf as target. The largest attack group, organized hastily by the Japanese, was the Central Force headed by Admiral Kurita. This powerful force encountered a token fleet of American escort ships in the Philippine Sea off the island of Samar. Despite overwhelming superiority, the Japanese Central Force surprisingly retreated through the San Bernardino Strait. Part of the remnants of the Central Force was pursued and destroyed by American warplanes.

There are six sunken Japanese warships in San Isidro Bay, northwest of Leyte Island. The warships were destroyed on or about the same period when the Battle for Leyte Gulf was waged. This paper will attempt to establish the circumstances that led to the sinking and destruction of these ships. It will try to find out if the ill-fated vessels were among the remnants of the Japanese Central Force which retreated after almost bringing the Leyte Landings of the Allied Forces to their doom.

The Battle for Leyte Gulf was the most savage naval engagement of World War II.

== Geography ==
=== Barangays ===
San Isidro is politically subdivided into 19 barangays. Each barangay consists of puroks and some have sitios.

- Banat-i
- Basud
- Bawod (Poblacion)
- Biasong
- Bunacan
- Busay
- Cabungaan
- Capiñahan (Poblacion)
- Crossing (Poblacion)
- Daja-daku
- Daja-diot
- Hda. Maria
- Linao
- Matungao
- Paril
- San Miguel
- San Jose
- Taglawigan
- Tinago

=== Climate ===
Climate data for San Isidro, Leyte
Month	Jan	Feb	Mar	Apr	May	Jun	Jul	Aug	Sep	Oct	Nov	Dec	Year
Mean daily maximum °C (°F)	28 (82)	29 (84)	29 (84)	31 (88)	31 (88)	30 (86)	30 (86)	30 (86)	30 (86)	29 (84)	29 (84)	29 (84)	30 (85)
Mean daily minimum °C (°F)	22 (72)	22 (72)	22 (72)	23 (73)	24 (75)	25 (77)	25 (77)	25 (77)	25 (77)	24 (75)	24 (75)	23 (73)	24 (75)
Average precipitation mm (inches)	73 (2.9)	56 (2.2)	75 (3.0)	71 (2.8)	114 (4.5)	174 (6.9)	172 (6.8)	163 (6.4)	167 (6.6)	161 (6.3)	158 (6.2)	125 (4.9)	1,509 (59.5)
Average rainy days	15.2	12.5	16.2	17.3	23.9	27.3	28.4	26.9	26.9	27.1	23.8	19.3	264.8
Source: Meteoblue

== Demographics ==
Population census of San Isidro

Year	Pop.	±% p.a.
1903	4,665	—
1918	13,059	+7.10%
1939	30,063	+4.05%
1948	31,243	+0.43%
1960	25,017	−1.83%
1970	23,569	−0.59%
1975	23,926	+0.30%
1980	22,285	−1.41%

Year	Pop.	±% p.a.
1990	24,442	+0.93%
1995	33,204	+5.91%
2000	29,410	−2.57%
2007	29,655	+0.11%
2010	28,554	−1.37%
2015	31,641	+1.97%
2020	30,722	−0.62%
2024	30,792	+0.05%

Source: Philippine Statistics Authority

In the 2024 census, the population of San Isidro was 30,792 people, with a density of 250 inhabitants per square kilometre or 650 inhabitants per square mile.

== Economy ==
Poverty incidence of San Isidro (%)

Source: Philippine Statistics Authority

== Local Government ==
2025-2028 San Isidro, Leyte Officials
Position	Name	Party
Mayor	Remedio B. Veloso	PFP
Vice Mayor	Carmichael L. Villarino	PFP
Councilors	Cecilio D. Ecalla	PFP
Councilors	Rolando C. Piamonte Sr.	PFP
Councilors	Ailene L. Basilan	PFP
Councilors	Jerold T. Lumapak	PFP
Councilors	Glenn D. Velasco	PFP
Councilors	Wildegardo S. Enriquez	PFP
Councilors	Concepcion B. Pacampara	PFP
Councilors	Dante R. Rodaje	Promdi
Ex Officio Municipal Council Members
ABC President	TBD	Nonpartisan
SK Federation President	TBD	Nonpartisan
