= USS Redfish (SS-395) =

Submarine of the United States

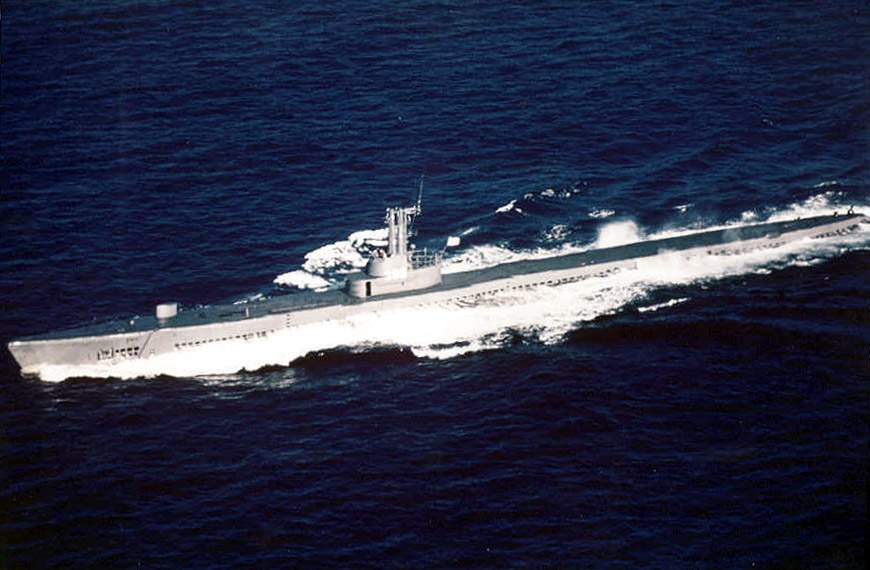

History

United States
- Builder: Portsmouth Naval Shipyard, Kittery, Maine
- Laid down: 9 September 1943
- Launched: 27 January 1944
- Commissioned: 12 April 1944
- Decommissioned: 27 June 1968
- Stricken: 30 June 1968
- Fate: Sunk as target, 6 February 1969

General characteristics
- Class & type: Balao-class diesel-electric submarine
- Displacement: 1,526 tons (1550 t) surfaced; 2,391 tons (2429 t) submerged
- Length: 311 ft 6 in (94.95 m)
- Beam: 27 ft 3 in (8.31 m)
- Draft: 16 ft 10 in (5.13 m) maximum
- Propulsion: 4 × Fairbanks-Morse Model 38D8-⅛ 10-cylinder opposed piston diesel engines driving electrical generators; 2 × 126-cell Sargo batteries; 4 × high-speed Elliott electric motors with reduction gears; two propellers; 5,400 shp (4.0 MW) surfaced; 2,740 shp (2.0 MW) submerged
- Speed: 20.25 knots (37 km/h) surfaced; 8.75 knots (16 km/h) submerged
- Range: 11,000 nm (20,000 km) surfaced at 10 knots (19 km/h)
- Endurance: 48 hours at 2 knots (4 km/h) submerged; 75 days on patrol
- Test depth: 400 ft (120 m)
- Complement: 10 officers, 70–71 enlisted
- Armament: 10 × 21-inch (533 mm) torpedo tubes; 6 forward, 4 aft; 24 torpedoes; 1 × 5-inch (127 mm) / 25 caliber deck gun; Bofors 40 mm and Oerlikon 20 mm cannon

USS Redfish (SS/AGSS-395), a Balao-class submarine, was the first ship of the United States Navy to be named for the redfish. In addition to her naval career, which included sinking the Japanese aircraft carrier Unryū, she made several film appearances in the 1950s.

== Construction ==
Redfish's keel was laid down on 9 September 1943 at the Portsmouth Navy Yard of Kittery, Maine. She was launched on 27 January 1944 sponsored by Miss Ruth Roper, and commissioned on 12 April 1944.

== World War II ==
Redfish arrived at Pearl Harbor on 27 June 1944. Departing 23 July, she sank the 5,953-ton Japanese cargo ship Batopaha Maru on 25 August, the 7,311-ton tanker Ogura Maru Number Two on 16 September, and the 8,506-ton transport Mizuho Maru on 21 September, all off Formosa, before arriving at Midway Island on 2 October. Departing Midway on 25 October and Saipan on 3 November, she sank the 2,345 ton Japanese transport Hozan Maru during the night of 22 November – 23 November. Departing Saipan on 1 December, she combined with Sea Devil (SS-400) the night of 8 December – 9 December to heavily damage the Japanese aircraft carrier Junyō, putting it out of action for the remainder of the war.

Redfish sank the newly built 18,500-ton Japanese aircraft carrier Unryū, bound for Mindoro, on 19 December. After diving to 232 feet (71 m), she rose to the surface and raced to escape Japanese pursuit. Arriving at the Portsmouth Naval Shipyard for repairs on 17 February 1945, she returned to Pearl Harbor 23 July, and remained there until the end of the war.

Redfish received a Presidential Unit Citation, which read:

For extraordinary heroism in action during the First and Second War Patrols against enemy Japanese surface units in the restricted waters of the Pacific. Operating in bold defiance of foul weather and persistent hostile depth charging, gunfire and bombing by outnumbering forces of radar-equipped ships, air escorts and patrol craft, the Redfish launched her accurate and intensive gun and torpedo fire during brief periods of concentrated attack to sink a new Japanese aircraft carrier with her entire complement of embarked planes and equipment destined to be used against our forces, to damage severely another vital carrier and to destroy or cripple much additional shipping necessary to the enemy’s continued prosecution of the war. Although forced to the bottom in 230 feet of water by vicious countermeasures, with her pressure hull cracked and numerous leaks throughout, the Redfish responded gallantly to the superb handling of her skilled and aggressive ship's company and succeeded in evading further damage and returning to port. Her brilliant record of success in combat and her indomitable fighting spirit in the face of the most determined and fierce counterattacks by an alert and relentless enemy reflect the highest credit upon the Redfish, her valiant officers and men and the United States Naval Service.

== Post War service and movie career ==
After duty at Guam from September 1945 to January 1946, she arrived at San Diego, California, on 30 January. Departing on 3 March 1947, she voyaged to Guam and Japan before returning 21 June. After operations off the United States West Coast and Hawaii, she sailed toward Korea on 2 February 1951, and operated out of Yokosuka, Japan, until 24 June, in support of United Nations forces. Returning to San Diego on 3 July, she operated off the West Coast.

In August 1952, Redfish attempted to reach the North Pole by travelling through and under the Arctic ice. Redfish was accompanied by the icebreaker USCGC Burton Island for parts of the mission. When transiting under the ice, Redfish had to rely on its sonar to locate polynyas where the submarine could surface and recharge her batteries. The submarine did not reach the North Pole, although scientists on board were able to collect water samples. It would not be until nearly 6 years later that the American submarine USS Nautilus (SSN-571) would successfully reach the North Pole under the Arctic ice.

In the spring of 1954, fitted with a "dummy" rear fin, Redfish played the part of Jules Verne's Nautilus in the Walt Disney film 20,000 Leagues Under the Sea where the afterdeck of the Nautilus was constructed on the deck of the Redfish for a scene where the captain puts visitors out on the deck while the boat submerges. In September 1957, with deck and armament modifications, she played the part of the fictional submarine USS Nerka in the 1958 motion picture Run Silent, Run Deep.

Reclassified AGSS-395 on 1 July 1960, she was underway from San Diego, California, on western Pacific deployment from 26 March to 26 September. From then into 1968, she made annual training cruises to the western Pacific. Decommissioned on 27 June 1968 at San Diego, she was struck from the Naval Vessel Register 30 June, and sunk as a target off San Diego by the submarine USS Medregal (AGSS-480) on 6 February 1969.

Although not appearing on screen, the USS Redfish has a minor role in the 2023 movie Godzilla Minus One, where it pursued Godzilla following its mutation during Operation Crossroads, only to be incapacitated and partially sunk when one of its torpedoes malfunctioned and carried out a circular run. Diagrams of the USS Tang (SS-306) are used to represent the damage supposedly dealt in the accident.

== Honors and awards ==
Redfish received two battle stars for World War II service.
