= List of ship launches in 1938 =

The list of ship launches in 1938 includes a chronological list of some ships launched in 1938.

Date	Ship	Class	Builder	Location	Country	Notes
22 January	Rose	Cargo ship	Öresundsvarvet	Landskrona	Sweden	For Hvalfangerselskapet Kosmos A/S
14 February	Maury	Gridley-class destroyer	Bethlehem Shipbuilding	San Francisco	United States	
February	Citizen No. 1	Tank barge	Alabama Drydock and Shipbuilding Company	Mobile, Alabama	United States	For Citizens Oil Co.
3 March	Lochavon	Cargo ship	Harland & Wolff	Belfast	United Kingdom	For Royal Mail Line.
13 March	Phoenix	Brooklyn-class cruiser	New York Shipbuilding Corporation	Camden, New Jersey	United States	
14 March	Barbican	Bar-class boom defence vessel	Blyth Dry Docks & Shipbuilding Co. Ltd.	Blyth, Northumberland	United Kingdom	For Royal Navy.
16 March	Santa Cruz	Cargo ship	Deutsche Werft	Hamburg	Germany	For Oldenburg Portuguese Line.
17 March	Belfast	Town-class cruiser	Harland & Wolff	Belfast	United Kingdom	For Royal Navy.
19 March	Chikuma	Tone-class cruiser	Mitsubishi	Nagasaki	Japan	For Imperial Japanese Navy.
15 April	St. Louis	St. Louis-class cruiser	Newport News Shipbuilding & Dry Dock Company	Newport News, Virginia	United States	
16 April	Benham	Benham-class destroyer	Federal Shipbuilding	Kearny, New Jersey	United States	
28 April	Donax	Tanker	Harland & Wolff	Belfast	United Kingdom	For Anglo Saxon Petroleum Co.
5 May	Rowan	Benham-class destroyer	Norfolk Navy Yard	Norfolk, Virginia	United States	
5 May	Stack	Benham-class destroyer	Norfolk Navy Yard	Norfolk, Virginia	United States	
14 May	Mayrant	Benham-class destroyer	Boston Navy Yard	Boston, Massachusetts	United States	
14 May	Trippe	Benham-class destroyer	Boston Navy Yard	Boston, Massachusetts	United States	
16 May	Mizuho	Seaplane carrier	Kawasaki	Kobe	Japan	
28 May	Barbrook	Bar-class boom defence vessel	Blyth Dry Docks & Shipbuilding Co. Ltd.	Blyth, Northumberland	United Kingdom	For Royal Navy.
31 May	Egret	Egret-class sloop	J. Samuel White	Cowes	United Kingdom	For Royal Navy.
31 May	Waimarama	Cargo ship	Harland & Wolff	Belfast	United Kingdom	For Shaw Savill Line.
11 June	Ellet	Benham-class destroyer	Federal Shipbuilding	Kearny, New Jersey	United States	
14 June	Durban Castle	Passenger ship	Harland & Wolff	Belfast	United Kingdom	For Union-Castle Line.
15 June	Karl Galster	Type 1936-class destroyer	DeSchiMAG	Bremen	Germany	
28 June	Dromus	Tanker	Harland & Wolff	Belfast	United Kingdom	For Anglo Saxon Petroleum Co.
28 June	Shiranui	Kagerō-class destroyer	Uraga Dock Company	Uraga	Japan	For Imperial Japanese Navy.
29 June	Glenearn	Cargo ship	Caledon Shipbuilding & Engineering Co. Ltd.	Dundee	United Kingdom	For Blue Funnel Line.
29 June	Robert Middleton	Icemaid type collier	Grangemouth Dockyard Co. Ltd.	Grangemouth	United Kingdom	For Ministry of War Transport. Completed as a Dundas-class coastal stores carrier for the Royal Fleet Auxiliary.
30 June	Auckland	Egret-class sloop	Denny	Dumbarton	United Kingdom	For Royal Navy.
7 July	Gyller	Sleipner-class destroyer	Royal Norwegian Navy Shipyard	Horten	Norway	
17 July	Bembridge	Pilot cutter	Smiths Dock Company	South Bank-on-Tees, Middlesbrough	United Kingdom	For Trinity House.
27 July	Dominion Monarch	Cargo liner	Swan Hunter & Wigham Richardson	Wallsend, England	United Kingdom	For Shaw, Savill & Albion Line
28 July	Mauretania	Ocean liner	Cammell Laird	Birkenhead, England	United Kingdom	For Cunard Line
28 July	Rhind	Benham-class destroyer	Philadelphia Naval Shipyard	Philadelphia	United States	
July	Todd Johnson 17	Tank barge	Alabama Drydock and Shipbuilding Company	Mobile, Alabama	United States	For Todd Johnson Drydocks Inc.
July	4 unnamed vessels	Tank barges	Alabama Drydock and Shipbuilding Company	Mobile, Alabama	United States	For Southern Kraft Corporation.
22 August	Prinz Eugen	Modified Admiral Hipper-class cruiser	Germaniawerft	Kiel	Germany	
23 August	Barcastle	Bar-class boom defence vessel	Blyth Dry Docks & Shipbuilding Co. Ltd.	Blyth, Northumberland	United Kingdom	For Royal Navy.
25 August	British Fidelity	Tanker	Harland & Wolff	Belfast	United Kingdom	For British Tanker Company.
28 August	Wilhelm Heidkamp	Type 1936-class destroyer	DeSchiMAG	Bremen	Germany	
28 August	Lang	Benham-class destroyer	Federal Shipbuilding	Kearny, New Jersey	United States	
August	J.H.C. No. 4	Tank barge	Alabama Drydock and Shipbuilding Company	Mobile, Alabama	United States	For J. H. Coppedge.
date	unnamed	Steamship	Alabama Drydock and Shipbuilding Company	Mobile, Alabama	United States	
August	2 unnamed vessels	Tank barges	Alabama Drydock and Shipbuilding Company	Mobile, Alabama	United States	For Southern Kraft Corporation.
1 September	Dr. Heinrich Wiegand	Cargo ship	Nylands Verksted	Copenhagen	Denmark	For Argo Line.
9 September	Jervis	J-class destroyer	Hawthorn Leslie and Company	Hebburn-on-Tyne	United Kingdom	
12 September	Pelican	Egret-class sloop	Thornycroft	Woolston	United Kingdom	For Royal Navy.
15 September	Steiermark	Cargo ship	Germaniawerft	Kiel	Germany	For Hamburg America Line.
20 September	Anton Schmitt	Type 1936-class destroyer	DeSchiMAG	Bremen	Germany	
22 September	Mircea	Gorch Fock-class barque	Blohm + Voss	Hamburg	Germany	For Romanian Navy
24 September	Sisu	Icebreaker	Wärtsilä Hietalahti Shipyard	Helsinki	Finland	For Finnish Board of Navigation
26 September	Jersey	J-class destroyer	J. Samuel White	Cowes	United Kingdom	
27 September	Queen Elizabeth	Ocean liner	John Brown & Company	Clydebank, Scotland	United Kingdom	For Cunard Line
27 September	Kagerō	Kagerō-class destroyer	Maizuru Naval Arsenal	Maizuru	Japan	
29 September	Jan Mayen	Fishing trawler	Deschimag Seebeckwerft	Wesermünde	Germany	For Norddeutsche Hochseefischerei AG
September	Weser	Fishing trawler	Deschimag Seebeckwerft	Wesermünde	Germany	For Hanseatische Hochseefischerei AG
11 October	Janus	J-class destroyer	Swan Hunter & Wigham Richardson	Wallsend	United Kingdom	
11 October	San Demetrio	Tanker	Blythwood Shipbuilding Co. Ltd.	Glasgow	United Kingdom	For Eagle Oil & Shipping Co. Ltd.
12 October	Pretoria Castle	Passenger ship	Harland & Wolff	Belfast	United Kingdom	For Union-Castle Line.
25 October	Cairndale	Tanker	Harland & Wolff	Belfast	United Kingdom	For Royal Fleet Auxiliary.
25 October	Jackal	J-class destroyer	John Brown & Company	Clydebank	United Kingdom	
25 October	Kelly	K-class destroyer	Hawthorn Leslie and Company	Hebburn-on-Tyne	United Kingdom	
25 October	Kuroshio	Kagerō-class destroyer	Fujinagata Shipyard	Osaka	Japan	For Imperial Japanese Navy.
27 October	Jupiter	J-class destroyer	Yarrow & Company	Scotstoun	United Kingdom	
27 October	Sterett	Benham-class destroyer	Charleston Naval Shipyard	North Charleston, South Carolina	United States	
October	Neidenfels	Cargo liner	Deutsche Schiff- und Maschinenbau AG	Bremen	Germany	For Deutsche Dampfschiffahrts-Gesellschaft "Hansa"
8 November	Bayonet	Net-class boom defence vessel	Blyth Dry Docks & Shipbuilding Co. Ltd	Blyth, Northumberland	United Kingdom	For Royal Navy.
8 November	Richmond Castle	Refrigerated cargo ship	Harland & Wolff	Belfast	United Kingdom	For Union-Castle Line.
22 November	Jaguar	J-class destroyer	William Denny & Brothers	Dumbarton	United Kingdom	
29 November	Oyashio	Kagerō-class destroyer	Maizuru Naval Arsenal	Maizuru	Japan	For Imperial Japanese Navy.
5 December	Falconet	Net-class boom defence vessel	Blyth Dry Docks & Shipbuilding Co. Ltd	Blyth, Northumberland	United Kingdom	For Royal Navy.
8 December	Graf Zeppelin	Graf Zeppelin-class aircraft carrier	Deutsche Werke	Kiel	Germany	
8 December	Juno	J-class destroyer	Fairfield Shipbuilding & Engineering Company	Govan	United Kingdom	
8 December	Kuroshio Maru	Kawasaki-type oiler	Harima Zōsen KK	Aioi, Harima	Japan	For Chigai Kisen KK
8 December	Rowallan Castle	Refrigerated cargo ship	Harland & Wolff	Belfast	United Kingdom	For Union-Castle Line.
20 December	San Emiliano	Tanker	Harland & Wolff	Belfast	United Kingdom	For Eagle Oil and Shipping Company.
21 December	Javelin	J-class destroyer	John Brown & Company	Clydebank	United Kingdom	
December	B 5	Dredger	Alabama Drydock and Shipbuilding Company	Mobile, Alabama	United States	For Atlantic Dredging.
Unknown date	Adler	Cargo liner	Lübecker Maschinenbau Gesellschaft	Lübeck	Germany	For Argo Reederei Richard Adler & Co
Unknown date	Amrum	Coastal tanker	Danziger Werft AG	Danzig	(Free City of Danzig) Danzig	For Kriegsmarine.
Unknown date	Barcombe	Bar-class boom defence vessel	Goole Shipbuilding & Repairing Co. Ltd.	Goole	United Kingdom	For Royal Navy.
Unknown date	Barcroft	Bar-class boom defence vessel	Goole Shipbuilding & Repairing Co. Ltd.	Goole	United Kingdom	For Royal Navy.
Unknown date	B.H.M. Motor Ferry No. 4	Ferry	Blyth Dry Docks & Shipbuilding Co. Ltd	Blyth, Northumberland	United Kingdom	For Blyth Harbour Commissioners.
Unknown date	Brahman	Tug	Cochrane & Son Ltd.	Selby	United Kingdom	For United Towing Co. Ltd.
Unknown date	Coburg	Fishing trawler	Schulte & Bruns	Emden	Germany	For H. Bischoff & Co
Unknown date	Denbighshire	Cargo ship	Nederlands Scheepsbouw Maatschappij	Vlissingen	Netherlands	For Blue Funnel Line.
Unknown date	Eisdanger	Norwegian-type tanker	Sir James Laing & Sons Ltd.	Sunderland	United Kingdom	For Westfal-Larsen & Co. A/S.
Unknown date	Friedrich Karl	Cargo ship	Neptun Werft	Rostock	Germany	For Reederei Wendenhof GmbH
Unknown date	Gabelsflach	tanker	F. Schichau GmbH.	Elbing	Germany	For Kriegsmarine.
Unknown date	Haga	Cargo ship	Flensburger Schiffbau-Gesellschaft	Flensburg	Germany	For Mathies Reederei
Unknown date	Hannah Boge	Cargo ship	Neptun AG	Rostock	Germany	For J. M. K. Blumenthal.
Unknown date	Hohenfels	Cargo ship	Bremer Vulkan Schiffs- und Maschinenbau	Stettin	Germany	For Hansa Line.
Unknown date	John Holt	Cargo ship			United Kingdom	For John Holt & Co (Liverpool) Ltd.
Unknown date	Johnathan Holt	Cargo ship			United Kingdom	For John Holt & Co (Liverpool) Ltd.
Unknown date	Krooman	Tug	Cochrane & Son Ltd.	Selby	United Kingdom	For United Towing Co Ltd.
Unknown date	Luna	Passenger ship	Schiffbau-Gesellschaft Unterweser AG,	Wesermünde	Germany	For Dampfschiffahrts Gesellschaft Neptun AG (Neptun Line).
Unknown date	MMS 51	MMS-class minesweeper	British Power Boat Company	Hythe	United Kingdom	For Royal Navy.
Unknown date	Mountpark	Cargo ship	Charles Connell & Co Ltd	Glasgow	United Kingdom	For J. & J. Denholm Ltd.
Unknown date	Marinia	tug	Cochrne & Sons Ltd.	Selby	United Kingdom	For Overseas Towage & Salvage Co. Ltd.
Unknown date	Neptunia	tug	Cochrne & Sons Ltd.	Selby	United Kingdom	For Overseas Towage & Salvage Co. Ltd.
Unknown date	Norman	Tug	Cochrane & Son Ltd.	Selby	United Kingdom	For United Towing Co. Ltd.
Unknown date	Patria	Ocean liner	Deutsche Werft.	Hamburg	Germany	For private owner.
Unknown date	Pomona	Cargo ship	Deutsche Werft	Hamburg	Germany	For F. Laiesz & Co.
Unknown date	Prospect	Tuna clipper	Campbell Industries	San Diego	United States	For Star & Crescent Boat Company
Unknown date	Sachsen	Sealer	Studen und Reederei GmbH	Beidenfleth	Germany	For Studen und Reederei GmbH.
Unknown date	Salvonia	tug	Cochrane & Sons Ltd.	Selby	United Kingdom	For Overseas Towage & Salvage Co. Ltd.
Unknown date	Sandanger	Norwegian-type tanker	Sir James Laing & Sons Ltd.	Sunderland	United Kingdom	For Westfal-Larsen & Co. A/S.
Unknown date	Schwan	Cargo ship	Howaldtswerke	Kiel	Germany	For Argo Line
Unknown date	Sperber	Light seaplane tender	H. C. Stulcken	Hamburg	Germany	For Luftwaffe use
Unknown date	Süderau	Cargo ship	Deutsche Schiff- und Maschinenbau AG	Bremen	Germany	For Bugsier Reederei und Bergungs AG
Unknown date	Viator	Cargo ship	Oresunds Varvet.	Landskrona	Sweden	For private owner.
Unknown date	Wandsbek	Cargo ship	Moss Vaerft & Dokk.	Moss	Norway	For Knohr & Burchard.
Unknown date	Wellpark	Cargo ship	Charles Connell & Co Ltd	Glasgow	United Kingdom	For J. & J. Denholm Ltd.
Unknown date	Unnamed	Tank barge	Alabama Drydock and Shipbuilding Company	Mobile, Alabama	United States	For private owner.
