= USS Gridley =

Four United States Navy ships have been named USS Gridley in honor of Charles Vernon Gridley.

- USS Gridley (DD-92), was a Wickes-class destroyer, launched in 1918, permanently decommissioned in 1922, and scrapped in 1937
- USS Gridley (DD-380), was the lead ship of her class of destroyers. She was launched in 1936 and struck in 1947
- USS Gridley (DLG-21), was a Leahy-class guided missile frigate, launched in 1961 and struck in 1994. In 1975, the Leahy class was redesignated as guided missile cruisers (CG), and she became CG-21.
- USS Gridley (DDG-101), is an Arleigh Burke-class destroyer. Her keel was laid on 30 July 2004, christened 11 February 2006, and commissioned in Miami on 10 February 2007
