= USS Helm =

Bagley-class destroyer

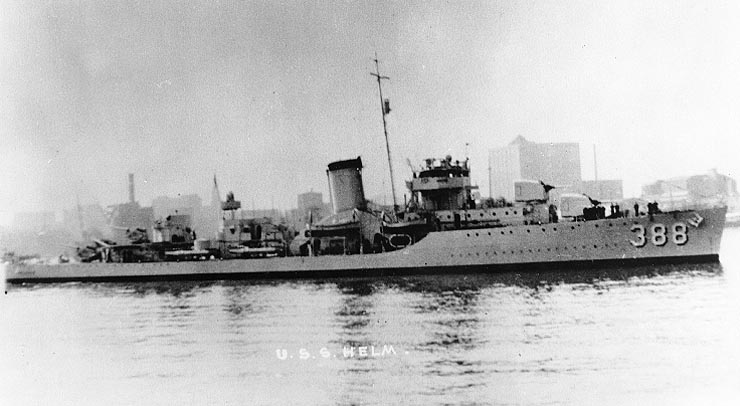
- USS Helm (DD-388)

History

United States
- Namesake: Rear Admiral James Meredith Helm
- Builder: Norfolk Navy Yard
- Laid down: 25 September 1935
- Launched: 27 May 1937
- Commissioned: 16 October 1937
- Decommissioned: 26 June 1946 Decommissioning officer: Lt. Allen G. Sibley
- Stricken: 25 February 1947
- Fate: Sold for scrap, 2 October 1947

General characteristics
- Class & type: Bagley-class destroyer
- Displacement: 2,325 tons (full), 1,500 tons (light)
- Length: 341 ft 8 in (104.14 m)
- Beam: 35 ft 6 in (10.82 m)
- Draft: 10 ft 4 in (3.15 m) light, 12 ft 10 in (3.91 m) full
- Propulsion: 49,000 shp; 2 propellers
- Speed: 38.5 knots (71.3 km/h)
- Range: 6,500 nautical miles (12,000 kilometres); @ 12 kn (22 km/h)
- Complement: 158
- Armament: 4 × 5"/38 caliber guns (12 cm), 4 × .50 cal (12.7 mm) guns, 12 × 21 inch (533 mm) torpedo tubes, 2 × depth charge tracks

USS Helm (DD-388) was a Bagley-class destroyer in the United States Navy during World War II. She was named for Rear Admiral James Meredith Helm. Helm received 11 battle stars for her World War II service in the Pacific.

== Pre-war ==
Helm was launched by Norfolk Navy Yard on 27 May 1937; sponsored by Mrs. J. M. Helm, widow; and commissioned on 16 October 1937, with Lt. Comdr. P. H. Talbot in command.

After shakedown, Helm operated in the Caribbean until March 1938. Following summer exercises, she was attached to the newly formed Atlantic Squadron on 1 October 1938. Early in 1939, she deployed with Carrier Division 2 in the Caribbean for Fleet Problem XX. After being transferred to the West Coast in May 1939, Helm engaged in fleet exercises and screening maneuvers out of San Diego and the Hawaiian Islands.

== Pearl Harbor ==
At 0755 on the morning of 7 December 1941, Helm had just turned into West Loch in Pearl Harbor, en route to deperming buoys, when Japanese carrier planes attacked the naval base. Helm was the only ship under way at the beginning of the attack. The destroyer manned her guns and brought down at least one of the attackers while she was strafed and slightly damaged by two bombs close aboard. At 0817, through the flames and smoke, Helm left West Loch Channel and sped to the open sea through the Pearl Harbor Inlet. As she left the channel, a lookout on board spotted a Japanese miniature submarine, HA. 19, snagged on a reef. Helm turned hard right toward the enemy submarine, shot and missed. The two-man sub broke free and submerged but it snagged again. Trying to escape from the sub, one crewman drowned. The other was washed ashore and became the United States' first World War II prisoner of war. After the attack, Helm joined the task group of carrier USS Saratoga, just arrived from San Diego, and served as a screening ship and anti-aircraft guard.

== 1942 ==
The destroyer sailed 20 January 1942 on a special mission to rescue Department of the Interior workers from Howland and Baker islands. Using her whaleboat Helm brought off six men from the two islands 31 January. She was attacked by a Japanese patrol bomber later that day. Her gunners drove off the attacker and the ship returned to Pearl Harbor on 6 February.

=== New Hebrides operations ===
Following a round trip voyage to San Diego, Helm departed Pearl Harbor 15 March 1942, escorting an advance base party to the New Hebrides. She arrived at Efate on 19 March and for the next few weeks escorted ships in that area while U.S. bases were consolidated. She rescued 13 survivors from SS John Adams on 9 and 4 May from the oiler Neosho, sunk in the Battle of the Coral Sea on 17 May. These men were taken to Brisbane, Australia, where Helm joined the Australian-US Task Force 44, under Rear Admiral Victor Crutchley, on 19 May.

For the next two months Helm, performed escort duty along the Australian Coast. The fleet was then assembling for the first offensive amphibious operation in the Pacific, the capture of Guadalcanal. Helm departed Auckland, New Zealand, on 22 July for the Fiji Islands. Following practice landings Admiral Turner's fleet suddenly struck Guadalcanal and Tulagi, arriving off the beaches on 7 August and catching the Japanese completely by surprise. The destroyer screened the transports as troops disembarked, shooting down several attacking aircraft during the first two days.

=== Battle of Savo Island ===
With the cruisers Vincennes, Quincy, and Astoria, Helm patrolled the waters around Savo Island the night of 7 August and, as night fell on 8 August, the four ships and destroyer Wilson took up patrol between Savo and Florida Islands. Another group of two cruisers and two destroyers patrolled to the south, and picket destroyers Blue and Ralph Talbot were stationed to the northwest of Savo Island. Poor planning and decision-making had allowed Admiral Mikawa's cruisers and destroyers to approach Savo Island undetected. Failures in search and identification had prevented early analysis of the dangerous situation, and the inadequate two-ship screen off Savo Island had not warned of the Japanese ships. The alarm was sounded by destroyer Patterson at about 01:43, just seconds before two torpedoes ripped into HMAS Canberra in the southern group. Soon both formations of cruisers were battling the fierce Japanese attack. Helm, on the port bow of Vincennes, turned back to help the stricken cruisers. She stood by Astoria, brought survivors to transports off Guadalcanal, and withdrew with the remainder of the force to Nouméa on 13 August. The Battle of Savo Island was a disaster, but the Japanese failed to press their attack on the defenseless transports at Guadalcanal. Much desperate fighting followed but the Americans had come to stay.

For the next few weeks Helm remained in the dangerous waters near Guadalcanal, escorting transports and patrolling. She sailed to Brisbane on 7 September and departed the next day to provide escort protection for transports between Australia and New Guinea.

== 1943 ==
The veteran destroyer remained on this duty for some months. On 15 May 1943, Helm assisted in the search for survivors from the Australian hospital ship Centaur that had been torpedoed and sunk by Japanese submarine I-177, south east of Cape Moreton, near Brisbane. Later it escorted LST's to Woodlark Island for an unopposed landing in June 1943 and protected the important base at Milne Bay. As MacArthur's army prepared to move into New Britain under naval cover, Helm bombarded Gasmata on 29 November 1943 and sortied from Milne Bay again on 14 December under Admiral Crutchley for the capture of Cape Gloucester. Helm helped in the pre-invasion bombardment, fired close-support missions after the initial landings, and performed screening duties as transports unloaded. The operation by Admiral Barbey's VII Amphibious Corps was a smooth and successful one and, as soon as the position was secured, Helm and the rest of Admiral Crutchley's fleet moved to Saidor, where Admiral Barbey performed one of his famous amphibious "hops." The destroyer screened the cruiser force as it prevented attack by surface and air forces from seaward.

== 1944 ==
Helm continued her escort duty in the Guadalcanal and Milne Bay areas until departing on 19 February 1944 for Pearl Harbor. The ship proceeded thence to Mare Island Navy Yard escorting the battleship Maryland, and arrived on 4 March.

Helm departed San Francisco on 5 May 1944. After arrival in Pearl Harbor five days later she engaged in refresher training in Hawaiian waters. She arrived Majuro on 4 June and Kwajalein on 7 June to join the naval force assembling for the next step in America's amphibious sweep across the Pacific, the invasion of the Marianas. She joined Vice Admiral Mitscher's famed Task Force 58 and sailed with it from Kwajalein on 7 June. The fast carrier group guarded the western approaches to the islands from 11 to 13 June and provided air support for the landings, which were carried out by Admiral Kelly Turner's amphibian group 1,000 miles from the nearest advance base at Eniwetok. The carrier task forces returned from a strike on the Bonin Islands on 18 June and deployed to repel the Japanese fleet as it closed the Marianas for a decisive naval battle. The great fleets approached each other on 19 June for the biggest carrier engagement of the war. As four large air raids hit the American fleet formation, fighter cover from Helm's task group and surface fire from the ships annihilated the Japanese planes. With able assistance from American submarines, Mitscher succeeded in sinking two Japanese carriers while inflicting such staggering losses on the enemy naval air arm that the battle was dubbed the "Marianas Turkey Shoot." Admiral Spruance had succeeded in protecting the invasion force in a battle the importance of which was well understood by the Japanese. Admiral Toyoda had said on 15 June: "The fate of the Empire rests on this one battle," repeating the words of Admiral Togo at the Battle of Tsushima.

Following the decisive Battle of the Philippine Sea, Helm and the fast carriers turned their attention to neutralizing the enemy bases on the Bonin and Volcano Islands and supporting the invasion of Guam. The mobile carrier groups, screened by destroyers and cruisers, also began attacks on the Palau Islands on 25 July 1944. With occasional respite at Eniwetok or Ulithi, the carriers attacked Iwo Jima and other islands in the western Pacific until well into September. Helm sank a small Japanese freighter off Iwo Jima on 2 September and later that day surprised and sank a small cargo ship.

Helm and her carrier group arrived in Seeadler Harbor on 21 September 1944. They sortied again on 24 September; and, after ground support strikes in the Palaus, rendezvoused with the entire task force of seventeen carriers with their supporting and screening vessels for an important sweep to the west. Strikes were launched against Okinawa on 10 October; after which the carriers turned to their real objective, the airfields and military installations on Formosa. In a devastating 3-day attack carrier planes did much to destroy that island as a supporting base for the Japanese in the battle of the Philippines and other invasions to come. Enemy planes retaliated with heavy and repeated land-based attacks. Helm brought down one bomber with her 5-inch guns on 13 October and assisted in shooting down several more.

Following the Formosa Air Battle, a convincing demonstration of the power and mobility of sea power, Task Force 38 returned to the east coast of Luzon to strike enemy air bases in the Philippines to neutralize Japanese air power during the invasion of Leyte. By 24 October it was clear that the assault on Leyte had called forth one final effort on the part of the Japanese to destroy the American fleet. Its three major fleet units moved toward the Philippines. The Northern Group was to lure the American carriers northward away from Leyte, before the others converged on the assault area in Leyte Gulf for a two-pronged death blow. In for the historic Battle of Leyte Gulf, Helm with Rear Admiral Davison's Task Group 38.4 turned her attention toward Admiral Kurita's Center Force. Planes from the carriers struck the Japanese ships near mid-day in the Battle of the Sibuyan Sea, sinking giant battleship Musashi and damaging other heavy ships.

While two of the other phases of this great battle, the Battle off Samar and the Battle of Surigao Strait, were being fought, Admiral Halsey took the bait and led the carrier groups north to engage the decoy fleet of Admiral Ozawa. Screened by Helm and other surface units, the carriers made air contact on 25 October and, in a series of devastating strikes, sank four Japanese carriers and a destroyer. The great sea battle was thus ended, with the invasion of Leyte secured and the Japanese fleet no longer an effective fighting unit.

Helm and the carriers resumed direct support of ground operations on Leyte on 26 October. In addition to air attacks by land-based Japanese aircraft, the group also experienced submarine attack on 28 October. Helm and companion destroyer Gridley made a contact around noon and, as the carriers cleared the area, the two ships dropped depth charges and sank I-46. Two carriers, Franklin and Belleau Wood, were damaged on 30 October by suicide planes. That night the group retired toward Ulithi, where it arrived on 2 November after over two months of almost continuous service.

Departing Ulithi again on 5 November 1944, Helm and her carrier group returned to the Philippines for strikes against Japanese shipping and shore targets, returning on 20 November. Helm was then detached from Task Group 38.4 and steamed from Ulithi for Manus on 20 November. Arriving two days later, the ship began preparations for the next important amphibious operation in the Philippine campaign, the landings at Lingayen Gulf on Luzon. Helm departed on 27 December with a large task group bound for Lingayen Gulf.

== 1945 ==
As the ships entered the Sulu Sea, heavy air attacks began. The Japanese struck with suicide planes on 4 January 1945 and sank escort carrier Ommaney Bay. Gunfire from Helm and the other screening ships took a heavy toll of the attackers. From 6 to 17 January the destroyer operated with carriers west of Lingayen Gulf providing air support for these important landings. The ships departed on 17 January and arrived in Ulithi six days later.

As the great naval task force assembled for the invasion of Iwo Jima, next stop on the island road to Japan, Helm sailed on 12 February in the screen of a group of escort carriers, arriving off the volcanic island fortress on 16 February. She screened the carriers during the preliminary strikes and protected them while they lent close support to the invasion, which began on the 19th. The carrier groups were hit repeatedly by desperate air attacks, with Helm and the other destroyers accounting for many suicide and torpedo planes. When escort carrier Bismarck Sea was sunk in a suicide attack on 21 February, Helm rescued survivors and brought them to the transport anchorage next day.

The veteran destroyer continued screening operations off Iwo Jima until 7 March when she steamed toward Leyte for repairs. She was soon underway again, however, for the last and largest of the Pacific amphibious operations, the invasion of Okinawa. Sailing on 27 March, she joined escort carrier groups off the island for pre-invasion strikes; and, after the historic assault on 1 April, for ground support operations. During her stay off Okinawa the destroyer shot down many suicide planes which menaced the carriers during fanatical, last-ditch efforts by the Japanese to repel the invasion. Helm steamed to Leyte on 19 June with Okinawa secured.

== Post-war ==
Following the Okinawa operation Helm served as an escort and patrol ship out of Ulithi and Leyte, and helped to search for survivors of ill-fated Indianapolis from 3 to 6 August 1945. The ship was steaming toward Ulithi from Okinawa when the war ended on 15 August. She returned to Okinawa and finally to Iwo Jima to join the Bonins patrol, for air-sea rescue work until 8 September. The destroyer then sailed to Sasebo, Japan, where she served as shipping guide and patrol vessel until returning to Okinawa on 26 September. After another stay in Japan, the ship departed for Pearl Harbor and San Diego on 29 October.

She returned to the United States on 19 November, then sailed back to Pearl Harbor where she was decommissioned on 26 June 1946. Helm was used that summer as a target ship during the historic Operation Crossroads atomic tests in the Pacific, and her hulk was sold to Moore Dry Dock Co., Oakland, California, in October 1947 for scrapping.
