= USS Gridley (DD-380) =

Gridley-class destroyer

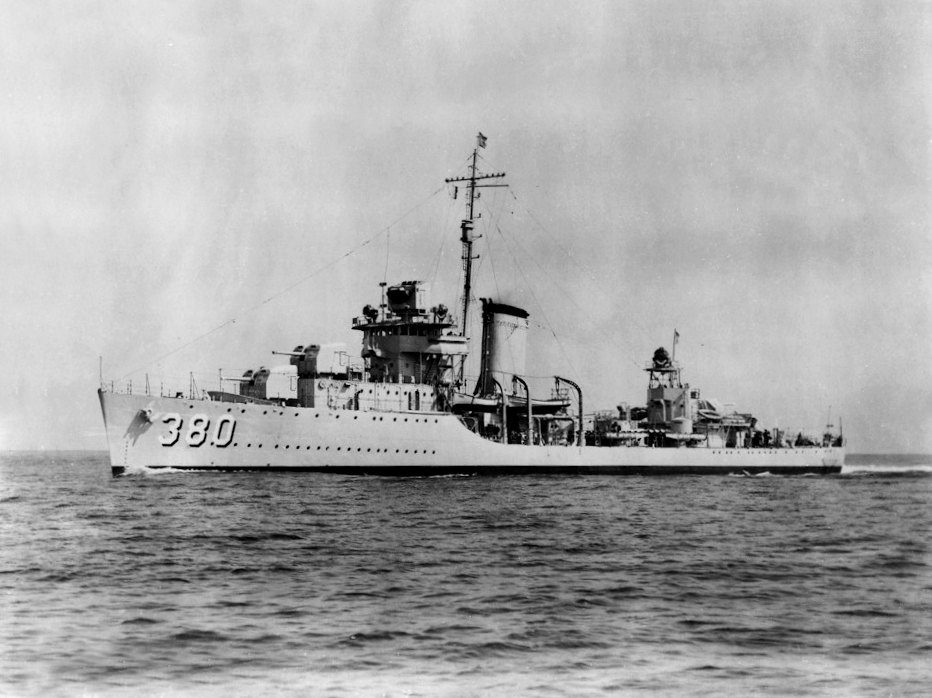
- USS Gridley

History

United States
- Name: Gridley
- Namesake: Charles Vernon Gridley
- Builder: Bethlehem Shipbuilding Corporation, Fore River Shipyard
- Laid down: 3 June 1935
- Launched: 1 December 1936
- Commissioned: 24 June 1937
- Decommissioned: 18 April 1946
- Stricken: 25 February 1947
- Identification: DD-380
- Fate: Sold 20 August 1947 and scrapped

General characteristics
- Class & type: Gridley-class destroyer
- Displacement: 1590 tons, 2219 tons full
- Length: 340 ft 10 in (103.89 m)
- Beam: 35 ft 10 in (10.92 m)
- Draft: 12 ft 9 in (3.89 m)
- Propulsion: 50,000 shp (37,000 kW) Bethlehem geared turbines, 2 screws
- Speed: 38.5 knots (71.3 km/h; 44.3 mph)
- Range: 6,500 nmi (12,000 km; 7,500 mi) at 12 kn (22 km/h; 14 mph)
- Complement: 158
- Armament: 4 x 5 in (127 mm)/38 cal. guns; 4 x .50 cal (12.7 mm) machine guns; 16 x 21 inch (533 mm) torpedo tubes

The second USS Gridley (DD-380) was the lead ship of her class of destroyers in the United States Navy. She was the second US Navy ship named for Charles Vernon Gridley. She served with distinction in the Pacific Theater during the Second World War and shared in the sinking of a Japanese submarine.

== History ==
Gridley was launched at the Fore River Shipyard of Bethlehem Shipbuilding Corporation, Quincy, Massachusetts, 1 December 1936; sponsored by Mrs. Lewis Buddy III, daughter of Captain Gridley; and commissioned 24 June 1937.

Gridley fitted out at Boston Navy Yard, and conducted shakedown in the Caribbean area until 27 October 1938, visiting Puerto Rico, Cuba, and Venezuela. She then underwent alterations at the Boston Navy Yard until 13 June 1938, when she departed that port, transited the Panama Canal, and entered San Diego harbor 5 July 1938. Joining Destroyer Division 11, Gridley spent the next months in tactical maneuvers off the coast of California, and 4 January 1939 departed with the Battle Force for combined maneuvers in the Caribbean. She participated in Fleet Problem 20 with the Fleet off Cuba and Haiti, after which she returned to Boston for repairs.

The destroyer again sailed into San Diego 13 July 1939 and became flagship of Division 11. She conducted maneuvers off California until 2 April 1940, when Gridley and other ships of the fleet conducted Fleet Problem 21 in Hawaiian waters. Subsequently, Gridley operated out of Hawaii.

=== World War II ===
Gridley cleared Pearl Harbor 28 November 1941 as part of the antisubmarine screen for the aircraft carrier Enterprise, flagship of Admiral Halsey, and after a stop at Wake Island, reversed course for Pearl Harbor. The Task Force was approaching that base on the morning of 7 December when the message heralding the beginning of the war was received: "Air raid on Pearl Harbor, this is no drill." Gridley entered the harbor next day to help protect against renewed attack, and during the next five months was occupied escorting transports and repair vessels to and from Pearl Harbor and South Pacific ports. Her last such voyage was completed from 27 May 1942 and 5 June 1942 she arrived at Kodiak, Alaska, with the cruiser Nashville. In the Alaskan theater, Gridley escorted transports and patrolled the Japanese-held islands of Kiska and Attu, assisting in the bombardment of Kiska 7 August 1942. She acted during this period as flagship for famous destroyerman Comdr. Frederick Moosbrugger.

Departing Dutch Harbor 25 September 1942, Gridley joined the Saratoga task force in Hawaiian waters and later performed escort missions for both combatant and non-combatant ships in the Fijis and New Hebrides. In December 1942 she escorted oiler Cimarron out of Noumea to fueling rendezvous with the carrier task forces supporting the bitter fighting in the Solomons. Shifting her base of operations to Purvis Bay, in the Solomons, 13 July, Gridley guarded the high-speed transports which rescued survivors from the cruiser Helena in Parasco Bay 16 July 1943, and teamed with destroyer Maury to escort infantry landing craft from Guadalcanal for the landings on Tambatuni, New Georgia. She bombarded shore installations near the invasion beaches 25 July and screened the ships supporting the landing. In company with six other destroyers she destroyed Japanese landing barges in Vella Gulf 10 August, and screened Saratoga during air operations in the Solomons until 25 August.

Gridley returned to Pearl Harbor with escort carriers Suwanee and Long Island on 4 September 1943 and then departed for San Diego, where she remained for repairs 11 September to 26 October 1943. The Gilbert Islands were her next destination, and Gridley left Pearl Harbor once more 10 November 1943 for Makin Island. She assisted in the bombardment of that island, screened aircraft carriers, and then conducted independent patrol in the area until setting course for Hawaii 1 December.

=== 1944 ===
Vice Admiral Marc A. Mitscher's Carrier Task Force 58 departed Pearl Harbor 18 January 1944 for the offensive in the Marshall Islands, with Gridley again acting as screening ship for Saratoga. Gridley guarded the carrier during the strikes against Wotje and Eniwetok, and 8 March sailed for the New Hebrides with carriers Yorktown, Princeton, and Langley, assisting them in support of the developing New Guinea offensive. The destroyer sailed with the Hornet task force 7 June 1944 to take part in the invasion of the Marianas, where the carriers pounded Saipan, Rota, and Guam. In all these operations Gridley and her sister destroyers protected the carriers against air and submarine attack.

Gridley was with American forces in the pivotal Battle of the Philippine Sea 19 to 20 June 1944, when four waves of Japanese torpedo bombers and escorting fighters were decimated by fleet air and surface units. Gridley's antiaircraft fire helped to protect the aircraft carriers, with the result that Japanese air strength was virtually ended with this battle.

Gridley departed Eniwetok Atoll 30 June 1944 bound with the carriers for strikes on Iwo Jima, Guam, Yap, Ulithi, and the Volcano Islands. She supported directly the American landings on Peleliu 15 September 1944, shooting down at least one Japanese attack plane. After screening the carriers in attacks on Okinawa and Formosa, Gridley joined the American forces for the invasion of the Philippines. While protecting the large ships off Luzon 28 October 1944 she and destroyer Helm detected and sank the Japanese submarine I-51 with a series of devastating depth charge attacks. In the succeeding days, Gridley fought off Japanese kamikazes and returned to Ulithi with damaged carriers Franklin and Belleau Wood on 2 November.

=== 1945 ===
Gridley was soon at sea again, however, clearing Ulithi 5 November with the fast carrier task force for the Leyte operation. She later joined a group of escort carriers and served as a bombardment and patrol ship during the landings in Lingayen Gulf until 10 February 1945.

After stopping again at Ulithi, Gridley escorted battleship Mississippi en route to Pearl Harbor, and then sailed via San Diego and the Panama Canal for New York, where she arrived 30 March 1945. She entered the New York Navy Yard next day for much-needed repairs, and after finishing her overhaul departed the United States 22 June 1945. She served in Europe from July 1945 to January 1946.

== Fate ==
Gridley was decommissioned on 18 April 1946. She was sold for scrap in August 1947.

== Awards ==
- American Defense Service Medal
- Asiatic-Pacific Campaign Medal with 10 battle stars
- World War II Victory Medal
- Navy Occupation Medal with "Europe" clasp
