= Griddy (disambiguation) =

Griddy is a dance move.

Griddy may also refer to:

- Griddy (company), an energy retailer
- The Griddys, an American football award in Indiana, presented by Regional Radio Sports Network
- Griddy's Doughnuts ("Griddy's"), a fictional donut restaurant in The Umbrella Academy; see List of The Umbrella Academy characters

== See also ==
- Gritty
- Gridley (disambiguation)
- Grid (disambiguation)
