= Gridley =

Gridley may refer to:

== Places ==
- Gridley, California
- Gridley, Illinois
- Gridley, Iowa
- Gridley, Kansas
- Gridley Mountain, a peak in Connecticut
- The Gridley River in New Hampshire

== People ==
- Asahel Gridley, Illinois politician
- Reuel Colt Gridley fundraiser for the relief of Union soldiers during the American Civil War
- Charles Vernon Gridley ("You may fire when ready, Gridley.")
  - USS Gridley, any of four ships named in honor of Charles Vernon Gridley
- Richard Gridley, Chief Engineer to George Washington
