= Bagley-class destroyer =

Destroyer class of the US Navy

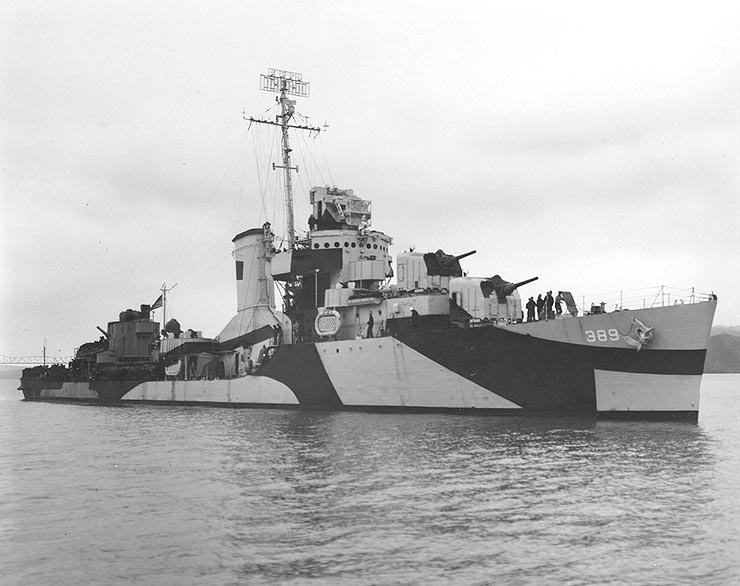
- USS Mugford on 28 April 1944

Class overview
- Name: Bagley-class destroyer
- Builders: Norfolk Naval Shipyard (3); Boston Navy Yard (2); Puget Sound Naval Shipyard (2); Mare Island Naval Shipyard (1)
- Operators: United States Navy
- Preceded by: Gridley class
- Succeeded by: Somers class
- Built: 1935–37
- In commission: 1937–46
- Completed: 8
- Lost: 3
- Retired: 5

General characteristics
- Type: Destroyer
- Displacement: 1,407 tons (light), 1,624 tons (standard), 2,245 tons (full load)
- Length: 341 ft 8 in (104.14 m)
- Beam: 35 ft 6 in (10.82 m)
- Draft: 10 ft 4 in (3.15 m) light; 12 ft 10 in (3.91 m) full
- Installed power: 4 Babcock & Wilcox boilers, 2 geared steam turbines, 47,191 shp (35,190 kW) on trials
- Propulsion: 2 shafts
- Speed: 36.8 knots (68.2 km/h) on trials
- Range: 6,940 nmi (12,850 km; 7,990 mi) at 12 knots (22 km/h; 14 mph)
- Complement: 8 officers, 150 enlisted (peacetime); 251 (wartime)
- Sensors & processing systems: Mk33 GFCS; 1 × SC radar
- Armament: As built: 4 × 5 inch (127 mm)/38 caliber guns; 4 × .50 caliber machine guns (12.7 mm); 16 × 21 inch (533 mm) torpedo tubes (4 × 4); 2 × Depth charge racks; Circa 1943: 4 × 5 inch (127 mm)/38 caliber guns; 2 × 40 mm Bofors cannon (1.6 in) (1 × 2); 6 × 20 mm Oerlikon cannon (0.8 in); 16 × 21 inch (533 mm) torpedo tubes (4 × 4); 4 × K-gun depth charge throwers; 2 × Depth charge racks

The Bagley class of eight destroyers was built for the United States Navy. They were part of a series of USN destroyers limited to 1,500 tons standard displacement by the London Naval Treaty and built in the 1930s. All eight ships were ordered and laid down in 1935 and subsequently completed in 1937. Their layout was based on the concurrently-built Gridley class destroyer design and was similar to the Benham class as well; all three classes were notable for including sixteen 21 inch (533 mm) torpedo tubes, the heaviest torpedo armament ever on US destroyers. They retained the fuel-efficient power plants of the Mahan-class destroyers, and thus had a slightly lower speed than the Gridleys. However, they had the extended range of the Mahans, 1,400 nautical miles (2,600 km) farther than the Gridleys. The Bagley class destroyers were readily distinguished visually by the prominent external trunking of the boiler uptakes around their single stack.

All eight Bagley-class destroyers were present at the attack on Pearl Harbor on 7 December 1941. They all served in the Pacific during World War II, with Jarvis, Blue, and Henley lost in combat. In 1944 Mugford suffered extensive damage from a kamikaze hit that put her out of combat for six months. Ralph Talbot later received a kamikaze hit off Okinawa. After the war, Bagley, Helm, and Patterson were decommissioned in 1945 and scrapped in 1947. Mugford and Ralph Talbot, still in commission, were targets during the Operation Crossroads atomic bomb tests at Bikini Atoll in 1946. Contaminated by radiation, they were scuttled off Kwajalein in 1948.

== Design ==
The eight Bagleys were part of a series of three classes with similar characteristics laid down 1935-1937. The other two were the Gridley class (4 ships) and the Benham class (10 ships). All three featured four 5-inch (127 mm) dual purpose guns (anti-surface and anti-aircraft) and sixteen 21-inch (533 mm) torpedo tubes in four quadruple mounts as built, the largest number of torpedo tubes on any US destroyers. Although all had only one stack, they differed primarily in their machinery. The Bagleys were a Navy design that duplicated the machinery of the preceding long-range Mahan class; this led to their prominent boiler uptakes around the single stack that were their main recognition feature. The Gridleys were designed by Bethlehem Shipbuilding Company with advanced high-pressure boilers (also built by Bethlehem) but turbines generally similar to the earlier Farragut class, which limited their range. The Benhams were a Gibbs & Cox design with another new boiler design that allowed a reduction from four boilers to three, with an efficient turbine arrangement resembling the Mahans'.

=== Engineering ===
The Bagleys' propulsion plant repeated that of the Mahans. Steam pressure was 400 psi (2,800 kPa), superheated to 700 °F (371 °C). Features that improved fuel economy included boiler economizers, double reduction gearing, and cruising turbines. The ships' range was 6,940 nmi (12,850 km; 7,990 mi) at 12 knots (22 km/h; 14 mph), 1,400 nmi (2,600 km; 1,600 mi) farther than the Gridleys. The engines developed 47,191 shp (35,190 kW) on Bagley's trials. The main turbines were manufactured by General Electric. Each main turbine was divided into a high-pressure (HP) and a low-pressure (LP) turbine feeding into a common reduction gear to drive a shaft, in a similar manner to the machinery illustrated at the following reference. Steam from the boilers was supplied to the HP turbine, which exhausted to the LP turbine, which exhausted to a condenser. The cruising turbines were geared to the HP turbines and could be engaged or disengaged as needed; at low speeds they were operated in series with the HP turbines to improve the efficiency of the overall turbine arrangement, thus improving fuel economy.

== Armament ==
The Bagleys had the same armament as the Gridleys and Benhams: four 5-inch (127 mm) dual purpose guns (anti-surface and anti-aircraft (AA)) in single mounts and sixteen 21-inch (533 mm) torpedo tubes in quadruple mounts. The class was initially equipped with the Mark 11 torpedo or Mark 12 torpedo, which were replaced by the Mark 15 torpedo beginning in 1938. This was the heaviest armament in torpedoes ever on US destroyers. Compared with the Mahans, they sacrificed one gun for four additional torpedo tubes. It was suggested that these ships could use "curved ahead fire", using the adjustable post-launch gyro angle of their torpedoes to launch a sixteen-torpedo spread ahead of the ship. One reason for the heavy destroyer torpedo armament was that, alone among the major navies, the last nine of the seventeen US Treaty cruisers built in the 1920s and 1930s lacked torpedoes; eventually all of the US Treaty cruisers' torpedoes were removed in 1941 in favor of additional heavy AA guns.

As with most other US destroyers of this period, the 5-inch guns featured all-angle power loading and were director controlled, making them as effective as the technology allowed against aircraft. By late 1942, radio proximity fuses (VT fuses) made them much more effective. As in the last two Mahans, the two forward 5-inch guns were in enclosed mounts, while the aft guns were open. However, in common with all US surface combatants in the 1930s, the light AA armament was weak; only four .50 caliber machine guns (12.7 mm) were equipped. It was apparently felt that the heavy AA armament would shoot down most incoming aircraft in all situations, but the attack on Pearl Harbor showed that this was not true. The Bagleys' weak AA armament was partially remedied after Pearl Harbor by replacing the machine guns with one twin 40 mm Bofors (1.6 in) mount and six 20 mm Oerlikon cannon (0.8 in). While most American destroyers had some or all torpedo tubes replaced by light AA guns during World War II, the Bagleys did not.

As with their contemporaries, the Bagleys' anti-submarine warfare (ASW) armament started with two depth charge racks aft. Photographs show that these were augmented during World War II by four K-gun depth charge throwers on at least some ships.

== Service ==
All eight Bagley-class destroyers were present at the attack on Pearl Harbor on 7 December 1941, comprising Destroyer Squadron Four. They all served in the Pacific during World War II, with Jarvis, Blue, and Henley lost in combat. In 1944 Mugford suffered extensive damage from a kamikaze hit that put her out of combat for six months. The remaining four Bagleys continued to operate as Destroyer Squadron Six, with Ralph Talbot receiving a kamikaze hit off Okinawa. Bagley accepted the surrender of Japanese forces on Marcus Island. Bagley, Helm, and Patterson were decommissioned in 1945 and scrapped in 1947. Mugford and Ralph Talbot, still in commission, were targets during the Operation Crossroads atomic bomb tests at Bikini Atoll in 1946. Contaminated by radiation, they were scuttled off Kwajalein in 1948.

== Ships in class ==
Ships of the Bagley destroyer class
Name	Hull no.	Builder	Laid down	Launched	Commissioned	Decommissioned	Fate	Ref
Bagley	DD-386	Norfolk Navy Yard	31 July 1935	3 September 1936	12 June 1937	14 June 1946	Sold for scrap, 8 September 1947	
Blue	DD-387	Norfolk Navy Yard	25 September 1935	27 May 1937	14 August 1937	—N/a	Sunk by enemy action off Guadalcanal, 22 August 1942	
Helm	DD-388	Norfolk Navy Yard	25 September 1935	27 May 1937	16 October 1937	26 June 1946	Sold for scrap, 2 October 1947	
Mugford	DD-389	Boston Navy Yard	28 October 1935	31 October 1936	16 August 1937	29 August 1946	Scuttled off Kwajalein, 22 March 1948	
Ralph Talbot	DD-390	Boston Navy Yard	28 October 1935	31 October 1936	14 October 1937	29 August 1946	Scuttled off Kwajalein, 8 March 1948	
Henley	DD-391	Mare Island Navy Yard	28 October 1935	12 January 1937	14 August 1937	—N/a	Sunk by enemy action off New Guinea, 3 October 1943	
Patterson	DD-392	Puget Sound Navy Yard	23 July 1935	6 May 1937	22 September 1937	8 November 1945	Sold for scrap, 18 August 1947	
Jarvis	DD-393	Puget Sound Navy Yard	21 August 1935	6 May 1937	27 October 1937	—N/a	Sunk by enemy action off Guadalcanal, 9 August 1942	

== See also ==
- Gridley-class destroyer
- Benham-class destroyer
- List of destroyer classes of the United States Navy
- List of United States Navy losses in World War II
- List of ship classes of the Second World War
