= USS Gridley (DDG-101) =

Arleigh Burke-class destroyer

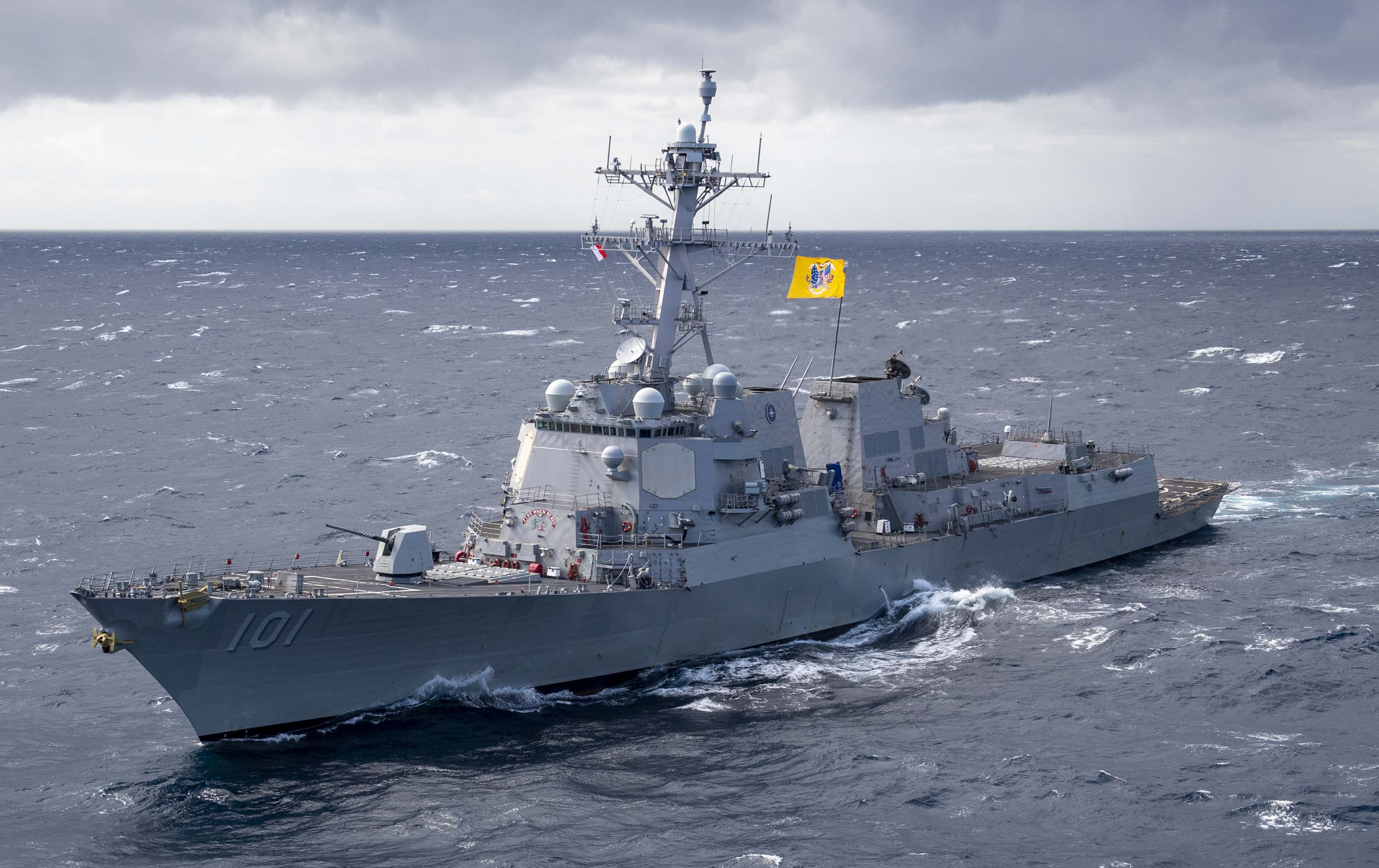
- USS Gridley in 2019

History

United States
- Name: Gridley
- Namesake: Charles Vernon Gridley
- Ordered: 6 March 1998
- Builder: Bath Iron Works
- Laid down: 30 July 2004
- Launched: 28 December 2005
- Commissioned: 10 February 2007
- Home port: Everett
- Identification: MMSI number: 369961000; Hull number: DDG-101; Call sign: NBMB
- Motto: Ignis Ubi Paratus; (Fire when ready)
- Status: in active service
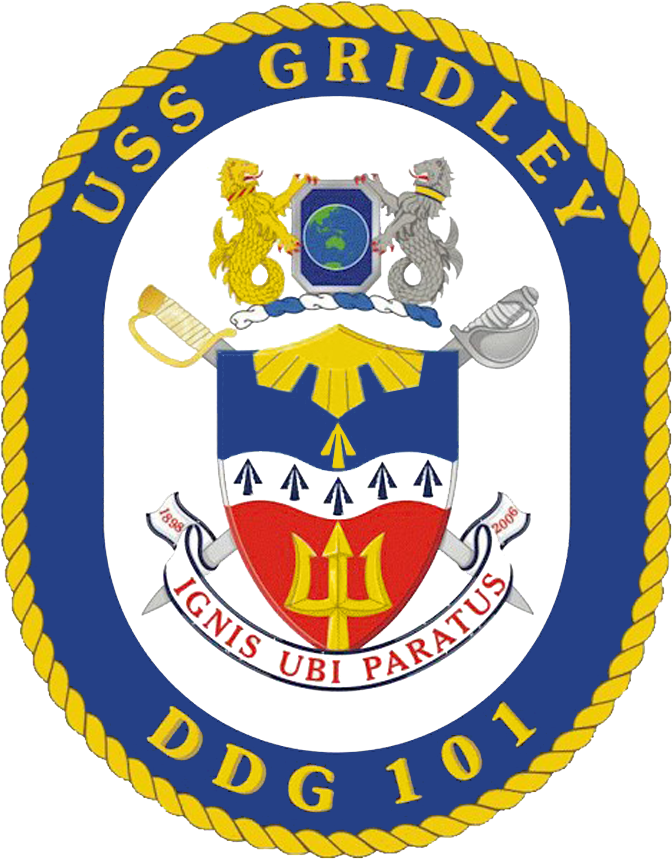
- Badge

General characteristics
- Class & type: Arleigh Burke-class destroyer
- Displacement: 9,200 long tons (9,300 t)
- Length: 509 ft 6 in (155.30 m)
- Beam: 66 ft (20 m)
- Draught: 31 ft (9.4 m)
- Propulsion: 4 × General Electric LM2500-30 gas turbines, 2 shafts, 100,000 shp (75 MW)
- Speed: >30 kn (56 km/h; 35 mph)
- Complement: 380 officers and enlisted
- Armament: Guns: 1 × 5-inch (127 mm)/62 Mk 45 Mod 4 (lightweight gun); 1 × 20 mm (0.8 in) Phalanx CIWS; 2 × 25 mm (0.98 in) Mk 38 machine gun system; 4 × 0.50 in (12.7 mm) caliber guns; Missiles: 1 × 32-cell, 1 × 64-cell (96 total cells) Mk 41 vertical launching system (VLS): RIM-66M surface-to-air missile; RIM-156 surface-to-air missile; RIM-174A Standard ERAM; RIM-161 anti-ballistic missile; RIM-162 ESSM (quad-packed); BGM-109 Tomahawk cruise missile; RUM-139 vertical launch ASROC; Torpedoes: 2 × Mark 32 triple torpedo tubes: Mark 46 lightweight torpedo; Mark 50 lightweight torpedo; Mark 54 lightweight torpedo
- Aircraft carried: 2 × MH-60R Seahawk helicopters

The fourth USS Gridley (DDG-101) is an Arleigh Burke-class (Flight IIA) Aegis guided missile destroyer in the United States Navy. Gridley is named after Captain Charles Gridley, commander of Admiral George Dewey's flagship USS Olympia, (Flag Captain) and recipient of Admiral Dewey's famous command, "You may fire when you are ready, Gridley" in the Battle of Manila Bay during the Spanish–American War.

== Construction and career ==
In May 2004, the Secretary of the Navy announced the names of five new Arleigh Burke-class destroyers, including Gridley. Her keel was laid on 30 July 2004 at the Bath Iron Works in Bath, Maine. She was christened on 11 February 2006. The Gridley was commissioned at the Port of Miami on Saturday, 10 February 2007.

She has joined the Pacific Fleet and is homeported at Naval Station Everett.

Gridley departed Naval Base San Diego on 19 May 2008 for her maiden deployment and returned on 25 November 2008.

On 22 August 2014 Gridley departed the naval base for a scheduled 10-month deployment, along with USS Bunker Hill and USS Carl Vinson, returning on 4 June 2015.

On 9 July 2016 Gridley arrived at her new homeport in Everett, Washington.

In December 2021, Gridley departed Everett, on deployment as part of Destroyer Squadron 21, along with Carrier Strike Group 3 led by the USS Abraham Lincoln on a scheduled deployment.

Gridley participated in RIMPAC 2022.

On May 20, 2026, Gridley had been deployed along with USS Nimitz (CVN-68) and her Carrier Strike Group to the Caribbean to support Operation Southern Spear as tensions with Cuba rise.

== Awards ==
- Secretary of the Navy Safety Excellence Award, Afloat - (2022)
