= USS Gridley (DD-92) =

Wickes-class destroyer

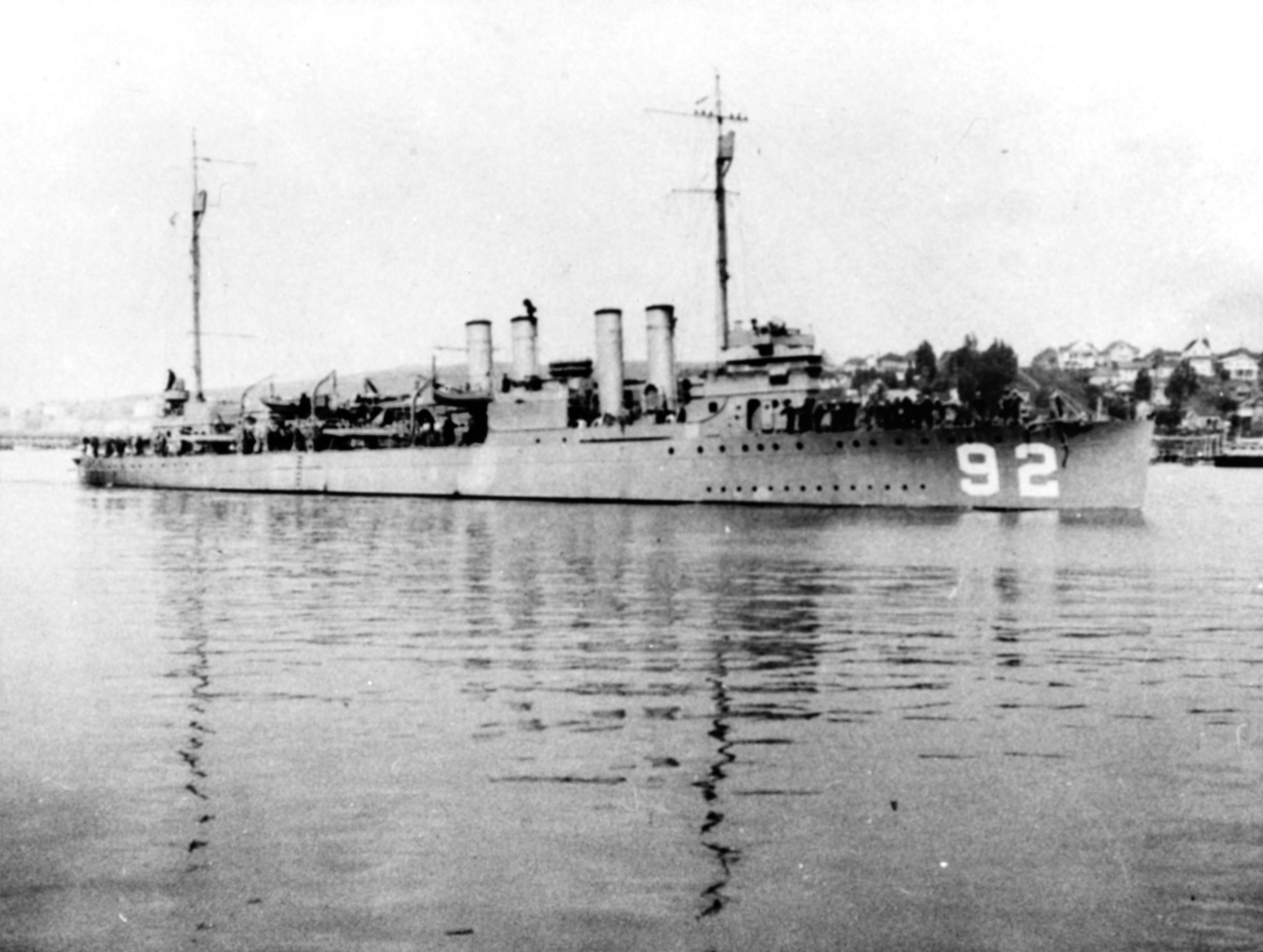
- USS Gridley

History

United States
- Name: Gridley
- Namesake: Charles Vernon Gridley
- Builder: Union Iron Works, San Francisco, California
- Laid down: 1 April 1918
- Launched: 4 July 1918
- Commissioned: 8 March 1919
- Decommissioned: 22 June 1922
- Stricken: 25 January 1937
- Fate: Sold for scrap, 19 April 1939

General characteristics
- Class & type: Wickes-class destroyer
- Displacement: 1,060 tons
- Length: 315 ft 5 in (96.1 m)
- Beam: 31 ft 8 in (9.7 m)
- Draft: 9 ft 2 in (2.8 m)
- Speed: 35 knots (65 km/h)
- Complement: 100 officers and enlisted
- Armament: 4 × 4 in (102 mm)/50 guns; 12 × 21 in (533 mm) torpedo tubes

The first USS Gridley (DD-92) was a Wickes-class destroyer in the United States Navy during World War I. She was named in honor of Charles Vernon Gridley.

== History ==
Gridley was launched by the Union Iron Works of San Francisco, California on 4 July 1918, sponsored by Mrs. Francis P. Thomas, the daughter of Captain Gridley. The destroyer was commissioned on 8 March 1919, Comdr. Frank Jack Fletcher in command.

After fitting out at the Mare Island Navy Yard, Gridley departed San Diego on 24 March 1919, transited the Panama Canal, and joined the Destroyer Force for maneuvers in Cuban waters. She then repaired briefly at Norfolk, Virginia, before putting into New York on 26 April 1919. Gridley's first assignment was with a group of destroyers posted along the route of the Navy's transatlantic seaplane flight. Gridley and her companions sent up smoke and flare signals to guide the intrepid flyers and with the help of the surface ships the aircraft NC-4 was successfully able to land in the dense fog at the Azores on 17 May 1919. Subsequently Gridley participated in the search for the aircraft NC-1, forced down in the fog, and then acted as guard ship on the last leg of NC-4's historic flight, which was completed at Plymouth, England on 31 May 1919.

Gridley arrived at Brest, France on 31 May and spent the next two months in various ports of the Mediterranean transporting passengers and making goodwill visits. She arrived back at New York on 31 July. Operating out of Portsmouth, New Hampshire, Gridley embarked Major General Lejeune and Brigadier General Butler of the Marine Corps at Charleston on 2 September 1920, for an inspection tour of Caribbean bases and commands, including posts in Cuba, Haiti, and the Dominican Republic. Her passengers disembarked on 27 September 1920.

In the following years Gridley was active training officers and men of the Naval Reserve Force, operating out of Charleston, Newport, New York, and Philadelphia. She decommissioned at Philadelphia Navy Yard on 22 June 1922 and remained inactive until her name was stricken from the Navy List on 25 January 1937. Gridley's hulk was sold for scrapping on 19 April 1939.
