= Gridley-class destroyer =

Destroyer class of the US Navy

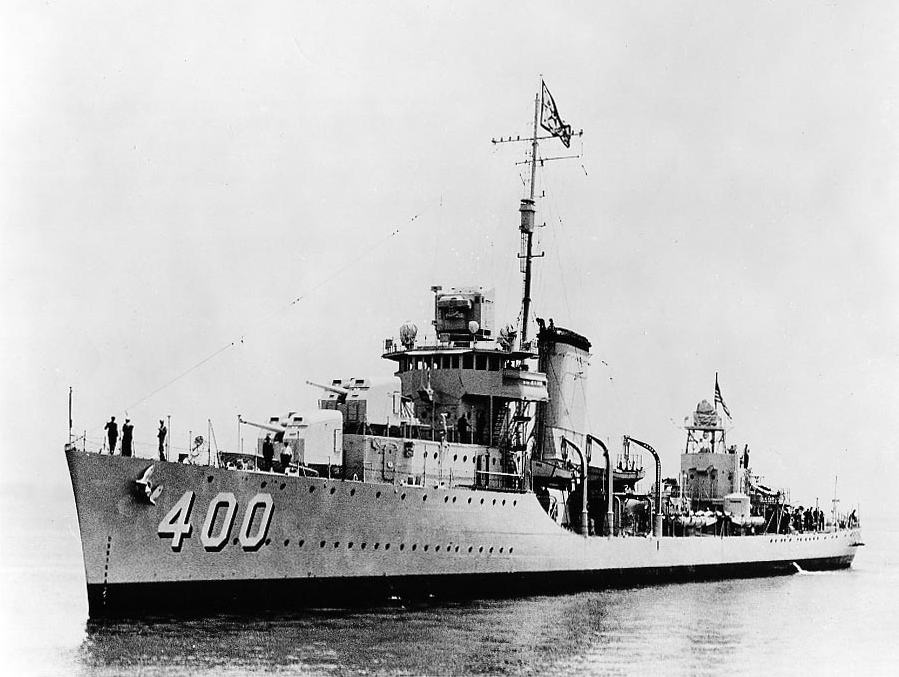
- USS McCall in 1938

Class overview
- Name: Gridley-class destroyer
- Builders: Bethlehem Fore River, MA; Bethlehem San Francisco, CA
- Operators: United States Navy
- Preceded by: Mahan class
- Succeeded by: Bagley class
- Built: 1935–1938
- In commission: 1937–1946
- Completed: 4
- Retired: 4

General characteristics
- Type: Destroyer
- Displacement: 1590 tons standard, 2219 tons full load
- Length: 340 ft 10 in (103.89 m)
- Beam: 35 ft 10 in (10.92 m)
- Draft: 12 ft 9 in (3.89 m)
- Installed power: 4 Yarrow boilers, 2 Bethlehem Parsons-type geared steam turbines, 47,000 shp (35,000 kW)
- Propulsion: 2 shafts
- Speed: 38.5 knots (71.3 km/h; 44.3 mph)
- Range: 5,520 nautical miles (10,220 km; 6,350 mi) at 12 kn (22 km/h; 14 mph)
- Complement: 8 officers, 150 enlisted (peacetime); 250 (wartime)
- Sensors & processing systems: Mk33 GFCS
- Armament: As built: 4 × 5 inch (127 mm)/38 caliber guns; 4 × .50 caliber machine guns (12.7 mm); 16 × 21 inch (533 mm) torpedo tubes (4 × 4); 2 × Depth charge racks; Circa 1943: 4 × 5 inch (127 mm)/38 caliber guns; 7 × 20 mm Oerlikon cannon (0.8 in); 16 × 21 inch (533 mm) torpedo tubes (4 × 4); 4 × K-gun depth charge throwers; 2 × Depth charge racks

The Gridley-class destroyers were a class of four 1500-ton destroyers in the United States Navy. Named for Charles Vernon Gridley, they were part of a series of USN destroyers limited to 1,500 tons standard displacement by the London Naval Treaty and built in the 1930s. The first two ships were laid down on 3 June 1935 and commissioned in 1937. The second two were laid down in March 1936 and commissioned in 1938. Based on the preceding Mahan-class destroyers with somewhat different machinery, they had the same hull but had only a single stack and mounted sixteen 21 inch (533 mm) torpedo tubes, an increase of four. To compensate for the increased torpedo armament weight, the gun armament was slightly reduced from five 5"/38 caliber guns (127 mm) to four. USS Maury (DD-401) made the highest trial speed ever recorded for a United States Navy destroyer, 42.8 knots. All four ships served extensively in World War II, notably in the Solomon Islands and the Battle of the Philippine Sea, with Maury receiving a Presidential Unit Citation.

== Design ==
The four Gridleys were part of a series of three classes with similar characteristics laid down 1935-1937. The other two were the Bagley class (8 ships) and the Benham class (10 ships). All three featured four 5 inch (127 mm) guns and sixteen 21 inch (533 mm) torpedo tubes in four quadruple mounts as built, the largest number of torpedo tubes on any US destroyers. Although all had only one stack, they differed primarily in their machinery. The Gridleys were designed by Bethlehem Shipbuilding Company with advanced high-pressure boilers (also built by Bethlehem) but turbines generally similar to the earlier Farragut class, which limited their range. The Bagleys were a Navy design that duplicated the machinery of the preceding long-range Mahan class. The Benhams were a Gibbs & Cox design with another new boiler design that allowed a reduction from four boilers to three, with an efficient turbine arrangement resembling the Mahans'.

=== Engineering ===
The Gridleys' boilers were a significant upgrade from the Mahan class, with steam pressure increased from 465 psi (3,210 kPa) to 565 psi (3,900 kPa), superheated in both cases to 700 °F (371 °C). The increased steam pressure contributed to fuel economy. The boilers were Yarrow-type boilers built by Bethlehem Steel. However, the turbines were generally similar to the Farragut class, and thus were less efficient than those in the Mahan class. They were Parsons-type reaction turbines built by Bethlehem Steel, with single-reduction gearing and no cruising turbines. The result was a reduced range of 5,520 nautical miles (10,220 km; 6,350 mi) compared to 6,940 nautical miles (12,850 km; 7,990 mi) for the Mahans.

== Armament ==
The Gridleys introduced an armament of four 5 inch (127 mm) dual purpose guns (anti-surface and anti-aircraft (AA)) in single mounts and sixteen 21 inch (533 mm) torpedo tubes in quadruple mounts for US destroyers. The class was initially equipped with the Mark 11 torpedo or Mark 12 torpedo, which were replaced by the Mark 15 torpedo beginning in 1938. Their near-sisters the Bagleys and Benhams duplicated this armament, the heaviest in torpedoes ever on US destroyers. Compared with the Mahans, they sacrificed one gun for four additional torpedo tubes. It was suggested that these ships could use "curved ahead fire", using the adjustable post-launch gyro angle of their torpedoes to launch a sixteen-torpedo spread ahead of the ship. One reason for the heavy destroyer torpedo armament was that, alone among the major navies, the last nine of the seventeen US Treaty cruisers built in the 1920s and 1930s lacked torpedoes; eventually all of the US Treaty cruisers' torpedoes were removed in 1941 in favor of additional heavy AA guns.

As with most other US destroyers of this period, the 5 inch guns featured all-angle power loading and were director controlled, making them as effective as the technology allowed against aircraft. By late 1942, radio proximity fuses (VT fuses) made them much more effective. As in the last two Mahans, the two forward 5 inch guns were in enclosed mounts, while the after guns were open. However, in common with all US surface combatants in the 1930s, the light AA armament was weak; only four .50 caliber machine guns (12.7 mm) were equipped. It was apparently felt that the heavy AA armament would shoot down most incoming aircraft in all situations, but the attack on Pearl Harbor showed that this was not true. The Gridleys' weak AA armament was partially remedied after Pearl Harbor by replacing the machine guns with seven 20 mm Oerlikon cannon (0.8 in). The Gridleys were alone among the 1930s and 1940s destroyers in not receiving any 40 mm Bofors guns (1.6 in) due to stability concerns. Most of these destroyers had some or all torpedo tubes replaced by light AA guns during World War II, but not the Gridleys.

As with their contemporaries, the Gridleys' anti-submarine warfare (ASW) armament started with two depth charge racks aft. Photographs show that these were augmented during World War II by four K-gun depth charge throwers.

== Service ==
From their completion through mid-World War II, the four Gridleys formed Destroyer Division 11 of Destroyer Squadron 6. Based at Pearl Harbor in 1941, the squadron was at sea escorting USS Enterprise (CV-6) on 7 December 1941, then was dispersed among carrier task forces during the Marshalls-Gilberts raids of early 1942. While Gridley and McCall were sent to the Aleutians in June, Maury was at the battles of the Coral Sea and Midway, and then went to Guadalcanal, where she participated in the Battle of Tassafaronga in November. Craven and McCall escorted convoys to Guadalcanal during this period. The four ships of the class were reunited to screen USS Saratoga (CV-3) for the New Georgia landings in June 1943; then Maury was at the Battle of Kolombangara in July, and with Craven for the Battle of Vella Gulf in August. Maury then received a Presidential Unit Citation for the period 1 February 1942 to 6 August 1943. Gridley and Maury were at the Gilbert Islands/Tarawa invasion in November of that year. All four destroyers operated together in the Marshalls and Marianas campaigns (including the Battle of the Philippine Sea) through mid-1944, and, less Craven (which went to the Atlantic), continued screening escort carriers off the Philippines (including the Battle of Leyte Gulf) and Formosa into 1945.

In 1945, due to their poor suitability for adequate anti-aircraft upgrades, the three ships remaining in the Pacific were withdrawn. Maury, with a crack in her deck that was no longer deemed worth repairing, was decommissioned in October, two months after hostilities ceased. McCall was overhauled at New York but then decommissioned in November. Gridley was overhauled in New York in early 1945, and Craven at Pearl Harbor in late 1944. Both operated in the Atlantic and Mediterranean until January 1946, but then returned to Pearl Harbor where they were decommissioned in 1946. In common with nearly all pre-war US destroyers, all were scrapped by the end of 1948.

== Ships in class ==
Ships of the Gridley destroyer class
Name	Hull no.	Builder	Laid down	Launched	Commissioned	Decommissioned	Fate
Gridley	DD-380	Bethlehem Shipbuilding Corporation, Fore River Shipyard	3 June 1935	1 December 1936	24 June 1937	18 April 1946	Scrapped 1947
Craven	DD-382	Bethlehem Shipbuilding Corporation, Fore River Shipyard	3 June 1935	25 February 1937	2 September 1937	19 April 1946	Scrapped 1947
McCall	DD-400	Bethlehem Shipbuilding Corporation, San Francisco California	17 March 1936	20 November 1937	22 June 1938	30 November 1945	Scrapped 1947
Maury	DD-401	Bethlehem Shipbuilding Corporation, San Francisco California	24 March 1936	14 February 1938	5 August 1938	19 October 1945	Scrapped 1946

== See also ==
- List of destroyer classes of the United States Navy
