= USS Wilson =

Benham-class destroyer

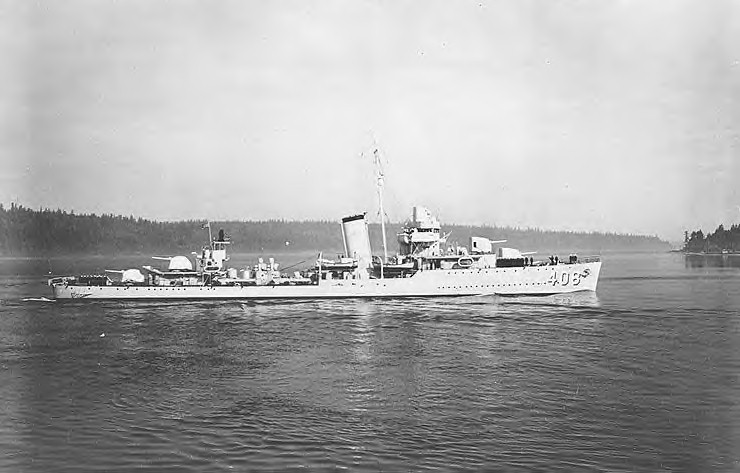

History

United States
- Name: Wilson
- Namesake: Charles Wilson
- Builder: Puget Sound Navy Yard
- Laid down: 22 March 1937
- Launched: 12 April 1939
- Commissioned: 5 July 1939
- Decommissioned: 29 August 1946
- Stricken: 5 April 1948
- Fate: Sunk off Kwajalein on 8 March 1948, after atomic testing

General characteristics
- Class & type: Benham-class destroyer
- Displacement: 2,250 tons (full)
- Length: 340 ft 9 in (103.86 m)
- Beam: 35 ft 6 in (10.82 m)
- Draft: 12 ft 10 in (3.91 m)
- Propulsion: 50,000 shp (37,000 kW); Westinghouse geared turbines; 2 propellers
- Speed: 38.5 knots (71.3 km/h; 44.3 mph)
- Range: 6,500 nmi (12,000 km; 7,500 mi) at 12 knots (22 km/h; 14 mph)
- Complement: 251 officers and enlisted
- Armament: 4 × 5 in (127 mm)/38 guns; 4 × .50 cal (12.7 mm) guns; 16 × 21 in (533 mm) torpedo tubes; 2 × depth charge tracks

USS Wilson (DD-408), was a Benham-class destroyer of the United States Navy.

== Namesake ==
Charles Wilson was born in 1836 in Boston, Massachusetts. He enlisted in the Navy on October 15, 1861, at Chicago, Illinois. Assigned to the gunboat USS Carondelet commanded by Commander Henry A. Walke, he served during the operations which captured Forts Henry and Donelson in February 1862. He exhibited "conspicuous courage under fire" on the night of April 4, 1862, during the flotilla's passage down the Mississippi River past Island No. 10 to New Madrid. During the passage, Wilson, knee-deep in water and exposed to Confederate gunfire stood on the bow of the gunboat as he took soundings and called out the depths of the river, enabling Carondelet to make the passage safely. His soundings were the only significant guide for the gunboat as it threaded its way through the tortuous channel. Walke's running the gauntlet turned out to be a crucial factor in the Union's capture of Island No. 10 and its later operations to the south.

Later that year, Wilson also served during the capture of Confederate batteries opposite Point Pleasant on 6 April and Confederate positions below Madrid on the April 7. He took part in the naval engagement above Fort Pillow on the 10th, in the First Battle of Memphis on June 6, and in the action with the Confederate ram CSS Arkansas on July 15. On January 24, 1863, Walke officially commended Wilson "for the distinguished service." Wilson eventually attained the rank of boatswain.

== History ==
Wilson was laid down on March 22, 1937, at Bremerton, Washington, by the Puget Sound Navy Yard; launched on April 12, 1939; sponsored by Mrs. Edward B. Fenner, the wife of Rear Admiral Edward B. Fenner, the Commandant of the 13th Naval District; and commissioned on July 5, 1939.

Wilson operated along the west coasts of the United States, Central and South America into April 1940, when she went to the Territory of Hawaii to participate in Fleet Problem XXI. In June 1941, after a year mainly spent in the Hawaiian area, Wilson was transferred to the Atlantic. In the last half of that year, and first months of 1942, she served an escort for major fleet units off the U.S. east coast and, in March–May 1942, steamed across the ocean to Iceland and the British Isles.

Wilson returned to the Pacific as part of a task group centered on the aircraft carrier Wasp, and accompanied it to the south Pacific in July 1942. Early in the next month, she provided bombardment and anti-aircraft services to the invasion force during landings at Guadalcanal and Tulagi. While in that area on 9 August, Wilson engaged Japanese cruisers during the Battle of Savo Island, and later rescued survivors of the sunken cruisers Quincy, Astoria and Vincennes.

Following a west coast overhaul, Wilson was back off Guadalcanal in January 1943, in time for the last weeks of the fighting there. She subsequently participated in landings on the Russell Islands, bombarded enemy positions on New Georgia and escorted shipping in and around the Solomon Islands. In November 1943, the destroyer screened U.S. aircraft carriers during strikes on Rabaul and Nauru and was similarly employed during attacks on the Marshall and Caroline Islands in January and February 1944.

In June and July 1944, Wilson served with the carrier task forces during the Marianas Campaign and the Battle of the Philippine Sea, and also fired her guns at small craft and shore targets at Guam. After overhaul work in August–October 1944, she battled enemy suicide planes in late December while escorting a convoy to Mindoro, in the central Philippines. The next month, Wilson again engaged hostile aircraft and shore positions during the Lingayen Gulf invasion. On 16 April 1945, during the campaign for Okinawa, she was hit by a kamikaze, which cost the lives of five of her crewmen and left an unexploded bomb in her after hull. Soon repaired, she served in the Okinawa area until June and operated out of Saipan until the war ended in August.

Wilson was employed on occupation duty until December 1945, when she returned to the U.S. west coast. In May of the next year, she was assigned to Operation Crossroads target duty. Made radioactive by the July atomic bomb tests at Bikini, Wilson was decommissioned in August 1946 and sunk in deep water off Kwajalein on 8 March 1948.

== Honors ==
Wilson received 11 battle stars for her service during World War II
