= USS Ralph Talbot =

Bagley-class destroyer

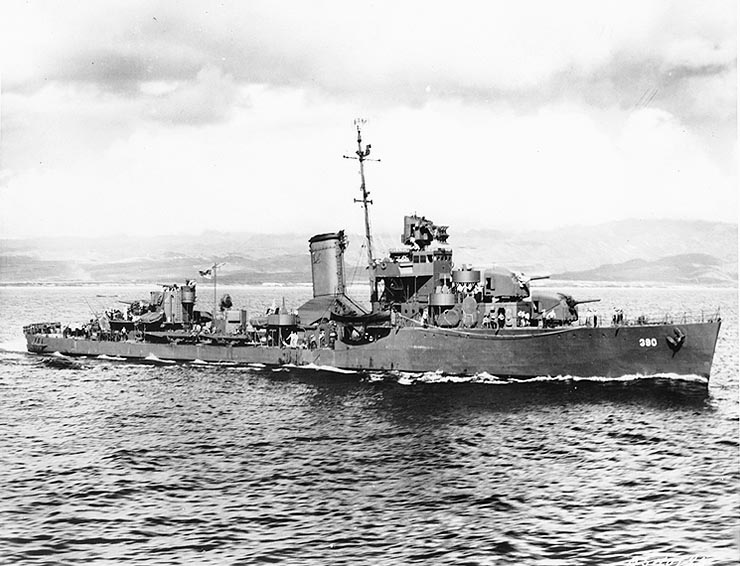
- USS Ralph Talbot (DD-390)

History

United States
- Namesake: Ralph Talbot
- Builder: Boston Navy Yard
- Laid down: 28 October 1935
- Launched: 31 October 1936
- Commissioned: 14 October 1937
- Decommissioned: 29 August 1946
- Stricken: 5 April 1948
- Honours and awards: 14 × battle stars
- Fate: Sunk, 8 March 1948

General characteristics
- Class & type: Bagley-class destroyer
- Displacement: 2,325 tons (2362 t)
- Length: 341 ft 4 in (104.04 m)
- Beam: 35 ft 6 in (10.82 m)
- Draft: 12 ft 10 in (3.91 m) full, 10 ft 4 in (3.15 m) light
- Propulsion: 49,000 shp; 2 propellers
- Speed: 35 kn (65 km/h)
- Range: 6,500 nautical miles (12,000 kilometres); @ 12 kn (22 km/h)
- Complement: 158 Officers and Enlisted
- Armament: 4 × 5"/38 caliber gun (single mounting); 4 × .50 cal (12.7 mm) machine guns; 12 × 21 inch (533 mm) torpedo tubes (quadruple mounting)

USS Ralph Talbot (DD-390) was a Bagley-class destroyer in the United States Navy, named for USMC Second Lieutenant Ralph Talbot (1897–1918), who was awarded the Medal of Honor during World War I. Talbot served in the Pacific Theater during World War II, from the attack on Pearl Harbor through the battle of Okinawa, earning 14 battle stars for her service.

== Launching and pre-war operations ==
Ralph Talbot was laid down at the Boston Navy Yard 28 October 1935; launched 31 October 1936; sponsored by Mrs. Mary Talbot, mother of Lieutenant Talbot; and commissioned 14 October 1937. On 21 September 1938 during the New England Hurricane, the frigate Constitution rammed into the Ralph Talbot after breaking loose.

Prior to the U.S. entry into World War II, Ralph Talbot, assigned to Destroyers, Battle Force, operated in the eastern Pacific. In early 1941, she began a major overhaul at Mare Island Naval Shipyard in Vallejo, California and in April 1941, she rejoined the fleet at San Diego. At midmonth, she steamed to Pearl Harbor whence she operated for the remainder of the year.

== The war begins ==
Moored at Pearl Harbor on the morning of 7 December 1941, the crew of the Ralph Talbot manned her guns and began preparations for getting underway within minutes of the start of the Japanese attack. By 0900 she was en route out of the harbor having already splashed her first enemy aircraft. After the attack, she searched for enemy submarines and, on the 14th, sortied with Task Force 14 (TF 14) on the first of a series of carrier force screening assignments.

== Sailing for the South Pacific ==
In January 1942, she sailed with Task Force 8 during raids against Japanese positions in the Marshalls and Gilberts and in February and March against Wake and Marcus Islands.

Returning to Pearl Harbor with Task Force 16 on 9 March 1942, Ralph Talbot joined Task Force 15 on the 19th and through May escorted convoys between Hawaii and the west coast. In early June, she escorted auxiliaries to the northwest of Hawaii; which refueled and replenished the victors of the Battle of Midway, then escorted TF 16 back to Pearl Harbor. On the 14th she got underway for Australia and New Zealand, and then sailed on 22 July for the Solomons and the first of the island assaults which would eventually lead to victory in the Pacific.

== The Battle of Savo Island ==
Assigned to Task Group 62.6 (TG 62.6), she screened the transport group to Guadalcanal, arriving on the morning of 7 August, then patrolled off the transport area through the landings. On the 8th she took up patrol station north of Savo Island and at 0145 on the 9th received word of three enemy ships inside Savo Island. Soon afterward heavy gunfire was seen to the southeast, the first Battle of Savo Island had begun and Ironbottom Sound was on its way to being named.

Half an hour later Ralph Talbot was shelled by a friendly destroyer, the error was quickly rectified, but within minutes an enemy cruiser appeared off her port quarter. Both ships opened fire and searchlight switches were flicked on. Ralph Talbot's searchlight cables had been severed in the earlier shelling, but the enemy's worked. The spotlighted DD 390 took a hit in the chart house which destroyed radar equipment, cut fire control circuits, and ignited fires. Three more shells came in close succession, hitting the wardroom, the starboard quarter, and the underside of gun Number 4. Among the twelve dead were the Doctor and the Chief Pharmacist's Mate.

At 0221 Ralph Talbot ceased firing. The enemy had disappeared, but the damage she had caused required a new fight. Fire enveloped the bridge and the ship listed heavily to starboard. Slowing to one-third speed, she turned toward Savo. At 0230 all radio communication to and from the vessel ceased, but twenty minutes later she stood in close to the shore where the crew continued the battle to save her. By 0330 fires and flooding were under control and repair work was begun. Soon after 0700 communications were reestablished and by 1210 repairs, including mattress patches on the hull, were sufficient to begin the journey back to the United States for repairs.

== Back in service ==
Arriving at Mare Island 11 September 1942, Ralph Talbot headed west again on 11 November after being repaired. Refresher exercises kept her in Hawaii until mid-December and on the 16th she got underway for Australia.

She arrived at Brisbane on 2 January 1943 and until 10 May conducted training exercises and escorted convoys along the northern and eastern coasts of that continent. On 13 May she arrived at Noumea to provide similar service as Allied forces pushed up the Solomons.

On 30 June she covered the landings on Rendova to commence the New Georgia campaign, rescuing 300 survivors from the McCawley (APA-4) within hours of the completion of the landings. On 5 July she landed 148th Infantry units at Rice Anchorage after softening the landing area with her 5-inch guns. On the 9th and 11th, she participated in the bombardments of Munda and on the night of 12 July joined TG 36.1 in a sweep up the Slot. The Allied ships engaged an enemy cruiser and five destroyers escorting destroyer transports in the Battle of Kolombangara. After that battle, salvage operations on Gwin (DD-433) were frustrated by enemy aerial attacks. Ralph Talbot's torpedoes sent the damaged destroyer to the bottom.

Through August and September and into October, Talbot continued to carry out patrol and escort duties in the Solomons. On 27 October 1943, she sailed again for Australia, then continued on to Milne Bay, arriving 3 November, where antisubmarine and antiaircraft patrol and escort missions continued. At midmonth she returned briefly to Tulagi, then resumed operations off New Guinea. On the night of 29 November, she participated in a Task Force 74 bombardment of Japanese positions on New Britain. In mid-December, she covered the landings at Kiriwina as the Allies secured the Trobriands, then, toward the end of the month returned to New Britain to cover the assault on Cape Gloucester. Through the end of the year, she divided her patrol time between Buna, on the New Guinea mainland, and Cape Gloucester.

== Beginning the New Year ==
On 1 January 1944 she got underway with Task Force 76 for the preinvasion bombardment of, and landings at, Saidor. She next escorted reinforcements to both Saidor and Cape Gloucester. In early February she returned to Milne Bay, then steamed east to the United States for overhaul.

In mid-May she departed San Francisco for Pearl Harbor and a month later sailed for Eniwetok and Saipan as convoy escort. Arriving at Garapan Harbor 5 July, she provided gunfire support to troops ashore, evacuated stranded casualties and on the 7th returned to escort duty in the Marshalls and Marianas. Back at Saipan on the 25th, she provided fire support and harassing shore bombardment fire at Tinian on the 27th, then resumed escort duties. Continuing that duty into August, she joined TF 38.4 at Eniwetok and on the 28th sailed for strikes against the Volcano and Bonin Islands (31 August – 2 September) Yap (7–8 September), and the Palaus (10–19 September).

Following the Palau offensive, the force retired to Manus; then returned to the Palaus, where, in October 1944, they sailed to strike against Japanese shipping and positions on Okinawa, Luzon, and Formosa. On the 14th the force returned to smash targets on Luzon, continuing the raids through the 19th. On the 20th it supported the Leyte landings, then returned to operations off Luzon. On the 24th it steamed north to intercept the Japanese Northern Carrier Force. On the 25th, as Ralph Talbot screened the heavier vessels, the Battle off Cape Engaño was fought and, on the 31st, the force retired to Ulithi.

Ralph Talbot, detached from the fast carriers on 16 November, rejoined the 7th Fleet on the 17th and, with the CVEs of TG 77.4, patrolled the convoy routes in the Leyte Gulf area until the 27th when she steamed to Kossol Roads. On 12 December she returned to Leyte Gulf, then escorted the CVEs into the Sulu Sea for operations in support of the Mindoro landings. A brief respite at Manus followed, preceding her next screening assignment, the Luzon invasion.

Departing the Admiralties 27 December, the destroyer steamed north to Kossol Roads and on 1 January 1945 sortied with the escort carrier group. On the 4th, the Ommaney Bay(CVE-79) was hit by a kamikaze and on the 6th the group arrived off Lingayen Gulf. Through the 17th, the destroyer screened the carriers as they provided air cover for the assault troops and on the 23d she returned to Ulithi to replenish. Reassigned to the 5th Fleet in February, she steamed to Saipan, where she screened transports to Iwo Jima. Between the 16th and the 27th, she patrolled off that island, then returned to Saipan.

Back at Ulithi 5 March, she remained at that base until 20 April when she got underway for Okinawa. Arriving at Hagushi on the 26th, she immediately reported for duty in TG 51.5 and commenced antiaircraft patrols. Soon after 2200, on the 27th, while patrolling off the anchorage, she was closed by two enemy fighters flown by pilots of the "Divine Wind" school. The first crashed into the starboard side aft. The second, a near miss, splashed into the sea off the port quarter. Damage control parties brought flooding under control by 2213 and within minutes PCE-852 pulled alongside, with a medical officer and seven corpsmen. Her casualties were five dead and nine wounded. The destroyer then turned back to Kerama Retto for repairs. On 20 May she got underway to return to the Hagushi anchorage where she again joined the antiaircraft screen. On the 26th she shifted to Nakagusuku Wan, then back to Kerama Retto where she rejoined the escort carriers. A month later she steamed to Leyte, then to Saipan. There she resumed convoy escort duty, and for the remainder of World War II plied between the Marianas and the Ryukyus.

In August, she was busy in the Philippine Sea conducting rescue operations after USS Indianapolis was sunk in that area. She rescued 24 survivors and four days later returned to Ulithi Atoll to continue her service.

On 1 September 1945, Ralph Talbot escorted the USS Portland, sister ship of the Indianapolis and the lead of its class, from Guam to Truk and on the 2nd stood by as the Japanese formally surrendered that island fortress during ceremonies aboard the cruiser. Returning to Guam on the 3rd, the destroyer sailed for Saipan, Okinawa, and Japan on the 5th and, into October, operated off southern Japan and Okinawa, getting underway for the United States on 29 October.

== Battle Stars (participation in military campaigns) ==
1. Pearl Harbor-Midway
2. Pacific Raids - 1942
3. Midway - 3/6 June 1942
4. Guadalcanal-Tulagi Landing including First Savo Island
5. East New Guinea Operations
6. Consolidation of Solomon Islands
7. New Georgia Operations
8. Bismarck Archipelago Operations
9. Marianas Operation
10. West Caroline Operation
11. Leyte Operation
12. Luzon Operation
13. Iwo Jima Operation
14. Okinawa Operation

== Post-war atomic tests ==
Reporting for duty with the Western Sea Frontier on her return 19 November, Ralph Talbot was assigned to Joint Task Force 1 the following May 1946, and designated for use as a target in Operation Crossroads, the atomic tests conducted at Bikini in July and August 1946. Contaminated with nuclear fallout during the tests, the destroyer was towed to Kwajalein where she was decommissioned 29 August 1946 and sunk, in deep water off the atoll, 8 March 1948. Her name was struck from the Navy list 5 April 1948.

== Cultural references ==
During the opening historical sequence of the HBO mini-series The Pacific, the USS Ralph Talbot is shown sailing through rough seas, apparently performing escort duty, based on the ships in the background. On the ship, sailors are seen on deck around the Number 1 and Number 2 gun mounts, manning the AA mounts below the Bridge, and on the starboard bridge wing. The ship's hull number is in war-time, low visibility reduced-size. In the program World War II in Colour, Episode 5, Red Sun Rampant, The Talbot is shown at the 35:36 minute point of the program. In Ken Burns “The War” the Talbot appears at 1:36:59 of disc 1. The appearance context is the embarkation of troops for the North Africa invasion, an apparent error since the Talbot served exclusively in the Pacific theater of operation. In the famed N.B.C. 1952 documentary "Victory At Sea" episode titled "Target Suribachi" the Talbot can again be seen in very heavy seas. This could be the same footage as that viewed in the miniseries "The Pacific".
