= Benham-class destroyer =

Destroyer class of the US Navy

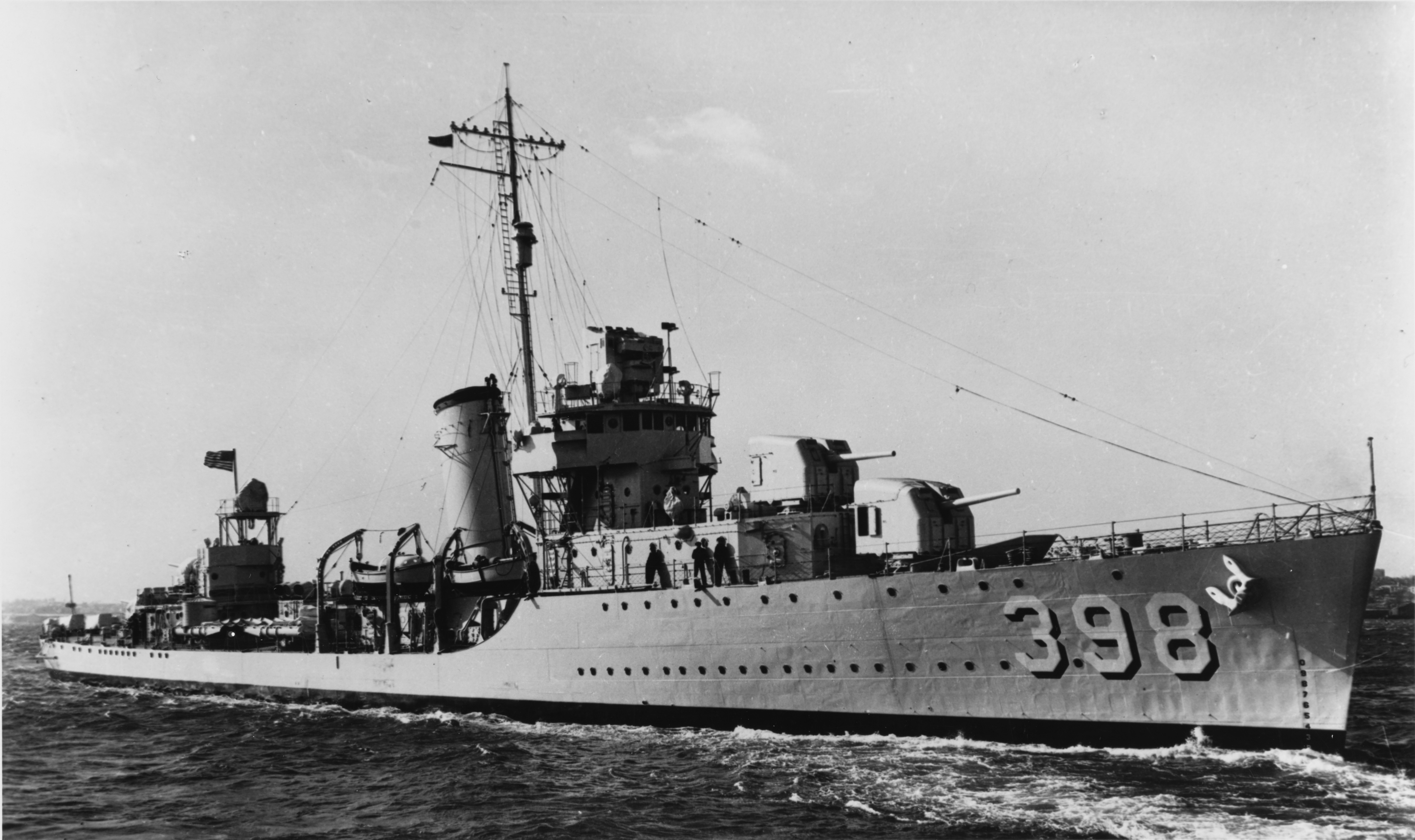
- USS Ellet in February 1939

Class overview
- Name: Benham class
- Builders: Federal Shipbuilding, NJ (3); Boston Navy Yard, MA (2); Norfolk Naval Shipyard, VA (2); Philadelphia Naval Shipyard, PA (1); Charleston Navy Yard, SC (1); Puget Sound Naval SY, WA (1)
- Operators: United States Navy
- Preceded by: Somers class
- Succeeded by: Sims class
- Built: 1936–1939
- In commission: 1939–1946
- Completed: 10
- Lost: 2
- Retired: 8

General characteristics
- Type: Destroyer
- Displacement: 1,656 tons (standard); 1,888 tons (normal); 2,250 tons (full load)
- Length: 340 ft 9 in (103.86 m)
- Beam: 35 ft 6 in (10.82 m)
- Draught: 13 ft 3 in (4.04 m)
- Installed power: 3 Babcock & Wilcox boilers, 2 geared steam turbines, 49,250 shp (36,730 kW) on trials
- Propulsion: 2 shafts
- Speed: 37.9 knots (70.2 km/h; 43.6 mph) on trials
- Range: 5,390 nmi (9,980 km; 6,200 mi) at 12 knots (22 km/h; 14 mph)
- Complement: 9 officers, 175 enlisted (peacetime); 16 officers, 235 enlisted (wartime)
- Sensors & processing systems: Mk33 GFCS; 1 × SC radar
- Armament: As built: 4 × 5"/38 caliber guns; 4 × .50 caliber machine guns; 4 × quad 21-inch torpedo tubes; 2 × Depth charge racks

The Benham class of ten destroyers was built for the United States Navy (USN). They were part of a series of USN destroyers limited to 1,500 tons standard displacement by the London Naval Treaty and built in the 1930s. The class was laid down in 1936–1937 and all were commissioned in 1939. Much of their design was based on the immediately preceding Gridley and Bagley-class destroyers. Like these classes, the Benhams were notable for including sixteen 21-inch (533 mm) torpedo tubes, the heaviest torpedo armament ever on US destroyers. They introduced a new high-pressure boiler that saved space and weight, as only three of the new boilers were required compared to four of the older designs.

The class served extensively in World War II in the Atlantic, Mediterranean, and Pacific theaters, including Neutrality Patrols in the Atlantic 1940–1941. Sterett received the United States Presidential Unit Citation for the Battle of Guadalcanal and the Battle of Vella Gulf, and the Philippine Republic Presidential Unit Citation for her World War II service. Two of the class were lost during World War II, three were scrapped in 1947, while the remaining five ships were scuttled after being contaminated from the Operation Crossroads atomic bomb tests at Bikini Atoll in the Pacific.

== Design ==
The ten Benhams were part of a series of three classes with similar characteristics laid down 1935-1937. The other two were the Gridley class (4 ships) and the Bagley class (8 ships). All three featured four 5-inch (127 mm) dual purpose guns (anti-surface and anti-aircraft) and sixteen 21-inch (533 mm) torpedo tubes in four quadruple mounts as built, the largest number of torpedo tubes on any US destroyers. Although all had only one stack, they differed primarily in their machinery. The Benhams were a Gibbs & Cox design with a new high-pressure boiler design that allowed a reduction from four boilers to three, with an efficient turbine arrangement resembling the Mahans'. The Bagleys were a Navy design that duplicated the machinery of the preceding long-range Mahan class; this led to their prominent boiler uptakes around the single stack that were their main recognition feature. The Gridleys were designed by Bethlehem Shipbuilding Company with advanced high-pressure boilers (also built by Bethlehem) but turbines generally similar to the earlier Farragut class, which limited their range.

=== Engineering ===
Except for the 1850-ton Somers class, the Benhams' propulsion plant was the most advanced yet installed in US destroyers. A new Babcock & Wilcox boiler design was used that allowed a reduction from four boilers to three, saving considerable space and weight. Steam pressure was increased from 400 psi (2,800 kPa) to 600 psi (4,100 kPa) (one reference says 565 psi), superheated to 700 °F (371 °C) as in the Gridleys. Features that improved fuel economy included boiler economizers, double reduction gearing, and cruising turbines. Range was somewhat less than in the Bagleys at 5,390 nmi (9,980 km; 6,200 mi) versus 6,940 nmi (12,850 km; 7,990 mi), possibly due to a smaller fuel capacity of 484 tons versus 504 tons. The main turbines developed 49,250 shp (36,730 kW) on Benham's trials and were manufactured by Westinghouse.

=== Armament ===
The Benhams had the same armament as the Gridleys and Bagleys: four 5-inch/38 caliber dual purpose guns (anti-surface and anti-aircraft (AA)) in single mounts and sixteen 21-inch (533 mm) torpedo tubes in quadruple mounts. The Mark 15 torpedo was equipped. This was the heaviest armament in torpedoes ever on US destroyers. Compared with the Mahans, they sacrificed one gun for four additional torpedo tubes. It was suggested that these ships could use "curved ahead fire", using the adjustable post-launch gyro angle of their torpedoes to launch a sixteen-torpedo spread ahead of the ship. One reason for the heavy destroyer torpedo armament was that, alone among the major navies, the last nine of the seventeen US Treaty cruisers built in the 1920s and 1930s lacked torpedoes; eventually all of the US Treaty cruisers' torpedoes were removed in 1941 in favor of additional heavy AA guns.

As with most other US destroyers of this period, the 5-inch guns featured all-angle power loading and were director controlled, making them as effective as the technology allowed against aircraft. By late 1942, radio proximity fuses (VT fuses) made them much more effective. As in the last two Maurys, the two forward 5-inch guns were in enclosed mounts, while the after guns were open. However, in the Benhams, the after two mounts were a Mark 30 Mod 1 base-ring type with an integral ammunition hoist fed from a handling room below each gun, as in an enclosed mount. This allowed some of the class to be fitted with an enclosure for No. 4 gun and an open-top shield for No. 3 gun while on Neutrality Patrol in the Atlantic in 1941; but the shields were removed later to save weight for light anti-aircraft armament. In common with all US surface combatants in the 1930s, the as-built light AA armament was weak; only four .50 caliber machine guns (12.7 mm) were equipped. It was apparently felt that the heavy AA armament would shoot down most incoming aircraft in all situations, but the attack on Pearl Harbor showed that this was not true.

While on Neutrality Patrol, some of the class landed their after torpedo tube mounts and .50-caliber machine guns so that their Depth charge and light AA batteries could be increased; photographs show six Oerlikon 20 mm cannon were added along with four K-gun depth charge throwers and, reportedly, a Y-gun on some ships. These ships later received two twin 40 mm Bofors mounts on their after deckhouses before being transferred to the Pacific. In 1945, Lang, Sterett, and Wilson also landed their remaining torpedo tubes and after 5-inch gun shields in favor of a total of four 40 mm twin mounts and four 20 mm twin mounts.

== Service ==
This class, except Benham and Ellet, served on Neutrality Patrols in the Atlantic and escort duty in the Atlantic and Mediterranean as Destroyer Squadron 8 (with Wainwright as flagship) from April 1940 to December 1941. Benham and Ellet were at sea in the Pacific on 7 December 1941 with Dunlap and Fanning of the Mahan class as Destroyer Division (DesDiv) 12 (part of Destroyer Squadron (DesRon) 6, with Balch as flagship). Later, this four-ship division escorted the aircraft carrier Enterprise during the Doolittle Raid on Japan.

In June 1942, while DesDiv 15 (Lang, Stack, Sterett and Wilson) escorted the aircraft carrier Wasp to the Pacific, DesDiv 16 (Mayrant, Trippe, Rhind, and Rowan) remained in the Atlantic, supporting the Operation Torch landings in North Africa in December 1942. In 1943 they served off Italy, where Mayrant was badly damaged by a German air attack off Palermo and Rowan sunk by an E-boat (torpedo boat) attack off Salerno.

Meanwhile, the six Pacific destroyers operated in the Solomon Islands (where Ellet was ordered to sink the Australian heavy cruiser Canberra after the Battle of Savo Island), and were on hand for the Naval Battle of Guadalcanal, 13–15 November 1942, in which Sterett was badly damaged and Benham sunk. Lang, Sterett, and Stack formed division "A-2" at the Battle of Vella Gulf in 1943 and, thereafter, all five remaining ships accompanied the advance through the Marshalls and Marianas. Reassigned as DesDiv 4 of DesRon 2, the former DesDiv 15 ships were at Leyte and later Okinawa; Ellet was at Iwo Jima. In April 1945, Sterett and Wilson were both damaged in kamikaze attacks while on radar picket duty; Wilson remained in service while Sterett returned to service as the war ended. Sterett, Ellet, and Lang were scrapped in 1947. The others, contaminated as targets in the Operation Crossroads atomic bomb tests, were decommissioned and scuttled in deep water off Kwajalein in 1948.

Sterett earned 12 battle stars, the United States Presidential Unit Citation for the Battle of Guadalcanal and the Battle of Vella Gulf, and the Philippine Republic Presidential Unit Citation for her World War II service.

== Ships in class ==
Ships of the Benham destroyer class
Name	Hull no.	Builder	Laid down	Launched	Commissioned	Decommissioned	Fate
Benham	DD-397	Federal Shipbuilding	1 September 1936	16 April 1938	2 February 1939	—N/a	Torpedoed by Japanese at Naval Battle of Guadalcanal 15 November 1942, scuttled by Gwin
Ellet	DD-398	Federal Shipbuilding	3 December 1936	11 June 1938	17 February 1939	29 October 1945	Sold for scrap 1 August 1947
Lang	DD-399	Federal Shipbuilding	5 April 1937	28 August 1938	30 March 1939	16 October 1945	Sold for scrap 31 October 1947
Mayrant	DD-402	Boston Navy Yard	15 April 1937	14 May 1938	13 September 1939	28 August 1946	Damaged during Operation Crossroads atomic tests at Bikini Atoll, July 1946. Scuttled off Kwajalein, 4 April 1948
Trippe	DD-403	Boston Navy Yard	15 April 1937	14 May 1938	1 November 1939	28 August 1946	Damaged during Operation Crossroads atomic tests at Bikini Atoll, July 1946. Scuttled off Kwajalein, 3 February 1948
Rhind	DD-404	Philadelphia Naval Shipyard	22 September 1937	28 July 1938	10 November 1939	26 August 1946	Damaged during Operation Crossroads atomic tests at Bikini Atoll, July 1946. Scuttled off Kwajalein, 22 March 1948
Rowan	DD-405	Norfolk Navy Yard	25 June 1937	5 May 1938	23 September 1939	—N/a	Torpedoed by German E-boats while on convoy duty between Salerno and Oran 11 September 1943
Stack	DD-406	Norfolk Navy Yard	25 June 1937	5 May 1938	20 November 1939	29 August 1946	Damaged during Operation Crossroads atomic tests at Bikini Atoll, July 1946. Sunk as target off Kwajalein, 24 April 1948
Sterett	DD-407	Charleston Navy Yard	2 December 1936	27 October 1938	15 August 1939	2 November 1945	Sold for scrap 10 August 1947
Wilson	DD-408	Puget Sound Navy Yard	22 March 1937	12 April 1939	5 July 1939	29 August 1946	Damaged during Operation Crossroads atomic tests at Bikini Atoll, July 1946. Scuttled off Kwajalein, 8 March 1948

== See also ==
- Gridley-class destroyer
- Bagley-class destroyer
- List of destroyer classes of the United States Navy
- List of United States Navy losses in World War II
- List of ship classes of World War II
