= USS Sterett (DD-407) =

Benham-class destroyer

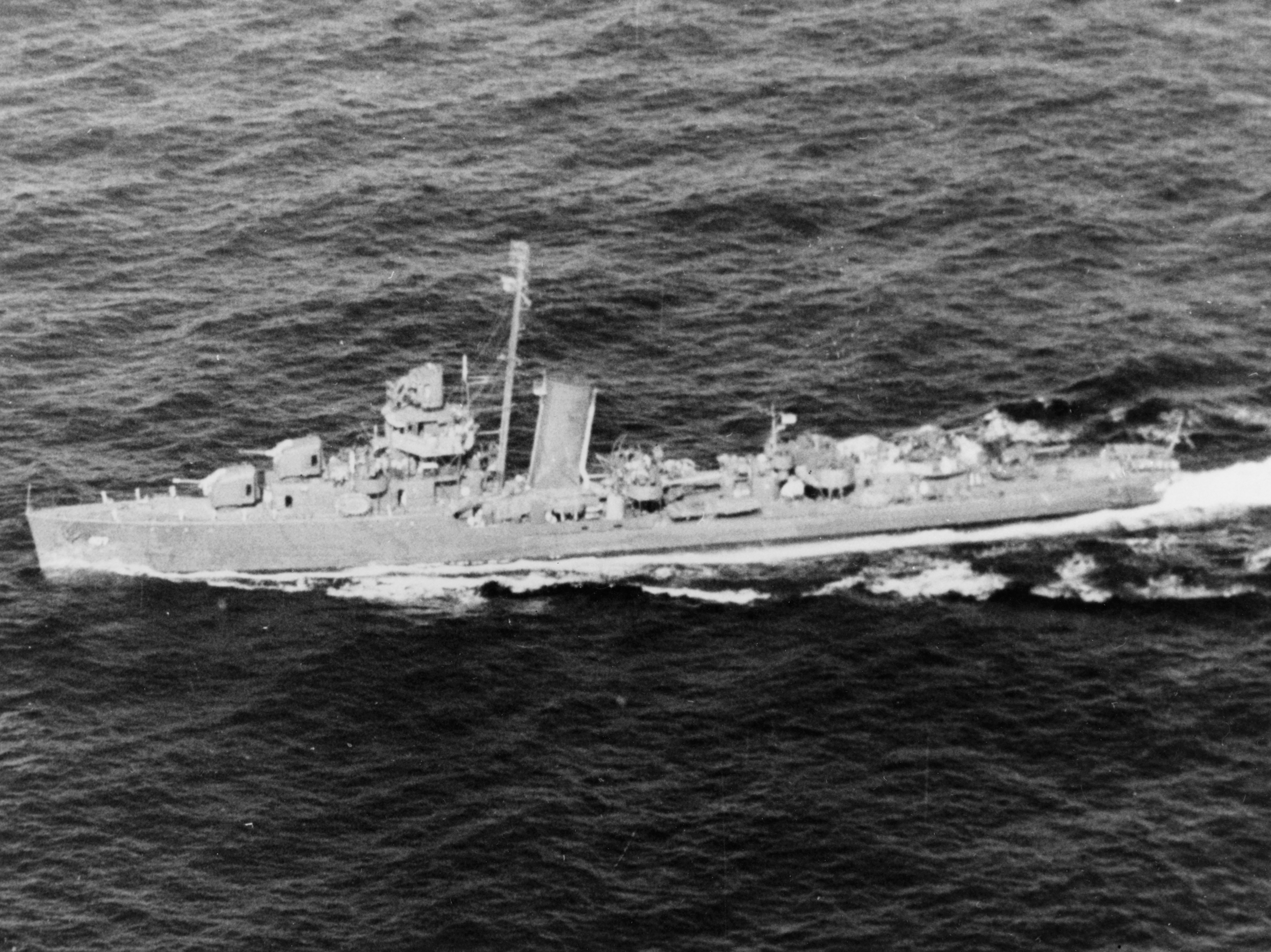
- Sterett

History

United States
- Builder: Charleston Navy Yard
- Laid down: 2 December 1936
- Launched: 27 October 1938
- Commissioned: 15 August 1939
- Decommissioned: 2 November 1945
- Stricken: 25 February 1947
- Fate: Sold 10 August 1947

General characteristics
- Class & type: Benham-class destroyer
- Displacement: 1500 tons
- Length: 341 ft 3 5/8 in
- Beam: 35 ft 6 1/8 in
- Draught: 17 ft 8 in (5.38 m)
- Speed: 40.7 kt
- Complement: 251
- Armament: four 5-inch 38 caliber; four 40 mm; eight 21 inch (533 mm) tt

USS Sterett (DD-407) was a Benham-class destroyer in the United States Navy. She was the second Navy ship named for Andrew Sterett.

The Sterett was laid down on 2 December 1936 at the Charleston Navy Yard; launched on 27 October 1938; sponsored by Mrs. Camilla Ridgely Simpson; and commissioned on 15 August 1939.

== Pre-war years ==
The Sterett departed from Charleston, South Carolina on 28 October 1939 in company with two other newly commissioned destroyers, Mustin and Hughes, for shakedown in the Gulf of Mexico. She visited Veracruz, Cristóbal, Mobile, and Guantanamo Bay before returning to Charleston on 20 December. She underwent post-shakedown overhaul and trials at Charleston until departing on 4 May 1940. Assigned to Destroyer Division 15, Sterett rendezvoused with Hammann at Guantanamo Bay, and the two destroyers steamed for San Diego via the Panama Canal. They arrived in San Diego on 23 May; and, for a month, Sterett divided her time between training and plane-guarding Enterprise. On 24 June, she sailed for Hawaii with Enterprise and five other destroyers, and arrived at Pearl Harbor on 2 July.

She operated out of Pearl Harbor for the next 10 months, participating in a number of exercises and patrols. When Mississippi exited Pearl Harbor on 14 May 1941, the Sterett was in her screen. The warships transited the Panama Canal and arrived at Norfolk on 28 June. Sterett next screened the USS Long Island during the escort carrier's Bermuda shakedown cruise. Sterett concluded 1941 engaged in neutrality patrols with the Wasp.

== World War II ==
After the Japanese attack on Pearl Harbor, the Sterett steamed from Bermuda with the Wasp and an assortment of cruisers and destroyers to counter possible action by Vichy French ships anchored at Martinique.

== 1942 ==
The Sterett spent the early months of the war patrolling off the eastern seaboard. In mid-January, she steamed to the Naval Station Argentia, Newfoundland, to meet Task Force 15 (TF 15) and escort a convoy to Iceland. The convoy was transferred to two British destroyers on 23 January 1942, and she entered Hvalfjörður, Iceland, on the 26th. The Sterett returned to the United States at New York City on 9 February, and she departed on the 15th to meet the passenger liner RMS Queen Mary off the Boston breakwater and escort her into the harbor. After two trips between Boston and Casco Bay, Maine, the Sterett joined the USS Wasp as part of her escort to duty with the British Home Fleet. The task group entered Scapa Flow, Orkney Islands, on 4 April.

While the Wasp made her first aerial reinforcement of the embattled Malta, the Sterett operated with the British Fleet out of Scapa Flow. The destroyer was with the Wasp on her second run to Malta, 29 April to 15 May, and after returning to Scapa Flow, she headed for the United States. The task group arrived at Norfolk, Virginia on 27 May 1942. On 5 June, the Sterett steamed for San Diego, where she arrived on 19 June. She steamed out again on 1 July and, as a part of Task Force 18, steamed via Tongatapu to the Fiji Islands. She was assigned to Rear Admiral Richmond K. Turner's South Pacific Amphibious Expeditionary Force and practiced invasion techniques in the Fiji Islands until 1 August 1942.

The Sterett spent the rest of 1942 and all of 1943 supporting the Allied forces as they struggled up the island staircase formed by the Solomon Islands and the Bismarck Archipelago. The Solomons invasion fleet, guarded by three carrier task groups led by the Saratoga, the Enterprise, and the Wasp, arrived in the Solomons late on 6 August. The 1st Marine Division then landed at Guadalcanal. Meanwhile, the Sterett and the Wasp carrier group zigzagged into a rain squall, successfully dodging an 18-plane raid launched from Rabaul on New Britain Island.

For the next three days, the Wasp unit guarded the supply lines to Tulagi. Next, the Sterett steamed east of San Cristobal to screen the USS Long Island while she launched 31 Marine planes for the defense of Guadalcanal. Rejoining the Wasp immediately, the Sterett remained with her until DesDiv 15 was detached on 10 September 1942.

For the next month, the Sterett escorted convoys and reinforcements to the Solomon Islands. Following duty escorting the Bellatrix and the Betelgeuse to Espiritu Santo in the New Hebrides, and guarding the latter all the way to Nouméa, New Caledonia, she returned to Guadalcanal accompanying two transports, the McCawley and the Zeilin, loaded with troops and equipment. While the transports unloaded, the Sterett fired on enemy bombers and shore batteries harassing Henderson Field.

The Sterett returned to the New Hebrides and, after refueling, put to sea on 31 October to protect still more reinforcements to Guadalcanal. The Sterett covered the establishment of the beachhead and later she joined the San Francisco and the Helena in a bombardment of Japanese positions near Koli Point. Two days later, she retired to Espiritu Santo.

=== Naval Battle of Guadalcanal ===
At Espiritu Santo, the Sterett met another convoy and escorted it to Lunga Point, Guadalcanal. As the troops were landing on the morning of 12 November, the Sterett took up station to meet expected air raids. Just after noon, she received word that a large formation of Japanese planes had been spotted by a coastwatcher on Buin, Papua New Guinea. In less than an hour, the attackers swooped in low against the dark background of Tulagi and Florida Island. The Sterett, directly in the line of the Japanese approach, shot down four torpedo bombers while dodging at least three torpedoes. By 14:50, 32 of the Japanese were downed by antiaircraft fire and American aircraft.

That evening, after shepherding the transports east to safety, the Sterett joined the van of the cruiser-destroyer force under the command of Rear Admiral Daniel J. Callaghan and steamed back through Lengo Channel to intercept Vice Admiral Hiroaki Abe's Japanese Navy task force. The Sterett and the other in the van, followed by five cruisers and a rear guard of four more destroyers, passed Lunga Point abeam, increased speed and, upon reaching a point about three miles (6 km) north of Tassafaronga, changed course. As the warships sped toward Savo Island, their radar screens were dotted by echoes from the Japanese ships. The Helena reported first contact at 01:30 on the 13th, and soon all the American ships were receiving reflections from the Japanese ships. The two forces were closing each other at a combined speed in excess of 40 knots (75 km/h).

The American warships threaded their way into the Japanese formation, and a deadly crossfire immediately engulfed the Sterett. At 01:50, Admiral Callaghan ordered odd ships in column to open fire to starboard and even ships to engage the enemy to port. The Sterett fired on the light cruiser Nagara to starboard, damaging Nagara with a single 5-inch (127 mm) shell hit.

At this point, the battle degenerated into a chaotic maelstrom of individual duels at very short range, with accurate “friend-or-foe” identification extremely difficult due to darkness, smoke, and a lack of radar. The Sterett attacked Hiei at a range of roughly 2,000 yards, launching four torpedoes at 0204, and peppering her superstructure with 5-inch shells. Two of the torpedoes struck Hiei starboard under turret #3 at 02:08, but did not explode (RV Patrel exploration in 2019 confirmed the hits). Sterett then claimed a torpedo hit on the destroyer between her and Hiei, but while it thought it was a Japanese destroyer, Sterett actually observed USS Laffey being struck by a torpedo fired from the Japanese destroyer Yukikaze which blew off her stern.

At 02:15, Sterett spotted the Japanese destroyer Yūdachi, which signaled her under the belief she was a friendly Japanese ship. Sterett promptly blasted Yūdachi, shell hits from Sterett punched through Yūdachi's boiler rooms, leaving her dead in the water and adrift, and lead to the crew abandoning ship and enact a failed scuttling attempt. (the crippled Yūdachi was later located by the heavy cruiser USS Portland, which proceeded to finish her off, observing Yūdachi beginning to capsize by her 6th salvo). (Note: Some sources state Sterett crippled Yūdachi with a torpedo hit and not gunfire)

However, just moments later, Sterett was ambushed by the Yukikaze, which had finished sinking Laffey and was sweeping for additional targets, prompting Yukikaze to pounce on the off guard Sterett, which was hit by eleven 5-inch (127 mm) shells. Author and torpedo commander of the USS Sterett Thomas O McWhorter wrote in the book Stand and Fight: (Note: American sources often credit the destroyer Teruzuki for crippling Sterett, but Japanese records indicate Teruzuki's contributions to the battle were far less extensive than American historians often make out, with Teruzuki being attributed for many of the actions which Yukikaze actually performed due to the latter's ambiguous records)

The Sterett took eleven direct hits, all on her port side, all above the waterline, and sustained severe shrapnel damage from many near misses. Her after deck house and number three gun, an unshielded open mount back aft, were engulfed by flames that brightly illuminated the flag on the small ship's mainmast truck. Her after handling rooms were set afire, causing powder in the ready service storage to ignite ... Twenty-eight men were dead, another thirteen seriously wounded. Four leaped overboard to extinguish their burning clothes. Those who stayed aboard and saved the ship braved burning compartments to turn flood valves and remove wounded from impossible places. They defied smoke to soak powder, grid bulkheads, patch holes, fix pumps, run hoses, and keep electricity flowing. They allowed their hands to melt while connected superheated brass hose couplings to fight fires.

At 02:30, with the Japanese retiring toward Savo Island, Sterett, her after guns and starboard torpedo tubes out of commission, began to withdraw. She had difficulty overtaking the rest of her force because of her damaged steering gear and the necessity to reduce speed periodically to control the blaze on her after deck. By dawn, she was back in formation on the starboard quarter of the San Francisco.

Before heading for Espiritu Santo on the 13th, she delivered her parting shot by depth-charging a sound contact, possibly the submarine which, about an hour later, would sink the Juneau. Sterett arrived at Espiritu Santo on 14 November, underwent emergency repairs, and departed from Espiritu Santo on 18 November, arriving in Nouméa, New Caledonia on 20 November. On 24 November, she departed for Pearl Harbor, arriving there on 4 December. She then steamed into San Francisco Bay on 11 December and entered the Mare Island Naval Shipyard, where she remained for two months. Sterett steamed from San Francisco on 10 February 1943, joined the Nassau at Pearl Harbor, and together they reached Espiritu Santo on 3 March. Sterett departed Espiritu Santo on 8 March and resumed her original assignment – guarding convoys to the Solomons-Bismarcks area and patrolling the area to prevent enemy reinforcements from being moved into the fray.

== 1943 ==
On 6 August 1943, Sterett was steaming in "Ironbottom Sound" in the second division of the six-destroyer task group under Commander Frederick Moosbrugger. At 12:00, air reconnaissance reported an enemy force of four destroyers delivering troops and supplies to Kolombangara via Vella Gulf. At dusk, the six Americans passed cautiously through Gizo Strait into Vella Gulf. By midnight, the two divisions were skirting the coast of Kolombangara about two miles (4 km) apart. Radar picked up the Japanese ships heading south at about 30 knots (55 km/h). One division launched eight torpedoes at the Japanese column's port side; then Sterett's division loosed their torpedoes and opened with their guns. Three of the four Japanese destroyers took torpedo hits and received fire from 5-inch guns. Shigure, the lone survivor, retreated at high speed to Buin. At Vella Gulf, Sterett and her comrades accounted for three destroyers, over 1,500 sailors and soldiers, and a large portion of the 50 tons of supplies.

For the rest of August and throughout September, Sterett occupied herself with patrols in the Solomons. On 8 October, she arrived in Sydney, Australia, escorting the light cruiser Cleveland. The two warships returned to Espiritu Santo on the 24th. At the beginning of November, she accompanied the assault forces to Bougainville, Solomon Islands; and between 5 and 11 November, she supported the carriers while their planes bombed Japanese ships at Rabaul. She screened the carriers that delivered the 9 December air raid on Nauru Island; then she withdrew to the New Hebrides until 27 December 1943. In the Solomons on the last three days of 1943, the Sterett escorted the Alabama to Pearl Harbor and on to the Ellice Islands, arriving at Funafuti on 21 January 1944. Two days afterward, she put to sea with the Bunker Hill and the Monterey.

== 1944 ==
From 29 January to 7 March 1944, Sterett operated in the Marianas and Marshalls. On the 29th, her carriers' planes struck Roi and Namur islands of Kwajalein Atoll. Next came the 12 February raid on Truk. Five days later, Sterett covered the flattops during raids on Tinian and Saipan. She departed the Marshalls for the New Hebrides, where she joined the Emirau invasion force. Sterett stopped at Purvis Bay, Florida Island, on 4 April and visited Efate on 7 April during her voyage from Emirau Island to the United States.

Sterett stopped at Pearl Harbor on 16 and 17 April and arrived at the Puget Sound Navy Yard on the 29th. She underwent yard work from 24 to 30 April and then moved down the coast on 3 May to San Francisco Bay. Forty-eight hours later, she sailed out for Oahu and reached Pearl Harbor on the 10th. Following 14 days of exercises in the Hawaiian Islands, she sortied with Task Group 12.1 (TG 12.1) for the Marshalls. At Majuro from 30 May, she exited the lagoon with TF 58 on 6 June to screen the support carriers during the invasion of the Marianas. Sterett cruised with the carriers from 11 to 25 June as they launched and recovered wave after wave of planes for strikes on Saipan, Iwo Jima, Guam, and Rota Islands, periodically fending off Japanese aerial retaliation.

From 25 June until 7 July, she patrolled the waters around Guam and Rota and bombarded Guam. After covering the carriers during the sweeps over Yap, Palau, and Ulithi, she sailed for Eniwetok en route to Puget Sound. She stopped at Pearl Harbor from 10 to 14 August and headed on to Bremerton, Washington, entering the Puget Sound Navy Yard on the 20th. Completing overhaul and trials up and down the west coast, she sailed west on 13 October for the Hawaiian Islands. Sterett sortied from Oahu with Task Unit 16.8.5 (TU 16.8.5) on 19 November and, 12 days later, entered Seeadler Harbor, Manus, Admiralty Islands. Two weeks before Christmas 1944, she entered Leyte Gulf in the Philippines for patrol and convoy duty.

On the day after Christmas, she started for Mindoro with a supply convoy. Two days later, the Japanese attacked. Early that morning, three kamikazes dove at Sterett's convoy. Antiaircraft fire downed the first, but the second and third succeeded in crashing into merchantmen. Sterett endured the onslaught of the "Divine Wind" until the task unit was dissolved on New Year's Day 1945. On that date, she returned to San Pedro Bay, claiming the destruction of one plane for herself and assists in eliminating two others. During the next three months, Sterett plied the waters of the South and Central Pacific, primarily engaged in patrol and convoy duty in the Solomons.

== 1945 ==
On 1 April 1945, she was off Okinawa, serving as a radar picket ship. At Okinawa, Japan hurled a storm of suicide planes at the Navy. Particularly hard-hit were the ships on radar picket duty. On 6 April, the Sterett was sent to accompany her companion ship, the Bennett, to Okinawa after that destroyer had been hit by a kamikaze.

Three days later, the Sterett suffered the same fate. While at picket station No. 4 northeast of Okinawa, five enemy planes swooped on her, and the LCS-36 and LCS-24. The first was driven off and later downed; the second was shot down by the destroyer's main battery; but the third, though battered by her barrage, pressed home its attack and smashed into the Sterett's starboard side at her waterline. She lost all electrical power, but her 20 millimeter and 40 millimeter guns still managed to bring down the fourth attacker. The destroyer lost steering control and the power to all guns and directors; her communications were out; and her forward fuel tanks were ruptured. However, with the shipboard fires under control, steering control reestablished aft, and emergency communication lines rigged, she moved off to Kerama Retto with the Jeffers providing antiaircraft cover.

Following emergency repairs at Kerama Retto, she screened TU 53.7.1 to Ulithi; and from there, she and the USS Rail (DE-304) steamed to Pearl Harbor. After spending the period from 1 to 10 May at Pearl Harbor, she moved on to Bremerton, Washington, and more extensive repairs. Through the months of June, July, and August 1945, she remained on the West Coast. Then, from 21 to 28 August, the Sterett steamed to Pearl Harbor again. Upon her arrival, she practiced shore bombardment and antiaircraft gunnery for a month. On 25 September, she steamed away with the Mississippi, the North Carolina, and the Enterprise.

== Decommissioning ==
Sterett transited the Panama Canal on 8 and 9 October and, after a three-day stay in Coco Solo, she proceeded north. She arrived in New York City on 17 October, and she was decommissioned there on 2 November 1945. Her name was stricken from the Navy List on 25 February 1947, and she was sold on 10 August to the Northern Metal Company of Philadelphia for scrapping.

The Sterett earned 12 battle stars, the United States Presidential Unit Citation for the Battle of Guadalcanal and the Battle of Vella Gulf, and the Philippine Republic Presidential Unit Citation for her World War II service.
