= USS Maury (DD-401) =

Gridley-class destroyer

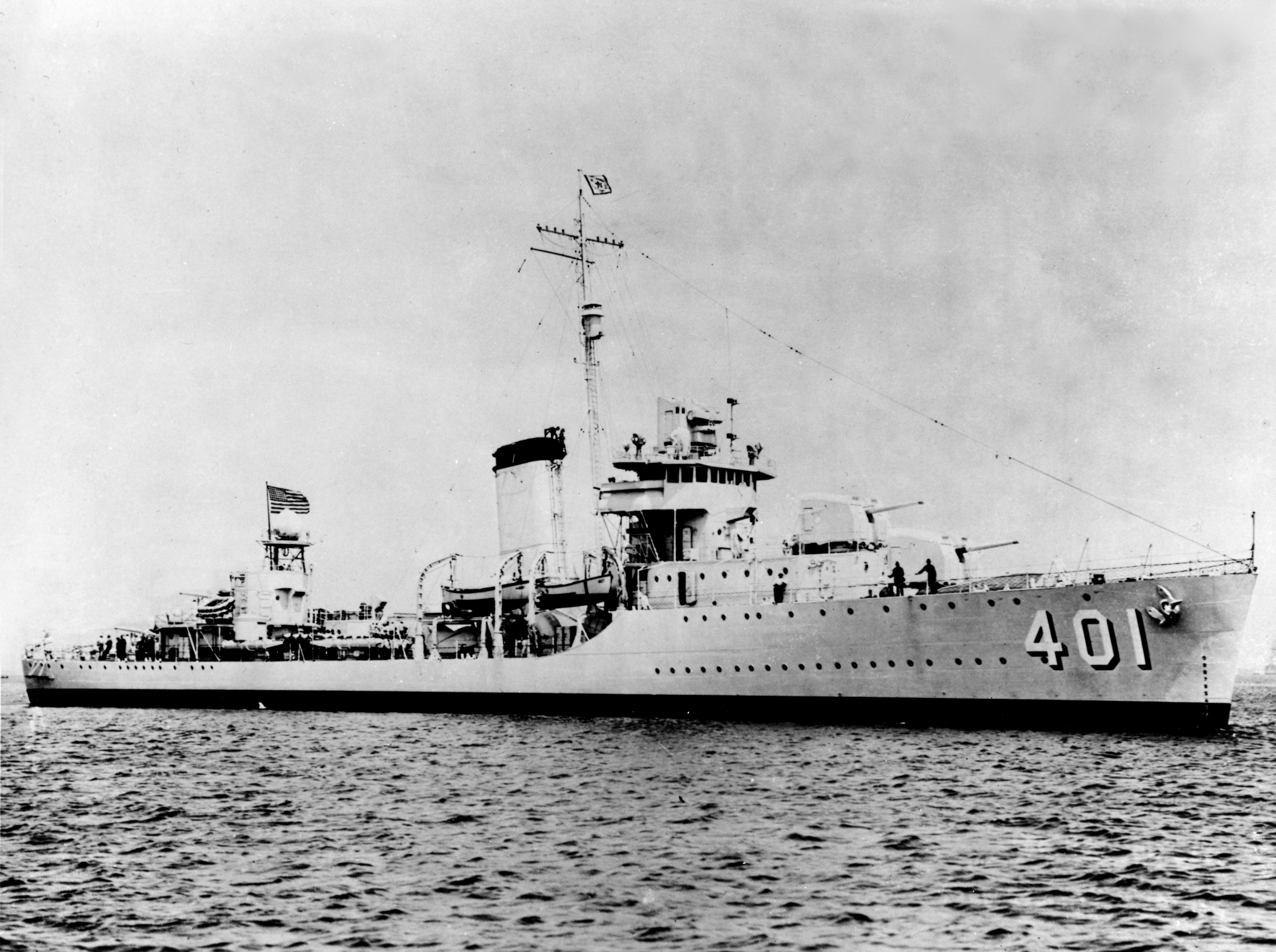
- USS Maury when first completed in mid-1938

History

United States
- Name: Maury
- Namesake: Matthew Fontaine Maury
- Builder: Union Plant, Bethlehem Shipbuilding Corporation, San Francisco, California
- Laid down: 24 March 1936
- Launched: 14 February 1938
- Commissioned: 5 August 1938
- Decommissioned: 19 October 1945
- Stricken: 1 November 1945
- Identification: DD-401
- Honors and awards: 16 battle stars; Presidential Unit Citation
- Fate: Sold for scrapping, 13 June 1946

General characteristics
- Class & type: Gridley-class destroyer
- Displacement: 1,500 tons
- Length: 341 ft 4 in (104.04 m)
- Beam: 35 ft 10 in (10.92 m)
- Draft: 14 ft 4 in (4.37 m)
- Propulsion: 50,000 shp (37,000 kW) Bethlehem geared turbines, 2 screws
- Speed: 36.5 knots (67.6 km/h; 42.0 mph)
- Range: 5,000 nmi (9,300 km; 5,800 mi) at 20 kn (37 km/h; 23 mph)
- Complement: 176
- Armament: 4 × 5 in (127 mm)/38 cal. guns; 16 × 21 inch (533 mm) torpedo tubes

The second USS Maury (DD-401) was a Gridley-class destroyer in the United States Navy. She was named for Matthew Maury, and was one of the most decorated US Naval vessels of World War II.

== History ==
Maury was laid down on 24 March 1936 by Union Plant, Bethlehem Shipbuilding Corporation, San Francisco, California, and launched on 14 February 1938; sponsored by Miss Virginia Lee Maury Werth, granddaughter of Commander Maury. The ship was commissioned on 5 August 1938. On speed trials, Maury reached 42.8 knots, far in excess of her design speed of 36.5 knots and the highest speed ever achieved by a U.S. Navy destroyer.

Assigned to the Pacific Fleet after commissioning, Maury was operating out of Pearl Harbor when the United States entered World War II. She was steaming with the aircraft carrier Enterprise en route to Hawaii from TF 8 operations near Wake Island, when word of the Japanese attack on Pearl Harbor reached her soon after 0900, 7 December 1941. The ship went to general quarters as the force began an unsuccessful search for the Japanese Fleet. By the time the force returned to Pearl Harbor only one enemy vessel had been sighted and sunk, by carrier aircraft, the submarine I-70 on 10 December. For the remainder of 1941, Maury, in the screen of Enterprise, stayed in the Hawaiian area to guard against a follow-up attack by the Japanese.

=== 1942–43 ===
With the new year, 1942, the Japanese advanced south and east through the islands of the southwest Pacific and Maury, with Enterprise and Yorktown, headed in that direction for raids on Japanese installations on Maleolap Atoll, Taroa, and Reuters Islands. Striking on 1 February, the carrier forces and bombardment groups completed their missions despite heavy aerial resistance and were back at Pearl Harbor on 5 February. On 15 February, the force, now designated TF 16, got underway for Wake and Marcus Islands against which they launched surprise attacks 24 February and 4 March, respectively, returning to Oahu 10 March. There through April she conducted antisubmarine and antiaircraft exercises and served with the offshore patrol.

On 30 April TF 16, with Maury in the screen of the heavier ships, sortied from Pearl Harbor to aid Yorktown and Lexington in the Battle of the Coral Sea. Reaching the scene after the battle was over, the force returned to Hawaii, arriving 26 May. Two days later they sortied again, this time for Midway Island to repulse an expected assault on that base. On 2 June, having rendezvoused with Task Force 17 (TF 17), they were in position 350 miles north east of Midway. On 4 June the Battle of Midway commenced as Japanese carrier aircraft flew against installations on the island. By 7 June the American forces had sunk four Japanese carriers and one cruiser at the cost of destroyer Hammann and carrier Yorktown.

After Midway the force remained at Pearl Harbor for a month before departing once again for the South Pacific. Steaming via the Tonga Islands, the force headed for the Japanese-held Solomon Islands. By 7 August they were 40 miles from the target, Guadalcanal. During the ensuing Tulagi-Guadalcanal landing operations, Maury served as plane guard for Enterprise as she carried out continuous flight operations in support of the assault troops. The destroyer remained in the Solomons area through the Battle of the Eastern Solomons, 24 and 25 August. In that battle, which prevented Japanese reinforcements from reaching Guadalcanal, Enterprise, among others, was severely damaged and TF 16 was ordered to retire to the Tonga Islands, from which they returned to Pearl Harbor, arriving 10 September. On 26 October the force was back in the South Pacific when an enemy force, including carriers, was sighted. Battle was engaged off Santa Cruz and once again Japanese reinforcements were turned back, with one U.S. carrier damaged, Enterprise, and one lost, Hornet.

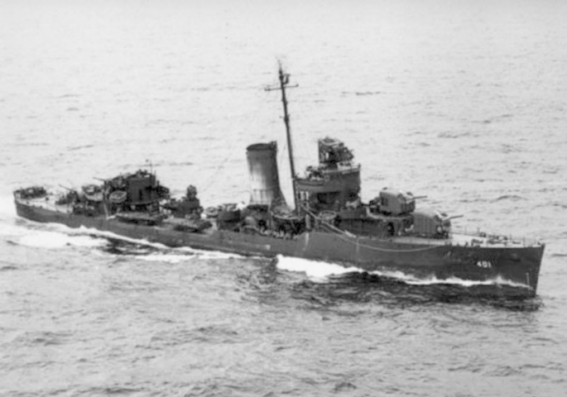
Maury underway in 1943.

Maury spent the next 10 months in the Solomons area as part of Destroyer Division 11. Operating from Nouméa and Espiritu Santo, she cruised on antisubmarine patrols and escorted carriers and convoys as American forces dug in on Guadalcanal and moved on against Munda, Rendova, Russell, Vella Lavella, and New Georgia. Maury's most important service during this period came as a unit of Captain Frederick Moosbrugger's Task Group 31.2 at the Battle of Vella Gulf on the night of 6–7 August 1943, where Maury, along with Dunlap and Craven, launched a surprise torpedo attack that sank Japanese destroyers Hagikaze, Arashi, and Kawakaze, the first US Navy victory in a night torpedo engagement. At the end of August 1943, she departed for San Pedro and a 6-week availability period, returning to the combat area with TF 52 to support the invasions of Tarawa and Makin in the Gilbert Islands 20 November 1943.

=== 1944 ===
Early in 1944 Maury joined TF 58, the fast carrier force, and put out to sea 19 January to screen the carriers as their planes raided Wotje, Taroa, Eniwetok, and the Palaus. In March the force began operating from newly won Majuro and from there Maury guarded the carriers as they went against the Japanese on the Palaus, Yap, Ulithi, and Woleai, 30 March to 1 April; covered the landings at Hollandia, 22 April; and raided Ponape, Satawan, and Truk, 29 April to 1 May 1944.

After brief availability at Pearl Harbor, Maury rejoined TF 58, at Majuro 4 June. Two days later the ships sortied to support operations in the Marianas Islands. First, they took part in the preinvasion bombardment of Saipan, raiding Guam and Rota during the same period, and then sailed north to strike at Iwo and Chichi Jimas and prevent Japanese reinforcements from reaching the Marianas from those islands. On 18 June they received word of a Japanese force en route from the Philippines to the Marianas. The following day the Battle of the Philippine Sea began as Japanese carrier planes attacked the 5th Fleet, then covering the Saipan operations. By the end of the two-day battle the Japanese had lost three carriers, 92 percent of its carrier planes and 72 percent of its float planes, a toll which left the Imperial Fleet in poor condition. After pursuing the fleet, the carriers, with Maury in the screen, struck again at the Bonins and then retired to Eniwetok, arriving 27 June 1944.

On 4 July the fast carriers again raided Iwo Jima. Then they retired to the Marianas where they supported the landings on Guam and Tinian, 21 and 24 July, respectively. During the next 9 weeks, with Maury still in the carrier screen, the force struck again at Iwo Jima and then moved on to support offensive operations against Peleliu, Ngesebu, Angaur, Yap, and Ulithi. By 10 October they were off Okinawa, moving from there to Formosa and Luzon and striking at Japanese installations in the Manila Bay area on 15 October. Eight days later, covering the forces in Leyte Gulf, they turned north again to engage a Japanese carrier force, now bereft of planes due to losses sustained in the Battle of the Philippine Sea and off Formosa. On the 25th, the Japanese were engaged off Cape Engaño and by the 27th their losses were increased by three cruisers and several destroyers,

Maury spent most of November cruising the waters east of the Philippines in support of operations on Leyte and Samar. Then, after availability at Manus, joined TG 77.4 and sailed 27 December 1944 for Lingayen Gulf to support the Luzon invasion. Attached in mid-January to TG 78.12 for an abbreviated tour as convoy escort she rejoined TF 77 at the end of the month and until 10 February 1945 guarded Lingayen Gulf and its approaches.

Returning to Ulithi 16 February Maury was assigned to escort the battleship Mississippi back to Hawaii. Departing 22 March, she moored at Pearl Harbor 3 April 1945.

=== Fate ===
She spent the next 6 weeks conducting training exercises in Hawaiian waters and then continued on, via San Diego and the Panama Canal, to New York, arriving 14 June. There an inspection team recommended that she be disposed of and on 18 August she proceeded to Philadelphia, Pennsylvania, where she decommissioned 19 October 1945. Struck from the Naval Vessel Register 1 November 1945, she was sold to Hugo Neu, New York, 13 June 1946; resold shortly thereafter to Northern Metal Co., Philadelphia, and scrapped by them at the end of the year.

== Honors ==
Maury received 16 battle stars and the Presidential Unit Citation for World War II service, placing her among the most decorated US Naval vessels of World War II. The Presidential Unit Citation was for the period 1 February 1942 to 6 August 1943.
