= Charles Vernon Gridley =

American captain (1844–1898)

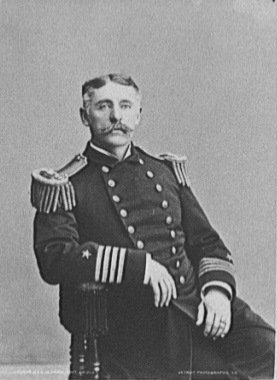
- Born: November 24, 1844; Logansport, Indiana, U.S.
- Died: June 5, 1898 (aged 53); Kobe, Hyōgo, Japan
- Burial place: Lakeside Cemetery, Erie, Pennsylvania, U.S.
- Military career
- Allegiance: United States
- Branch: United States Navy
- Service years: 1860–1898
- Rank: Captain
- Commands: USS Michigan; USS Olympia
- Conflicts: American Civil War; Battle of Mobile Bay; Spanish–American War; Battle of Manila Bay

Charles Vernon Gridley (24 November 1844 – 5 June 1898) was a captain in the United States Navy who served during the American Civil War and the Spanish–American War. He was second-in-command in the Battle of Manila Bay.

== Early life ==
Gridley descended from Thomas Gridley (1612–1653), who emigrated from England to New England in 1633. He was born to Frank and Ann Eliza (Sholes) Gridley in Logansport, Indiana, on 24 November 1844. His parents moved to Hillsdale, Michigan, when he was three months old.

== Naval career ==
=== Early life and career ===
After attending Hillsdale College, Gridley was appointed to the United States Naval Academy in 1860. He reported for duty with his class in September 1863, joining the sloop-of-war Oneida with the West Gulf Blockading Squadron. He distinguished himself with David Farragut at the Battle of Mobile Bay on 5 August 1864.

Gridley was promoted to lieutenant in 1867 and lieutenant commander on March 12, 1868. He was stationed from 1871 to 1875 on the only United States Navy ship based on the Great Lakes at the time, the Michigan, at Erie, Pennsylvania. While stationed in Erie, he married Harriet, the daughter of Judge John P. Vincent and had three children. Harriet was also a cousin of Civil War hero Brigadier General Strong Vincent. Gridley was promoted to commander in 1882. He also served a tour as instructor at the Naval Academy and another with the Cruiser Training Squadron.

Gridley was promoted to captain on March 14, 1897, and ordered to the Asiatic squadron and was assigned on July 28, 1897, to the command of the Olympia, Commodore George Dewey's famous flagship in Yokohama, Japan.

=== Battle of Manila Bay ===
During the Battle of Manila Bay on 1 May 1898, Gridley commanded the Olympia from inside the vessel's armored conning tower, an uncomfortably hot station in the Philippine sun. Dewey gave his famous command, "You may fire when you are ready, Gridley". At the conclusion of the battle, Gridley was not in a condition to celebrate, suffering from dysentery and what appears to have been liver cancer. The heat and stress of the conning tower further weakened him. Dewey would have relieved him of command had not Gridley protested.

=== Last days ===
Several weeks later, he was sent home. On May 25, Gridley was to begin his journey home. One crewman recorded the event as follows:

He came up out of his cabin dressed in civilian clothes and was met by the rear admiral Dewey who extended him a most cordial hand. A look of troubled disappointment flitted across the captain's brow, but vanished when he stepped to the head of the gangway and, looking, over saw, not the launch, but a twelve-oared cutter manned entirely by officers of the Olympia. There were men in the boat who had not pulled a stroke for a quarter of a century. Old Glory was at the stern and a captain's silken coach-whip at the bow; and when Captain Gridley, beloved alike by officers and men, entered the boat, it was up oars, and all that, just as though they were common sailors who were to row him over to the Zafiro. When he sat down upon the handsome boat-cloth that was spread for him, he bowed his head, and his hands hid his face as First-Lieutenant Reese, acting coxswain, ordered, 'Shove off; out oars; give away!' Later in the day the lookout on the bridge reported, 'Zafiro under way sir,' and the deck officer passed on the word until a little twitter from Pat Murray's pipe brought all the other bo's'ns around him, and in concert they sang out, 'Stand by to man the rigging!' Not the Olympia alone, but every other ship in the squadron dressed and manned, and the last we ever saw of our dear captain he was sitting on a chair out on the Zafiro's quarter-deck, apparently listening to the [Olympia's] old band play.

Gridley was physically spent, and his health began to sink even faster once he was finally released from the strain of command. He was transferred from the Zafiro to the commercial steamer Coptic on May 27, but he had to be taken aboard on a stretcher. He knew that his condition was grave and wrote simply, "I think I am done for it, personally."

=== Death and burial ===
Aboard the Coptic, on June 5, 1898, Gridley died while the vessel was in Kobe, Japan.

His body was cremated and sent home. Services were held in Erie, Pennsylvania's Cathedral of St. Paul. He was buried in Erie's Lakeside Cemetery. A cenotaph was erected in his memory at Oak Grove Cemetery in Hillsdale, Michigan.

Gridley was a member of the Empire State Society of the Sons of the American Revolution.

== Legacy ==
Gridley Monument in Erie, Pennsylvania

Four ships in the United States Navy have been named for him.

A monument to Gridley was erected in Erie and placed in the center of a city park, which was named Gridley Park. The engraved plaque affixed to the monument is made of a metal panel retrieved from the Maine.The USS Olympia is at Independence Seaport Museum in Philadelphia. "Man the Cannons Gridley" is a phrase used by some to remember his works in the war and to remember his legacy.

A seashell is depicted on the coat-of-arms of Gridley's original alma mater, Hillsdale College, in honor of his heroism at the Battle of Manila Bay.

== See also ==
- USS Olympia (C-6)
- George Dewey
- Battle of Manila Bay
