= Sugiura Kajū =

Japanese admiral

- 杉浦 嘉十
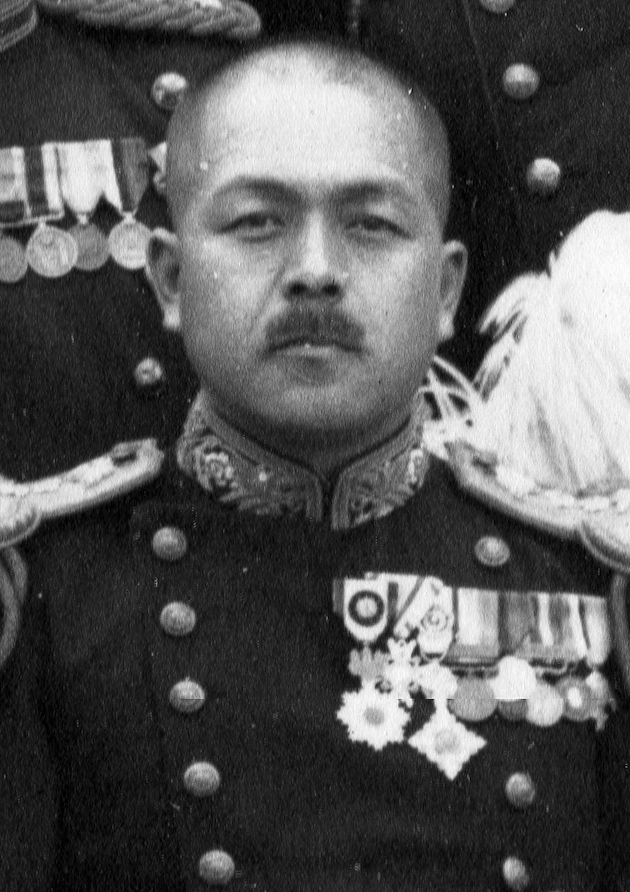
- Born: May 5, 1896; Aichi Prefecture, Japan
- Died: May 16, 1945 (aged 49); Strait of Malacca
- Military career
- Allegiance: Empire of Japan
- Branch: Imperial Japanese Navy
- Service years: 1918–1945
- Rank: Vice Admiral (posthumous)
- Commands: Tade, Uzuki; Destroyer Group 5 Destroyer Group 17; Destroyer Group 4 Haguro
- Conflicts: World War II; Pacific War; Battle of Vella Gulf; Battle of the Philippine Sea; Battle of Leyte Gulf; Battle off Samar; Battle of the Malacca Strait †

Kaju Sugiura (杉浦 嘉十, Sugiura Kajū; May 5, 1896 – May 16, 1945), was an admiral in the Imperial Japanese Navy during World War II.

== Biography ==
A native of Aichi Prefecture, Sugiura graduated from the 46th class of the Imperial Japanese Naval Academy in 1918. He was ranked 81st out of 124 cadets. He served his midshipman duty aboard the cruiser Azuma, and after commissioned as an ensign he was assigned to the battleship Fusō and cruiser Tone.

Sugiura returned to school, and became a torpedo and naval artillery expert. As a sub-lieutenant, he served on the Mutsu and the destroyer Kuri, and as lieutenant, he was executive officer and chief navigator on the destroyer Yūnagi. After graduation from the Naval War College (Japan) in 1930, he was promoted to lieutenant commander. He was given his first command: the destroyer Tade, on December 1, 1930. He subsequently captained the Uzuki in 1931. He held a number of staff positions through the 1930s, including that of instructor at a number of the naval ordnance schools, and was commander of Destroyer Group 5 in 1939.

Sugiura was promoted to captain on November 15, 1940, and assigned command of Destroyer Group 17 shortly after the attack on Pearl Harbor.

Sugiura became commander of Destroyer Group 4 (Hagikaze, flagship, Arashi, Shigure and Kawakaze) on February 20, 1943, and was thus in a central role in the Battle of Vella Gulf from August 6–7, 1943.

On the night of August 6, Sugiura's force carrying 950 troops and supplies for New Georgia was ambushed by US Task Group 31.2 (USS Dunlap, USS Craven, USS Maury, USS Lang, USS Sterett, and USS Stack). All four Japanese destroyers were hit. Hagikaze, Arashi and Kawakaze burst into flames and were quickly sunk by gunfire. The torpedo that hit Shigure was a dud, damaging the rudder only, and she escaped in the darkness. The many Japanese soldiers and sailors left floating in the water after their ships sank refused rescue by the American destroyers. Over 1,000 Japanese troops and sailors were lost. During the battle, Sugiura's flagship destroyer was sunk, but Sugiura survived.

Sugiura was appointed captain of the cruiser Haguro on December 1, 1943. He was killed on May 16, 1945, when his ship was sunk by Royal Navy warships during the Battle of the Malacca Strait off Penang, Malaysia. He was promoted to vice admiral posthumously.
