= Japanese destroyer Nowaki (1940) =

Kagerō-class destroyer

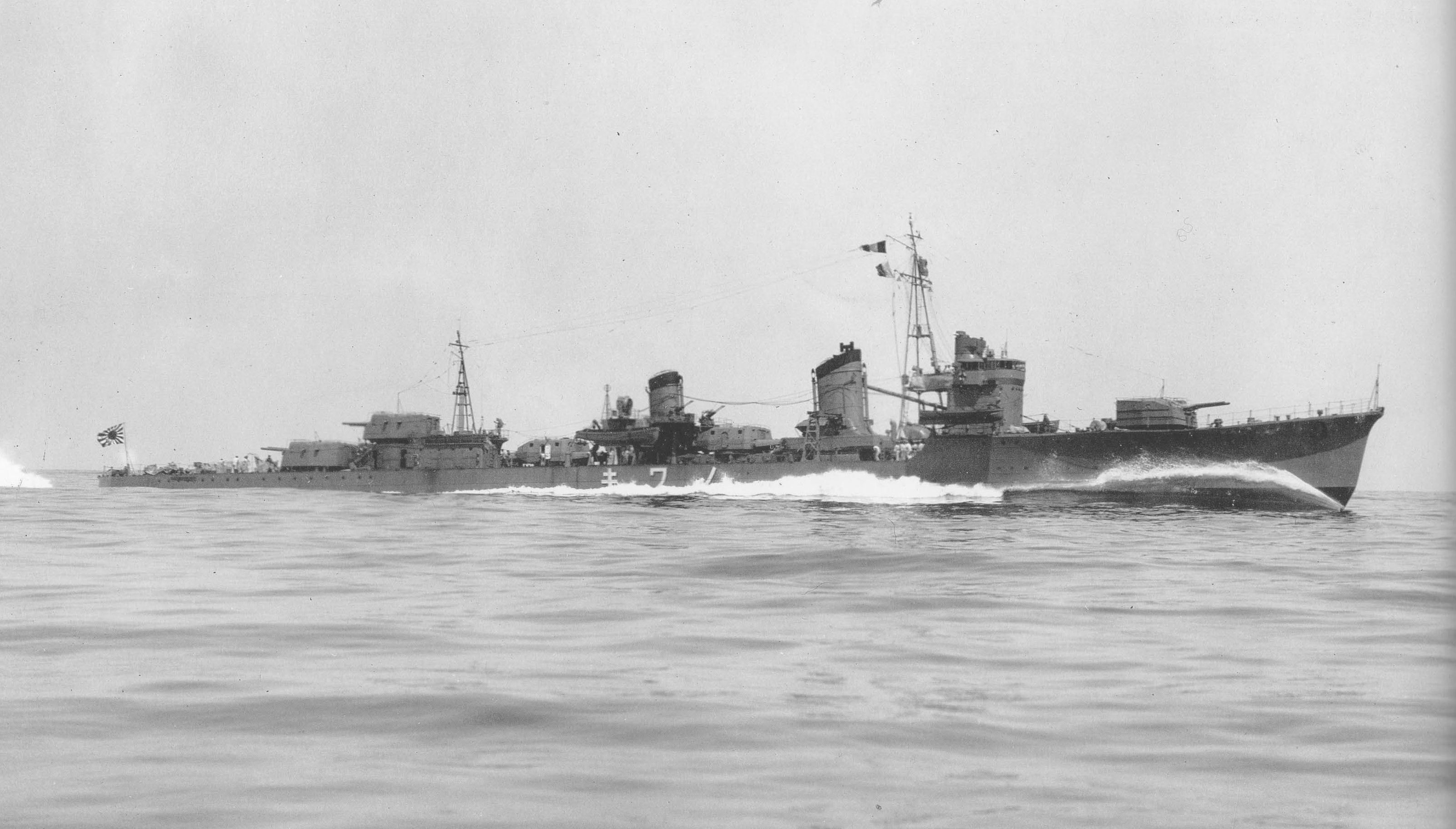
- Nowaki on sea trials off Maizuru, 19 April 1941

History

Empire of Japan
- Name: Nowaki
- Ordered: 1937
- Builder: Maizuru Naval Arsenal
- Laid down: 8 November 1939
- Launched: 17 September 1940
- Commissioned: 28 April 1941
- Stricken: 10 January 1945
- Fate: Sunk with all hands by US cruisers and destroyers during the Battle of Leyte Gulf, 26 October 1944

General characteristics
- Class & type: Kagerō-class destroyer
- Displacement: 2,490 long tons (2,530 t)
- Length: 118.5 m (388 ft 9 in)
- Beam: 10.8 m (35 ft 5 in)
- Draft: 3.8 m (12 ft 6 in)
- Speed: 35.5 knots (40.9 mph; 65.7 km/h)
- Complement: 240
- Armament: 6 × 127 mm (5.0 in)/50 caliber DP guns; up to 28 × Type 96 25 mm (0.98 in) AA guns; up to 4 × 13.2 mm (0.52 in) AA guns; 8 × 610 mm (24 in) torpedo tubes; 36 depth charges

Nowaki (野分; "Autumn Gale") was a Kagerō-class destroyer of the Imperial Japanese Navy commissioned in April 1941. She saw an extremely successful career during her service in WW2, either helping to sink or capture 15 ships during the war: including the destroyers HMS Stronghold and USS Johnston. She also survived an encounter with US battleships during Operation Hailstone where she was lightly damaged by the longest ranged straddle in history. Nowaki was finally sunk at the battle of Leyte Gulf after rescuing survivors from the sunken heavy cruiser Chikuma, when she was caught by a US cruiser-destroyer force and sunk with all hands.

== Design and description ==
The Kagerō class was an enlarged and improved version of the preceding Asashio class. Their crew numbered 240 officers and enlisted men. The ships measured 118.5 meters (388 ft 9 in) overall, with a beam of 10.8 meters (35 ft 5 in) and a draft of 3.76 meters (12 ft 4 in). They displaced 2,065 metric tons (2,032 long tons) at standard load and 2,529 metric tons (2,489 long tons) at deep load. The ships had two Kampon geared steam turbines, each driving one propeller shaft, using steam provided by three Kampon water-tube boilers. The turbines were rated at a total of 52,000 shaft horsepower (39,000 kW) for a designed speed of 35 knots (65 km/h; 40 mph). The ships had a range of 5,000 nautical miles (9,300 km; 5,800 mi) at a speed of 18 knots (33 km/h; 21 mph).

The main armament of the Kagerō class consisted of six Type 3 127-millimeter (5.0 in) guns in three twin-gun turrets, one superfiring pair aft and one turret forward of the superstructure. They were built with four Type 96 25-millimeter (1.0 in) anti-aircraft guns in two twin-gun mounts, but more of these guns were added over the course of the war. The ships were also armed with eight 610-millimeter (24.0 in) torpedo tubes for the oxygen-fueled Type 93 "Long Lance" torpedo in two quadruple traversing mounts; one reload was carried for each tube. Their anti-submarine weapons comprised 16 depth charges.

== Construction and career ==
The destroyer was ordered in 1937. Nowaki was laid down on 8 November 1939 and launched on 17 September 1940. The ship was commissioned into the IJN on 28 April 1941, and she was assigned as the third ship of the 4th destroyer division (Arashi, Hagikaze, Nowaki, Maikaze). In the lead up to the second world war, Nowaki steamed through the Terashima Strait and regrouped with Admiral Kondō's fleet.

=== Start of WW2 ===
With the start of the Pacific War on 7 December 1941, Nowaki steamed with the fleet to support the invasion of the Philippines, where she immediately scored her fist victory. The Norwegian cargo ship Helios was located by the 4th destroyer division, prompting Nowaki and Hagikaze to inspect her, and ordered Helios to regroup with the fleet, capturing the vessel, escorting her to Japanese waters where she was renamed the Setsuzan Maru and transferred to the Imperial Japanese Army. For the following days, Nowaki provided distant cover for the Japanese troop convoys invading the Philippines, and escorted the Malaya troop convoys. With the Philippines successfully captured, Nowaki switched her focus to the Dutch East Indies, escorting invasion convoys for Staring Bay, and operating in Dutch waters as distance support.

=== Battle of Tjilatjap ===
In early March 1942, the Dutch East Indies had just fallen into Japanese hands, and many allied ships were fleeing to safety in Australia. Nowaki and Arashi were assigned to operate alongside the heavy cruisers Maya, Atago, and Takao in hunting down these ships and prevent them from further serving the enemy. On 1 March, They were immediately successful in this role when Nowaki and Arashi located the Dutch freighters Tomohon and Parigi, and with gunfire sank both vessels without a fight. Later that day, Nowaki and Arashi located and sank the British minesweeper Scott Harley and the Dutch cargo ship Toradja, then halted and captured the Dutch steamship Bintoehan.

The next day, Nowaki and Arashi sank the Norwegian cargo ship Prominent. However, greater action was destined to ensue as they joined the heavy cruiser Maya as they were informed that land based aircraft had spotted an enemy warship. This was the destroyer HMS Stronghold, and the three ships sped to intercept the enemy. At 17:43, the trio spotted their target and closed the range, then at 18:21, Maya opened fire at 16,300 yards (14,905 m), while Nowaki and Arashi unleashed their combined twelve 5-inch (127 mm) guns at 11,300. They immediately closed the range as Stronghold began to take hits aft and flooding began to slow the ship. Over the course of a half hour, Maya closed to 3,000 yards (2,743 m), and Nowaki and Arashi to 2,000 yards (1,829 m). Stronghold was completely disabled, on fire, and slipping beneath the waterline as the abandon ship order was issued and the destroyer sank at 19:00 with the loss of 70 men. Nowaki fired 345 5-inch (127 mm) shells, Arashi 290, and Maya 635. (Note: Western sources often state Nowaki and Arashi torpedoed HMS Stronghold for the final blow, but Japanese sources only list them sinking Stronghold by gunfire)

On 3 March, Nowaki and Arashi tracked down the gunboat USS Asheville, which was also located by Japanese aircraft. After locating Asheville, they believed it was a merchant vessel and prepared a capture, only for Asheville to open fire with her three 4-inch (102 mm) guns to little effect. In response, Nowaki and Arashi closed to point blank range and dumped 300 5-inch (127 mm) rounds. Asheville's forecastle and bridge were almost entirely shot away, and the gunboat sank by the stern over a half hour with the loss of 170 sailors. Arashi only had room for a single survivor, Fed L Brown, who later died in a prisoner of war camp in March 1945.

Finally on 4 March, Nowaki found herself involved in an attack on an allied convoy destined for Australia, where she helped to sink the British oil tanker Francol, the minesweepers M-3 and M-51, and the depot ship Anking. A half hour later, the sloop HMAS Yarra bravely attempted to defend the remaining ships against her attackers, which prompted the gunfire of Nowaki, Takao, and Atago to blast Yarra and sink her in a blaze of glory. Atago and Arashi then captured the Dutch steamships Tjisaroea and Duymer Van Twist.

After either helping to sink or capture 13 enemy ships, the depleted Nowaki returned to Staring Bay on 7 March, then from 18 March to 3 April, escorted Atago on an inspection cruise across Tarakan, Balikpapan, Makassar, Singapore, and Penang. Nowaki finally returned to the homeland on 18 April, and was drydocked in Yokosuka for a much needed refit.

=== Battle of Midway ===
At the start of June 1942, destroyer division 4 left Yokosuka for a planned invasion of Midway Island; the Japanese aircraft carriers Akagi, Kaga, Sōryū, and Hiryū would lure out American aircraft carriers, and combined air and surface attacks would sink them in a decisive battle, while a large troop convoy would land in the Midway Atoll and capture the island. In what became the battle of Midway, Nowaki and the rest of the 4th destroyer division were assigned directly as anti-aircraft escorts to the carriers, and sailed with Admiral Nagumo's main strike force. As the carriers attacked Midway Island, the submarine USS Nautilus attacked the fleet, Arashi failed to depth charge and sink the submarine, which enabled Arashi to be spotted by a wave of planes from the aircraft carrier USS Enterprise and followed back to the main formation. The initial air attacks from USS Hornet were repelled, but a flight of dive bombers from the aircraft carriers Enterprise and USS Yorktown bombed Akagi, Kaga, and Sōryu, Hiryū initially survived and helped to sink Yorktown, but was herself sunk by Yorktown and Enterprise dive bombers.

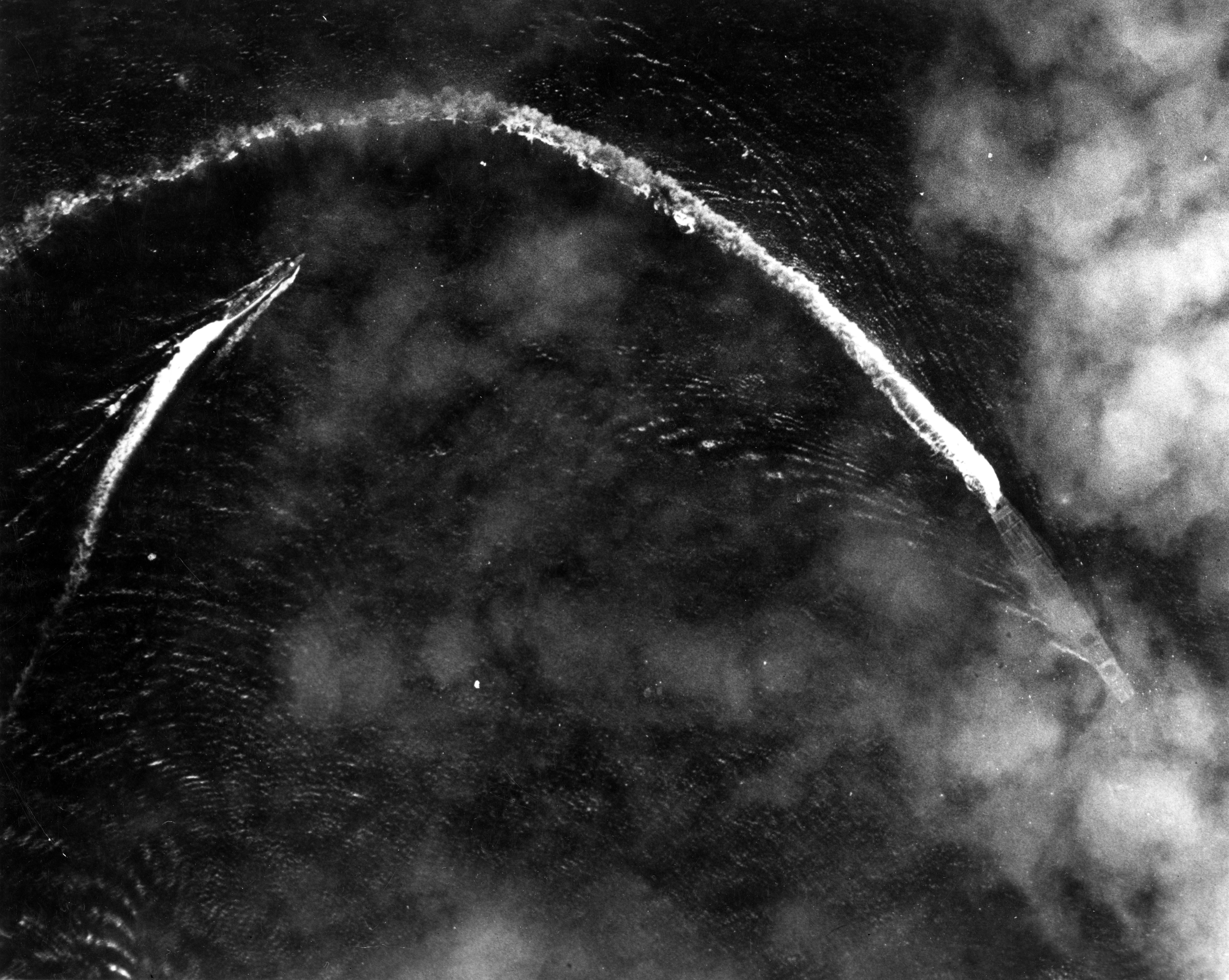
Nowaki maneuvering with the aircraft carrier Akagi during the battle of Midway, 4 June 1942

Nowaki's crew could only watch as Akagi, Kaga, and Sōryū exploded after being hit by US aircraft. Nagumo had continued a rearming process to land based weaponry in spite of knowledge of a potential enemy task force, and the bomb hits detonated the thousands of pounds worth of explosives inside the fight deck. All damage control efforts to save the ships failed, and there was only one thing left to do. Nowaki removed Admiral Nagumo from the destroyed Akagi and acted as Japanese flagship for the remainder of the battle, before helping to scuttle the dying Akagi with her torpedoes. Other destroyers did the same to the other carriers, ending arguably the most devastating Japanese defeat of the entire war.

=== Solomon Islands ===
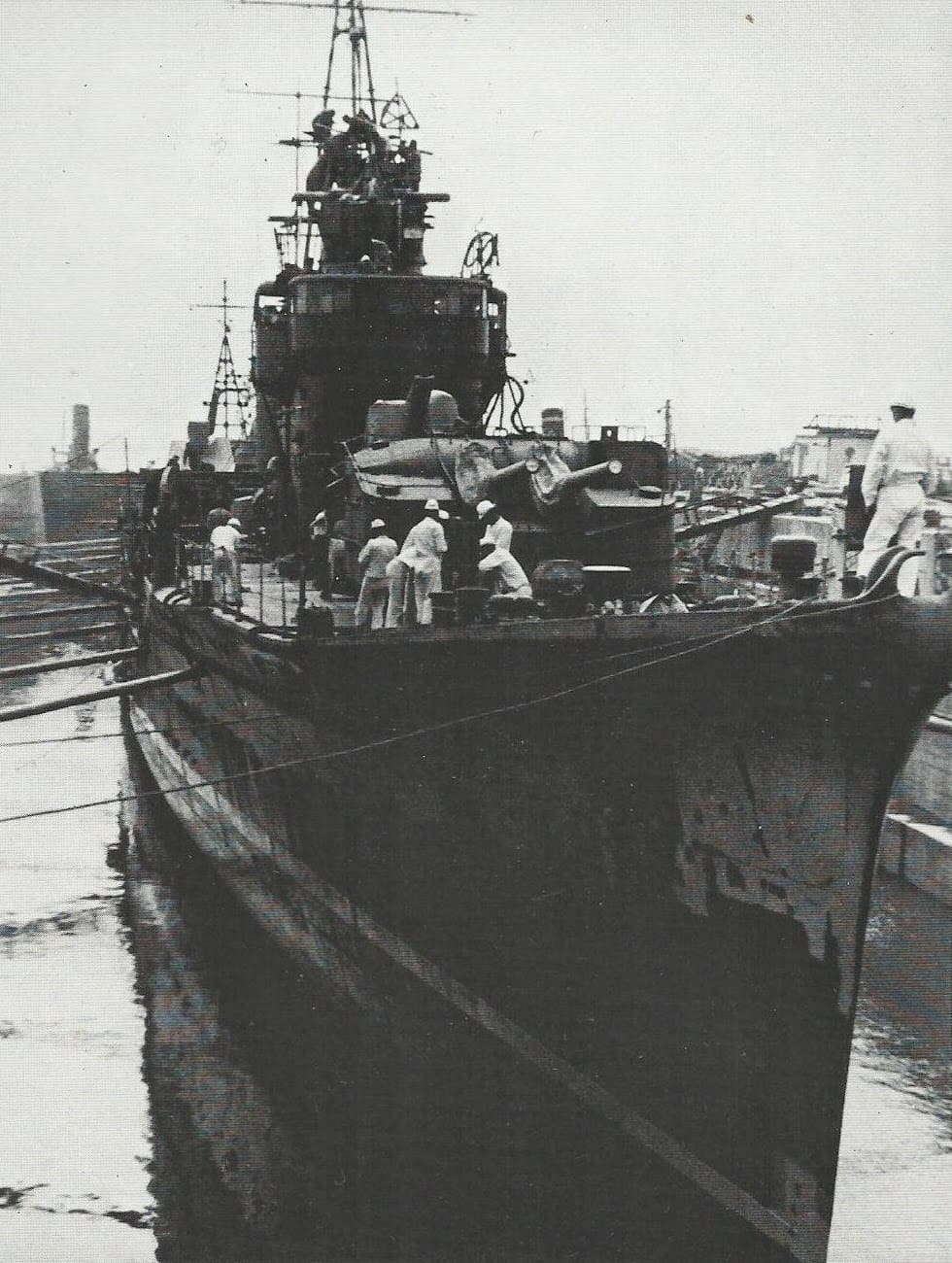
Nowaki docked in Yokosuka during the final stages of repairs to bomb near miss damage, August 1943

After the Battle of Midway, Nowaki transferred Nagumo to the light cruiser Nagara, then escorted the light carrier Zuihō to the Aleutian Islands, where she spent the next few days on patrol duty, before finally returning to Yokosuka. On 14 July, the 4th destroyer division was reassigned to destroyer squadron 10, and on 16 August, departed Kure to escort the Japanese fleet to Truk, arriving at their destination on 21 August. A week later, the Japanese aircraft carriers Shōkaku and Zuikaku and their escorts fought the American aircraft carriers Enterprise and USS Saratoga at the battle of the Eastern Solomons, with Nowaki again serving as an anti-aircraft platform. No waves of aircraft attacked the main fleet this time, but Saratoga aircraft still sank the light carrier Ryūjō of the decoy force, while land based aircraft sank the destroyer Mutsuki and the troop transport Kinyu Maru, ending the battle in an American victory as Nowaki and her companions returned to Truk.

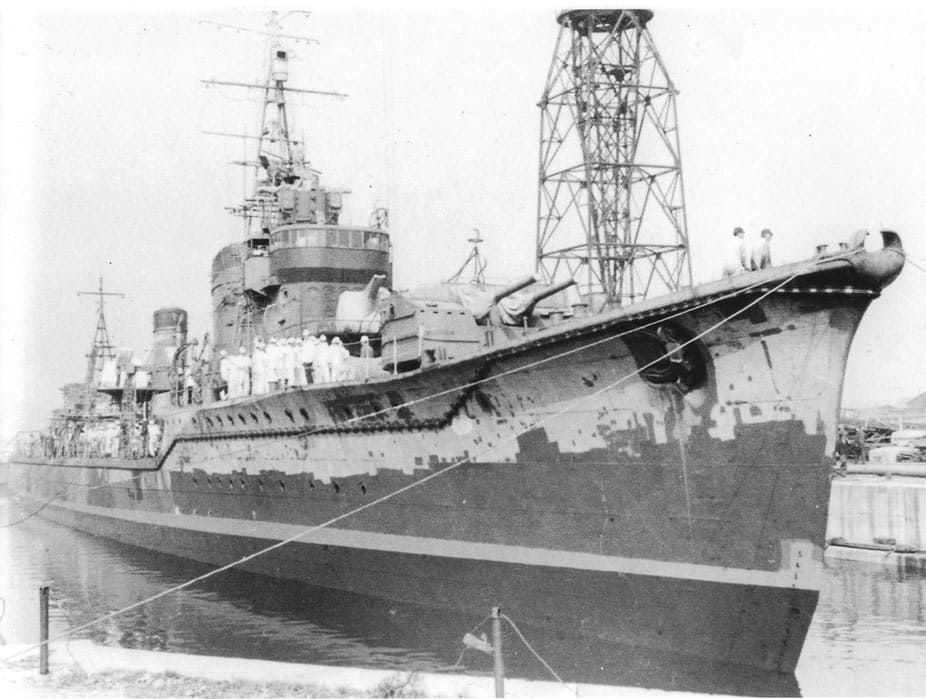
Nowaki after finishing repairs in Yokosuka, August 1943

From 1–9 September, Nowaki escorted the tanker Toa Maru - which was towing the crippled and disabled destroyer Shirakumo - to the Shortlands and back, and spent the rest of the months on patrol duty off Truk. The first half of October saw troop transport missions to Guadalcanal, where an air raid lightly damaged Nowaki with near misses, killing 11 and wounding 19, before escorting the supply group which supported the Japanese aircraft carriers at the battle of Santa Cruz. Waves of aircraft from Shōkaku, Zuikaku, Junyō, and Zuihō crippled the aircraft carrier USS Hornet (later finished off by destroyers Akigumo and Makigumo) and sank the destroyer USS Porter, and damaged multiple other American ships would suffering a single loss, ending the battle in a Japanese victory. Afterwards, she escorted the badly damaged Shōkaku to Kure, before departing for Rabaul as a consort to the escort carrier Akitsu Maru. At the start on December, Nowaki took part in a troop transport mission to Guadalcanal.

On 7 December, Nowaki was underway as part of a troop transport mission to Guadalcanal when land-based aircraft attacked the formation, and Nowaki was singled out. A bomb near miss landed right next to the ship's starboard center; so close it effectively acted as a torpedo hit. The engine and boilers were completely flooded, and Nowaki stopped dead in the water. The destroyer Naganami took Nowaki under tow, while the destroyers Arashi and Ariake escorted them to the Shortlands. From the 13 to 18 December, Maikaze further towed the crippled Nowaki to Truk, where over the next month she was patched up to just about get her engines up and running. From 16–24 February 1943, Nowaki escorted a convoy to Yokosuka, where she could receive more permanent repairs. The damage was so devastating, Nowaki spent until early August docked in Yokosuka under repair, where she was refitted with type 13 and 22 search radars and multiple new AA gun placements, and commander Kanada Takao took over command of Nowaki. During the break from action, Arashi and Hagikaze were sunk at the battle of Vella Gulf, and the destroyer Yamagumo was added to destroyer division 4.

Nowaki finally left Japan at the start of August to Truk, then from the 12 August to 2 September, escorted the escort carrier Ūnyō to Yokosuka and back, then from the 19th to the 25th operated with the light carrier Zuihō during a combined fleet response to US carrier raids in the Central Pacific, but this yielded no action as she returned to Truk. Nowaki and desdiv 4 spent October escorting troop convoys between Truk and Shanghai, and on the 22nd the Awata Maru was torpedoed and sunk by the submarine USS Greyback, which prompted Nowaki and Maikaze to rescue 1,000 survivors. Nowaki with Maikaze and Yamagumo escorted more troop convoys throughout November between Truk and Rabaul. From 25 November to 7 December, Nowaki operated alongside oil tankers during a combined fleet sortie in the Marshall Islands, and from the 11th to the 16th escorted the battleships Kongō and Haruna back to Sasebo, where Nowaki herself was drydocked for maintenance. Alongside new AA guns and radar placements, Nowaki's X turret was removed and replaced by a pair of triple 25 mm guns, while commander Kanada was replaced by commander Moriya Setsuji. At the start of 1944, Nowaki joined Maikaze and destroyer division 27 in escorting heavy units to Truk, then from 19 to 22 January, escorted the tanker Kokuyo Maru to Rabaul, before enacting a troop transport run to Lorengau from 24 to 25 January. and at the end of January, escorted Kokuyo Maru back to Truk, before spending the first 12 days of February, escorting convoys from Truk to Rabaul and back.

=== Operation Hailstone ===
On 17 February 1944, Nowaki and Maikaze departed Truk escorting the training cruiser Katori and the armed merchant cruiser Akagi Maru, shortly joined by the minesweeper Shonan Maru to the destination of Yokosuka, but it was the next day that a fleet of American aircraft carriers attack Truk and decimated the shipping in the base, which permanently destroyed Truk's capabilities as a major naval station, and it was soon afterwards that the air attacks reached Nowaki's group of ships. Akagi Maru was sunk to three bomb hits, Katori was hit by at least one torpedo that left her crawling at 2 knots, while Maikaze was hit by a bomb that disabled her engine and boilers. Nowaki took Maikaze under tow, but the Americans weren't finished with them yet. Admiral Spruance called off additional air attacks so that his group of surface ships could see some action, consisting of the battleships USS Iowa and USS New Jersey, the heavy cruisers USS New Orleans and USS Minneapolis, and the destroyers USS Bradford, Burns, Charrette, and Izard.

Hours later, the American ships were spotted in the horizon, which resulted in Nowaki dropping the tow cables and fleeing at maximum speed to escape danger. Iowa delivered the finishing blow to the limping Katori with her 16-inch (406 mm) guns, while New Jersey combined fire with the cruisers and destroyers to finish off the disabled Maikaze and sink the Shonan Maru. In the meantime, Nowaki was desperately fleeing when Iowa and New Jersey located an enemy destroyer and opened fire at 21,000 yards (19,202 m), and the resulting 16-inch (406 mm) gunfire straddled Nowaki several times before her silhouette disappeared on radar. Nowaki continued undetected for the next 10 minutes, but the battleships again detected an "Aoba class cruiser" at extreme range and opened fire. The resulting gunfire registered a single straddle which inflicted splinter damage to Nowaki, which fired at 35,700 yards (32.6 km) is the longest ranged straddle in history.

Although repeated splinter damage killed 1 and injured 3 others, Nowaki was not directly hit or even near missed even once as the destroyer continued on as the only survivor of her group; the other ships were lost with all hands. A few crew members could be seen crying due to the decision to leave Maikaze behind. 8 hours later, Nowaki found Yamagumo escorting a separate convoy, and joined them in a voyage to Yokosuka which lasted until the 24th. Nowaki afterwards spent almost a month anchored in Japanese waters until 12 March when she escorted a convoy of 12 troop transport ships to Saipan and back, which lasted until the start of April. The day after this mission first began the light cruiser Tatsuta was torpedoed and sunk by the submarine USS Sand Lance, which prompted Nowaki to rescue Rear Admiral Takama Tamotsu from the sinking cruiser and act as the convoy's flagship for the remainder of the journey. Upon returning to Japan, the destroyer Michishio was assigned to destroyer division 4

At the start of May, the Japanese were preparing for a decisive battle which would fulfill the Kantai Kessen strategy that had been planned since the start of the war. In preparation, Nowaki escorted the aircraft carriers Junyō and Hiyō and the light carrier Ryūhō to Tawi-Tawi, and remained stationed there for the rest of the month. By the start of June, Operation A-Go was accepted by the Japanese command, and after escorting heavy units to Saipan Nowaki, Yamagumo, and Michishio joined admiral Ozawa's fleet; Nowaki specifically joining Rear Admiral Jōjima's B force, consisting of Junyō, Hiyō, and Ryūhō. The action that became known as the battle of the Philippine Sea started on the 19th, and while Nowaki's group was not attacked, the aircraft carriers Shōkaku and Taihō were sunk by US submarines. Nowaki's inaction changed the next day when American carrier aircraft raided the group. Nowaki's AA guns opened fire, but failed to dissuade the American aircraft as they sank Hiyō and damaged Junyō, before moving on to other Japanese ships and sinking a pair of oil tankers. With around 400 Japanese aircraft destroyed alongside the sunken Japanese ships, the battle of the Philippine Sea ended in a devastating American victory as Nowaki retreated to Okinawa.

From 23 to 26 June, Nowaki joined destroyer division 4 in sailing for the Guimarras to meet with a convoy of oil tankers to escort, and after regrouping with them departed for Davao on 29 June. While underway, the Itsukushima Maru was torpedoed by the submarine USS Narwhal and heavily damaged, prompting Nowaki to remove oil from the tanker. On 10 July, the destroyer Asagumo was added to destroyer division 4. From 1 to 15 July, Nowaki escorted the battleship Fusō to Kure, then on the 30th departed on a troop transport mission to Chichi Jima and back, before escorting the battleship Haruna to Singapore from 15 to 21 August, then sailed to Lingga.

=== Battle of Leyte Gulf ===
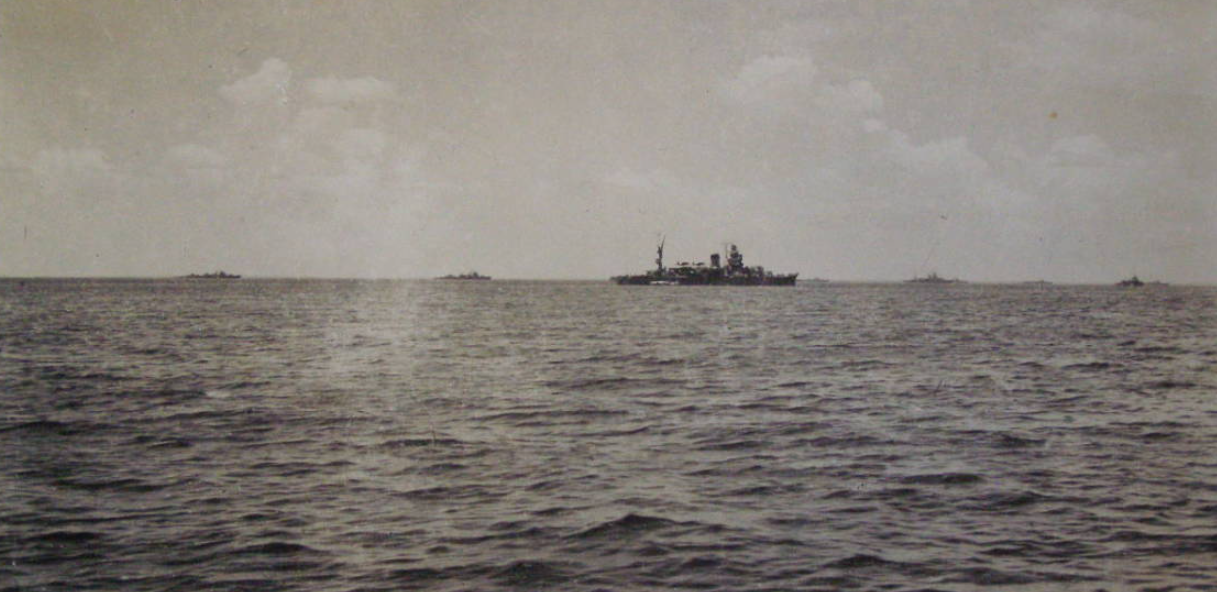
Nowaki (far right) anchored ahead of the light cruiser Yahagi in Brunei, 21 October 1944. The light cruiser Noshiro and several more destroyers are seen in the distance

On 20 October 1944, Nowaki arrived at Brunei to meet up with the rest of the Japanese fleet intended to take part in Operation Sho-Go. Due to the destruction of Japan's carrier fleet, their plan was to use their mostly intact surface fleet to engage and sink American troop convoys sailing through the Leyte Gulf and any escorts protecteing them, using the remnants of Japan's carrier task force armed with Kamikaze suicide bombers to distract the large naval fleets led by Admiral Halsey. Nowaki departed on the 22nd with Admiral Kurita's center force, consisting of Japan's "super battleships", Yamato and Musashi - the largest and most powerful battleships ever built - alongside the older but capable battleships Nagato, Kongō, and Haruna, escorted by 10 heavy cruisers, 2 light cruisers, and 15 destroyers including Nowaki. Nowaki joined other destroyers of squadron 10 - Urakaze, Isokaze, Hamakaze, Yukikaze, and Kiyoshimo - led by the light cruiser Yahagi in escorting the southern ring, protecting Musashi, Kongō, and Haruna.

On the 23rd, the plan immediately began to fall apart as the opening stages of the battle of Leyte Gulf began. Torpedo attacks from the submarines USS Darter and USS Dace sank the heavy cruisers Atago and Maya and damaged the heavy cruiser Takao beyond repair, forcing her out of the battle alongside the destroyers Naganami and Asashimo to escort her. On the 24th, the center force came under the much feared US carrier attacks in what would become known as the battle of the Sibuyan Sea. Yamato and three cruisers were damaged - with the heavy cruiser Myōkō torpedoed and forced out of the battle - but Nowaki and the majority of the center force was undamaged. This was because the vast majority of the air attacks were focused on Musashi which sank over 9 hours to at least 17 bombs and 19-20 torpedoes. Hamakaze and Kiyoshimo took on survivors before leaving the battle. Kurita ordered a false retreat as a result of Musashi's sinking, but two hours later ordered the fleet to turn back towards the Leyte Landings. Admiral Kurita ordered a retreat from the battle. However, two hours later, he revealed the retreat to be false and ordered the center force to steam back to the battle. The false retreat successfully fooled the American forces into believing the center force was well out of the battle, and following the annihilation of Admiral Nishimura's Southern Force at the battle of the Surigao Strait, when US forces discovered the decoy carrier force, Admiral Halsey took his ships to engaged it, leaving the troop convoys vulnerable. Among the victims of the battle of the Surigao Strait were Michishio, Asagumo, and Yamagumo, leaving Nowaki as the only survivor of destroyer division 4.

Battle off Samar

Nowaki saw a more noteworthy service as at 6:00 of 25 October saw the fleet run into a group of 6 American escort carriers, 3 destroyers, and 4 destroyer escorts, and with Kurita mistaking the enemy for full sized fleet carriers an all-out attack commenced. Nowaki, Yukikaze, Isokaze, and Urakaze followed Yahagi as they closed the range at full speed to attempt a torpedo attack on the American ships. At 8:30, the flotilla found a target as the escort carrier USS Kalinin Bay came under heavy fire from Japanese cruisers, and after careful aiming was undertaken Nowaki unleashed four type 93 torpedoes at the enemy at 15,000 yards (13,716 m). 24 torpedoes in total were fired at the escort carriers, and some came near Kalinin Bay and the escort carrier USS Saint Lo, but none hit. One torpedo almost hit Kalinin Bay before it was destroyed by strafing runs from US fighters.

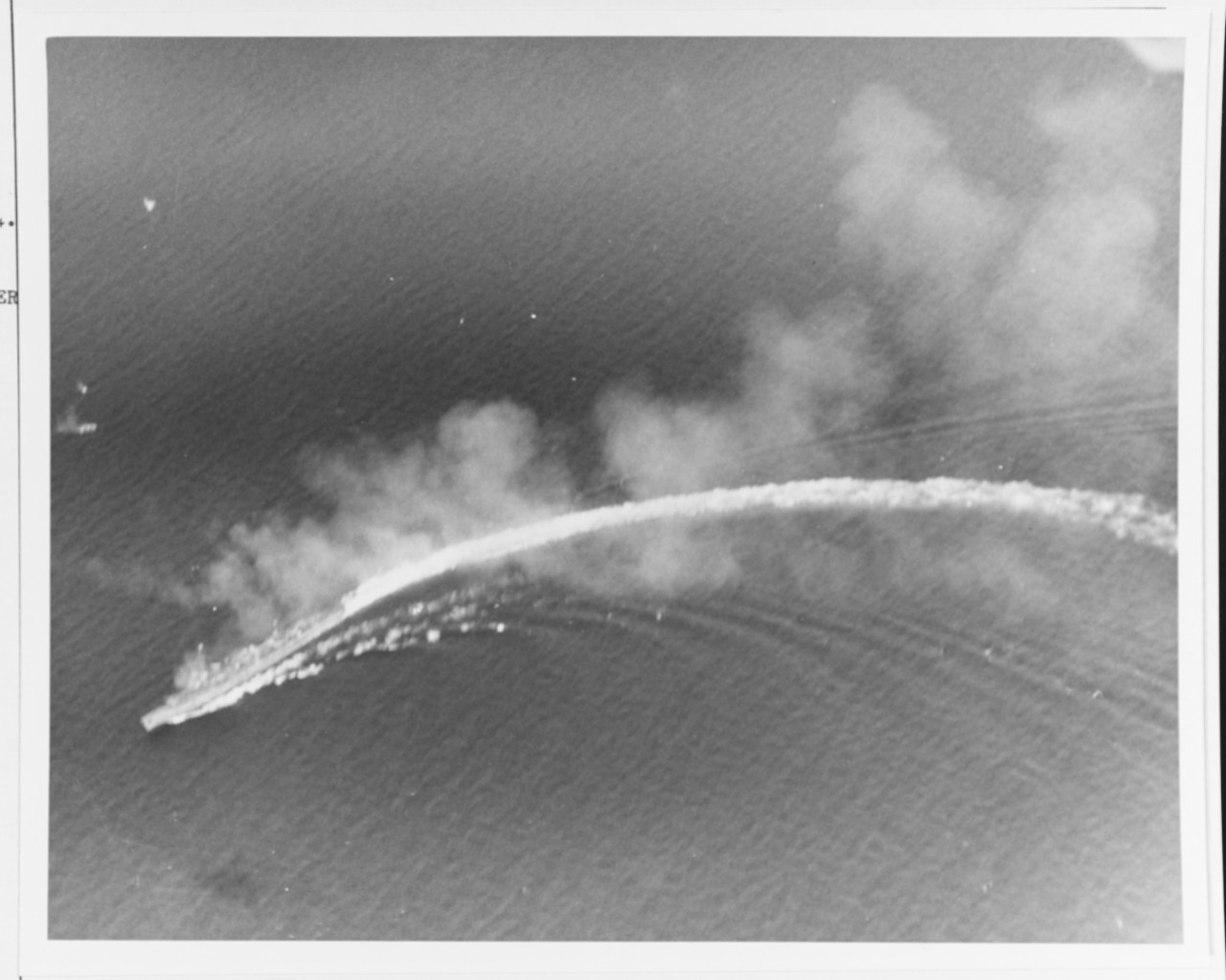
Nowaki underway during the battle off Samar, 25 October 1944

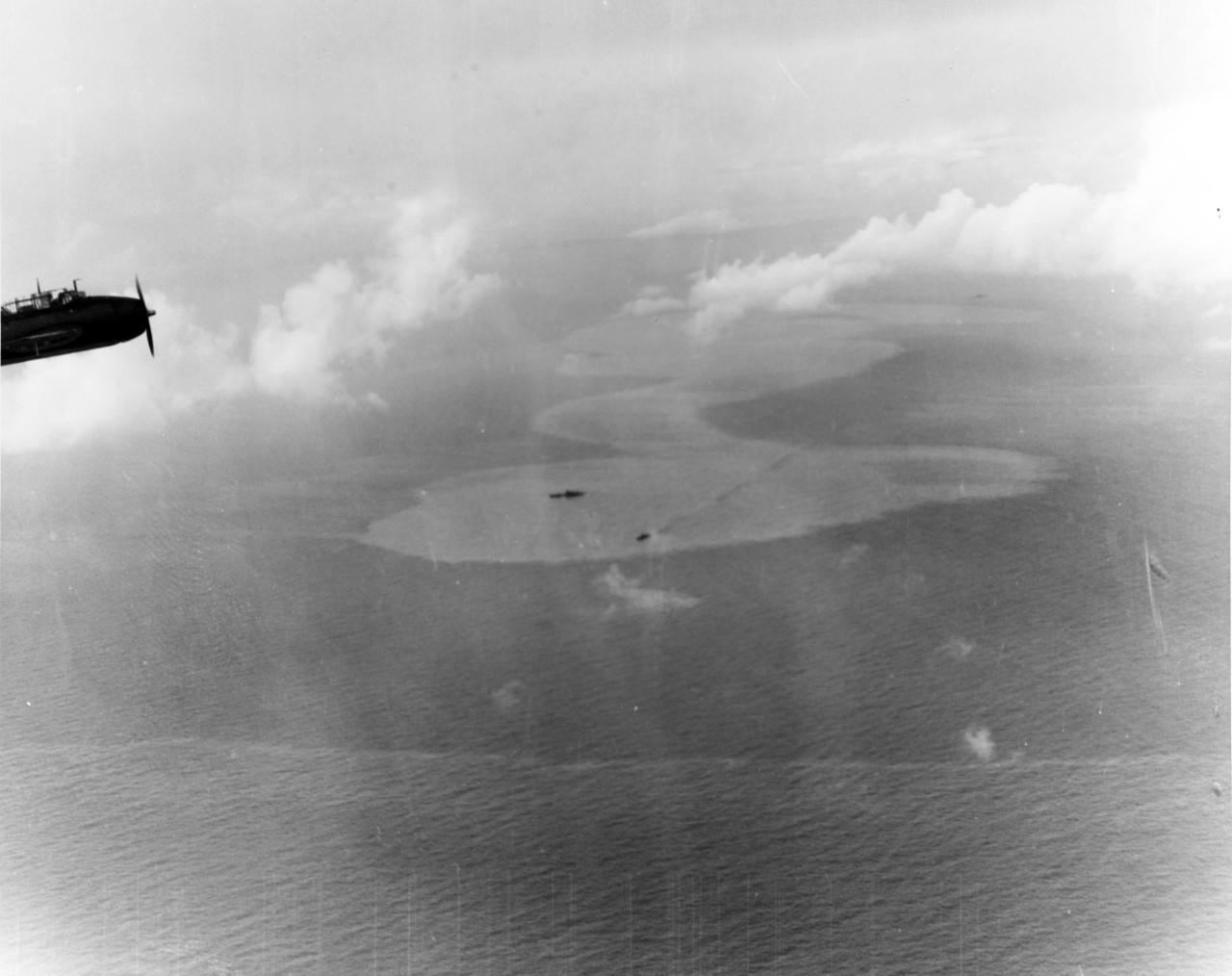
Nowaki protecting the disabled heavy cruiser Chikuma at about 13:30, before more air attacks finished her off an hour later. The fatally damaged heavy cruiser Chōkai is seen in the distance

At 9:00 Nowaki was continuing with the flotilla for another torpedo attack when a prime target was spotted. The destroyer USS Johnston was attempting to cover the sinking Gambier Bay when she noticed Nowaki's group of ships. She was already crippled by several 18.1-inch (46 cm) shell hits from the Yamato - destroying her 5-inch (127 mm) gun turrets 3, 4, and 5 and steering wheel and cutting her speed to 17 knots - but Commander Evans ordered an attack and attempted to cross Nowaki's T. Yahagi recognized this and ordered her destroyers to turn broadside, and scored at least one 6-inch (152 mm) shell hit that disabled Johnston's turret 2 before air attacks warded her off. Nowaki, Yukikaze, Isokaze, and Urakaze closed to point blank range and smothered Johnston in 5-inch (127 mm) gunfire. Shell hits destroyed her remaining turret and her remaining boilers and engine; punctured in her bridge, radio room, and superstructure; blew off her forward funnel; damaged her forward torpedo mount; and started a large fire next to her bridge which forced her command staff to evacuate to the stern, alongside poking many holes below the waterline. After 45 minutes of intense punishment from Nowaki and others, the abandon ship order was issued as Johnston was evacuated and left to sink just after 10:00. (Note: American accounts usually list 6 destroyers led by Yahagi, but Japanese sources only credit 4: Nowaki, Urakaze, Isokaze, and Yukikaze,)

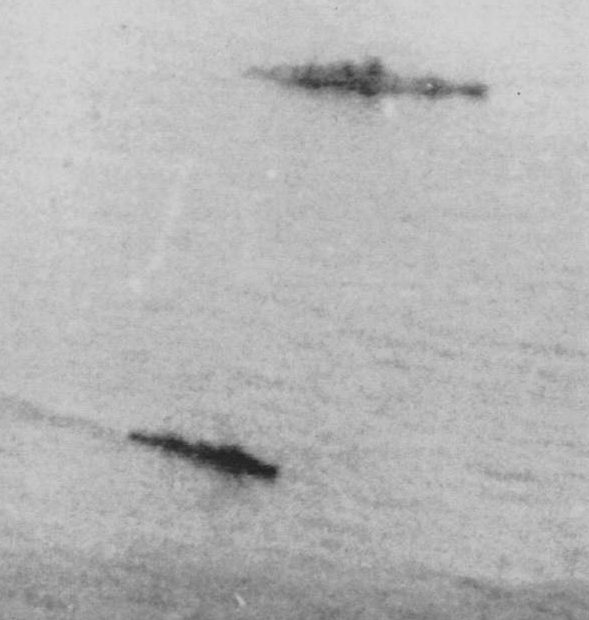
A closer photo of Nowaki and Chikuma

However, the battle claimed three Japanese heavy cruisers sunk, and among these was the heavy cruiser Chikuma. Chikuma had already taken about 200 5-inch (127 mm) shells from the destroyer USS Heermann and destroyer escort USS Samuel B Roberts when she was attacked by torpedo bombers from USS Kitkun Bay and USS Manila Bay, and first hit by a torpedo to the stern that cut her speed to 9 knots and jammed her rudder, then by another that completely disabled her. Yukikaze was initially tasked with assisting the crippled Chikuma, but she was ordered back as Nowaki was sent to replace her. Nowaki was seen and photographed at 13:30 by American pilots protecting Chikuma while efforts to save the ship were made. Nowaki about an hour later sailed away from Chikuma when another flight of aircraft from USS Ommany Bay hit Chikuma with another three torpedoes which caused the cruiser to very swiftly and suddenly sink, which forced Nowaki to turn back for survivors.

The last 12 hours of Nowaki's service is shrouded by mystery due to the lack of any sailors to tell her tale. It is known she rescued between 100-150 Chikuma sailors in the water. Older sources state Nowaki scuttled Chikuma with torpedoes, but the account of the cruiser's only survivor state she sank on her own. (Note: The lone Chikuma survivor was not rescued by Nowaki, and instead drifted to a local island) Nowaki then independently traversed the San Bernardino Strait separated from Kurita's fleet; the same route the destroyer Fujinami later successfully traversed while overloaded with Chōkai survivors. Unfortunately for Nowaki, it was just after that midnight with the start of the 26th that she ran into Admiral Halsey's fleet, including her former opponents Iowa and New Jersey. Nowaki desperately turned away, only for the gunfire of the light cruisers USS Vincennes, USS Miami, and USS Biloxi to immediately strike the destroyer with their 6-inch (152 mm) guns. After shells hit the engine Nowaki stopped dead in the water, with many following hits blasting her into a floating wreck. The destroyers USS Owen and USS Miller closed to point blank range and fired their torpedoes, and it was a torpedo from Owen that hit the crippled Nowaki and finally sent the destroyer to the ocean floor with the loss of all hands, including all Chikuma survivors aboard her, 65 miles (105 km) east-southeast of Legaspi (13°0′N 124°54′E).

== List of victories ==
Date	Ship name	Classification	Tonnage	Nationality	Fate
8 December 1941	Helios	Cargo ship	3,200	Norwegian	Captured
1 March 1942	Tomohon	Freighter	983	Dutch	Sunk
1 March 1942	Parigi	Steamship	1,172	Dutch	Sunk
1 March 1942	Toradja	Motorship	981	Dutch	Sunk
1 March 1942	HMS Scott Harley	Minesweeper	620	British	Sunk
1 March 1942	Bintoehan	Steamship	1,020	Dutch	Captured
2 March 1942	Prominent	Cargo ship	2,232	Norwegian	Sunk
2 March 1942	HMS Stronghold	S class destroyer	1,241	British	Sunk
3 March 1942	USS Asheville	Gunboat	1,760	United States	Sunk
4 March 1942	Francol	Oil Tanker	5,000	British	Sunk
4 March 1942	HMS Anking	Depot ship	3,500	British	Sunk
4 March 1942	M-3	Minesweeper	254	British	Sunk
4 March 1942	M-51	Minesweeper	254	British	Sunk
4 March 1942	HMAS Yarra	Grimsby class sloop	1,510	Australian	Sunk
25 October 1944	USS Johnston	Fletcher class destroyer	2,500	United States	Sunk

== See also ==
- List of ships of the Imperial Japanese Navy

== Readings ==
- Chesneau, Roger, ed. (1980). Conway's All the World's Fighting Ships 1922–1946. Greenwich, UK: Conway Maritime Press. ISBN 0-85177-146-7.
- Hammel, Eric. Carrier Clash: The Invasion of Guadalcanal & The Battle of the Eastern Solomons, August 1942. St. Paul, Minnesota: Zenith Press. ISBN 0-7603-2052-7.
- Jentschura, Hansgeorg; Jung, Dieter & Mickel, Peter (1977). Warships of the Imperial Japanese Navy, 1869–1945. Annapolis, Maryland: United States Naval Institute. ISBN 0-87021-893-X.
- Lundgren, Robert (2014). The World Wonder'd: What Really Happended Off Samar. Nimble Books. ISBN 978-1-608-88046-1.
- Morison, Samuel Eliot (1953). New Guinea and the Marianas, March 1944 – August 1944, History of United States Naval Operations in World War II, vol. VIII. Little, Brown and Company.
- Morison, Samuel Eliot (1958). Leyte: June 1944 – January 1945 History of United States Naval Operations in World War II, Vol. XII. Little, Brown and Company. ISBN 978-0-316-58317-6.
- Walker, Brent L. (2024). Yukikaze's War. Cambridge University Press. ISBN 978-1-108-83729-3.
- Whitley, M. J. (1988). Destroyers of World War Two: An International Encyclopedia. Annapolis, Maryland: Naval Institute Press. ISBN 0-87021-326-1.
