= Japanese destroyer Hagikaze =

Kagerō-class destroyer

Coordinates: 07°50′S 156°55′E

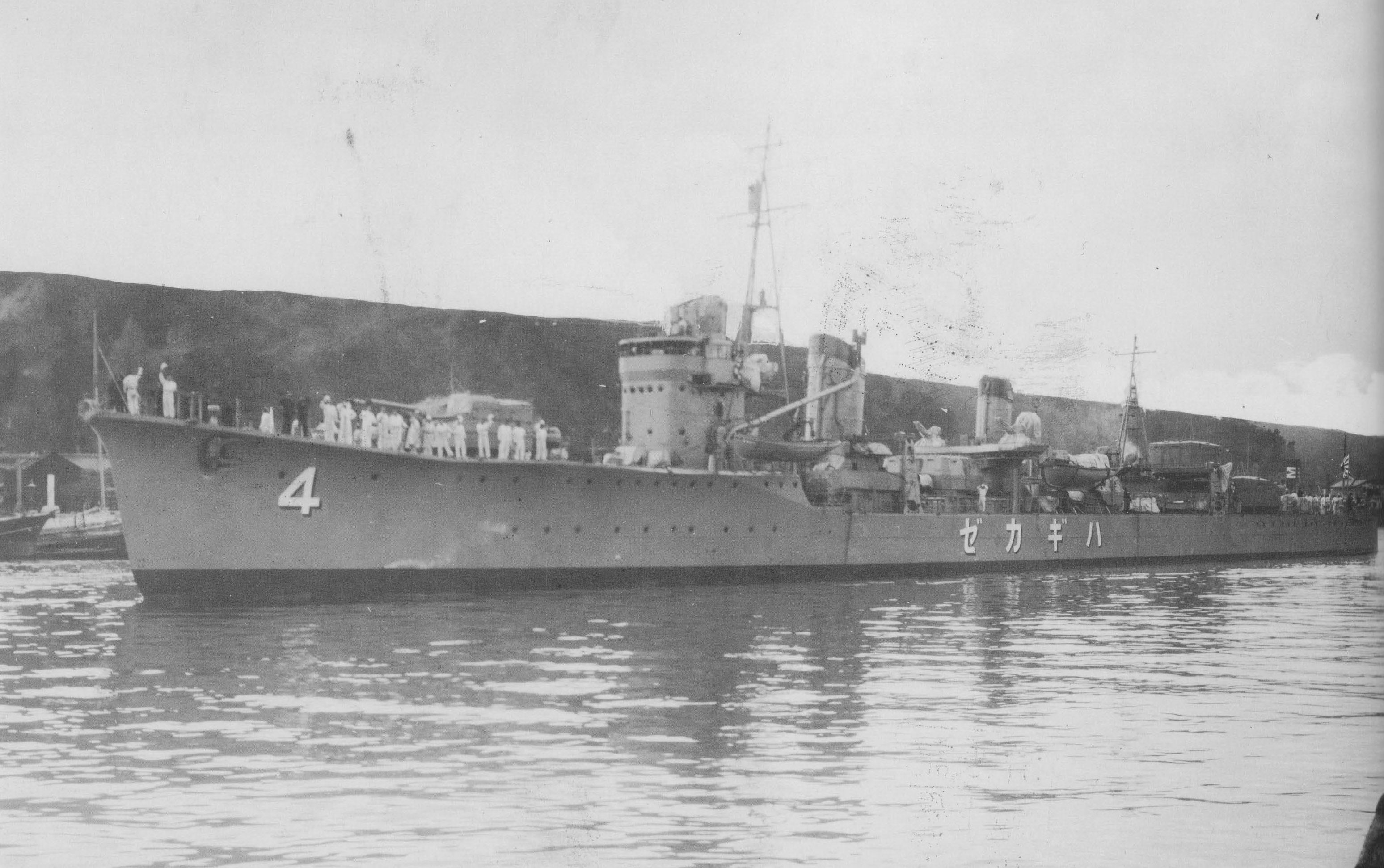
- Hagikaze upon commissioning, 31 March 1941.

History

Empire of Japan
- Name: Hagikaze
- Builder: Uraga Dock Company
- Launched: 18 June 1940
- Stricken: 15 October 1943
- Fate: Sunk in action, 7 August 1943

General characteristics
- Class & type: Kagerō-class destroyer
- Displacement: 2,490 long tons (2,530 t)
- Length: 118.5 m (388 ft 9 in)
- Beam: 10.8 m (35 ft 5 in)
- Draft: 3.8 m (12 ft 6 in)
- Speed: 35 knots (40 mph; 65 km/h)
- Complement: 240
- Armament: 6 × 127 mm (5.0 in)/50 caliber DP guns; up to 28 × Type 96 25 mm (0.98 in) AA guns; up to 4 × 13.2 mm (0.52 in) AA guns; 8 × 610 mm (24 in) torpedo tubes; 36 depth charges

Service record
- Operations: Battle of Midway (1942); Battle of Vella Gulf (1943)
- Victories: SS Helius

Hagikaze (萩風; Clover Wind) was one of 19 Kagerō-class destroyers built for the Imperial Japanese Navy during the 1930s.

== Design and description ==
The Kagerō class was an enlarged and improved version of the preceding Asashio class. Their crew numbered 240 officers and enlisted men. The ships measured 118.5 meters (388 ft 9 in) overall, with a beam of 10.8 meters (35 ft 5 in) and a draft of 3.76 meters (12 ft 4 in). They displaced 2,065 metric tons (2,032 long tons) at standard load and 2,529 metric tons (2,489 long tons) at deep load. The ships had two Kampon geared steam turbines, each driving one propeller shaft, using steam provided by three Kampon water-tube boilers. The turbines were rated at a total of 52,000 shaft horsepower (39,000 kW) for a designed speed of 35 knots (65 km/h; 40 mph). The ships had a range of 5,000 nautical miles (9,300 km; 5,800 mi) at a speed of 18 knots (33 km/h; 21 mph).

The main armament of the Kagerō class consisted of six Type 3 127-millimeter (5.0 in) guns in three twin-gun turrets, one superfiring pair aft and one turret forward of the superstructure. They were built with four Type 96 25-millimeter (1.0 in) anti-aircraft guns in two twin-gun mounts, but more of these guns were added over the course of the war. The ships were also armed with eight 610-millimeter (24.0 in) torpedo tubes for the oxygen-fueled Type 93 "Long Lance" torpedo in two quadruple traversing mounts; one reload was carried for each tube. Their anti-submarine weapons comprised 16 depth charges.

== Construction and career ==
Hagikaze was laid down on 23 May 1939, launched on 18 June 1940, and commissioned on 31 March 1941, where she was immediately sorted into destroyer division 4 (Arashi, Hagikaze, Nowaki, Maikaze) and spent her few months of peacetime duty on patrol and training missions.

With the start of the Pacific War on 7 December 1941, Hagikaze escorted Admiral Kondō's fleet to support the invasion of the Philippines, and it was the first day of the war she scored a victory over an enemy ship. The Norwegian cargo ship Helius was located by the 4th destroyer division, prompting Hagikaze and Nowaki to inspect her, and ordered Helius to regroup with the fleet, capturing the vessel, and escorting her to Japanese waters where she was renamed the Setsuzan Maru and transferred to the Imperial Japanese Army. Hagikaze then embarked on more escorting missions for the invasion of the Philippines, then the Dutch East Indies. On 15 February, Hagikaze conducted shore bombardment to cover Japanese troop landings, then operated alongside Japanese aircraft carriers for the following months, finally returning to Japan on 22 April, where she was docked for maintenance.

Hagikaze escorted Japanese aircraft carriers in what became known as the battle of Midway, during which four Japanese aircraft carriers and a heavy cruiser were fatally damaged by American carrier aircraft. Near the end of the battle, the fatally wounded aircraft carrier Kaga was scuttled by Hagikaze's two torpedoes, Kaga being scorched by US dive bombers from the aircraft carrier USS Enterprise during the battle. Throughout the following 2 months, Hagikaze departed on escorting and transport missions, but on the 19th of August Hagikaze was crippled by a bomb hit from B-17s which destroyed her X turret, cut her speed to 6 knots, and killed 33 men. Arashi towed the limping Hagikaze to Truk for emergency repairs before Hagikaze under her own power sailed to Yokosuka, which forced her into repairs for the rest of the year into 22 February 1943.

Upon the completion of repairs, Captain Sugiura Kajū chose Hagikaze as flagship of destroyer division 4. Throughout March, Hagikaze operated alongside the escort carrier Chūyō, then escorted the battleships Kongō and Haruna to Truk, before seeing out escorting and transport missions, with an interruption on 8 May when she attempted to assist the crippled destroyers Kagerō and Oyashio, but failed to arrive before they were finished off by land based aircraft, then it was back to escorting and transport missions. On 2 August, she took part in a troop transport mission when her consort, the destroyer Amagiri, rammed and sank the US torpedo boat PT-109, commanded by future US president John F Kennedy.

=== Battle of Vella Gulf ===
On 6 August 1943, Hagikaze along with the destroyers Arashi, Kawakaze, and Shigure were tasked with departing on a troop transport mission. The mission was opposed by Captain Tameichi Hara of Shigure, as they had already done the same exact route 3 times, and was worried their repeated strategy would be realized by US forces. However, his worries were dismissed as Hagikaze departed as lead ship of the group as Admiral Sugira Kajū's flagship. While underway, heavy rainsqualls completely blinded the port side, visibility was only 200 yards.

However, Captain Hara's worries would soon be realized as a cluster of American destroyers detected Hagikaze's group on radar, prompting three of them, USS Dunlap, USS Craven, and USS Maury, which the darkness of the early morning of 7 August 1943, ambushed the group, taking advantage of the weather to close to point blank range at a parallel angle to the Japanese destroyers and fired a total of 24 torpedoes.

About 5 minutes later, completely to the surprise of her crew, two of these torpedoes slammed into Hagikaze, immediately destroying all of her guns and torpedoes. Hagikaze came to a halt and began to list heavily to port with immense flooding overwhelming damage control. Shortly afterwards, two more torpedoes hit Arashi, while one more hit Kawakaze, crippling or fatally wounding both ships. A sixth and final torpedo hit Shigure, but it was a dud and failed to damage the ship. Once all torpedoes made their mark, Dunlap, Craven, and Maury all opened fire with their gun batteries, delivering the final blows to the three torpedoed vessels. Several 5-inch (127 mm) shell hits blasted Hagikaze, and in turn her crew could only response with machine gunfire, which failed to dismay the enemy as Hagikaze finally sank minutes later with the loss of 178 men. Simultaneously, Arashi and Kawakaze were also sunk with the loss of 178 and 168 men respectively, while Shigure unleashed a spread of torpedoes, which failed to hit their targets, before retreating from the scene. There were about 50 survivors from Hagikaze which were either rescued by the Americans or swam to Kolombangara island. Among the survivors was Admiral Kajū, who swam to Kolombangara and spent over a week surviving in the wilderness before being rescued by Japanese forces.
