= Japanese destroyer Arashi =

Kagerō-class destroyer

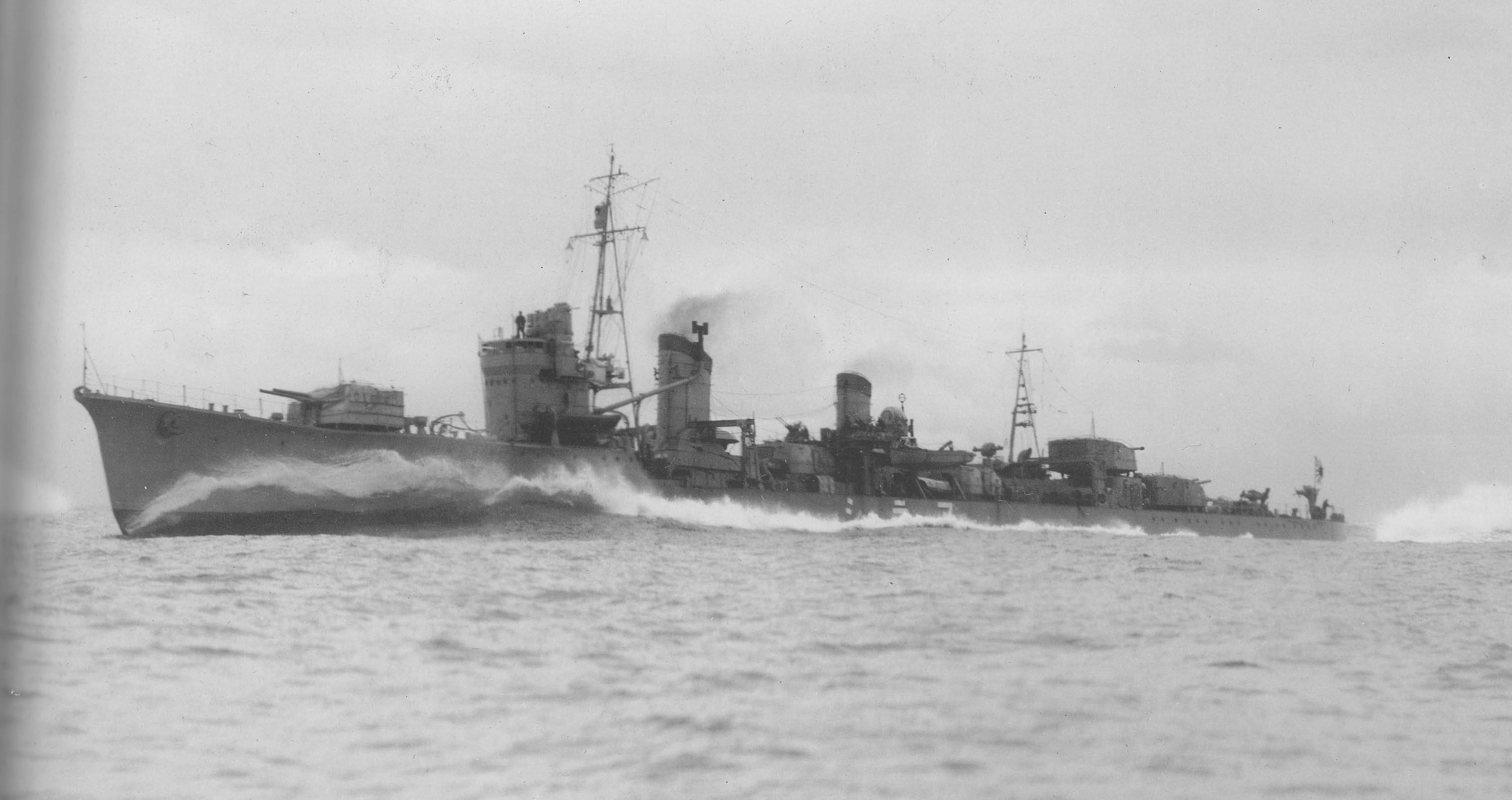
- Arashi underway in December 1940.

History

Empire of Japan
- Name: Arashi
- Builder: Maizuru Naval Arsenal
- Launched: 22 April 1940
- Commissioned: 25 November 1940
- Stricken: 15 October 1943
- Fate: Sunk in action, 7 August 1943

General characteristics
- Class & type: Kagerō-class destroyer
- Displacement: 2,490 long tons (2,530 t)
- Length: 118.5 m (388 ft 9 in)
- Beam: 10.8 m (35 ft 5 in)
- Draft: 3.8 m (12 ft 6 in)
- Speed: 35 knots (40 mph; 65 km/h)
- Complement: 240
- Armament: 6 × 127 mm (5.0 in)/50 caliber DP guns; up to 28 × Type 96 25 mm (0.98 in) AA guns; up to 4 × 13.2 mm (0.52 in) AA guns; 8 × 610 mm (24 in) torpedo tubes; 36 depth charges

Service record
- Operations: Battle of Vella Gulf (1943)
- Victories: USS Asheville (1942)

Arashi (嵐; "Storm") was a Kagerō-class destroyer of the Imperial Japanese Navy. After a short time of peacetime duties, Arashi escorted invasion convoys for the Philippines and Dutch East Indies at the start of the Pacific War for Japan. In March of 1942, Arashi achieved success as part of a mass raid to hunt down allied ships escaping the Dutch East Indies, where she helped to sink 8 ships and helped to capture 3 more.

Arashi gained infamy for inadvertently guiding US attack planes to the Japanese carrier fleet at the Battle of Midway, 4 June 1942 Arashi had become separated from the Japanese carrier force while attempting to destroy an American submarine, USS Nautilus. Following her attacks on Nautilus, Arashi steamed at high speed to rejoin the group. All four IJN carriers were sunk by Douglas SBD Dauntless dive bombers of American aircraft carriers USS Yorktown and USS Enterprise, giving the US a decisive victory and checking Japanese momentum in the Pacific War.

Arashi took part in escorting and transport duties throughout the Guadalcanal campaign, bombarded the Gili Gili waves where she helped to sink the Australian freighter Anshun, escorted carriers during the battle of Santa Cruz, before protecting the aircraft carrier Shōkaku for several months. Arashi was finally sunk by US destroyers at the battle of Vella Gulf, 7 August 1943

== Design and description ==
The Kagerō class was an enlarged and improved version of the preceding Asashio class. Their crew numbered 240 officers and enlisted men. The ships measured 118.5 meters (388 ft 9 in) overall, with a beam of 10.8 meters (35 ft 5 in) and a draft of 3.76 meters (12 ft 4 in). They displaced 2,065 metric tons (2,032 long tons) at standard load and 2,529 metric tons (2,489 long tons) at deep load. The ships had two Kampon geared steam turbines, each driving one propeller shaft, using steam provided by three Kampon water-tube boilers. The turbines were rated at a total of 52,000 shaft horsepower (39,000 kW) for a designed speed of 35 knots (65 km/h; 40 mph). The ships had a range of 5,000 nautical miles (9,300 km; 5,800 mi) at a speed of 18 knots (33 km/h; 21 mph).

The main armament of the Kagerō class consisted of six Type 3 127-millimeter (5.0 in) guns in three twin-gun turrets, one superfiring pair aft and one turret forward of the superstructure. They were built with four Type 96 25-millimeter (1.0 in) anti-aircraft guns in two twin-gun mounts, but more of these guns were added over the course of the war. The ships were also armed with eight 610-millimeter (24.0 in) torpedo tubes for the oxygen-fueled Type 93 "Long Lance" torpedo in two quadruple traversing mounts; one reload was carried for each tube. Their anti-submarine weapons comprised 16 depth charges.

== Construction and career ==
Arashi started construction on 4 May 1939, she was launched on 22 April 1940, completed on 25 November 1940, and after a series of trial runs was finally commissioned on 27 January 1941. Mishaps immediately ensued as writing the name of the destroyer Yamakaze backwards in kanji could be read as Arashi, leading to a mix up in the mail delivered to the two destroyers before the issue was sorted out.

From March to July of 1941, Arashi's three immediate sisterships were commissioned, leading to the forming of destroyer division 4; Arashi being appointed as Captain Aruga Kosaku's flagship of the squadron (Arashi, Hagikaze, Nowaki, Maikaze), while personal responsibility of Arashi fell on the shoulders of Commander Watanabe Yasumasa. By the time Arashi was finally in command of a 4-ship division with the commissioning of Maikaze on 15 July 1941, the Pacific War was only months away, leading to a very short interwar career consisting of various training duties in preparation for war.

== World War II ==
=== Early Operations ===
With the start of WW2 for Japan on December 7 1941, Arashi escorted Admiral Kondō fleet, consisting of the battleships Kongō and Haruna and the heavy cruisers Takao and Atago, out of Japan for an invasion of Malaya, before departing on January 11 1942 to cover Malaya troop convoys. Arashi spent the rest of January escorting the fleet, and on February 15 she conducted shore bombardment to cover Japanese troop landings on the Dutch East Indies. From February 18-21, she escorted the fleet from Palau to Celebes, then on February 23 escorted them through operations in the Java Sea.

After the successful capture of the Dutch East Indies, throughout early March Arashi was tasked to operate alongside her sistership Nowaki and ships of the Takao class cruisers in hunting down escaping allied ships attempted to retreat from the fallen territories. On 1 March, Arashi succeeded in this role when she and Nowaki together sank the 983-ton freighter Tomohon and the 1,172-ton steamship Pageri. Later that day, Arashi and Nowaki sank the British minesweeper Scott Harley and the 981-ton motorship Toradja, before capturing the 1,020-ton steamship Bintoehan. The next day, Arashi and Nowaki first sank the 2,232-ton cargo ship Prominent, then joined the heavy cruiser Maya and tracked down the destroyer HMS Stronghold. Arashi closed to 2,000 yards from the destroyer, firing a total of 290 shells, while Nowaki fired 345 rounds and Maya fired 635. The combined damage quickly disabled Stronghold, destroyed all guns and torpedoes, and overwhelmed her with flooding and sank the destroyer by the stern. The day after, Arashi and Nowaki located the fleeing gunboat USS Asheville. They opened fire and sank Asheville over a half hour, leaving only 1 survivor. Finally on 4 March, Arashi and Nowaki engaged an allied convoy departing for Australia, where Arashi helped to sink the 5,000-ton oil tanker Francol, then assisted the heavy cruiser Atago in capturing the freighters Duymaer van Twist (1,030 tons) and Tjisaroea (7,089 tons).

From March 18 to April 3, Arashi escorted Atago for inspection duties on several recently captured Japanese occupied islands, then from the 4th to 18th, she and Nowaki escorted Atago to Yokosuka, and upon arriving back in Japan Arashi was drydocked for maintenance after seeing so much action, where she remained until the end of May.

=== Midway ===
Arashi is most famous for its involvement in the Battle of Midway. Providing escort to the carrier group, the destroyer was alerted to the presence of an approaching U.S. submarine, USS Nautilus, when a Japanese Zero fighter aircraft dived and fired machine guns at Nautilus as it came to periscope depth. Arashi spotted the encounter and began to drop depth charges. The Japanese Task force changed course while Arashi continued its attack on Nautilus. Having kept Nautilus down long enough that she no longer was a threat, the captain of Arashi finally broke off the attack and steamed north to rejoin the carrier group. As two squadrons of dive bombers from Enterprise searched above for the Japanese Task Force, Arashi was spotted making great speed to the north. The ship's speed created a long wake, which acted as a direction arrow to the American aviators, guiding them to the Japanese carriers. Meanwhile, Japanese fighter aircraft protecting the carriers had been pulled away as they all attempted to engage an incoming torpedo attack from Hornet's VT-8 torpedo squad. At the moment of decision, the Japanese carriers were essentially without high air cover. This made for an uncontested approach for the American dive bombers. The Enterprise dive bombers happened to arrive over the Japanese carriers Kaga and Akagi unimpeded, scoring multiple hits on Kaga and a single hit on Akagi that doomed both ships. Several hours, after main battle, Arashi took on sailors from Akagi, then helped to scuttle the destroyed carrier with torpedo hits.

During the battle Arashi's crew picked up, and subsequently murdered, one of the downed airman from Yorktown. He had been made to provide the Japanese with a general description of the make-up of the force they had been fighting against, the only clear description of the American carrier forces the Japanese obtained during the battle. According to Admiral Chūichi Nagumo's battle report, the airman died the day following his recovery and was buried at sea. Among other facts the Japanese learned, the report indicated the pilot had been from Chicago. This was in fact Ensign Wesley Osmus, one of the TBD pilots of VT-3. Osmus was flying the last plane in VT-3's formation, and thus was first to be attacked and destroyed as they made their approach. Osmus was picked up later on 4 June and buried 5 June. A U.S. Naval investigation after the war interviewed witnesses who reported that after his interrogation Osmus had been taken to the stern of Arashi and struck in the back of the neck with a fire axe. He clung briefly to the railing, and then was pushed overboard into the sea. An attempt was made to find the captain of Arashi, Commander Watanabe Yasumasa, and try him for war crimes, but it was discovered that he had died later in the conflict (he was Killed In Action as Commander Destroyer Division 1 aboard destroyer Numakaze on 18 December 1943), and the matter was set aside.

=== Further service ===
After the battle from June 9, Arashi escorted the light carrier Zuihō to Wake Island, then spent the rest of the month into July 12 patrolling just outside of the Aleutian Islands, then from July 30 to August 12 she escorted troop transports throughout several Japanese occupied islands then back to Truk, and from the 16th to 18th took part in a troop transport run to Guadalcanal. The next day, Arashi's consort, the destroyer Hagikaze was badly damaged by American air attacks, forcing Arashi to escort her to Truk which lasted until the 24th, before steaming to Rabaul, and then engaging in two troop transport missions to Milne Bay.

On September 6, Arashi assisted the elderly light cruiser Tatsuta in bombarding the Gili Gili warves, shelling the beach and surrounding areas to assist in the Island's evacuation. During the bombardment, Arashi and Tatsuta located the 3,188-ton Australian freighter Anshun (which had been lent to the US army) and immediately opened fire, hitting Anshun at least ten times and causing her to capsize and sink, killing two men and injuring two others. From the 14th to 15th, she escorted the troop ship Sado maru to the Shortlands, then took part in a troop transport run to Guadalcanal the next day. Arashi attempted to do the same thing on the 18th, but enroute was attacked by aircraft from Henderson Field. During the action, Arashi was almost torpedoed, but the torpedo landed too deep and passed below the ship. However, this encounter was still enough of a scare for the troop transport run to be aborted and for Arashi to return to Truk.

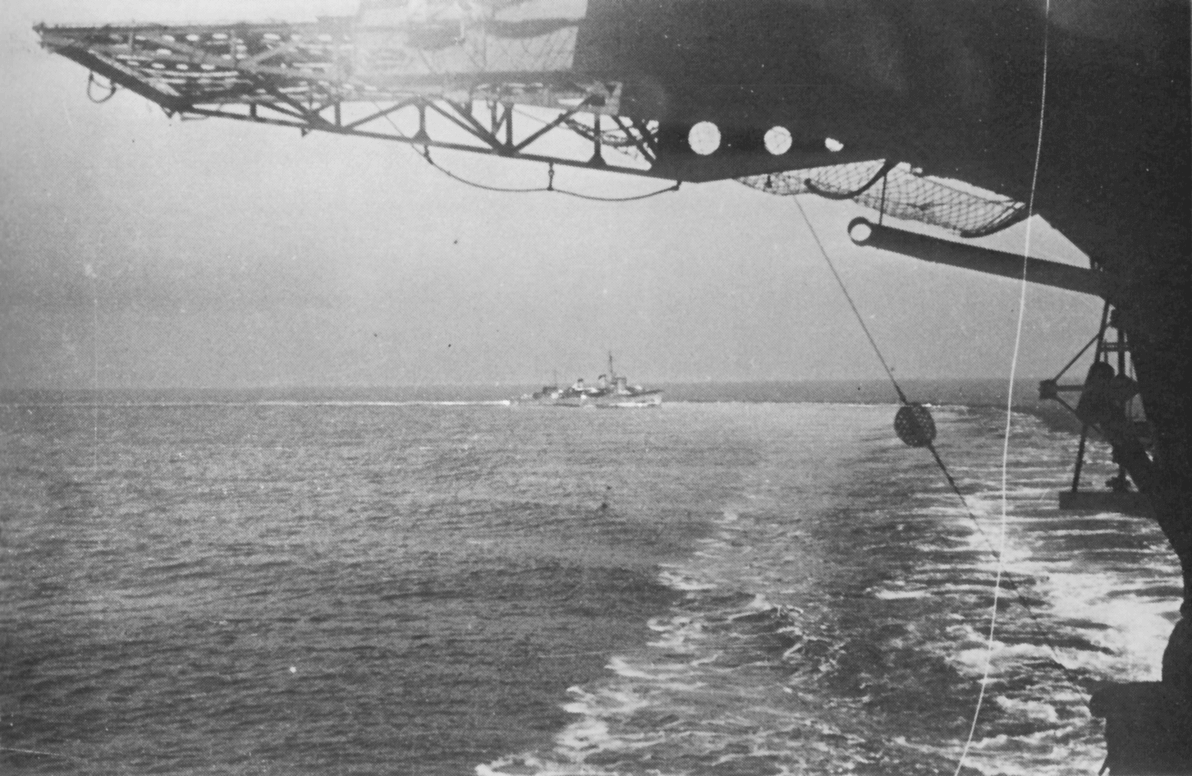
Arashi with the carrier Shōkaku on training duties, 17 March 1943

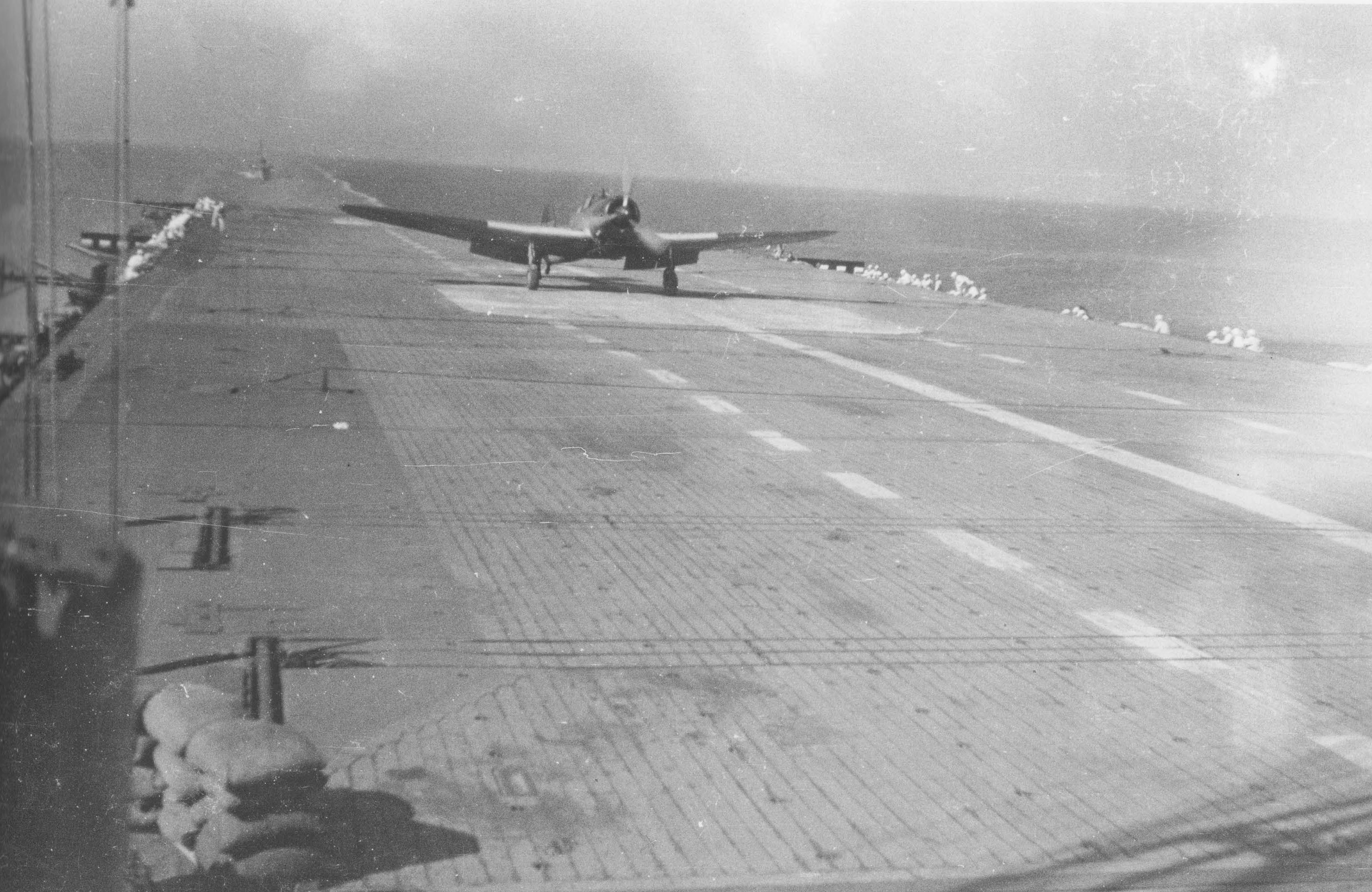
Arashi following Shōkaku, 18 March 1943

Throughout most of October, Arashi patrolled outside of the Solomon Islands, then escorted aircraft carriers at the battle of Santa Cruz on the 26th, then she was drydocked for most of November for refit, then escorted troop ships to Rabaul. Throughout December, Arashi took part on troop transport missions to Guadalcanal, and on one such mission her consort, the destroyer Teruzuki was sunk to PT-boat attacks, prompting Arashi to rescue 140 survivors. Arashi started off 1943 by escorting her badly damaged sistership Hatsukaze, which had managed to help to sink the torpedo boats PT-43 and PT-112, but not before PT-112 hit her with a torpedo, making sure she made it to the Shortlands where she began repairs. Afterwards she covered a troop transport mission to Guadalcanal where she was damaged by bomb near misses from US aircraft, forcing her to undergo repairs for 2 days. In early February, she covered the evacuations of Guadalcanal, then escorted several major warships from Truk to Yokosuka, where she was drydocked for repairs on February 20. After repairs were completed in May, Arashi was delegated to escorting the aircraft carrier Shōkaku on training missions for new air crews, before escorting the main fleet from Japan to Truk, then spent nearly the rest of July escorting the seaplane tender Nisshin to several bases. At the end of July, Arashi reassigned to troop transport missions, engaging in such a mission on the 27th. Arashi took part in yet another troop transport mission through the Vella Gulf on August 1-2, and it was on this mission that the lead ship of the division, the destroyer Amagiri, rammed and sank the American torpedo boat PT-109, commanded by future US president John F Kennedy.

=== Battle of Vella Gulf ===
Main Article: Battle of Vella Gulf

On August 6 1943, Arashi again departed in an attempt to land reinforcements through a troop transport mission along with the destroyers Hagikaze, Kawakaze, and Shigure transiting through Kolombangara. Underway, heavy fog blinded the force to the port side, limiting visibility to 200 yards. It was in the night that the worst case scenario happened, three American destroyers, USS Dunlap, Craven, and Maury, detected the Japanese destroyers on radar and took advantage of the limited visibility to close to firing range, which enabled them to fire 24 torpedoes. Arashi's crew watched in horror as a torpedo hit and blew up Kawakaze's engine room and sank her. However, to even more horror Arashi was hit by two more torpedoes, took on water, and began to sink due to rapid flooding. Hagikaze was then hit by two torpedoes, bursting into flames and sinking immediately. Arashi was sinking by the stern when the enemy destroyers opened fire. Arashi could only fire her machine guns in a desperate attempt to do anything, which was for nothing as the resulting shell hits ignited Arashi's magazines, finishing her off and sending her crashing into the ocean floor with the loss of between 178-182 men, including commander Koshichi Sugioka. 70 survivors were either rescued by Japanese ships or swam ashore.
