= Battle of the Malacca Strait =

1945 Naval battle in World War II

- Part of the Pacific theater of World War II
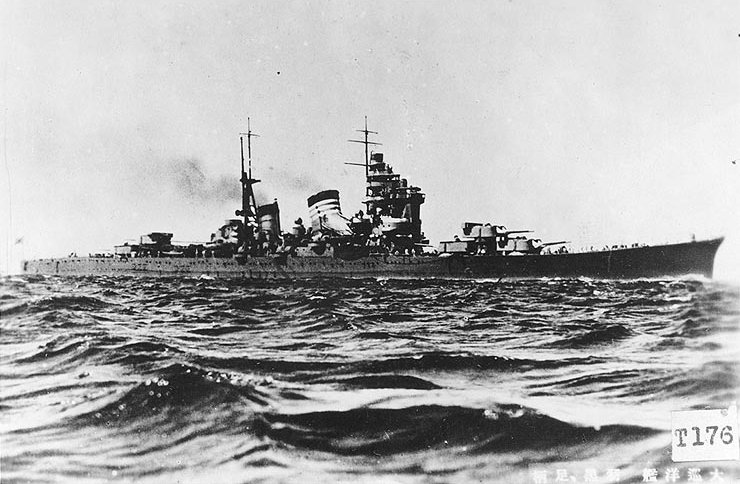
- Japanese cruiser Haguro, c. 1936
| Date | 15–16 May 1945 |
| Location | Strait of Malacca, Indian Ocean 4°N 100°E |
| Result | British victory |

Belligerents
| United Kingdom | Japan |

Commanders and leaders
| Manley Power | Shigeru Fukudome; Shintarō Hashimoto †; Sugiura Kajū † |

Strength
| 5 destroyers | 1 heavy cruiser 1 destroyer |

Casualties and losses
| 2 killed 3 wounded 1 destroyer damaged | 927 killed 1 heavy cruiser sunk 1 destroyer damaged |

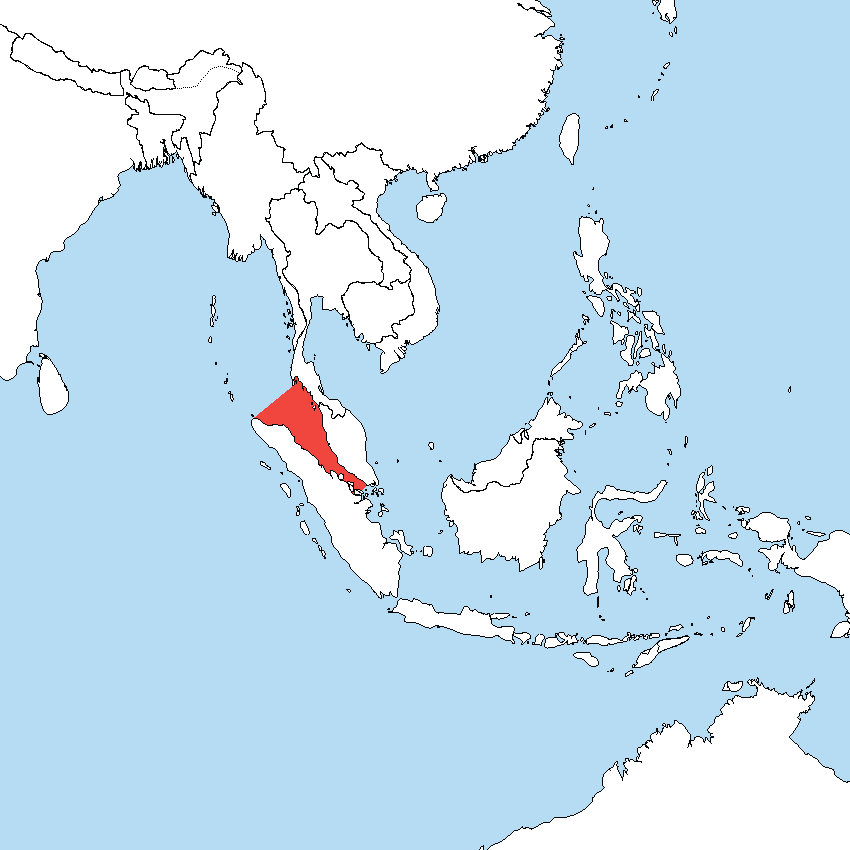
Strait of Malacca

The Battle of the Malacca Strait, sometimes called the Sinking of Haguro, and in Japanese sources as the Battle off Penang (ペナン沖海戦), was a naval battle that resulted from the British search-and-destroy operation in May 1945, called Operation Dukedom, that resulted in the sinking of the Japanese cruiser Haguro. Haguro had been operating as a supply ship for Japanese garrisons in the Dutch East Indies and the Bay of Bengal since 9 April 1945.

== Background ==
On 9 May, Haguro left Singapore, escorted by the destroyer Kamikaze, to evacuate the Japanese garrison in the Andaman Islands located in Port Blair back to Singapore. The Royal Navy was alerted to this by a decrypted Japanese naval signal, subsequently confirmed by a sighting by the submarines HMS Statesman and Subtle. Force 61 of the Eastern Fleet set sail on 10 May from Trincomalee, Ceylon, to intercept the Japanese ships. The Japanese were unwilling to risk any battle and, on receipt of an air reconnaissance warning, they returned to Singapore.

On 14 May, Haguro and Kamikaze tried again and left Singapore. The next day, they were spotted by aircraft from Force 61. The subsequent bombing attack by Grumman Avenger Mk.IIs of 851 Naval Air Squadron caused only minor damage to Haguro, for the loss of one aircraft whose crew was taken prisoner by the Japanese.

== Battle ==
Information was relayed to the Japanese that two British destroyer squadrons had been sighted heading towards them. Again, they reversed course to return to the Malacca Strait. This change had been anticipated, however, and the 26th Destroyer Flotilla, under Captain Manley Power, steamed to intercept. The flotilla was made up of HMS Saumarez (flotilla leader) and the V-class destroyers, Verulam, Venus, Vigilant, and Virago.

In heavy rain squalls with lightning, Ordinary Seaman Normal Poole (awarded the DSM for his competence and strength of character on this occasion), on radar watch on the Venus, reported a sighting of a big ship at 34 nmi (39 mi; 63 km), and though no other operator could see it, he persisted "almost to the point of insubordination". His captain and the flotilla commander were eventually persuaded. The British destroyers arranged themselves in a crescent cordon and allowed the Japanese ships to sail into the trap.

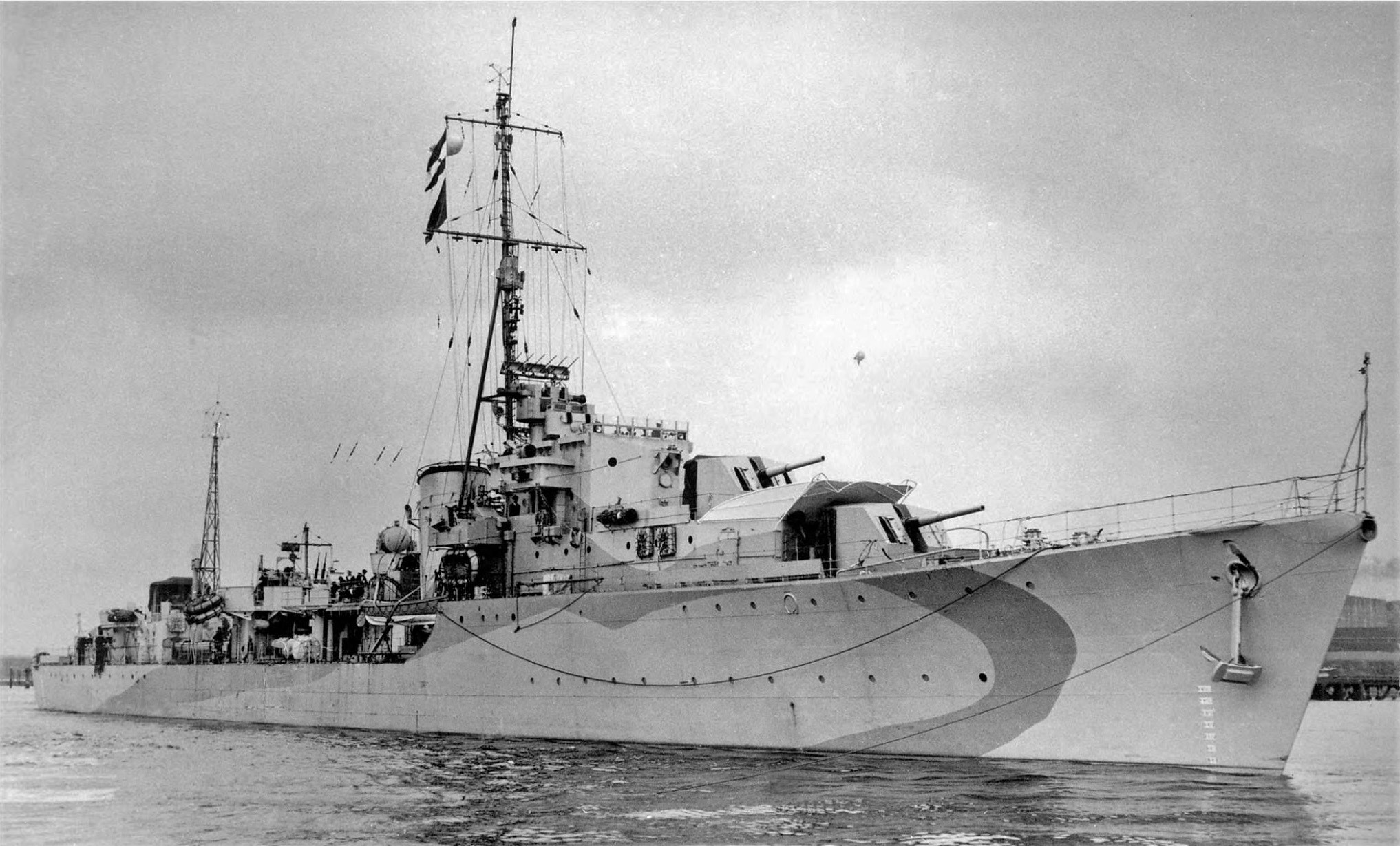
S class destroyer HMS Saumarez

At 01:05, Venus, parallel to Haguro as she raced past the north-westernmost ship in Power's force, found herself in a perfect attacking position. But the Torpedo Control Officer aboard Venus had made the wrong angle settings on her eight tubes, the opportunity was lost and Venus heeled hard over to port to clear the target area but still maintain the encirclement. Haguro, thinking Venus had launched torpedoes, altered course away to comb the tracks. In so doing, she turned south and deeper into the trap.

Saumarez and Verulam were now well positioned to make their attacks. Haguro appeared fine off Saumarez's port bow at a range of 6,000 yards (3.4 miles), each ship closing at 30 knots. At the same time, the Japanese destroyer Kamikaze appeared off the starboard bow, crossing from starboard to port, only 3,000 yards away and on a collision course. Saumarez's second salvo from her two forward, radar-controlled 4.7 inch guns struck Kamikaze and 40mm Bofors shells from the British ship's aft twin-mounting ripped the 320 ft length of the Japanese destroyer as Saumarez heeled to starboard. Haguro now fired her first broadside of eight 200 mm (8 inch) and four 120 mm (4.7 inch) guns at Saumarez. Tremendous waterspouts thrown up alongside swamped the British flotilla leader's upper decks as Haguro was seen clearly three miles away in the light of both sides' star-shells.

At 01:11, just as she was about to fire torpedoes, Saumarez was hit. The top of her funnel disappeared over the side and a 120 mm shell penetrated No. 1 Boiler Room, severed a steam main and lodged inside the boiler. Five men were scalded, two of whom died, but as with the 200 mm shell hit, this shell failed to explode at such close range and was later thrown overboard.

At 01:15, Haguro was hit by three torpedoes from Saumarez and Verulam. As Saumarez limped northward from the immediate battle area, a violent explosion created confusion. Power thought it was Kamikaze blowing up and men on Virago and Vigilant thought it was Saumarez, but it was probably two torpedoes colliding. Another possibility would be a Japanese torpedo, which had a much larger warhead than allied torpedoes, exploding in the wake of a ship. Historian Samuel Eliot Morison records at least two such episodes earlier in the war. Venus hit Haguro with one torpedo at 01:25, and Virago stopped Haguro with two more torpedo hits two minutes later. The Japanese cruiser finally sank at 02:06 after receiving another torpedo from Vigilant, two more from Venus, and nearly an hour of gunfire from the 26th Flotilla.

Saumarez's main aerial and a funnel top had been shot away, and an 200 mm shell nicked the forecastle. Two men were killed and three burned in the boiler room when a 120 mm shell severed the main steam pipe. There was no damage to the remainder of the 26th Flotilla.

== Aftermath ==
Kamikaze was also damaged, but escaped, returning the next day to rescue survivors. About 320 survived, but over 900 died, including the Japanese commanders, Vice-Admiral Shintaro Hashimoto and Rear-Admiral Kaju Sugiura.

This was one of the last major surface gun and torpedo actions of World War II. Lord Louis Mountbatten, himself a distinguished destroyer captain, described it in his Report to the Combined Chiefs of Staff (CCS) as 'an outstanding example of a night attack by destroyers.'

== Shipwreck ==
The wreck was discovered sitting upright in 2003 and partially explored by a group of specialised shipwreck divers aboard MV Empress. In 2010 another diving expedition, also aboard MV Empress, surveyed the wreck in detail. In 2014, the wreck was ravaged by illegal salvagers for scrap metal.

== Notes ==
=== References ===
- Chen, Peter (2004–2007). "Haguro". World War II Database.
- Hackett, Bob; Sander Kingsepp (1997–2006). "HIJMS Haguro: Tabular Record of Movement". (Combinedfleet.com). Archived from the original on 10 March 2007.
- Hough, Stan (1998). "H.M.S. VIGILANT. 1945". Stan Hough. Archived from the original on 10 July 2007. – Firsthand account of the battle by a member of HMS Vigilant's crew.
- Lacroix, Eric; Linton Wells (1997). Japanese Cruisers of the Pacific War. Naval Institute Press. ISBN 0-87021-311-3.
- Muir, Dan. "Order of Battle, Battle off Penang (Loss of IJN Haguro)". (navweaps.com).
- Nevitt, Allyn D. (1998). "IJN Kamikaze: Tabular Record of Movement". (Combinedfleet com). Archived from the original on 12 January 2007.
- Roskill, S. W. (1960). White Ensign, the British Navy At War, 1939–1945. Annapolis, MD: United States Naval Institute. OCLC 4092832.
- Winton, John (1969). The Forgotten Fleet. Michael Joseph. ISBN 0-7181-0643-1.
- Winton, John (1981). Sink the Haguro. Saunders of Toronto. ISBN 0-85422-152-2.
