= HMS Stronghold =

S class destroyer in WW II

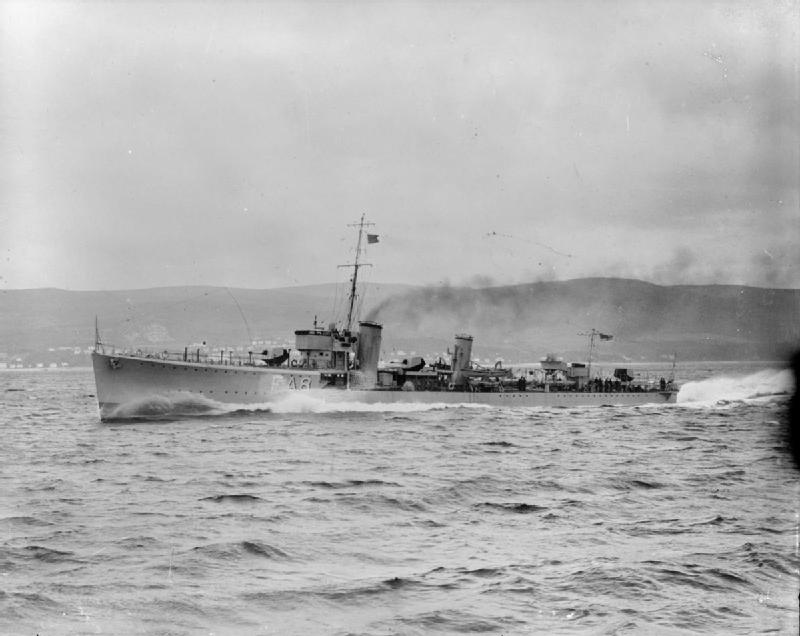
- HMS Stronghold undertaking trials in 1919

History

United Kingdom
- Name: HMS Stronghold
- Ordered: March 1918
- Builder: Scotts, Greenock
- Yard number: 494
- Laid down: March 1918
- Launched: 6 May 1919
- Completed: 2 July 1919
- Out of service: 2 March 1942
- Fate: Sunk in battle

General characteristics
- Class & type: S-class destroyer
- Displacement: 1,075 long tons (1,092 t) normal; 1,221 long tons (1,241 t) deep load
- Length: 265 ft (80.8 m) p.p.
- Beam: 26 ft 8 in (8.13 m)
- Draught: 9 ft 10 in (3.00 m) mean
- Propulsion: 3 Yarrow boilers; 2 geared Parsons steam turbines, 27,000 shp
- Speed: 36 knots (41.4 mph; 66.7 km/h)
- Range: 2,750 nmi (5,090 km) at 15 kn (28 km/h)
- Complement: 90
- Armament: 3 × QF 4-inch (101.6 mm) Mark IV guns, mounting P Mk. IX; 1 × single 2-pounder (40-mm) "pom-pom" Mk. II anti-aircraft gun; 4 × 21 in (533 mm) torpedo tubes (2×2)

HMS Stronghold was an S-class destroyer, which served with the Royal Navy during the Second World War. The ship was one of the first vehicles to deploy an unmanned aircraft. Launched on 6 May 1919, the destroyer was fitted with a simple catapult in 1924, which used a bag of sand as a weight, and launched the RAE 1921 Target, an early form of unmanned aircraft. A more sophisticated cordite catapult was fitted in 1927 and used to launch the more advanced RAE Larynx. In total, more than twenty test flights were undertaken before the catapult was removed. The destroyer was subsequently fitted out as a minelayer. At the start of the Second World War, the destroyer was based in Singapore. Stronghold helped to rescue the Supermarine Walrus from the battlecruiser Repulse, which had been sunk by the Japanese, in 1941 and, the following year, towed the destroyer Vendetta on the first part of the Royal Australian Navy vessel's journey to Fremantle. On 2 March 1942, the vessel was spotted by a Japanese reconnaissance seaplane and attacked by the heavy cruiser Maya, along with the two escorting destroyers Arashi and Nowaki. Heavily outgunned, the destroyer was sunk with the loss of nine officers and sixty-one ratings.

== Design and development ==
Stronghold was one of thirty-three Admiralty S class destroyers ordered by the British Admiralty in June 1917 as part of the Twelfth War Construction Programme. The design was a development of the R class introduced as a cheaper and faster alternative to the V and W class. Differences with the R class were minor, such as having the searchlight moved aft.

Stronghold had a overall length of 276 ft (84 m) and a length of 265 ft (81 m) between perpendiculars. Beam was 26 ft 8 in (8.13 m) and draught 9 ft 10 in (3.00 m). Displacement was 1,075 long tons (1,092 t) normal and 1,221 long tons (1,241 t) deep load. Three Yarrow boilers fed steam to two sets of Parsons geared steam turbines rated at 27,000 shaft horsepower (20,000 kW) and driving two shafts, giving a design speed of 36 knots (67 km/h; 41 mph) at normal loading and 32.5 knots (60.2 km/h; 37.4 mph) at deep load. Two funnels were fitted. The ship carried 301 long tons (306 t) of oil, which gave a design range of 2,750 nautical miles (5,090 km; 3,160 mi) at 15 knots (28 km/h; 17 mph). The ship had a complement of 90 officers and ratings.

Armament consisted of three QF 4-inch (102 mm) Mk IV guns on the ship's centreline. One was mounted raised on the forecastle, one between the funnels and one aft. The ship also mounted a single 40-millimetre (1.6 in) 2-pounder pom-pom anti-aircraft gun for air defence. Four 21-inch (533 mm) tubes were fitted in two twin rotating mounts aft. The ship was designed to mount two 18-inch (457 mm) tubes either side of the superstructure but this addition required the forecastle plating to be cut away, making the vessel very wet, so they were not fitted. The weight saved enabled the heavier Mark V 21-inch torpedo to be carried.

== Construction and career ==
=== Interwar service ===
Laid down in March 1918 by Scotts Shipbuilding and Engineering Company in Greenock with the yard number 494, Stronghold was launched on 6 May 1919. The vessel was the first, and only, of the name. Completed on 2 July 1919, the ship served in active duty for only a few days, being reduced to the Reserve Fleet at Portsmouth on 10 July. The vessel was recommissioned in Reserve at Portsmouth on 16 August 1920.

Unlike many of the class which suffered deterioration over the ensuing years, Stronghold was drafted into service as part of Naval experiments with the Royal Navy's first experiments with guided missiles. In 1924, the destroyer was equipped with a simple catapult to launch the RAE 1921 Target unmanned vehicle. First used on 3 September, 1924, despite the flight lasting only twelve minutes, this was the first Remote Piloted Vehicle (RPV) flown. The Target was successfully launched twelve times in the following two years. The aircraft was initially accelerated to launch by the simple process of dropping a large bag of water off the side of the ship. This was replaced by a more sophisticated catapult powered by cordite in 1927. The new catapult was used to test the more capable RAE Larynx, the first success launch taking place in the Bristol Channel on 20 July 1927. At the second launch, on 1 September, the aircraft is believed to have flown 100 mi (160 km), while the third and final flight, on 15 October, struck the ground 5 mi (8.0 km) from its target after travelling 112 mi (180 km). The catapult was subsequently removed. In July 1931, Stronghold, in reserve at Portsmouth was recommissioned to replace Tara as tender to the Torpedo School, with Tara's crew transferring to Stronghold. In 1938, Stronghold was equipped as a minelayer, capable of carrying thirty-eight mines as an alternative to the aft guns and torpedo tubes.

=== Second World War ===
At the start of the Second World War, Stronghold was based in Singapore. On 10 December 1941, the destroyer was once again involved in supporting aircraft, this time a Supermarine Walrus from the battlecruiser Repulse. The flying boat had been launched prior to the Japanese aerial attack that had sunk the capital ship and had been flying since. Stronghold took the aircraft in tow back to Singapore, the ASV radar mounted in the Walrus proving a useful security against submarine attack. On 16 January 1942, the destroyer formed part of the Far Eastern Squadron, or China Force, led by the light cruisers Danae, Dragon and Durban. The force was allocated to escorting convoys. On 3 February, Stronghold was tasked with towing the Royal Australian Navy destroyer Vendetta, which had been refitting in Singapore, on the first part of that vessel's journey to Fremantle.

Between 11 and 13 February, the destroyer helped escorting what has been termed the Empire Star Convoy, after the Blue Star Line refrigerated cargo ship Empire Star. Stronghold was then assigned to undertake an anti-submarine patrol off the coast of Cilacap. The ship sailed on 1 March, sweeping at 22 kn (41 km/h; 25 mph). The destroyer spotted the Dutch evacuee ship Zandaam and provided essential cover against submarines until the heavily laiden vessel steamed off at speed to Fremantle. The destroyer itself then set off for Onslow, Western Australia. Unable to refuel at Cilacap, the destroyer was short of fuel and so had cruise at an economic speed of between 12 and 15 kn (22 and 28 km/h; 14 and 17 mph).

The ship was sighted at about 09:00 on 2 March by a Japanese reconnaissance seaplane 300 mi (480 km) south of Bali. The seaplane reported the position of the British vessel to the Japanese fleet. As 17:05, the first shell splashes appeared to the starboard. By 17:43, the destroyer was being attacked by the heavy cruiser Maya, which was being accompanied by Atago and Takao, escorted by the destroyers Arashi and Nowaki. Maya opened fire at a range of 16,300 yards (14,900 m) with 8-inch (200 mm) shells, the destroyers at 11,300 yards (10,300 m) with their 5-inch (130 mm) guns. Stronghold returning fire soon after. Heavily outgunned, the destroyer sustained damage aft, in the forward mess and the engine room, which had to be abandoned. The Japanese destroyers then attacked with torpedoes, one of which crippled the ship. The crew abandoned ship and Stronghold sank at 19:00. The cruiser expended 635 rounds, Nowaki 345 rounds and Arashi 290 rounds in the sinking.

The crew had to rely on Carley floats as the ship's lifeboats had been destroyed in the action. The four floats separated and drifted in the open sea for three days. Fifty survivors were rescued by a Dutch steamer with a Japanese crew on 5 March, who were then transferred to a Japanese cruiser and interned as prisoners of war. In all, nine officers and sixty-one ratings were killed, with an additional two subsequently dying in the camp.

== Pennant numbers ==
Penant numbers
Pennant number	Date
FA6	December 1919
H50	March 1942
