= RAE Larynx =

Early British pilotless aircraft

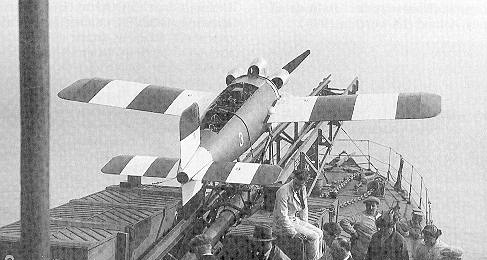
RAE Larynx on a cordite-fired catapult of the destroyer HMS Stronghold in July 1927. The man on the box is Dr. George Gardner, later Director of the RAE.

The Royal Aircraft Establishment Larynx (from "Long Range Gun with Lynx engine") was an early British pilotless aircraft, to be used as a guided anti-ship weapon. Started in September 1925, it was an early cruise missile guided by an autopilot.

== Background ==
Using an unmanned aircraft full of explosives, guided by radio, was an idea that emerged during the First World War. The Royal Aircraft Factory had experimented with monoplane aircraft, launched into the air, from a track and guided by an autopilot, the principles of which had been developed by Professor Archibald Low. The Ruston Proctor AT (Aerial Target, a name intended to disguise its purpose) was a radio controlled biplane designed by Henry Folland, to bring down German Zeppelin airships. The aircraft proved mediocre when it was demonstrated and was dropped.

In May 1919 the Admiralty asked the Air Ministry for a target aeroplane, flown by remote-control, for anti-aircraft practice. The Royal Aircraft Establishment began tests of a small monoplane, similar to the earlier Royal Aircraft Factory design. Trials began in 1922 of pilotless aeroplanes launched from ships and controlled by wireless from there or from another aircraft nearby. By 1925 the research was advanced enough for the Admiralty and Air Ministry to contemplate using such an aircraft for attacks on targets in the air and on the ground.

With no need to protect a pilot, no need for defensive measures, an unmanned bomber would cost less, fly faster, further and carry more bombs in any weather, to drop bombs or crash on a target. With no need to land, an undercarriage would not be necessary and with no problem of control at low speed, the maximum speed could be much higher. A weapon like this would be useful against the most elaborately defended targets or it could be used as a decoy, reducing the risk of sending manned bombers. The possibility that other countries were working along similar lines suggested that Britain also had to work on counter-measures.

== Design ==
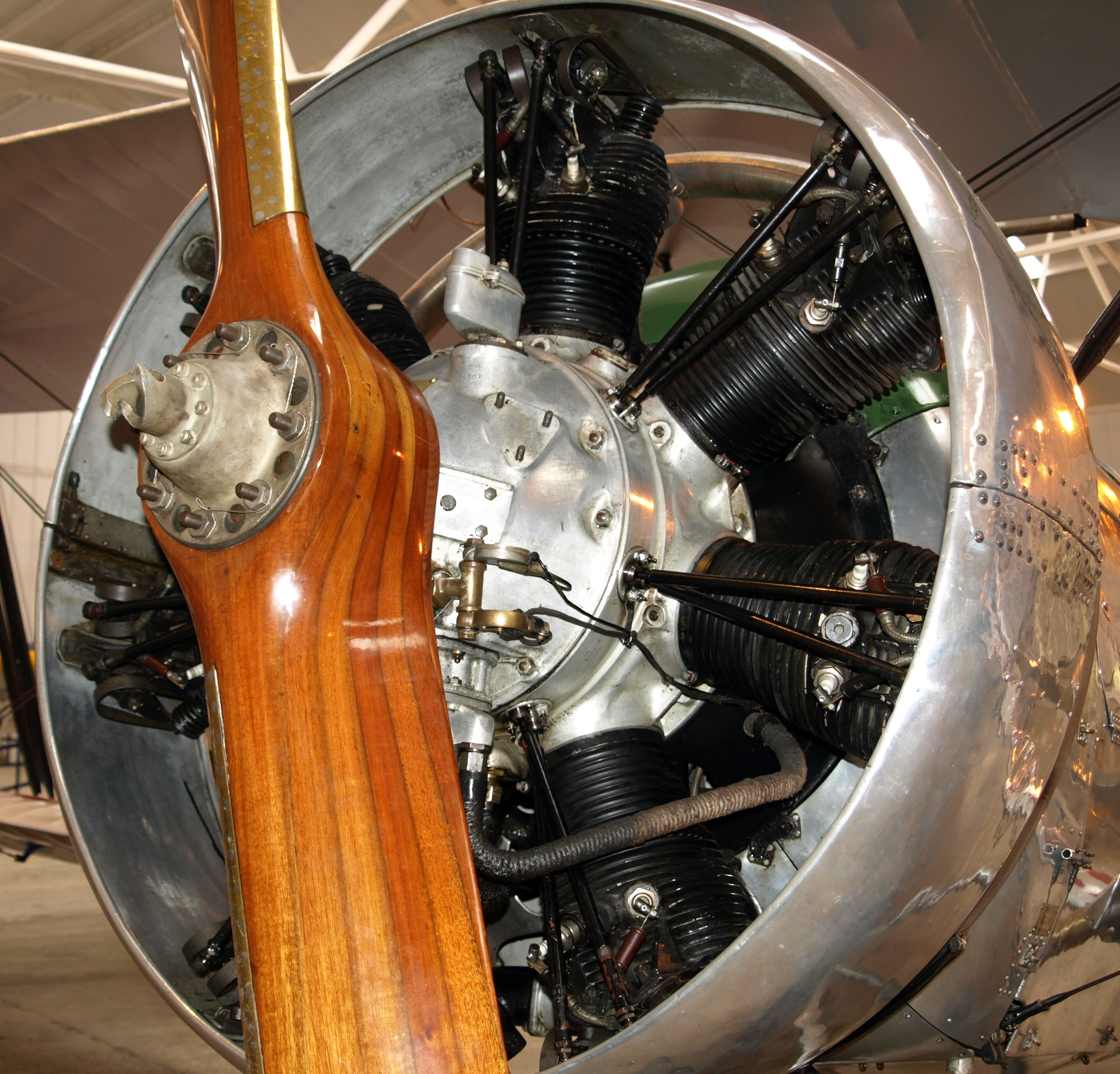
Example of an Armstrong Siddeley Lynx engine

In 1925, the RAE was ordered to build a prototype anti-shipping missile that could fly at 190 mph (310 km/h) with 100 lb (45 kg) of explosives, soon increased to 200 lb (91 kg) for 200 to 300 mi (320 to 480 km) not dissimilar to the bomb-load of the new Fairey Fox. The aircraft that emerged was the Larynx, a small monoplane powered by a 200 hp (150 kW) Armstrong Siddeley Lynx IV engine, that gave it a maximum speed of 200 mph (320 km/h) faster than contemporary fighter aircraft. The aircraft had the autopilot that had been developed by Professor Archibald Low during the First World War.

Just before testing began the Admiralty dropped a requirement for radio control in favour of an autopilot and a device powered by the engine to measure distance flown. Wireless control needed the operator to see the Larynx but the navy wanted a flying bomb that was not reliant on another aircraft carrying the operator, since a 'shepherding' aircraft would not always be available. The cost of this was a dramatic loss of the accuracy needed to hit a ship, especially at 300 mi (480 km).

=== Testing ===
Tests were conducted from 1927 to 1929 with Larynxes carrying half fuel to limit range and launched from a ramp on a ship in the Bristol Channel. The tests convinced the Air Ministry that the Larynx could be a practical weapon, with the possibility that radio remote-control would improve its accuracy. The Air Ministry became much less enthusiastic about the Admiralty requirement for a radio-controlled target because of its potential as a weapon. If the research could be kept secret, "their effect on the course of a war, coming as a surprise, might be very great and far-reaching". Advertising the existence of such a device for the navy to try to shoot down, would give away a secret weapon.

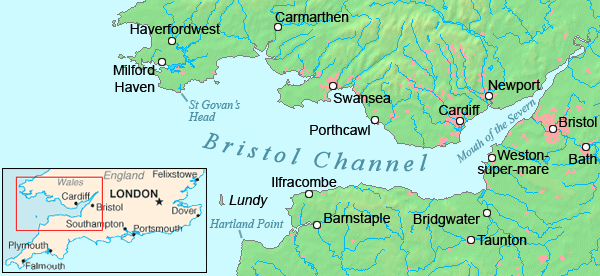
Map of the Bristol Channel

The first test took place on 20 July 1927, with the Larynx launched from a cordite-powered catapult on HMS Stronghold an S-class destroyer. The Larynx crashing into the Bristol Channel; in the second test, on 1 September 1927, the Larynx was catapulted and thought to have flown 100 mi (160 km) before being lost. Another test took place on 15 October 1927 when a Larynx flew for 112 mi (180 km) at 193 mph (311 km/h) and hit 5 mi (8.0 km) from the target. In September 1928 a catapult launch from HMS Thanet, another S-class destroyer, flew for 50 mi (80 km).

Another launch from Thanet in October 1928 also flew for 50 mi (80 km). In May 1929 two ground launches from Portland were tried, one flew over the target and the other hit it. Ship crews under the impression that the aircraft was manned, had tried to rescue aircrew from test aircraft that crashed into the sea. To keep the research into pilotless aircraft secret, testing was moved to RAF Shaibah, near Basra in Iraq, to fly Larynxes with live explosives on board. Larynx launches in August and September 1929 were disappointing, flying only 27 mi (43 km), 60 mi (97 km) and 32 mi (51 km). In October a Larynx crashed on launch and another flew 22 mi (35 km).

The radio-guided target aircraft concept was allowed to drift to the bottom of the Air Ministry priority list. By the end of the 1920s a practical system using an autopilot was near ready but only if the intention was to carry 200 lb (91 kg) as far as Paris. A 300 mi (480 km) range was possible but without radio control, the target would have to be extremely large. The RAE was very busy in the late 1920s, designing autopilots for manned bombers, lacked the means for research into more accurate guidance devices for pilotless aircraft and work on the Larynx was reduced to a long-term project; experiments were stopped in 1936.

== Specifications ==
General characteristics

- Crew: Nil
- Powerplant: 1 × Armstrong Siddeley Lynx IV radial engine, 200 hp (150 kW)
- Propellers: 2-bladed

Performance

- Maximum speed: 200 mph (320 km/h, 170 kn)

== See also ==
- Hewitt-Sperry Automatic Airplane
- Kettering Bug
- V-1 flying bomb
