= USS Craven (DD-382) =

Gridley-class destroyer

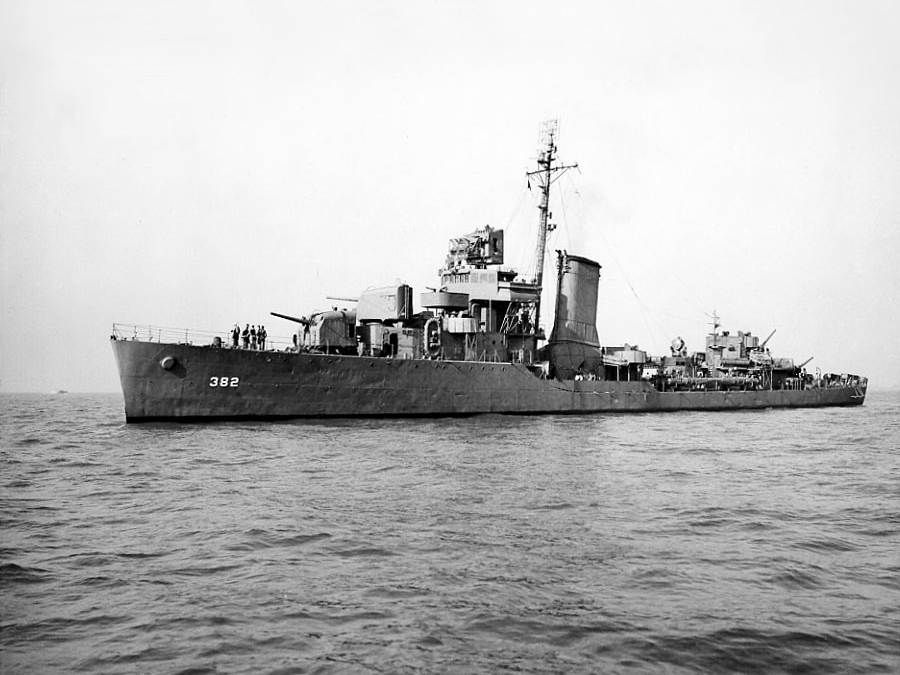
- USS Craven (DD-382) underway in November 1943.

History

United States
- Name: Craven
- Namesake: Tunis Augustus Macdonough Craven
- Builder: Bethlehem Shipbuilding Corporation's Fore River Shipyard in Quincy, Massachusetts
- Laid down: 2 June 1935
- Launched: 25 February 1937
- Commissioned: 2 September 1937
- Decommissioned: 19 April 1946
- Identification: DD-382
- Fate: Sold 2 October 1947

General characteristics
- Class & type: Gridley-class destroyer
- Displacement: 1590 tons, 2219 tons full
- Length: 340 ft 10 in (103.89 m)
- Beam: 35 ft 10 in (10.92 m)
- Draught: 12 ft 9 in (3.89 m)
- Propulsion: 50,000 shp (37,000 kW) Bethlehem geared turbines, 2 screws
- Speed: 38.5 knots (71.3 km/h; 44.3 mph)
- Range: 6,500 nmi (12,000 km; 7,500 mi) at 12 kn (22 km/h; 14 mph)
- Complement: 158
- Armament: 4 x 5 in (127 mm)/38 cal. guns; 4 x .50 cal (12.7 mm) machine guns; 16 x 21 inch (533 mm) torpedo tubes

USS Craven (DD-382) was a Gridley-class destroyer commissioned in the United States Navy from 1937 to 1946. She served in the Pacific War and was scrapped in 1947.

== History ==
Craven was the third U.S. Navy ship named for Tunis Augustus Macdonough Craven. She was launched on 25 February 1937 by Bethlehem Shipbuilding Corporation's Fore River Shipyard in Quincy, Massachusetts; sponsored by Mrs. F. Learned, daughter of Commander Craven, and commissioned on 2 September 1937.

After training in the Caribbean and along the east coast and experimental torpedo firing at Newport, Rhode Island, Craven departed Norfolk, Virginia on 16 August 1938 to join the fleet at San Diego, California. From 4 January to 17 July 1939 she cruised to the Caribbean on maneuvers and fleet problems, and to the east coast for visits, but otherwise operated off the west coast. From 1 April 1940 she was based at Pearl Harbor where she joined in fleet exercises and served as antisubmarine screen for carriers.

When the Japanese attacked Pearl Harbor, Craven was at sea with Enterprise proceeding from Wake Island to Pearl Harbor. While still with the Enterprise group, Craven was damaged when she collided with the cruiser Northampton during underway refueling on 15 December. That incident, coupled with more damage inflicted from heavy seas on 19 December, necessitated her return to Pearl Harbor.

Craven joined in the raids on the Marshalls and Gilberts, 1 February 1942 and on Wake Island, 24 February. After overhaul on the west coast, on 8 April she returned to convoy duty and west coast operations.

Craven sailed from Pearl Harbor 12 November 1942 to join in the struggle for Guadalcanal, escorting transports to that island for the next nine months. On 6 and 7 August 1943 she joined in the sweep of Vella Gulf which sank Japanese destroyers Kawakaze, Hagikaze and Arashi, and damaged a cruiser.

Craven departed Efate 23 September 1943 for San Francisco, California and overhaul. Returning to Pearl Harbor, she sortied 19 January 1944 to screen the carriers of TF 58 during air strikes on Wotje, Taroa, and Eniwetok in February supporting the invasion of the Marshall Islands. From the base at Majuro, Craven sailed to screen carriers in heavy strikes on Palau, Yap, Ulithi, Woleai; covered the invasion of Hollandia; and raided Truk, Satawan, and Ponape through April. After a voyage to Pearl Harbor in May, Craven rejoined the 5th Fleet for the invasion of the Marianas. She screened the softening up strikes on Guam, Saipan, and Rota, and the supporting raids on the Bonins, as well as guarded the carriers with protective antiaircraft fire during the Battle of the Philippine Sea on 19 and 20 June. Craven continued to guard the carriers during the air strikes of July, August and September on the Bonins, Guam, Yap, and the Palaus.

Returning to Pearl Harbor 11 October 1944, Craven had overhaul and training, then sailed from Pearl Harbor 2 January 1945. She arrived at New York 26 January for exercises and antisubmarine patrol on the east coast until 2 May when she sailed to Southampton, England, as convoy escort, returning to New York 29 May. She departed Portland, Maine, 22 June to carry the U.S. Minister to Tangier, and continued to Oran.

Craven ranged throughout the Mediterranean Sea on escort, training, and transport duties until 14 January 1946 when she cleared for New York, arriving 28 January. She weighed anchor 20 February for San Diego and Pearl Harbor where she arrived 16 March.

== Fate ==
Craven was decommissioned there 19 April 1946, and sold 2 October 1947.

== Honors ==
Craven received nine battle stars for World War II service.
