= Battle of Vella Gulf =

Naval battle of the New Georgia campaign during World War II

- Part of the Pacific Theater of World War II
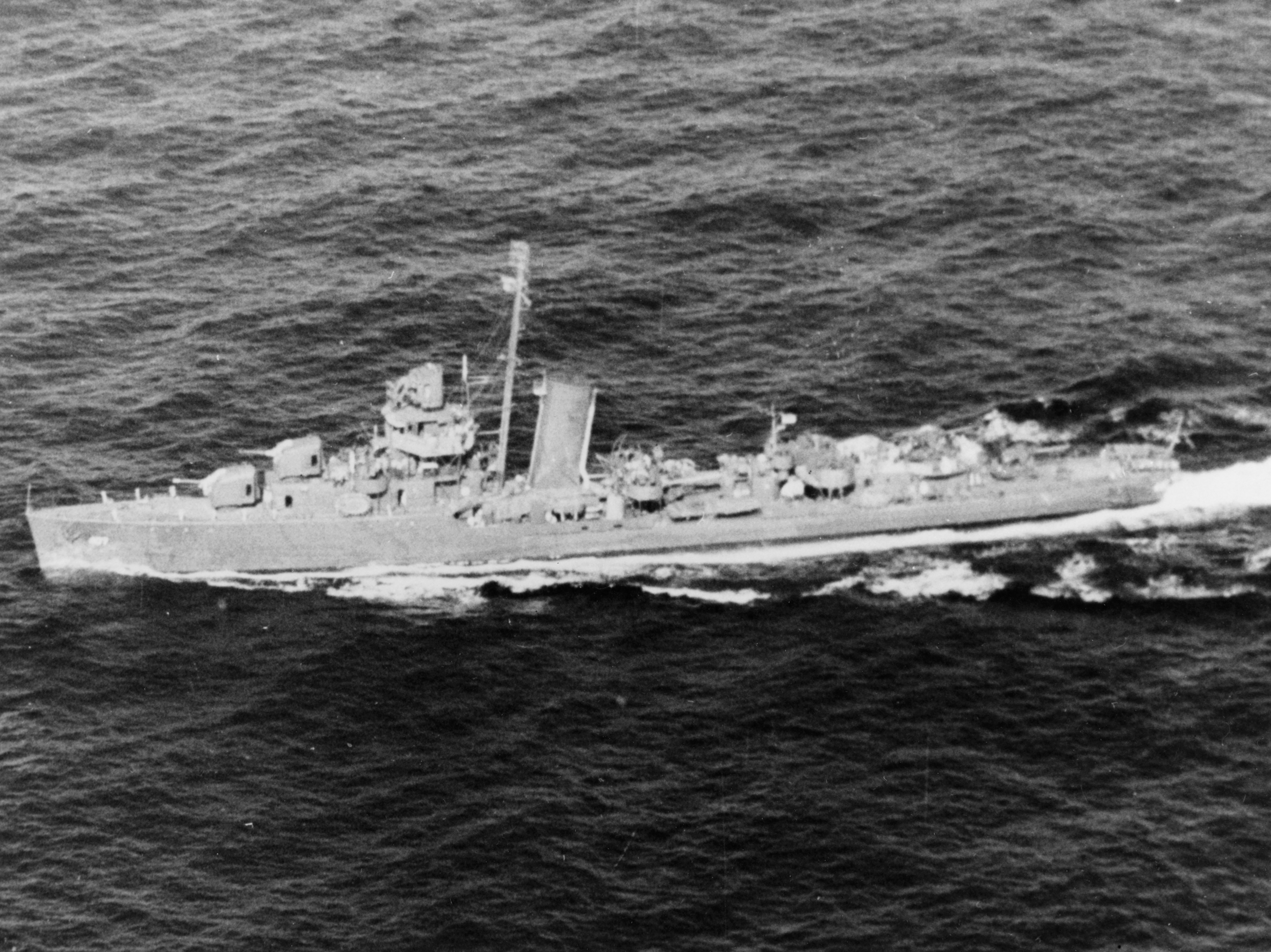
- The U.S. destroyer Sterett.
Date	6–7 August 1943
Location	Near Kolombangara in the Solomon Islands 7.90°S 156.82°E
Result	American victory

Belligerents
United States	Japan

Commanders and leaders
(United States) Frederick Moosbrugger	(Empire of Japan) Kaju Sugiura

Units involved
(United States) Task Group 31.2	(Empire of Japan) Destroyer Division 4

Strength
6 destroyers	4 destroyers

Casualties and losses
None	3 destroyers sunk, 1,210 killed

The Battle of Vella Gulf (ベラ湾夜戦, Berawan yasen) was a naval battle of the Pacific campaign of World War II fought on the night of 6–7 August 1943 in Vella Gulf between Vella Lavella and Kolombangara in the Solomon Islands of the southwest Pacific.

This engagement was the first time that American destroyers were allowed to operate independently of the American cruiser force during the Pacific campaign.

In the battle, six American destroyers had intelligence that a Japanese group was coming to Vella Gulf on that night, and laid in wait for them. In the battle, six American destroyers engaged four Japanese destroyers attempting to reinforce Japanese troops on Kolombangara. The American warships closed the Japanese force undetected with the aid of radar and fired torpedoes, sinking three Japanese destroyers with no damage to American ships.

== Background ==
After their victory in the Battle of Kolombangara on 13 July 1943, the Japanese had established a powerful garrison of 12,400 around Vila on the southern tip of Kolombangara in an attempt to block further island hopping by the American forces, which had taken Guadalcanal the previous year as part of Operation Cartwheel. Vila was the principal port on Kolombangara, and it was supplied at night using fast destroyer transport runs the Americans called the "Tokyo Express". Three supply runs—on 19 July, 29 July, and 1 August—were completed.

During the final run on 1 August, a force of 15 U.S. PT boats launched an unsuccessful attack, firing between 26 and 30 torpedoes. Four Japanese destroyers responded, and in the ensuing battle PT-109, captained by Lieutenant John F. Kennedy, later President of the United States, was rammed and sunk by Amagiri. By 5 August, the Americans were driving towards the Japanese-held airfield at Munda on New Georgia just south of Kolombangara, and the Japanese decided to send a fourth transport run to Vila with reinforcements.

== Battle ==
On the night of 6 August, the Imperial Japanese Navy sent a force of four destroyers under Captain Kaju Sugiura—2 Kagero-class: Hagikaze, Arashi and 2 Shiratsuyu-class: Kawakaze of Sugiara's own Destroyer Division 4 and Shigure of Captain Tameichi Hara's Destroyer Division 27—carrying about 950 soldiers and their supplies. The Japanese airfield at Munda, which the force at Vila was assigned to reinforce, was on the verge of being captured; it actually fell later that day. The Imperial Japanese commanders expected that Vila would become the center of their next line of defense. The Japanese operational plan specified the same approach route through Vella Gulf as the three previous successful transport runs over the objections of Hara, who argued that repeating prior operations was courting disaster.

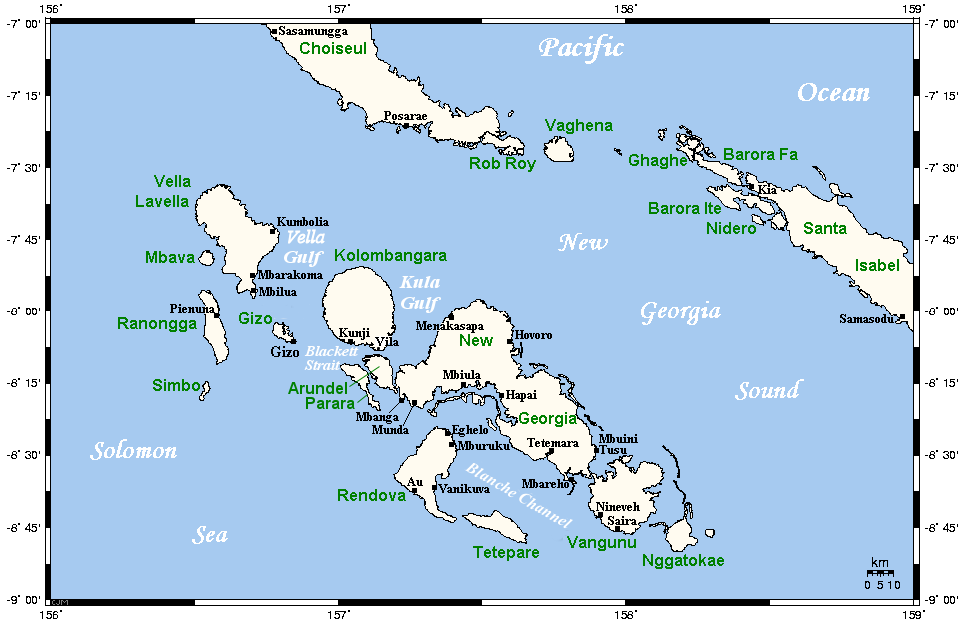
New Georgia Islands. The Vella Gulf lies between Vella Lavella and Kolombangara on the western side of the chain.

The U.S. Navy Task Group 31.2 (TG 31.2) of six destroyers—USS Dunlap, Craven, Maury, Lang, Sterett, and Stack—commanded by Commander Frederick Moosbrugger, having been forewarned of the Japanese operation, was dispatched to intercept the Japanese force. The morale of Moosbrugger's crews was buoyed by the realization that at last they would be free of the combat doctrine that required them to stick close to the cruisers; on this night, they would be able to apply their own tactics.

The U.S. ships made radar contact with the Japanese force at 23:33 on 6 August. Moosbrugger's battle plan divided his forces into two divisions. Moosbrugger's own Destroyer Division 12 (Dunlap, Craven and Maury), whose ships retained their full pre-war torpedo batteries, was to launch a surprise torpedo attack out of the shadow of Kolombangara. Meanwhile, Commander Roger Simpson's Destroyer Division 15 (Lang, Sterett and Stack), whose ships had exchanged some of their torpedo tubes for extra 40 mm guns, was to cover Moosbrugger's division from an overwatch position, turning to cross the enemy's course. The idea was that any attempt by the Japanese to turn into the first division's torpedo attack would expose their broadsides to torpedo attack from the second division.

The two divisions could then switch roles if a repeat torpedo attack proved necessary, or alternate roles if barges were encountered, which could be dealt with by the second division's extra guns if necessary. Having learned the harsh lessons of naval combat at night after the Battle of Kolombangara, the Battle of Kula Gulf, and a previous PT boat skirmish, and having finally addressed the technical problems that had plagued their Mark 15 torpedoes since the beginning of the war, the American destroyers did not give away their position with gunfire until their torpedoes started striking their targets.

Dunlap, Craven and Maury fired a total of 24 torpedoes in the space of 63 seconds before turning to starboard and withdrawing at high speed, using the mountainous island to their east to help camouflage their movements. The Americans were operating on the assumption that the Japanese had nothing to match their new centimetric SG radar; they knew that their older meter band radars could not differentiate between the surface ships and the island and presumed Japanese radars were no better. In the event, none of the Japanese ships present actually had radar, and the looming mass of the island served to conceal the American ships from visual observation. Lang, Sterett and Stack turned to port to cross their opponent's T and opened fire as soon as the torpedoes started detonating. All four Japanese destroyers were hit by American torpedoes. Hagikaze, Arashi, and Kawakaze burst into flames and either sank immediately or were quickly sunk by naval gunfire. The torpedo that hit Shigure was a dud that passed through her rudder without detonating, allowing her to escape into the darkness. Shigure fired eight torpedoes while it retreated from the scene, all of which missed their targets.

== Aftermath ==
Most of the Japanese soldiers and sailors left floating in the water after their ships sank refused rescue by American ships. A total of 685 Japanese soldiers were lost, mostly by drowning. In addition, 356 sailors were lost on Hagikaze and Arashi (178 on each) and 169 on Kawakaze. A small group of 300 survivors reached Vella Lavella. They were later transferred to Kolombangara. During this battle, no U.S. ship was struck, with the only casualty being a crush injury to a gun loader caused by an accident.

The battle—coming less than one month after the night action at the Battle of Kolombangara—was the first time that the Japanese had been beaten in a night destroyer action. The six destroyers had accomplished what a squadron of 15 American PT boats could not shortly before: sink the Tokyo Express with torpedoes with no American or friendly navy losses. The Empire of Japan could no longer supply their garrison on Kolombangara, and the Allies bypassed it, landing instead on Vella Lavella to the west on 15 August. The Japanese Army soon abandoned Kolombangara, completing their withdrawal by early October.

Two of the US destroyer captains, Lieutenant Commanders Clifton Iverson (Dunlap) and Frank Gardner Gould (Sterett), were later awarded the Navy Cross for their actions during the battle.

== Namesakes ==
The escort aircraft carrier USS Vella Gulf (CVE-111), in commission from 1945 to 1946, and the Ticonderoga-class guided-missile cruiser USS Vella Gulf (CG-72), in commission from 1993 to 2022, were named for this battle.
