= USS Dunlap =

Mahan-class destroyer

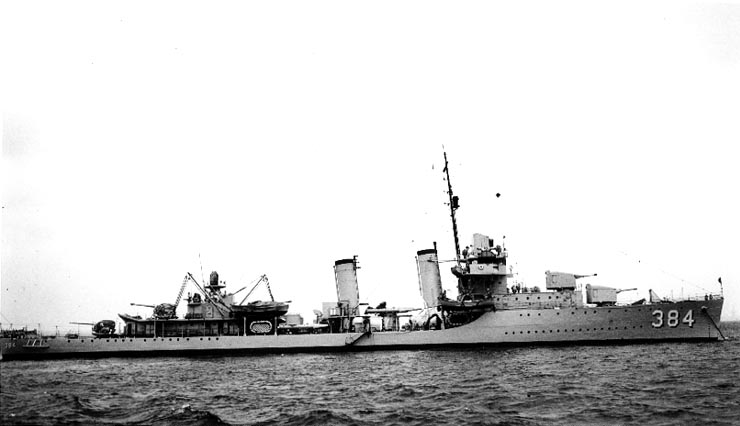
- USS Dunlap (DD-384)

History

United States
- Namesake: Robert H. Dunlap, USMC
- Builder: United Shipyards, Inc., Staten Island, New York City
- Laid down: 10 April 1935
- Launched: 18 April 1936
- Commissioned: 12 June 1937
- Decommissioned: 14 December 1945
- Fate: Sold 31 December 1947

General characteristics
- Class & type: Mahan-class destroyer
- Displacement: 1,490 tons
- Length: 341 ft 4 in (104 m)
- Beam: 35 ft (10.7 m)
- Draft: 17 ft (5.182 m)
- Speed: 37 knots (69 km/h)
- Complement: 158 officers and crew
- Armament: As Built: 1 × Gun Director above bridge, 5 × 5"(127mm)/38cal DP (5x1), 12 × 21 inch (533 mm) T Tubes (3x4), 4 × .50cal (12.7mm) MG AA (4x1), 2 × depth charge stern racks, c1944: 1 × Mk37 Gun Fire Control System, 4 × 5" (127mm)/38cal DP (4x1), 12 × 21 inch (533 mm) T Tubes (3x4), 2 × Mk51 Gun Directors, 4 × Bofors 40 mm AA (2x2), 6 × Oerlikon 20 mm AA (6x1), 2 × depth charge roll-off stern racks, 4 × K-gun depth charge projectors

USS Dunlap (DD–384) was a Mahan-class destroyer in the United States Navy before and during World War II. She was named after Brigadier General Robert H. Dunlap, USMC. In some references, she is listed as a Dunlap-class destroyer. Captain was Clifton Iverson, who earned the Navy Cross during the Battle of Vella Gulf

== History ==
Dunlap was launched 18 April 1936 by United Shipyards, Inc., New York, New York; sponsored by Mrs Katherine Wood Dunlap, widow of Brigadier General Dunlap and commissioned 12 June 1937.

Dunlap operated along the east coast on training duty and in June 1938 served as an escort at Philadelphia, Pennsylvania for the MS Kungsholm, carrying the Crown Prince of Sweden. On 1 September she got underway for the west coast; except for a cruise to the Caribbean and east coast for a fleet problem and overhaul in the first 6 months of 1939, Dunlap served along the west coast until 2 April 1940 when she sailed for Pearl Harbor, her new homeport.

== World War II ==
On 7 December 1941, during the attack on Pearl Harbor, Dunlap was at sea bound for Pearl Harbor with TF 8 after ferrying aircraft to Wake Island. She entered Pearl Harbor the next day and patrolled in the Hawaiian area until 11 January 1942 when she sortied with TF 8 for airstrikes on the Marshall Islands, returning 5 February. After taking part in the raid on Wake Island on 24 February, she continued to patrol in the Hawaiian area until 22 March, then escorted convoys between various ports on the west coast until returning to Pearl Harbor on 22 October 1942.

Dunlap arrived at Noumea, New Caledonia, 5 December 1942 and operated from that base on training and patrol duty and as escort for convoys between, Fiji, Tonga and New Hebrides Islands until arriving at Guadalcanal 30 July 1943 for duty in the Solomon Islands. On the night of 6/7 August, she along with five other destroyers intercepted a Japanese force carrying reinforcements to Kolombangara. In the resulting battle, a night torpedo action, the task group sank three Japanese destroyers and drove the fourth back to its base at Buin, without suffering any damage.

After overhaul at San Diego, California, Dunlap sailed 23 November 1943 for patrol duty out of Adak, Alaska until 16 December when she left for Pearl Harbor, arriving 5 days later. She joined the 5th Fleet to screen carriers in strikes of the Marshall Islands operations from 19 January to 4 March 1944, then touched at Espiritu Santo briefly before sailing for Fremantle, Australia, to rendezvous with the British Eastern Fleet. After training here and at Trincomalee, Ceylon, she took part in the strikes on the Soerabaja area of Java on 17 May and next day sailed for Pearl Harbor, arriving 10 June.

Dunlap returned to San Francisco 7 July 1944 to join the screen for Baltimore (CA-68) carrying President Franklin D. Roosevelt for conferences and inspections with top Pacific commanders of Pearl Harbor and Alaskan bases. Detached from this task group at Seattle on 12 August, Dunlap returned to Pearl Harbor. She sailed 1 September, shelled Wake Island 3 September and arrived at Saipan 12 September for duty with the Marianas Patrol and Escort Group.

Dunlap took part in the bombardment of Marcus Island on 9 October. On 16 October 1944, she rendezvoused with the 3rd Fleet units for strikes on Luzon, then supported the landings at Leyte. When the Japanese forces made a three-pronged attack on the Philippines, she was underway for Ulithi but reversed course to screen TG 38.1 in its attacks of 25 and 26 October on the enemy fleeing after the Battle for Leyte Gulf. Dunlap arrived at Ulithi 29 October for patrol duty and took part in bombardments on Iwo Jima in November and December 1944 and January 1945. She returned to Iwo Jima on 19 March to support its occupation and until the end of the war patrolled to intercept Japanese ships attempting to evacuate the Bonins. On 19 June she sank an enemy craft attempting to evacuate Chichi Jima, picking up 52 survivors. Japanese officers came on board on 31 August to discuss surrender terms for the Bonin Islands and returned on 3 September to sign the surrender.

== Fate ==
Dunlap sailed for Iwo Jima 19 September 1945, touched at San Pedro, California and arrived at Houston, Texas, for Navy Day. She arrived at Norfolk, Virginia 7 November where she was decommissioned 14 December 1945 and was sold 31 December 1947.

Dunlap received six battle stars for World War II service.

As of 2012, no other ship has been named USS Dunlap.
