= USS Winslow (DD-359) =

Porter-class destroyer

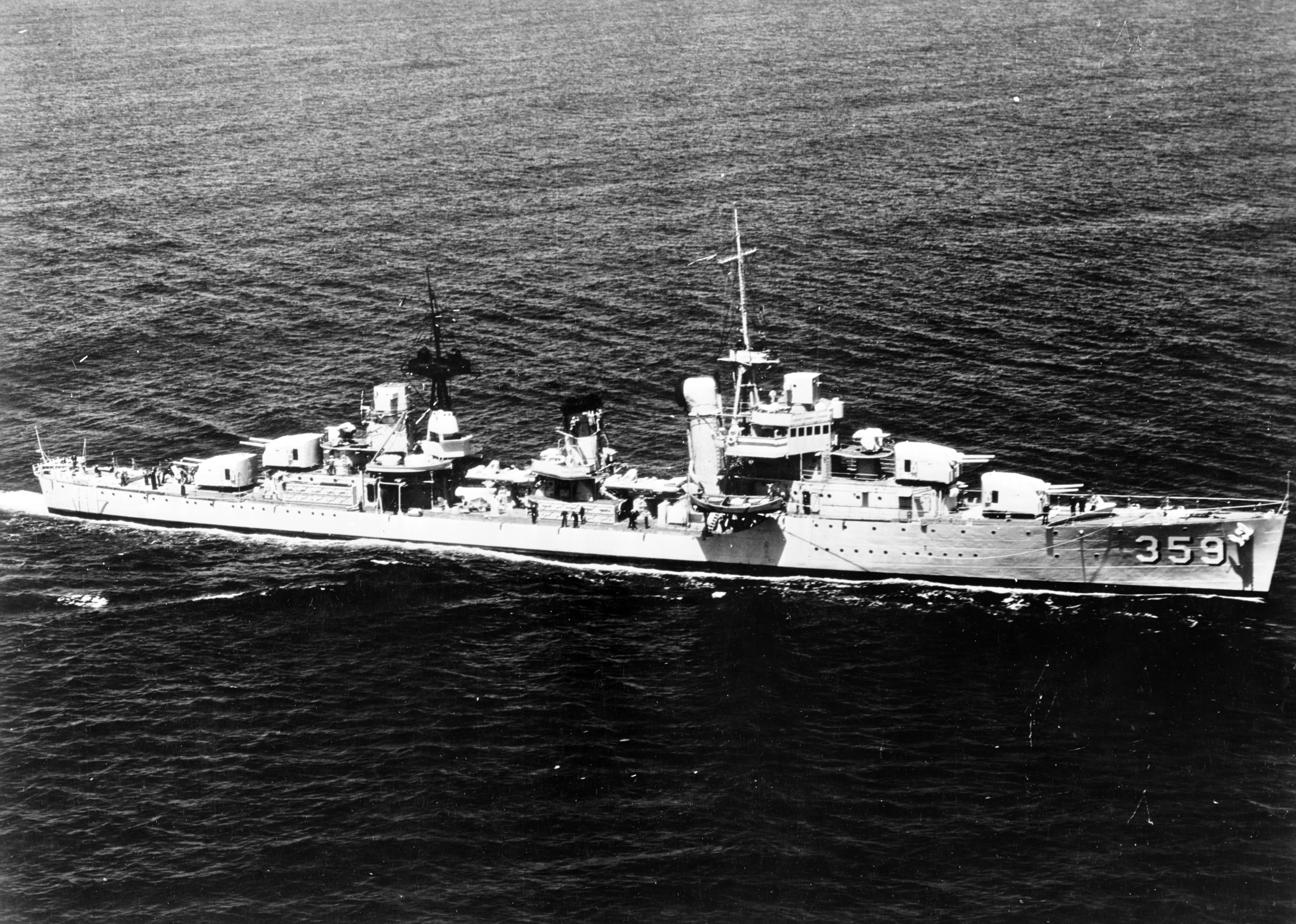
- USS Winslow c. late 1930s

History

United States
- Name: Winslow
- Namesake: Rear Admiral John Ancrum Winslow and Cameron McRae Winslow
- Builder: New York Shipbuilding Corporation, Camden, New Jersey
- Laid down: 18 December 1933
- Launched: 21 September 1936
- Commissioned: 17 February 1937
- Decommissioned: 28 June 1950
- Stricken: 5 December 1957
- Identification: Hull number: DD-359/AG-127
- Fate: Sold for scrapping, 23 February 1959

General characteristics
- Class & type: Porter-class destroyer
- Displacement: 1,850 tons
- Length: 381 ft (116 m)
- Beam: 36 ft 2 in (11.02 m)
- Draught: 16 ft 6 in (5.03 m)
- Speed: 35 knots (65 km/h; 40 mph)
- Complement: 238 officers and enlisted
- Armament: As built: 2 × Mk33 Gun Fire Control System; 8 × 5-inch (127 mm)/38 cal. SP (4×2), 8 × 21-inch (533 mm) torpedo tubes (2×4); 8 × 1.1-inch (28 mm)/75 cal. AA (2×4); 2 × .50-caliber (12.7 mm) machine guns; 2 depth charge stern racks; c. 1944: 1 × Mk37 Gun Fire Control System; 5 × 5-inch (127mm)/38 cal. DP (2×2,1×1); 16 × Bofors 40 mm AA (8×2); 4 × Oerlikon 20 mm AA (4x1); 2 × depth charge stern racks

USS Winslow (DD-359/AG-127) was a Porter-class destroyer in service with the United States Navy from 1937 to 1950. When Winslow was decommissioned in 1950, she was the last US destroyer constructed in the 1930s still in commission. Winslow was the also the last surviving U.S. destroyer commissioned during the 1930s before she was sold for scrap in 1959. Winslow was the 28th of 66 U.S. destroyers commissioned during the 1930s and the longest serving (13 yrs. 9 mos.). All of the other U.S. 1930s era destroyers had been decommissioned by 1947 and gone to the ship breakers before 1950, most by 1947. Twenty-three U.S. destroyers commissioned during the 1930s were lost to enemy action or foundered in storms.

== History ==
Winslow was named after Rear Admiral John Ancrum Winslow and Cameron McRae Winslow. She was laid down on 18 December 1933 at Camden, New Jersey, by the New York Shipbuilding Corporation; launched on 21 September 1936; sponsored by Miss Mary Blythe Winslow; and commissioned at the Philadelphia Navy Yard on 17 February 1937.

=== Pre-World War II ===
The warship completed outfitting in October 1937 and, on the 19th, embarked upon a shakedown cruise which took her to a number of European ports. Upon her return to the western hemisphere, she passed her final acceptance trials off the coast of Maine and was assigned to Battle Force, Squadron Nine (DesRon), Destroyer Division (DesDiv) Seventeen in the Pacific. On 23 November, after transiting the Panama Canal, Winslow and sister-ship USS Balch arrived at San Diego, California to comprise the all Porter-class Destroyer Division 17, along with flagship USS McDougal and relief flag USS Moffett. On 29 November 1937, Winslow began a week of sea-keeping and maneuvering practice with her division off San Diego. Other evolutions, lasting until 19 December, included antiaircraft drills, battle practice runs, and torpedo firing exercises. She spent the holidays in port. In early 1938, Balch became flag for DesRon Nine. Over the next three years, Winslow conducted operations in the eastern Pacific—generally between Hawaii and the west coast—from her home port at San Diego. The destroyer and her division participated in Fleet Problems XIX in April 1938 and XXI in April 1940.

By 1941, events in Europe—where World War II was already in its second year—necessitated the strengthening of American naval forces in the Atlantic. On 9 April, Winslow along with sister-ships, McDougal and Moffett, were ordered to Destroyers, United States Atlantic Fleet, Destroyer Flotilla Three, Squadron Nine, Destroyer Division Seventeen. After transiting the Panama Canal that month and visiting Guantanamo Bay in Cuba, Winslow reported for duty at Norfolk, Virginia. That summer, she conducted training operations with submarines off the New England coast. Later, she also participated in Neutrality patrols, particularly those directed at keeping watch over the Vichy French ships at Martinique and Guadeloupe in the French Antilles. Early in August, the three destroyers of Division Seventeen along with USS Madison and USS Sampson were ordered to screen the heavy cruisers Tuscaloosa and Augusta as the latter carried President Franklin D. Roosevelt to NS Argentia, Newfoundland, for a secret meeting with British Prime Minister Winston Churchill in the conference which resulted in the Atlantic Charter. Then, after escorting transports carrying reinforcements to Iceland, the destroyer arrived in Halifax, Nova Scotia, early in November and became a unit in the screen of America's first convoy to Southeast Asia. Convoy WS-12X, bound via the Cape of Good Hope for Singapore, departing Halifax on 10 November. Just before the convoy reached Cape Town, South Africa, where the destroyers were to part company with the convoy and head for home, word arrived that the Japanese had attacked Pearl Harbor.

=== 1942–1943 ===
After leaving the convoy at Cape Town, Winslow returned to the United States where she was assigned to the 4th Fleet, which had grown out of the South Atlantic neutrality patrols. The warship patrolled the area between Brazil and Africa, searching for German submarines and blockade runners until April 1944. On two occasions during that period, she returned briefly to the United States—in June 1942 and in October 1943—to undergo repairs at Charleston, South Carolina.

Robert Morgenthau, son of President Franklin Delano Roosevelt's Treasury Secretary, Henry Morgenthau, Jr. and future longest serving Manhattan, NY, District Attorney (1962–2010) was a naval officer commissioned at age 20 through the V-7 program prior to the attack on Pearl Harbor. Morganthau was attached to Winslow from early 1942 through mid-1943. Winslow was the first of three destroyers that Morgenthau was assigned, the second USS Lansdale was sunk by a German aerial torpedo in 1944. Morgenthau was one of 234 survivors (47 men went down with the ship) and bobbed and treaded water for nearly three hours in the frigid sea before being picked up by one of two destroyer escorts that plucked the survivors from the water. Shortly after the destroyer sank, Morgenthau gave his life vest to a screaming sailor in the water next to him, who had suffered a concussion when the ship was hit. Morgenthau's third and last destroyer, USS Harry F. Bauer, was attacked by thirteen kamikazes, and survived a torpedo and dive bomber attack (both failed to detonate) at the Battle of Okinawa in April 1945. Bauer was credited with destroying 17 kamikaze planes, and the ship and all the members of her crew were awarded the Presidential Unit Citation. Morganthau was acting executive officer on Winslow near the end of his duty on the ship, and permanent X.O. during his attachment to the Lansdale and Bauer. He was discharged as a lieutenant commander and received two awards of the Bronze Star Medal with Combat "V" device.

=== 1944–1945 ===
In April 1944, the warship began escorting newly constructed warships from Boston, Massachusetts via Norfolk, to the West Indies. After three such voyages, she began escorting convoys from New York to England and Ireland in August. She made five round-trip voyages across the Atlantic before putting into Charleston again in March 1945 for a four-month overhaul.

While in Charleston for alterations, Winslow lost her torpedo tubes, traded her light, single-purpose, 5-inch guns for five dual-purpose 5-inch guns. In addition, she received 16 40-millimeter and four 20-millimeter anti-aircraft guns in preparation for services in the Pacific.

=== Experimental Task Force 69 ===
In July 1945, Winslow and sister-ship McDougal were assigned to Admiral Willis Lee's Experimental Task Force 69 (ETF 69), which later became the Operational Development Force, Atlantic Fleet operating from Casco Bay, Maine. Willis "Ching" Lee was the Navy's foremost expert on radar-directed gunfire. Following his successful operation commanding American forces in the Second Naval Battle of Guadalcanal, Lee had been recalled from the Pacific Fleet by Fleet Admiral Ernest J. King to set up ETF-69 to develop improved tactics to defeat Japanese kamikaze attacks.

An August 1945 US Navy SECRET (since declassified) publication, "Anti-Suicide Action Summary, issued as CominCh P-0011, dealing with Japanese aerial suicide attacks against our surface forces in the Pacific, described the mission of the task force: "Chapter VI TASK FORCE 69 This force, under the command of Vice Admiral Willis A. Lee, has been established as an experimental task force under the direct operational control of the commander in chief, United States Fleet, to test methods, procedures, and all types of material in the combat of Jap suicide attacks. On 1 July operations were started.

COMPOSITION OF TASK FORCE 69

U.S.S. Wyoming (AG-17), one cruiser, two destroyers, two destroyer escorts, two LSM's (being fitted with radar equipment), three LcS(L)'s, XVF 200 (30 F6F's, four F4U's, two Zekes) XVJ 25 (drones, tow planes, simulated bogeys).

OPERATING AREA This force is operating in the Atlantic and the commander in chief, United States Atlantic Fleet, will exercise the administrative control and provide logistic support. At present this force is based at Casco Bay, Portland, Maine.

EXPERIMENTAL PROJECTS Commander Task Force 69 is concentrating the initial efforts of his force on matters which can be improved in the fleet now and especially on the following projects: Improvement of early detection and tracking of enemy aircraft by: More efficient operation of present radar and CIC installations. Improving these installations by modifications which can be accomplished quickly in the fleet. Increased effectiveness of antiaircraft fire by: Antiaircraft fire coordination. More rapid control. Increased rate of fire. Early target acquisition and identification. Testing new weapons and facilities to evaluate their effectiveness and working out initial operating procedures for their use.

LIST OF EXPERIMENTAL PROJECTS The following are a list of projects which have been formulated for test and evaluation by CTF 69: Evaluate use of Army SCR 270/MTI in LSM to determine whether this long range MTI-equipped search radar will assist in detecting and tracking enemy planes over land area near the landing beach. Evaluate Mark 32 radar IFF interrogator for fire control radar. Evaluate Field Change 50 for the SG-1 radar. Determine best procedure for operation cf Mark 37 director for following cases:

No surprise Ranges greater than 4,000 yards. Ranges less than 4,000 yards.

Surprise Ranges less than 4,000 yards.

Evaluate effectiveness of SCR-720 to provide adequate overhead coverage. Evaluate SC-lc MTI to determine effectiveness of tracking plane through clutter (over land, rough sea, or ships). Evaluate VJ equipment to determine its usefulness in fighter direction and target designation. Develop procedure for testing 5"/38 control systems under surprise conditions engaging a maneuvering target. Evaluate performance of director systems in respect to ability to pickup, track, engage, and produce hits with 5"/38 battery on a surprise, high-speed maneuvering target. Evaluate comparative performance of Mark 8 and Mark 1 computers with Mark 37 directors. Evaluate performance of Mark 57 and 37 director systems engaging a maneuvering target in full radar control from maximum effective range. Evaluate relative performance of Mark 37 and Mark 57 directors against a high speed maneuvering target, engaging at maximum effective range. Evaluate performance of Mark 15 Mod 1 20-mm. quad mount and Mk 22 Mod 0 (Max-son) quadruple 20-mm. mounts against aircraft targets. Evaluate effectiveness of high speed cranks in VF in designating targets for main battery director. Evaluate. SG zenith watch antenna to determine the extent of its effectiveness. Evaluate relative performance of experienced and inexperienced Mark 37 director and Mark 1 computer teams against a maneuvering target, as a check on effectiveness of training. Evaluate utility of colored bursts as indicators for shipboard or CAP target designation. Results of tests will be promulgated to the fleet as soon as they have been completed and analyzed. Special emphasis will be placed on the dissemination of information which appears to be of immediate value to the fleet in improving the detection and identification of enemy aircraft and the effectiveness of CAP and AA."

However, on 25 August, ten days after the Japan's surrender, Vice Admiral Lee suffered a fatal heart attack while being ferried in his admiral's barge to his flagship, the experimental gunnery training ship and former battleship USS Wyoming (AG-17), in the harbor (Casco Bay) at Portland, Maine. The program continued, with a successor assigned to command Task Force 69, following Admiral Willis "Ching" Lee's death.

On 17 September 1945, Winslow and sister-ship McDougal were respectively reclassified AG-127 and AG-126 and continued carrying out experimental naval gunnery operations. McDougal was decommissioned on 24 June 1946, at Kings Point, NY, while Winslow continued in service. On 11 July 1947, Wyoming put into Norfolk and was decommissioned on 1 August. Her crew was transferred to the ex-battleship Mississippi (AG-128), which assumed Wyoming's duties with the Operational Development Force.

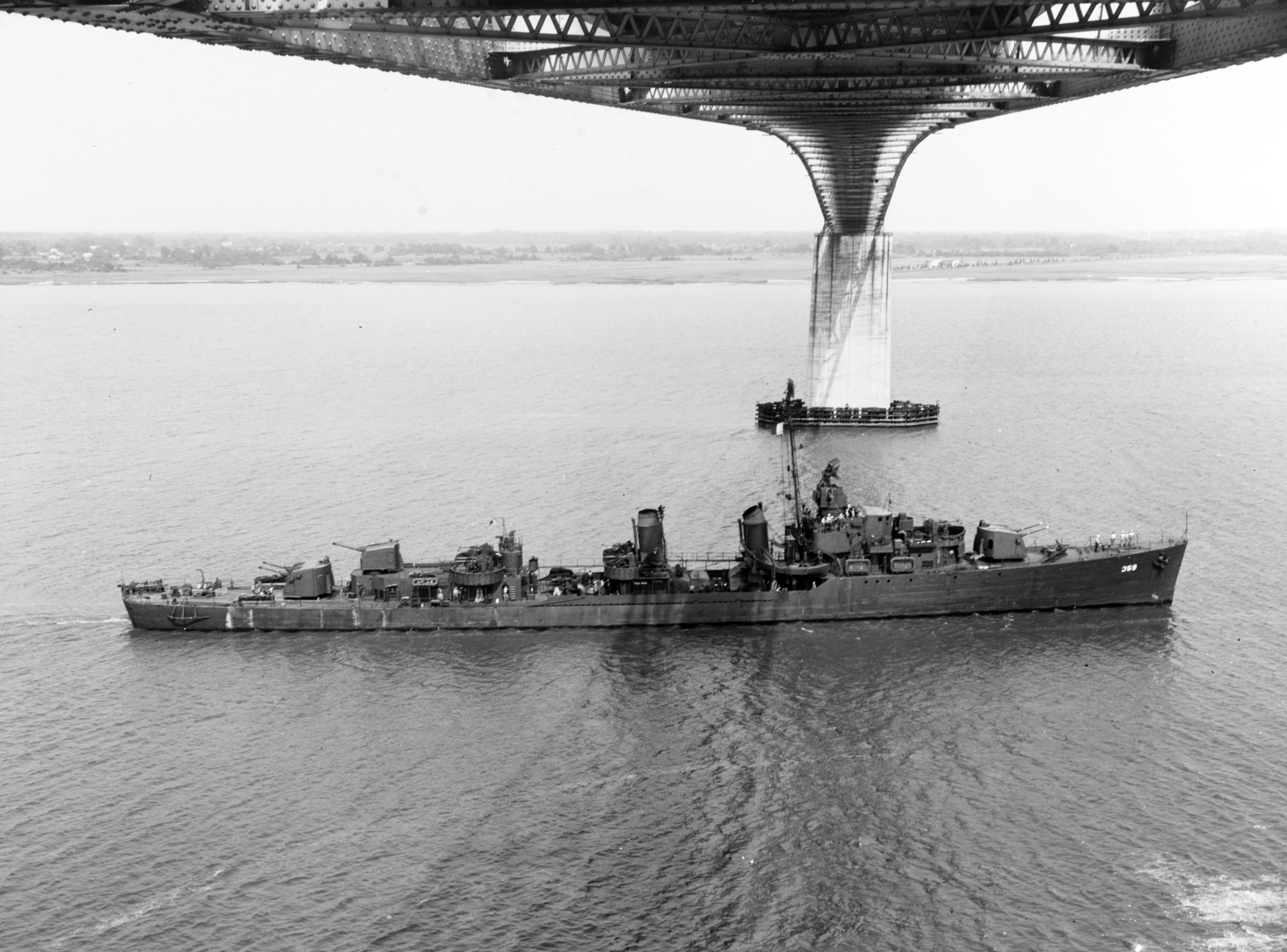
Winslow about July 1945, after completing overhaul at Charleston, SC

=== Post-World War II and fate ===
Winslow continued her experimental work with the Operational Development Force until she was decommissioned on 28 June 1950, the last U.S. destroyer commissioned during the 1930s to be decommissioned. Winslow remained in reserve, berthed with the Charleston Group, Atlantic Reserve Fleet, until declared unfit for further naval service on 5 December 1957. Her name was struck from the Navy list on that same day, and she was sold on 23 February 1959 for scrapping. Winslow had been the only U.S. destroyer that was not scrapped before 1950 and nearly survived that decade intact.
