= USS Davis (DD-395) =

Somers-class destroyer

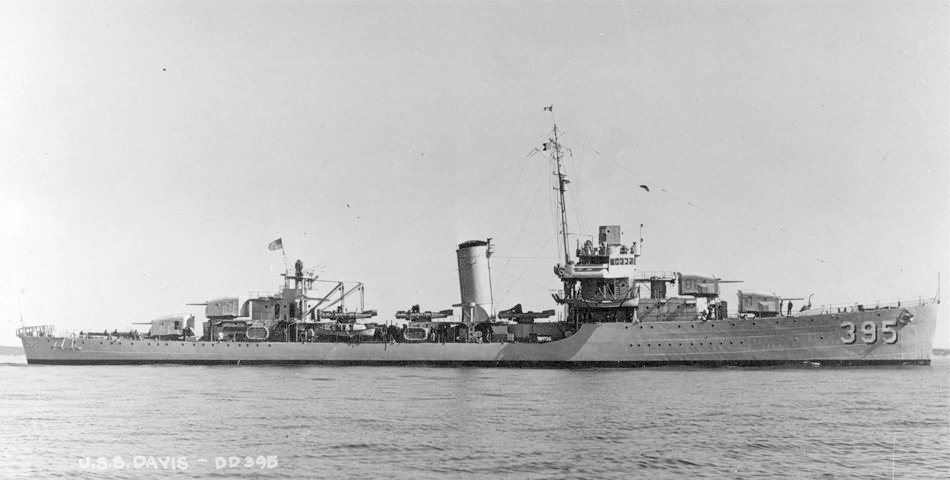
- USS Davis c. 1939

History

United States
- Name: USS Davis
- Namesake: Charles Henry Davis
- Builder: Bath Iron Works
- Laid down: 28 July 1936
- Launched: 30 July 1938
- Commissioned: 9 November 1938
- Decommissioned: 19 October 1945
- Stricken: 1 November 1945
- Fate: Sold 24 November 1947

General characteristics
- Class & type: Somers class destroyer
- Displacement: 1850 tons
- Length: 390 ft 11 in (119.15 m)
- Beam: 36 ft 11 in (11.25 m)
- Draught: 11 ft 4 in (3.45 m)
- Speed: 38 kt
- Complement: 235
- Armament: 8 x 5"/38 caliber gun, 9 x 21" tt.

The third USS Davis (DD-395) was a Somers-class destroyer in the United States Navy. She was named for Charles Henry Davis.

Davis was launched 30 July 1938 by Bath Iron Works, Bath, Maine; sponsored by Miss E. Davis, granddaughter of Rear Admiral Davis; and commissioned 9 November 1938.

== History ==
Davis was assigned to Neutrality Patrol in the North Atlantic after World War II broke out in Europe 1 September 1939. On 13 November she sailed from Boston, Massachusetts for Galveston, Texas, from which she patrolled in the Gulf of Mexico and conducted training exercises until clearing for patrol duty on the west coast between 11 March 1940 and 26 April 1941. She returned to the Caribbean for patrol and escort duty.

Continuing to serve in the Caribbean, after the United States entered the war, Davis also sailed on escort and patrol off Recife, Brazil, occasionally voyaging to the southern ports of the United States to pick up men and cargo, or to join convoys. On 19 July 1942 she rescued 10 men from the torpedoed British sailing ship Glacier. She sailed from Recife 19 December 1943 for a blockade runner Burgenland (7 January 1944) whom she transferred to the authorities at Recife upon arrival 9 January.

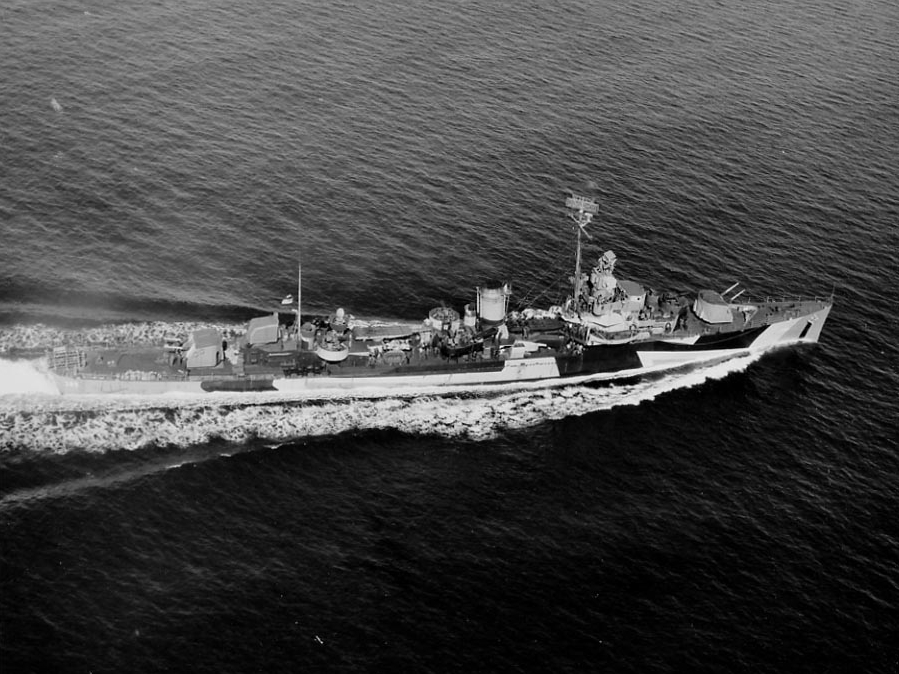
Davis underway after her modernization in 1944–1945.

Davis arrived in New York 15 April 1944 escorting Franklin (CV-13), and sailed for England 14 May as a convoy escort, arriving at Plymouth 25 May. On 5 June she was underway from Milford Haven, Wales, to join a convoy en route to Baie de la Seine for the invasion of Normandy. Davis arrived 7 June and five days later, while on patrol, repulsed a German E-boat (torpedo boat) attack. Returning to the Baie from Devonport, England, 21 June, with a support convoy, she hit a mine and was heavily damaged on the port quarter, and after emergency repairs departed two days later for the Isle of Portland, England. She continued to Charleston, South Carolina, arriving 11 August for permanent repairs.

Davis returned to convoy escort duty 26 December 1944 and until 21 June 1945 made four voyages between New York and English ports.

Arriving at Norfolk, Virginia 10 July, she remained there until decommissioned on 19 October 1945. She was sold on 24 November 1947.

== Honors ==
Davis received one battle star for World War II service.
