= USS Tuscaloosa (CA-37) =

New Orleans-class cruiser

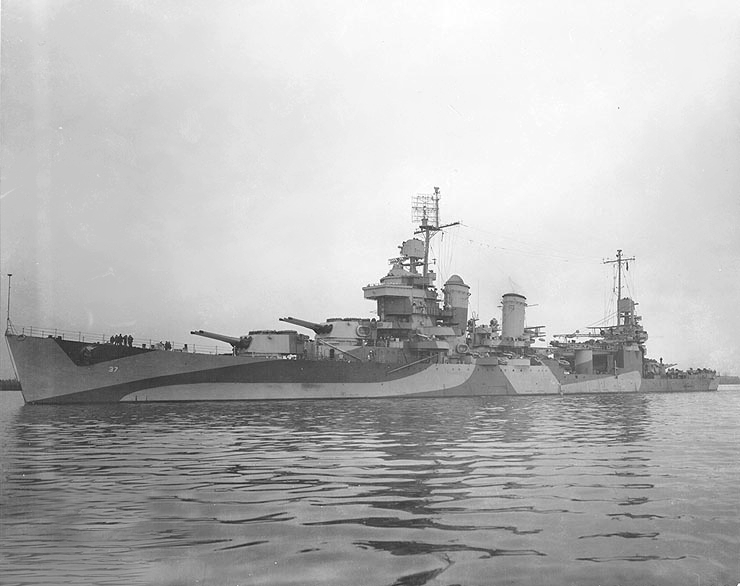
- USS Tuscaloosa (CA 37) off the Philadelphia Naval Shipyard on 10 November 1944

History

United States
- Name: Tuscaloosa
- Namesake: City of Tuscaloosa, Alabama
- Ordered: 13 February 1929
- Awarded: 3 March 1931
- Builder: New York Shipbuilding, Camden, New Jersey
- Cost: $10,450,000 (limit of price)
- Laid down: 3 September 1931
- Launched: 15 November 1933
- Sponsored by: Mrs. Thomas Lee McCann
- Commissioned: 17 August 1934
- Decommissioned: 13 February 1946
- Stricken: 1 March 1959
- Identification: Hull symbol: CA-37; Code letters: NAJF
- Honors and awards: 7 × battle stars
- Fate: Sold for scrap 25 June 1959

General characteristics (as built)
- Class & type: New Orleans-class cruiser
- Displacement: 9,975 long tons (10,135 t) (standard)
- Length: 588 ft (179 m) oa; 574 ft (175 m) pp
- Beam: 61 ft 9 in (18.82 m)
- Draft: 19 ft 5 in (5.92 m) (mean); 23 ft 6 in (7.16 m) (max)
- Installed power: 8 × Babcock & Wilcox boilers; 107,000 shp (80,000 kW)
- Propulsion: 4 × Parsons reduction steam turbines; 4 × Propellers
- Speed: 32.7 kn (37.6 mph; 60.6 km/h)
- Capacity: Fuel oil: 1,650 tons
- Complement: 103 officers 763 enlisted
- Armament: 9 × 8 in (200 mm)/55 caliber guns (3x3); 8 × 5 in (130 mm)/25 caliber anti-aircraft guns; 2 × 3-pounder 47 mm (1.9 in) saluting guns; 8 × caliber 0.50 in (13 mm) machine guns
- Armor: Belt: 3–5 in (76–127 mm); Deck: 1 1/4–2 1/4 in (32–57 mm); Barbettes: 5 in (130 mm); Turrets: 1 1/2–8 in (38–203 mm); Conning Tower: 5 in (130 mm)
- Aircraft carried: 4 × floatplanes
- Aviation facilities: 2 × Amidship catapults

General characteristics (1945)
- Armament: 9 × 8 in (200 mm)/55 caliber guns (3x3); 8 × 5 in (130 mm)/25 caliber anti-aircraft guns; 2 × 3-pounder 47 mm (1.9 in) saluting guns; 6 × quad 40 mm (1.6 in) Bofors anti-aircraft guns; 28 × single 20 mm (0.79 in) Oerlikon anti-aircraft cannons
- Aviation facilities: 1 × Amidship catapult

USS Tuscaloosa (CL/CA-37) was a New Orleans-class cruiser of the U.S. Navy. Commissioned in 1934, she spent most of her career in the Atlantic and Caribbean, participating in several European wartime operations. In early 1945, she transferred to the Pacific and assisted in shore bombardment of Iwo Jima and Okinawa. She earned 7 battle stars for her service in World War II. Never damaged in battle, the ship fared better compared to her six sister ships, three of which were sunk and the other three heavily damaged.

Tuscaloosa was decommissioned in early 1946 and scrapped in 1959.

== Construction and commissioning ==
The keel was laid down on 3 September 1931 at Camden, New Jersey, by the New York Shipbuilding Co., and the hull was launched on 15 November 1933, sponsored by Mrs. Jeanette McCann, the wife of Lieutenant Thomas L. McCann and the niece of William Bacon Oliver, the Representative of Alabama's 6th congressional district). She was commissioned on 17 August 1934, Captain John N. Ferguson in command.

The New Orleans-class cruisers were the last U.S. cruisers built to the specifications and standards of the Washington Naval Treaty of 1922. Such ships, with a limit of 10,000 tons standard displacement and 8-inch caliber main guns may be referred to as "treaty cruisers." Originally classified a light cruiser before she was laid down, because of her thin armor, she was reclassified a heavy cruiser, because of her 8-inch guns. The term "heavy cruiser" was not defined until the London Naval Treaty in 1930.

== Inter-war period ==
Tuscaloosa devoted the autumn to a shakedown cruise which took her to Rio de Janeiro, Buenos Aires, and Montevideo, before she returned to the New York Navy Yard shortly before Christmas. She then underwent post-shakedown repairs which kept her in the yard into March 1935.

The heavy cruiser soon shaped a course for the west coast. After a stop at Guantánamo Bay, Cuba, she transited the Panama Canal on 7–8 April and then steamed north to San Diego, where she joined Cruiser Division 6 (CruDiv 6) in time to participate in Fleet Problem XVI staged in May in the northern Pacific off the coast of Alaska and in waters surrounding the Hawaiian Islands. This operation was divided into five distinct phases which might be aspects of some real naval campaign of the future in which the United States would take the strategic offensive.

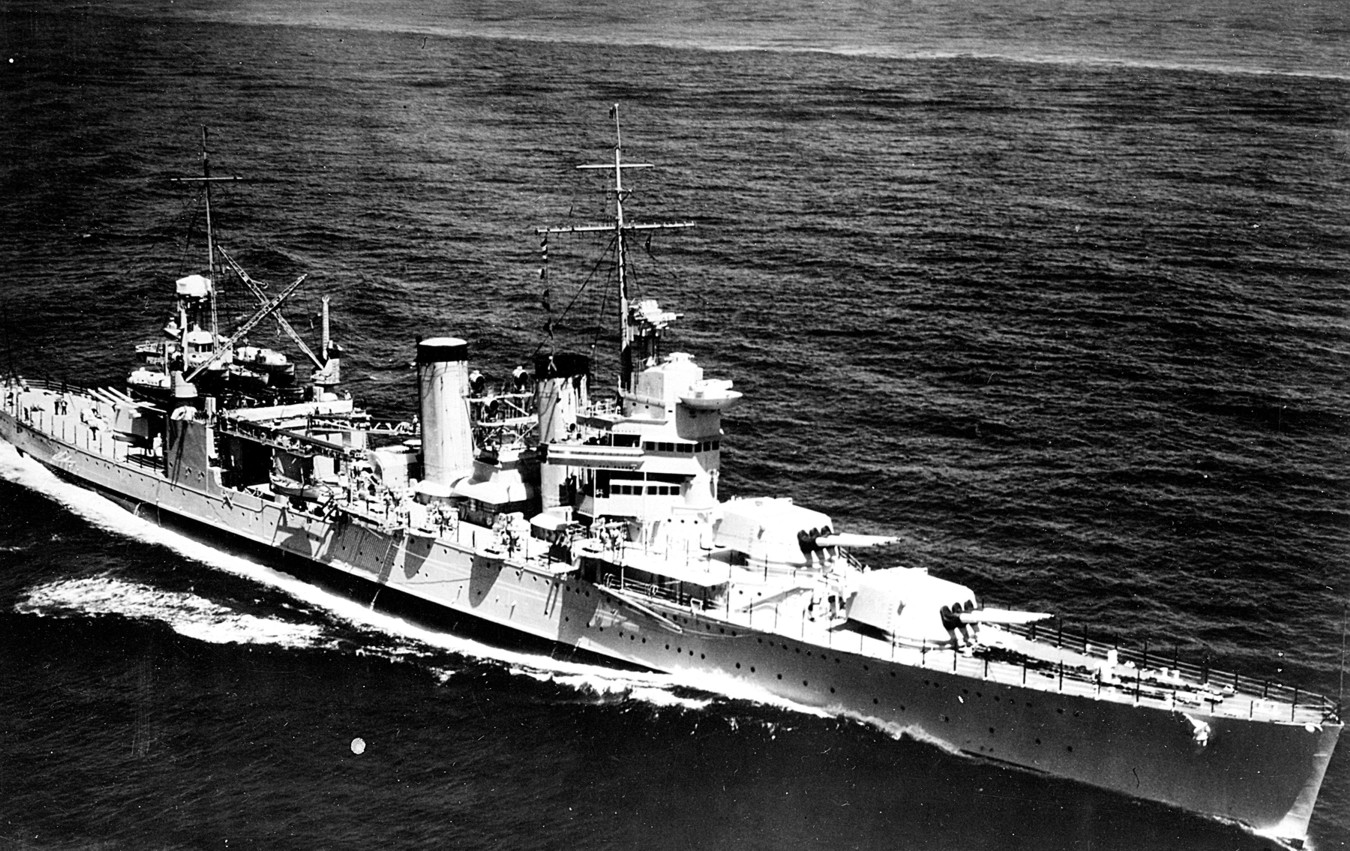
Tuscaloosa under way in 1935.

Tuscaloosa subsequently was based at San Pedro, California, whence she conducted routine exercises and local operations with CruDiv 6. In the spring of 1936, the heavy cruiser participated in Fleet Problem XVII, taking place off the west coast of the United States, Central America, and the Panama Canal Zone. The five phase exercise was devoted to preparing the fleet for antisubmarine operations, testing communications systems, and training of aircraft patrol squadrons for extended fleet operations.

In May 1937, the Fleet again exercised in Alaskan waters and in the vicinity of the Hawaiian Islands and Midway, practicing the tactics of seizing advanced base sites - a technique later to be polished to a high degree into close support and amphibious warfare doctrines. Tuscaloosa, as part of the "augmented" Scouting Force, "battled" the Battle Force that spring.

In April and May 1938, the heavy cruiser participated in Fleet Problem XIX, which was conducted in the vicinity of Hawaii.

Tuscaloosa departed San Diego on 3 January 1939 and proceeded, via the Panama Canal, to the Caribbean. She took part in Fleet Problem XX, in the Atlantic to the east of the Lesser Antilles, before undergoing a brief refit at the Norfolk Navy Yard. She then joined San Francisco and Quincy for a goodwill tour of South American ports. From 8 April to 10 May, the division—under the command of Rear Admiral Husband E. Kimmel—visited Caracas, Rio de Janeiro, Montevideo, and Buenos Aires before transiting the storm-tossed Strait of Magellan. The three cruisers drove their bows deep into heavy seas and battled gale-force winds as they made the difficult passage on 14–15 May. The division then sailed up the west coast of South America, visiting Valparaíso, Chile, and Callao, Peru, before transiting the Panama Canal and returning to Norfolk, where she arrived on 6 June.

Tuscaloosa remained off the east coast into the summer of 1939. In August, she carried President Franklin Delano Roosevelt to Campobello Island, New Brunswick. En route, off Portsmouth, New Hampshire, the Commander in Chief witnessed salvage operations in progress on the sunken Squalus which had stayed down after a test dive on 24 May. On 24 August, following visits to Campobello and several ports in Newfoundland, President Roosevelt disembarked at Sandy Hook on the coast of New Jersey.

== Before Pearl Harbor ==
=== September 1939 – November 1939 ===
The outbreak of World War II a week later (1 September 1939) found Tuscaloosa at NOB Norfolk. On the 5th, President Roosevelt established the Neutrality Patrol; and, the next day, the cruiser departed for her first patrol, which kept her at sea until she returned to her home port on the 11th. Three days later, the heavy cruiser departed Norfolk and spent the remainder of September and most of October engaged in gunnery training and conducting exercises out of Guantanamo Bay and San Juan, Puerto Rico. She departed the Caribbean on 27 October, bound for Hampton Roads, and arrived at Norfolk on 5 November and, but for gunnery exercises off the Virginia Capes from 13 to 15 November, remained in the Hampton Roads areas until mid-December.

Meanwhile, the Neutrality Patrol found itself keeping track of German merchantmen in waters of the western hemisphere. At the outbreak of hostilities, there had been some 85 German ships near the Americas. One of those, the North German (Norddeutsche) Lloyd (NDL) liner Columbus—the 13th largest steamship in the world—had been on a tourist cruise when war caught her in the West Indies. She put into Veracruz, Mexico, where she fueled and prepared to make a break for home.

=== December 1939 ===
The liner departed Veracruz on 14 December 1939 but soon thereafter was escorted by seven destroyers, including the Benham. Captain Willibald Dahne, the master of the Columbus, was careful to keep his ship within the 300 mi (480 km) neutrality zone until she was abreast of the Delaware capes. He then headed east. The Tuscaloosa, meanwhile, had been ordered out to participate. On 16 December, two days after Columbus departed Veracruz, Tuscaloosa stood out of Norfolk, bound for her patrol station. She soon relieved Cole and Ellis—two flushdeckers— at 0600 on 18 December. On 19 December, the liner spotted the British destroyer HMS Hyperion, who sent a warning shot and then a flash signal, "You are captured."

For Captain Dahne, there remained only one alternative. After having carefully planned for that eventuality, he scuttled his ship. All but two of his crew of 578 succeeded in going over the side and manning the lifeboats. The Hyperion clearly had no room for all of the Germans. The Tuscaloosa radioed the Hyperion, "Our orders, either you take all or none. We are warning, stay away from the boats. If you ram or sink one, we will have to commence firing at you."

From his motor launch, Captain Dahne kept the lifeboats together while the Tuscaloosa embarked the 576 men, boys and women. He then followed them to safety on board the cruiser which provided hospitality for the shipwrecked mariners who were glad to be on board an American cruiser as rescued seamen and not in a British warship as prisoners-of-war. The bulk of the survivors were put up in the cruiser's seaplane hangar that had been cleared out to facilitate its use as a large berthing area; and the women were berthed in sick bay.

Tuscaloosa took the survivors to New York—the only port equipped to handle such a large and sudden influx of aliens—and disembarked them at Ellis Island between 1610 and 1730 on 20 December for officials to process. Ultimately, most of Columbus officers and men returned, via the Pacific, to their native land. Meanwhile, Tuscaloosa departed New York on the 21st and arrived at Norfolk the following day.

=== January 1940 – November 1940 ===
The heavy cruiser remained at Norfolk into the New Year, 1940, and departed her home port on 11 January bound for the West Indies. On the voyage to the Caribbean, she was accompanied by her sister ship San Francisco; Battleship Division 5—less Wyoming and Manley, the prototype high-speed transport. Tuscaloosa and her consorts arrived at Culebra on the 16th, and two days later shifted to Guantánamo Bay. There, she participated in fleet exercises from the 18th to the 27th. Departing Guantánamo on the latter day, the Tuscaloosa returned to Norfolk on 29 January and entered the navy yard there for special alterations to fit her out for service as presidential flagship.

Tuscaloosa departed from the Norfolk Navy Yard on 2 February, and then she moored at NOB Norfolk. Two days later, she got under way for Cuba, arriving at Guantánamo on the 7th, only to steam out three days later for Pensacola, Florida, in company with Lang. The two ships exercised en route and arrived at Pensacola on the 14th.

On the next day, Tuscaloosa embarked President Roosevelt and his guests and departed in company with Jouett and Lang for a cruise to Panama and the west coast of Central America. The voyage gave the President an opportunity to discuss Pan American defense with leaders of Latin American nations. Steaming to the Pacific coast of Central America, Roosevelt inspected the Pacific defenses of the Panama Canal. In addition, he fished regularly at a variety of locations but, as he later recounted, caught "damned few fish." On the return passage through the canal, on 27 February, Roosevelt conferred with United States Navy, Army, and Air Corps officers to discuss the defense of the vital passage.

After disembarking the President at Pensacola, Tuscaloosa proceeded north to Norfolk and from thence to the New York Navy Yard for a three-month overhaul. During her sojourn at Brooklyn, Hitler's legions conquered France in June 1940 and won mastery of continental Europe. Soon thereafter, Tuscaloosa returned to the neutrality patrol and conducted monotonous but intensive patrols in the Caribbean and Bermuda areas through the summer and fall months of 1940.

=== December 1940 – April 1941 ===
On 3 December 1940 at Miami, President Roosevelt embarked in Tuscaloosa for the third time for a cruise to inspect the base sites obtained from Britain in the recently negotiated "destroyers for bases" deal. In that transaction, the United States had traded 50 old flush-deck destroyers for 99-year leases on bases in the western hemisphere. Ports of call included Kingston, Jamaica; Santa Lucia, Antigua; and the Bahamas. Roosevelt fished and entertained British colonial officials—including the Duke and Duchess of Windsor—on board the cruiser.

While the President cruised in Tuscaloosa, American officials in Washington wrestled with the problem of extending aid to Britain. Having barely weathered the disastrous campaign in France in the spring and the Battle of Britain in the summer, the United Kingdom desperately needed materiel. American production could meet Britain's need, but American neutrality law limiting the purchase of arms by belligerents to "cash-and-carry" transactions was about to become a major obstacle, for British coffers were almost empty. While pondering Britain's plight as he luxuriated in Tuscaloosa, the President hit upon the idea of the Lend-Lease program to aid the embattled British.

On 16 December, Roosevelt left the ship at Charleston, South Carolina, to head for Washington to implement his "lend-lease" idea—one more step in United States' progress towards full involvement in the war. Soon thereafter, Tuscaloosa sailed for Norfolk and, on 22 December, embarked Admiral William D. Leahy, the newly designated Ambassador to Vichy France, and his wife, for passage to Portugal. With the "stars and stripes" painted large on the roofs of Turrets II and III, and her largest colors flying, Tuscaloosa sailed for the European war zone, initially escorted by Upshur and Madison.

After disembarking the Ambassador to Vichy France at Lisbon and returning to Norfolk on 11 January 1941, the cruiser went to sea on maneuvers that kept her at sea until 2 March. She subsequently arrived at the newly opened American naval facility at Bermuda, on 8 April, the day after the base's commissioning. Her consorts included Ranger, Wichita, Kearny, and Livermore. Based at Bermuda, Tuscaloosa continued patrolling shipping lanes in the North Atlantic, enforcing the neutrality of the United States.

=== May 1941 – August 1941 ===
Elsewhere in the Atlantic, the war between the British and the Germans took an anxious turn late in May when the German battleship Bismarck and the cruiser Prinz Eugen broke out into the Atlantic. On 24 May, Bismarck had sunk the vaunted HMS Hood in the Denmark Strait and had temporarily eluded pursuit.

Bismarck's escape into the swirling mists of the Atlantic prompted orders which sent Tuscaloosa to sea immediately. Most of the crew on liberty at the time could not be rounded up in time, so the ship set out for the hunt with personnel "shanghaied" from Vincennes and Quincy and a group of reserve ensigns who happened to be on board for a reserve cruise. However, before the cruiser reached waters where she hoped to find Bismarck, British warships—directed under legally questionable circumstances by an American naval reserve ensign piloting a British PBY—succeeded in torpedoing Bismarck which had to be scuttled by her own crew after the damage caused a rudder jam and loss of her main guns.

Tuscaloosa soon returned to the tedium, the tenor of events soon changed for the heavy cruiser. On 8 August, she departed Bermuda for Newfoundland and soon embarked General Henry H. Arnold, head of the Army Air Corps; Rear Admiral Richmond K. Turner, Director of the War Plans Division of the Navy; and Capt. Forrest Sherman. She joined Augusta off New York City; and, together, the two ships, escorted by a screen of five destroyers, USS McDougal, USS Madison, USS Moffett, USS Sampson, and USS Winslow proceeded to NS Argentia, Newfoundland.

Augusta, bearing President Roosevelt, and her consorts soon arrived in the barren anchorage where the British battleship HMS Prince of Wales—with Prime Minister Winston Churchill embarked—awaited her. Once they met, Churchill and Roosevelt were silent for a moment until Churchill said, "At long last, Mr. President." Roosevelt replied, "Glad to have you aboard, Mr. Churchill." The ensuing discussions between the two heads of state hammered out the "Atlantic Charter".

=== September 1941 – October 1941 ===
Returning from Argentia upon the conclusion of the Anglo-American talks, Tuscaloosa conveyed Under Secretary of State Sumner Welles to Portland, Maine. Three weeks later, in September, the cruiser overtook the first American troop convoy to Iceland, as American marines relieved British troops guarding that strategic island.

Tuscaloosa soon received new orders which assigned her to a task group built around battleships Idaho, Mississippi, and New Mexico. Wichita and two divisions of destroyers joined Tuscaloosa in the screen of the men of-war. Under the two-starred flag of Rear Admiral Robert C. Giffen, the Denmark Strait patrol worked out of wind-swept, cold Hvalfjörður, Iceland—nicknamed by the American sailors and Marines as "Valley Forge".

The similarities between the Continental Army's historic winter campground and the Icelandic region were not just confined to a homonymous relation of their names. The bitter cold, wind, and snow and the wartime operations seemed similar—the latter in the form of daily patrols, unceasingly vigilant for any signs of the "enemy". Tuscaloosa and Wichita "stripped ship" for war, removing accumulated coats of paint, interior and exterior, floor tiling, and other inflammable and nonessential items before they set out for sea on 5 November. As the task force steamed toward Iceland, its warships were constantly alert to the possibility of an imminent sortie by the German battleship Tirpitz, the sister ship of the sunken Bismarck.

While Tirpitz refused to show herself, the American ships continued to conduct "short of war" operations against German shipping and naval forces which became increasingly warlike as time went on. The attempted torpedoing of the destroyer Greer, the damaging of the Kearny in October; the sinking of Reuben James by a German U-boat; and the torpedoing of the oiler Salinas all pointed to the fact that American ships were becoming involved in the war.

== The Bombing of Pearl Harbor and War for the United States ==
=== December 1941 – April 1942 ===
The Imperial Japanese Navy's attack at Pearl Harbor on 7 December 1941, plunged the United States into a real war at last, in both oceans, because both Nazi Germany and Fascist Italy declared war on the United States on 11 December.

In his speech to the Reichstag declaring war on the United States, Adolf Hitler described the presence of Tuscaloosa at the scuttling of the Columbus two years prior as a hostile act against the German nation, insisting that it had forced the liner "into the hands of British warships". As such, Hitler listed the Columbus operation among the casus belli for his declaration of war.

On 6 January 1942, Tuscaloosa steamed out of Hvalfjörður along with Wichita and two American destroyers—Grayson and Meredith—for a training mission through the Denmark Strait. After returning to port three days later, the heavy cruiser moved on to Boston for a navy yard overhaul from 8–20 February. She conducted refresher training out of Casco Bay and then underwent another brief refit at New York Harbor before joining Task Group 39.1 (TG 39.1), under the command of Rear Admiral John W. Wilcox, Jr., whose flag flew from the new battleship Washington.

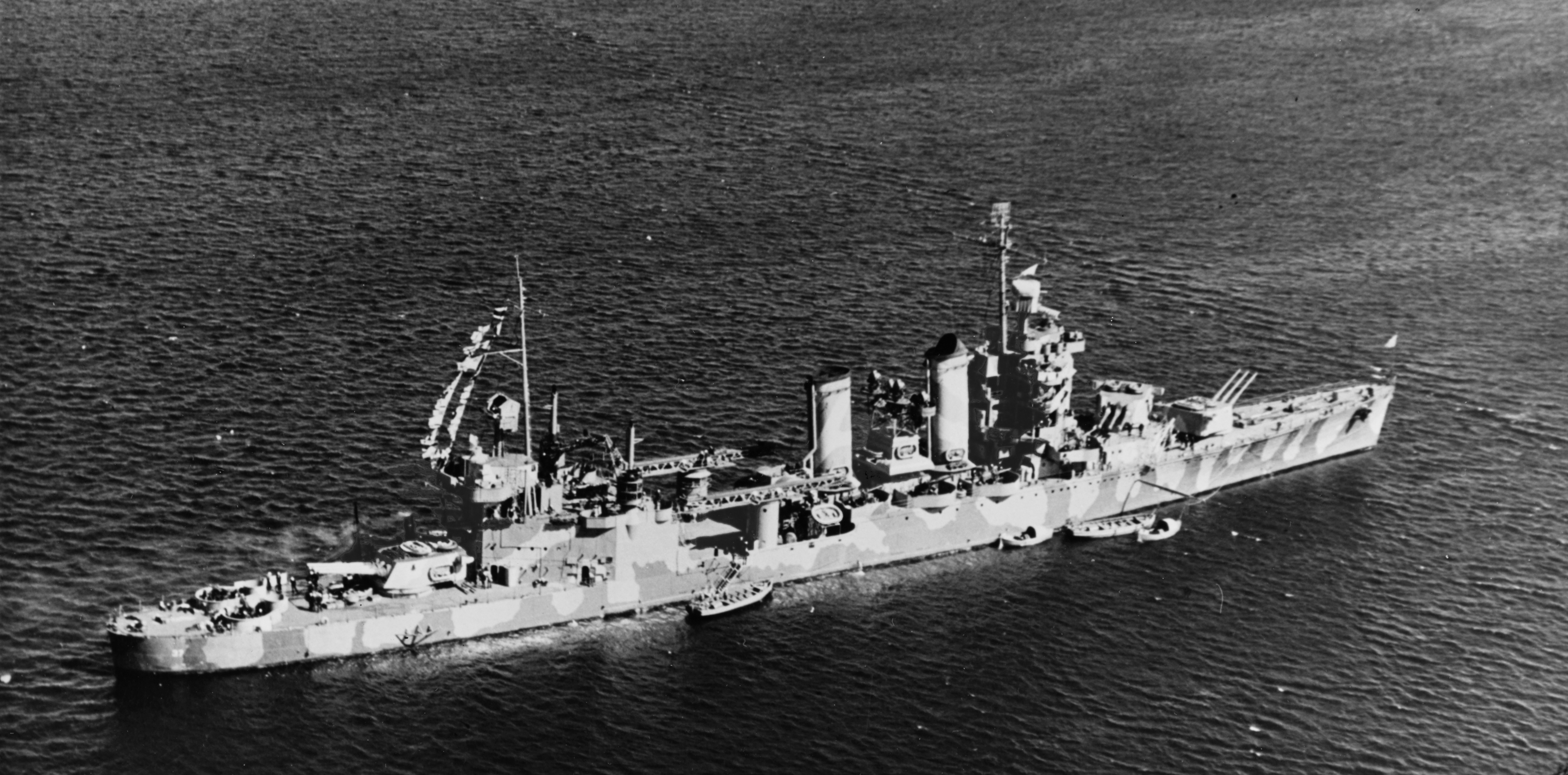
Tuscaloosa (foreground) anchored at Scapa Flow in April 1942.

TG 39.1 sortied from Casco Bay and then it struggled through the gale-whipped seas of the North Atlantic Ocean, bound for Scapa Flow, Scotland, in the Orkney Islands—the main base for the British Home Fleet. On 27 March, Rear Admiral Wilcox apparently suffered a coronary and then was washed overboard from Washington. (Some have speculated that the admiral might have jumped overboard to commit suicide, but there was no prior evidence at all that this might happen.) The heavy seas ruled out rescue attempts, and the task group's commanding officer soon disappeared in the stormy Atlantic. With Admiral Wilcox's death, Rear Admiral Giffen, whose two-starred flag flew from Wichita, assumed command of TG 39.1.

Tuscaloosa arrived at Scapa Flow on 4 April and she immediately took on board a British signals and liaison team. She was initially employed with the British Home Fleet on training duties and later took part in covering runs for convoys to northern Russia.

=== June 1942 – October 1942 ===
At that period, Anglo-American naval operations frequently were mounted in an attempt to lure Tirpitz out of her snowy Norwegian lair. One such attempt, Convoy PQ 17, resulted in disaster in June 1942. The following two months found Tuscaloosa still active in convoy covering and escorting assignments.

In mid-August, Tuscaloosa received orders to carry supplies—including aircraft torpedoes, army ammunition, and medical equipment—to Northern Russia, via the Arctic Ocean. Soon after she and two destroyers set out on the mission, a member of the cruiser's crew developed symptoms of spinal meningitis. The sick man was quickly put ashore at Seyðisfjörður, Iceland, and the group got underway again on 19 August, bound for Kola Inlet.

On the next day, Tuscaloosa and her screening warships—which by that time consisted of three destroyers (two American and one British)—were spotted by a snooping German reconnaissance plane. The task force changed course and, assisted by the worsening visibility in the northern latitudes, managed to shake the intruder. On the evening of 22 August, two more British destroyers joined Tuscaloosa's screen; and, the following day, a Russian escort guided them to Kola Inlet.

All hands turned-to and unloaded the valuable cargo. The cruiser then took on fuel; prepared to get underway; and, just before departure, embarked 243 passengers, most of whom were survivors of ships which had been sunk while serving in earlier convoys to Russia. Many of them had endured the special tribulation and agony of the PQ 17. With her human cargo thus on board, Tuscaloosa cleared Kola Inlet on 24 August and then she reached Seyðisfjörður on the 28th.

She remained there but briefly before steaming to the mouth of the River Clyde, where she disembarked her passengers. Detached from the Home Fleet shortly thereafter, Tuscaloosa headed back to Hvalfjord and then proceeded thence to the East Coast of the United States for a many-weeks-long overhaul.

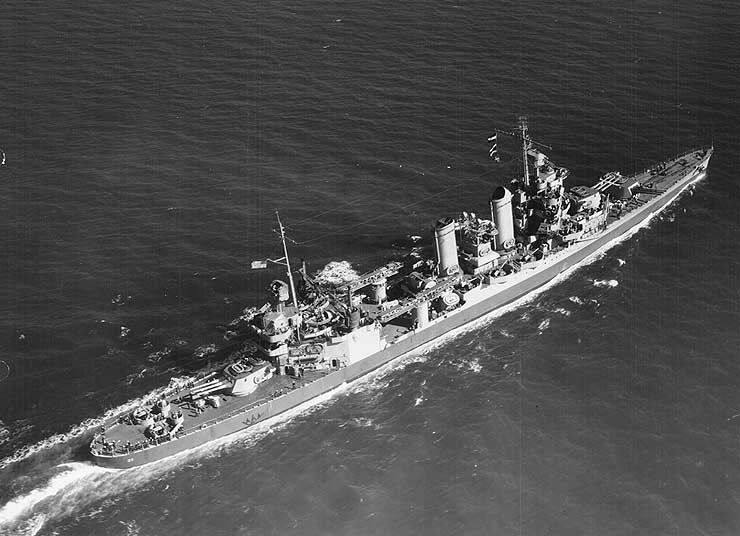
Tuscaloosa in October 1942

=== November 1942 – May 1943 ===
On 8 November 1942, Operation Torch—the code name of the Anglo-American effort to conquer Northwestern Africa from the Vichy French and Nazi Germany, and thence to expel the Axis powers from Africa—got under way.

Off Casablanca, French Morocco, the heavy cruisers Tuscaloosa and Wichita joined the new American battleship Massachusetts, the aircraft carrier Ranger and numerous light cruisers and destroyers as the "big guns" for the segment of Operation Torch in Morocco. (Other forces invaded Algeria via the Mediterranean Sea.) As American troops waded ashore, Tuscaloosa's powerful 8-inch, 55-calibre guns, aided by accurate spotting from the cruiser's scout planes, thundered loudly and sent high explosive shells flying shorewards into the French Army's defensive positions. In the harbor, French Navy warships scurried about as they prepared to sortie against the attackers.

The unfinished and immobile French Navy battleship Jean Bart, could still throw a powerful punch from her few completed 15 in (380 mm) naval guns, and she fired several relatively accurate salvoes, straddling the American warships several times with shell splashes. (The French did not have any fire control radars at that time, or for years later.) The French Army's shore batteries at Table d'Aukasha and El Hank also proved to be troublesome. However, the combined might of the American warships and naval air power silenced both the shore batteries and the big guns of Jean Bart, and demolished several French Air Force airfields.

After being narrowly missed by several torpedoes from Vichy French submarine Antiope and shells from Jean Bart's heavy artillery, Tuscaloosa retired from the battle scene to refuel at sea and to replenish her ammunition in deeper waters farther offshore. After these laborious operations, she remained offshore in support of the invasion and then she headed back to the East Coast of the United States for a major shipyard overhaul and replenishment at a large naval base.

Following this overhaul, Tuscaloosa rejoined the mission covering convoys bound for North Africa via the Atlantic and the Mediterranean, while American, British, Free French troops and airmen pushed the Axis Armies and the Vichy French forces out of Morocco and Algeria, and following that, cornering them in northern Tunisia around the city of Tunis. At that point, all of the Axis troops in Tunisia surrendered to the Allies in early May 1943, and thus the Axis powers were expelled from Africa.

Meanwhile, from March through May 1943, Tuscaloosa steamed in a task force on training exercises off the east coast of the United States.

Besides honing its fighting edge, this group formed a fast, mobile, and ready striking force, should German surface ships slip through the Allied blockade to terrorize Allied shipping in the Atlantic. In late May, she escorted RMS Queen Mary, which bore British Prime Minister Churchill to New York City. After rejoining the task force for a brief time, Tuscaloosa joined Augusta at the Boston Navy Yard for a 10-day work period.

=== Summer 1943 – October 1943 ===
After leaving Boston, she escorted RMS Queen Elizabeth to Halifax, Nova Scotia, before rendezvousing with Ranger and proceeding to Scapa Flow to resume operations with the British Home Fleet. Tuscaloosa conducted sorties into the North Sea, in company with British and American units, in attempts to once again entice German heavy units to sea. However, the hope of drawing the Germans into a decisive sea fight diminished each passing day as the enemy apparently sought to stay in his protected waters.

On 2 October 1943, Tuscaloosa formed part of the covering force for Ranger while the carrier launched air strikes against port installations and German shipping at the seaport town of Bodø, Norway, in Operation Leader.

These were the first-ever US Navy naval aviation air raids against any European targets, and they lasted from 2–6 October 1943. These raids reportedly devastated shore facilities and Wehrmacht forces in the Bodø area. German Luftwaffe shore-based warplanes attempted to attack the strike forces from Ranger, but they were shot down by covering American fighters.

Shortly afterward, the Germans did elect to come out to sea, conducting a foray against the important Allied weather station on Spitzbergen. Tirpitz and other heavy units subjected the installation and its garrison to a severe shelling before retiring, unscathed, to their Norwegian lair.

Tuscaloosa took part in the relief expedition to reestablish the station before the onset of winter. Assigned to Force One, the cruiser loaded two LCV(P) and cargo and departed Seyðisfjörður in company with four destroyers—three British and one American—on 17 October. Force Two, covering Force One, consisted of the battleship HMS Anson, the heavy cruiser HMS Norfolk, the carrier Ranger, and six destroyers.

On the morning of the 19th, Tuscaloosa's group arrived at devastated Barentsburg and immediately commenced unloading operations. While ice "growlers" and pinnacles hampered antisubmarine screening by the destroyers' sound gear, Tuscaloosa fielded a party of 160 men on shore to unload supplies and equipment to reestablish the weather station. By nightfall, the cargo had been safely unloaded, and the force left the area. After fueling at Seyðisfjörður, the cruiser proceeded to the Clyde to disembark the survivors of the original Spitzbergen garrison.

=== December 1943 – May 1944 ===
Tuscaloosa conducted one more sweep of the Norwegian coast in an attempt to draw German fleet units to sea, but the enemy chose not to give battle. Upon the cruiser's return to Iceland, she was detached from the Home Fleet and proceeded to New York where she began major overhaul on 3 December 1943.

Upon completion of the refit in February 1944, Tuscaloosa engaged in Fleet exercises and shore bombardment practice out of Casco Bay until April and then entered the Boston Navy Yard for installation of radio intelligence and electronic countermeasures gear. Later that month, she embarked Rear Admiral Morton L. Deyo, Commander, CruDiv 7, and task force commander, and set out for the Clyde to join the Allied Forces massing for the assault on the European continent.

During the interim period prior to D-Day, Tuscaloosa conducted further shore bombardment practice and engaged in further exercises. Her aviation unit exchanged its venerable Curtiss SOC Seagulls for British Supermarine Spitfires and checked them out for spotting purposes. However, they remained shore-based for the remainder of their time operating in support of the invasion.

=== June 1944 – July 1944 ===
On 3 June, Tuscaloosa steamed in company with the rest of Task Force 125 (TF 125) bound for the Normandy beaches. At 0550, 6 June, she opened fire with her 8-inch (203 mm) battery, and three minutes later her 5-inch (127 mm) guns engaged Fort Ile de Tatihou, Baie de la Seine. For the remainder of D-Day, coast defense batteries, artillery positions, troop concentrations, and motor transport all came under the fire of Tuscaloosa's guns, which were aided by her air spotters and by fire control parties attached to Army units on shore. VOS-7, a US Navy Spotter Squadron flying Supermarine Spitfire VBs and Seafire IIIs, was one of the units which provided targeting coordinates and fire control. Initial enemy return fire was inaccurate, but it improved enough by the middle of the day to force the cruiser to take evasive action.

On the afternoon of 9 June, Tuscaloosa returned to Plymouth to replenish her depleted ammunition. Back in the vicinity of the Îles Saint-Marcouf on the evening of the 11th, she remained on station in the fire-support area until 21 June, providing gunfire support on call from her shore fire control party operating with Army units. She then returned to Britain.

Five days later, on 26 June, the Army's VII Corps mounted a landward assault against Cherbourg, supported by ships of the covering force from the seaward side. For four hours, Tuscaloosa and her consorts dueled with the accurate German shore batteries. During the action, the enemy frequently straddled the British and American ships and forced them to take evasive action. Great clouds of smoke and dust, kicked up by the intense bombardment conducted from sea and land, initially hampered Allied fire. By noontime, however, visibility improved and greatly aided the accuracy of the bombardment.

In July, with the beachhead secured in Normandy and Allied forces pushing into occupied France, Tuscaloosa steamed from Belfast to the Mediterranean to join British, French, and American forces assembling for Operation Anvil-Dragoon, the invasion of southern France.

=== August 1944 – January 1945 ===
Following preliminary bombardment exercises off Oran, French North Africa, Tuscaloosa was based at Palermo, Italy, and got underway on 13 August. Two days later, Tuscaloosa commenced fire at 0635 and continued to pound targets ashore until the combined Allied forces stormed onto the beaches at H-Hour, 0800. Then, moving off the 100 fathoms (180 m) curve, Tuscaloosa leisurely cruised the shoreline, visually inspecting it for targets of opportunity. A troublesome pillbox at the St. Raphel breakwater provoked Tuscaloosa's attention, and the cruiser's 8 in (200 mm) shells soon destroyed it. Air spotters located a field battery, and Tuscaloosa's gunners promptly knocked it out of action with three direct hits.

For the next 11 days, the cruiser delivered fire support for the right flank of the Army's advance to the Italian frontier. She engaged German shore batteries and fought off air attacks. The raids—conducted by Junkers Ju 88s and Dornier Do 217s singly, or in small groups—usually occurred during the covering force's nightly retirement from the beachheads. Of the high altitude variety, these aerial assaults included the use of radar-controlled glider bombs. However, radar counter-measures and jamming devices, as well as effective evasive action and gunfire, thwarted these twilight and nocturnal attacks.

In September, when Allied forces had secured footholds in both western and southern France, Tuscaloosa returned to the United States for refitting at the Philadelphia Navy Yard. After a short exercise period in Chesapeake Bay, she steamed via the Panama Canal to the west coast and reported to the Commander in Chief, Pacific Fleet. After stopping briefly at San Diego, she proceeded on westward to Pearl Harbor, where she conducted various exercises before steaming to Ulithi to join Commander, 3rd Fleet in January 1945.

=== February 1945 – August 1945 ===
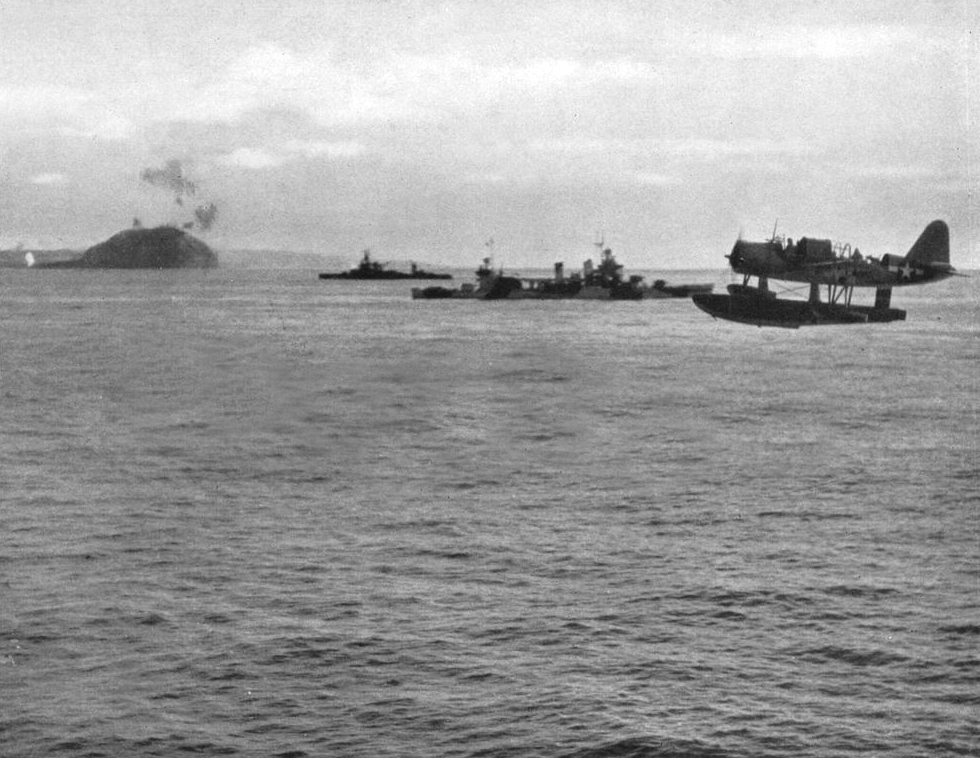
USS Tuscaloosa and USS Arkansas (background) bombarding Iwo Jima, 17 February 1945. A Vought OS2U Kingfisher is flying in the foreground.

Following her sortie from Ulithi, she joined the bombardment group off Iwo Jima at dawn on 16 February. Three days later, as waves of landing craft bore marines shoreward to invade the island, Tuscaloosa's guns pounded Japanese positions inland. Then, after the Americans had reached land, her batteries supported their advances with incessant fire and illumination. This continued from 19 February to 14 March, throughout all phases of the bitterly fought campaign to wrest the island from the Japanese.

After the Iwo Jima operation, she returned to Ulithi to join Task Force 54 (TF 54), spending four hectic days replenishing stores, ammunition, and fuel in preparation for the next operation: Okinawa, at the end of the chain of the Japanese home islands. On Palm Sunday, 25 March, Tuscaloosa's main and secondary batteries opened fire on shore targets pinpointed by aerial reconnaissance. Time considerations only allowed a six-day respite in the middle of the arduous campaign for replenishment purposes, Tuscaloosa stood on duty for the entire operation.

Tuscaloosa's faced significant challenge from the kamikazes which came at the invasion ships and their escorts from all quarters. The "Divine Wind" came down from the Japanese home islands, in the form of planes piloted by pilots said to be so loyal to their Emperor that they were said to have sacrificed themselves for their nation.

Tuscaloosa's gunners splashed two of the intruders. One, headed for the fantail of Texas, flew apart as the cruiser's shells splashed her in the old battleship's wake. The other headed for an escorting destroyer in the screen only to be splashed after hitting a curtain of fire from the cruiser's guns.

Only the mop-up of determined resistance ashore remained when Tuscaloosa departed from Okinawa on 28 June. Two days later, she arrived in Leyte Gulf, Philippine Islands; there reporting to Commander, 7th Fleet, for duty. Six weeks later, with Allied warships bombarding her shores with near impunity and Allied planes sweeping her skies clear of rapidly dwindling numbers of her defending aircraft, Japan surrendered.

On 27 August, Tuscaloosa, in company with other units of the 7th Fleet, departed Subic Bay in the Philippines, bound for Korean and Manchurian waters.

== Post-war ==
She touched at Qingdao, China, en route, and proceeded to cruise off the newly liberated ports of Dalian and Port Arthur, Manchuria; Yantai, Taku, Weihaiwei and Qingdao, China, before finally anchoring off Jinsen (now Incheon), Korea on 8 September to support the landings of Marines nearby.

After a stay of 22 days, Tuscaloosa put to sea once more on 30 September, bound for Taku, China, to support Marines landing there. She next sailed for Yantai on 6 October but, en route, received orders changing her destination to Jinsen to take on provisions.

As Chinese Nationalist and Communist forces jockeyed for position to control formerly Japanese-held territory, American forces stood by in the uneasy role of observers. Tuscaloosa arrived off Yantai, then held by the Communists, on 13 October. Remaining until 3 November, she lay at anchor off the port, keeping well informed on the situation ashore through daily conferences with officials of the Communist Eighth Route Army. During this period, collaborationist troops who had been loyal to the Japanese during the war, clashed with Communist forces near Yantai.

On 3 November, she put to sea, bound for Qingdao, where the cruiser spent one evening before proceeding down the Chinese coast to call at Shanghai. There, she took on board 214 army and 118 navy passengers for "Magic Carpet" transportation home for demobilization.

She arrived in Hawaii on 26 November, where additional passenger facilities were installed, and took on board 206 more men before departing Hawaiian waters on the 28th and arriving at San Francisco on 4 December. After voyage repairs, the ship sailed for the South Pacific on 14 December, via the Solomon Islands, and proceeded to Nouméa, New Caledonia.

Tuscaloosa embarked troops at Guadalcanal, moved to the Russell Islands where she took on more passengers, and arrived at Nouméa on New Year's Day 1946. By that afternoon, the ship got underway for the west coast with more than 500 passengers.

She arrived at Pearl Harbor nine days into the new year, fueled, and picked up additional demobilized servicemen to transport home. She sailed for San Francisco on 10 January and arrived five days later. On 29 January, the men delivered, Tuscaloosa stood out of San Francisco bound for the east coast on her last cruise as an active member of the fleet.

Placed out of commission at Philadelphia on 13 February 1946, Tuscaloosa remained in reserve there until she was struck from the Naval Vessel Register on 1 March 1959. Her hulk was sold on 25 June to the Boston Metals Company of Baltimore, Maryland, for scrapping.

The ship's former mast is the centerpiece of the Tuscaloosa Veterans Memorial Park, which also features one of her five-inch guns.

== Awards ==
- American Defense Service Medal with "FLEET" clasp and "A" device
- European-African-Middle Eastern Campaign Medal with five battle stars
- Asiatic–Pacific Campaign Medal with two battle stars
- World War II Victory Medal
- Navy Occupation Medal with "ASIA" clasp
- China Service Medal
