= Somers-class destroyer =

Destroyer class of the US Navy

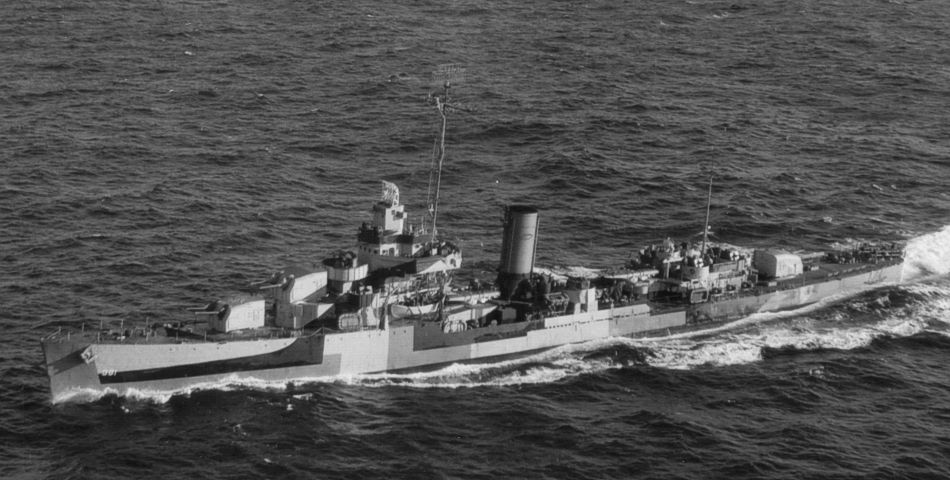
- USS Somers in 1944

Class overview
- Name: Somers class
- Builders: Federal Shipbuilding, NJ (2); Bath Iron Works, ME (3)
- Operators: United States Navy
- Preceded by: Bagley class
- Succeeded by: Benham class
- Built: 1935–1939
- In commission: 1937–1945
- Completed: 5
- Lost: 1
- Retired: 4

General characteristics
- Type: Destroyer
- Displacement: 1,840 tons standard, 2,767 tons full load
- Length: 381 ft (116 m)
- Beam: 36 ft 2 in (11.02 m)
- Draft: 10 ft 4 in (3.15 m)
- Installed power: 4 Babcock & Wilcox boilers, 2 General Electric geared steam turbines, 52,000 shaft horsepower (39,000 kW) (design), 53,271 shaft horsepower (39,724 kW) (trials)
- Propulsion: 2 shafts
- Speed: 36 kn (67 km/h; 41 mph) design, 38.6 kn (71.5 km/h; 44.4 mph) trials
- Range: 7,020 nmi (13,000 km; 8,080 mi) at 12 kn (22 km/h; 14 mph)
- Complement: 10 officers, 225 enlisted (peacetime); 16 officers, 278 enlisted (wartime)
- Sensors & processing systems: Mk35 GFCS; 1 × SC radar
- Armament: As built: 4 × twin 5 in (127 mm)/38 caliber guns; 2 × quad 1.1 in (28 mm)/75 caliber guns; 2 × .50 caliber machine guns (12.7 mm); 3 × quad 21 inch (533 mm) torpedo tubes, 12 torpedoes; 2 × Depth charge stern racks
- Notes: Armament varied greatly from ship to ship during World War II.

The Somers-class destroyer was a class of five 1850-ton United States Navy destroyers based on the Porter class. They were answers to the large destroyers that the Japanese navy was building at the time, and were initially intended to be flotilla leaders. They were laid down from 1935–1936 and commissioned from 1937–1939. They were built to round-out the 13 destroyers of 1,850-ton standard displacement allowed by the tonnage limits of the London Naval Treaty and were originally intended to be repeat Porter ships. However, new high-pressure, high-temperature boilers became available, allowing the use of a single stack. This, combined with weight savings (including elimination of reload torpedoes), allowed an increase from two quadruple centerline torpedo tube mounts to three. However, the Somers-class ships were still overweight and top-heavy. This was the first US destroyer class to use 600 psi (4,100 kPa) steam superheated to 850 °F (454 °C), which became standard for US warships built in the late 1930s and World War II.

Like the Porter class, they were originally built with eight 5-inch (127 mm)/38 caliber guns in four single-purpose (surface action only) twin mounts. Antiaircraft (AA) protection was initially provided by two quadruple 1.1-inch (28 mm) machine cannon mounts and two .50-caliber machine guns. The 1.1-inch mounts were intended to compensate for the 5-inch guns' lack of AA capability; in the 1930s, this was thought to be sufficient. As with the Porter class, the Somers' main armament was reduced to six guns (and replaced with dual-purpose mounts totaling five guns in Davis and Jouett) during World War II, with the AA armament replaced by 40 mm Bofors and 20 mm Oerlikon guns and the torpedo armament reduced to eight tubes. In two ships (Davis and Jouett), the torpedo armament was eliminated to maximize the number of 40 mm guns.

All of the class served in World War II, initially on neutrality patrols in the Atlantic and Caribbean. In early 1942 Warrington and Sampson were transferred to the Southeast Pacific Area, where they primarily escorted convoys between the Panama Canal and the Society Islands. In mid-1943, these two were transferred to the Southwest Pacific Area and operated near New Guinea and in the Solomon Islands; the others operated off Brazil and in the Caribbean and South Atlantic. In May 1944, all were transferred to the North Atlantic to support the invasion of Normandy, in which Somers, Davis, and Jouett were directly involved. Somers and Jouett supported the invasion of southern France in August. Warrington foundered in a hurricane in the Bahamas in September 1944. The others escorted convoys for the remainder of the war and were scrapped by 1947.

== Design ==
The five Somers-class ships were built to round out the eight Porter-class 1850-ton destroyers to the London Naval Treaty tonnage limit of 13 such ships, and were originally intended to be repeat Porters. However, controversial (for the time) high-pressure, high-temperature, air-encased boilers derived from the ones installed in the modernized battleship New Mexico became available, and the class was built to a modified design by Gibbs & Cox. The new boilers allowed the use of a single stack. This, combined with weight savings (including elimination of reload torpedoes), allowed an increase from two quadruple centerline torpedo tube mounts to three (versus the Porters). However, the Somers class were still overweight and top-heavy. The resulting broadside of twelve torpedo tubes was the heaviest ever on a US destroyer; other classes (Gridley, Bagley, and Benham) with sixteen torpedo tubes had an eight-tube broadside. Gun armament remained the same as the Porters, with eight 5-inch/38 caliber single-purpose (antisurface only) guns in four twin mounts. Two quadruple 1.1-inch machine cannon mounts were added to compensate for the lack of main battery AA capability.

=== Engineering ===
The Somers-class propulsion plant was the most advanced yet installed in a USN destroyer. Compared with the Porter ships, four Babcock & Wilcox boilers of a new air-encased design raised the design horsepower from 50,000 shaft horsepower (37,000 kW) to 52,000 shaft horsepower (39,000 kW). Steam conditions rose to 600 psi (4,100 kPa), superheated to 850 °F (454 °C) for the first time; this became standard for US warships built in the late 1930s and World War II. Boiler economizers were included for improved fuel efficiency. The main steam turbines were impulse-type (also called Curtis turbines) and included cruising turbines and double-reduction gearing. This increased the ships' range from 6,380 nautical miles (11,820 km; 7,340 mi) to 7,020 nautical miles (13,000 km; 8,080 mi).

=== Armament ===
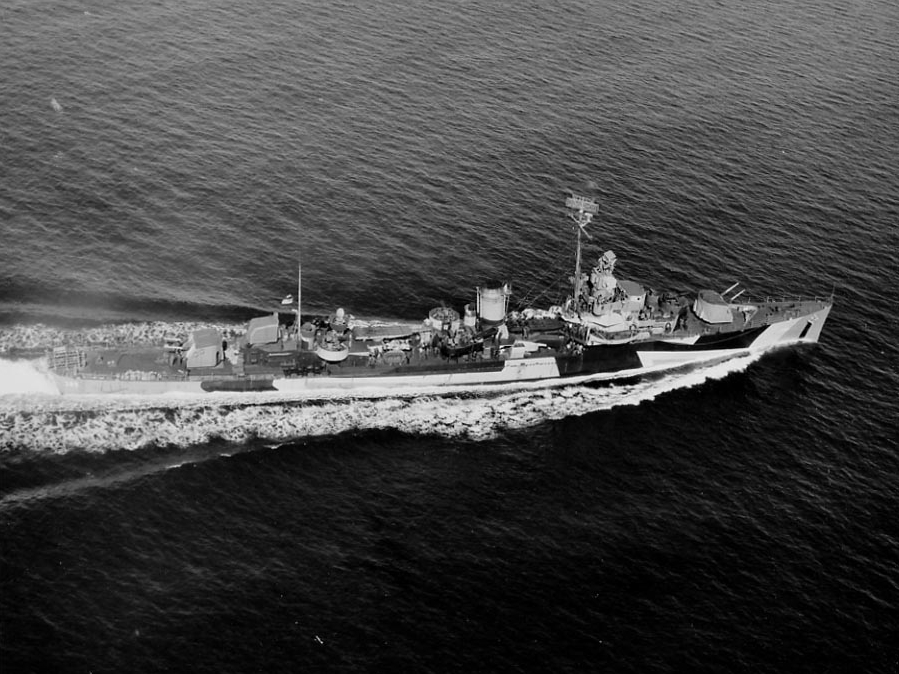
USS Davis in 1945, with five dual-purpose 5-inch guns.

Like the Porters, the Somers class were originally built with eight Mark 12 5-inch/38 caliber guns in four Mark 22 single purpose (anti-surface only) twin mounts. Torpedo armament was increased to twelve 21-inch (533 mm) tubes in three quad mountings on the centerline, but with no reloads. The Mark 15 torpedo was equipped. Anti-aircraft (AA) protection was initially provided by two quadruple 1.1-inch machine cannon mounts and two .50-caliber machine guns. The 1.1-inch mounts were intended to compensate for the 5 inch guns' lack of AA capability; in the 1930s two quad mounts were thought to be sufficient. During World War II, as with the Porters, the Somers-class main armament was reduced to six guns, with the light AA armament replaced by up to six 40 mm Bofors in twin mounts and several 20 mm Oerlikon guns by also landing a torpedo tube mount. On most ships four K-gun depth charge throwers were added to augment the as-built pair of depth charge racks. In Davis and Jouett the main armament was replaced by five dual-purpose guns in two twin and one single mount. Later in these two, the torpedo armament was eliminated along with two K-guns and one depth charge rack to maximize the number of 40 mm guns at 14, placed in two quad mounts and three twin mounts.

== Service ==
In 1941, all of the class were based in the Atlantic or Caribbean conducting Neutrality Patrols, during which Somers and the cruiser Omaha captured a German blockade runner, earning the last prize money ever awarded by the US Navy. In early 1942 Warrington and Sampson moved to the Southeast Pacific Area, escorting convoys from the Panama Canal to the Society Islands, along with patrols to ports in South America. These two transferred to the Southwest Pacific Area in mid-1943, with operations including the start of the Bougainville Campaign, a raid on New Ireland, and actions near New Guinea. Somers, Davis, and Jouett spent the first years of the war patrolling the Caribbean and South Atlantic, intercepting several German blockade runners and at least one U-boat (U-128) near Brazil. In January 1943 Somers relocated to Bathurst, Gambia to support the Roosevelt-Churchill-De Gaulle Casablanca Conference, later escorting the Free French warships Richelieu and Montcalm from Dakar, Senegal to the United States.

In May 1944 all of the class were transferred to the North Atlantic as part of the buildup for the invasion of Normandy, which Somers, Davis, and Jouett directly supported. Although Davis struck a mine and returned to the US for repairs, Somers and Jouett also supported the invasion of southern France in August, in which Somers sank two German vessels and engaged shore batteries. Warrington foundered in a hurricane near the Bahamas in September. The remainder of the class spent the rest of the war escorting convoys in the Atlantic and Mediterranean. Following the war, all were scrapped by 1947.

== Ships in class ==
Ships of the Somers destroyer class
Name	Hull no.	Builder	Laid down	Launched	Commissioned	Decommissioned	Fate
Somers	DD-381	Federal Shipbuilding, Kearny, New Jersey	27 June 1935	13 March 1937	1 December 1937	28 October 1945	Sold for scrap 1947
Warrington	DD-383	Federal Shipbuilding, Kearny, New Jersey	10 October 1935	15 May 1937	9 February 1938	—N/a	Lost in a hurricane north of the Bahamas, 13 September 1944
Sampson	DD-394	Bath Iron Works	8 April 1936	16 April 1938	19 August 1938	1 November 1945	Sold for scrap 1946
Davis	DD-395	Bath Iron Works	28 July 1936	30 July 1938	9 November 1938	19 October 1945	Sold for scrap 1947
Jouett	DD-396	Bath Iron Works	26 March 1936	24 September 1938	25 January 1939	1 November 1945	Sold for scrap 1946

== See also ==
- Porter-class destroyer
