= Porter-class destroyer =

Destroyer class of the US Navy

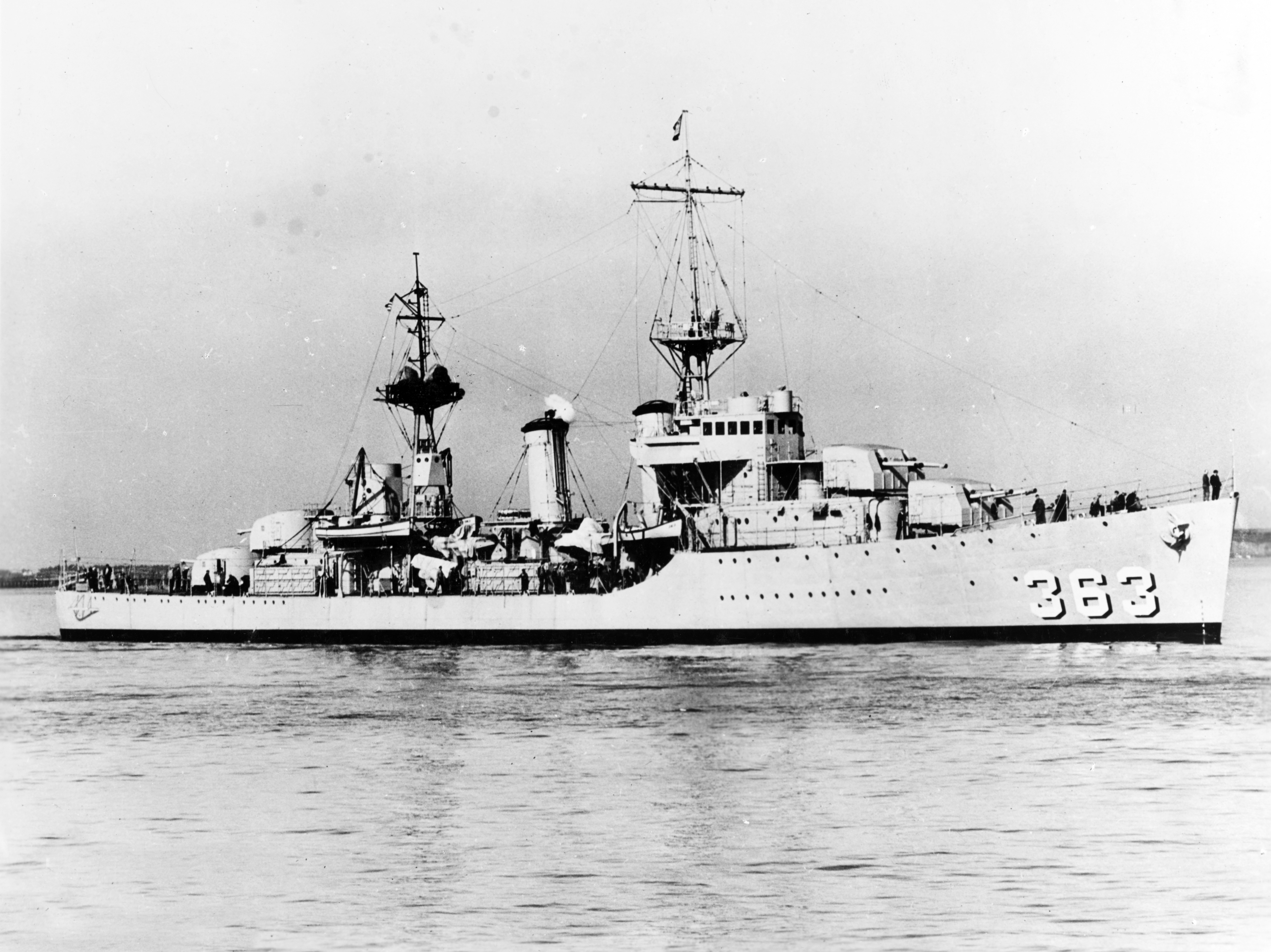
- USS Balch — the eighth and final Porter-class destroyer — on 23 September 1936

Class overview
- Name: Porter class
- Builders: New York Shipbuilding, NJ (4); Bethlehem Fore River, MA (4)
- Operators: United States Navy
- Preceded by: Farragut class
- Succeeded by: Mahan class
- Built: 1933–1937
- In commission: 1936–1950
- Completed: 8
- Lost: 1
- Retired: 7

General characteristics
- Type: Destroyer
- Displacement: 1,850 tons standard, 2,663 tons full load
- Length: 381 ft (116 m)
- Beam: 36 ft 2 in (11.02 m)
- Draft: 10 ft 5 in (3.18 m)
- Installed power: 4 Babcock & Wilcox boilers, 2 geared steam turbines, 50,000 shaft horsepower (37,000 kW)
- Propulsion: 2 shafts
- Speed: 37 kn (69 km/h; 43 mph)
- Range: 6,380 nautical miles (11,820 km; 7,340 mi) at 12 kn (22 km/h; 14 mph)
- Complement: 13 officers, 193 enlisted (peacetime); 290 (wartime)
- Sensors & processing systems: as built: 2 × Mk35 GFCS; typical: single Mk35 or Mk37 GFCS.; 1 × SC radar
- Armament: As Built: 8 × 5-inch/38 caliber guns (127 mm) (4 × 2); 8 × 1.1-inch/75 caliber guns (28 mm) (2 × 4); 2 × .50 caliber machine guns (12.7 mm); 8 × 21-inch (533 mm) torpedo tubes (2 × 4), 16 torpedoes; 2 × Depth charge stern racks; c. 1942: 8 × 5-inch/38 caliber guns (4 × 2); 2 × Bofors 40 mm guns (1 × 2); 6 × 20 mm Oerlikon cannons; 8 × 21 inch torpedo tubes (2 × 4), 16 torpedoes; 2 × Depth charge stern racks
- Notes: Armament varied greatly from ship to ship during World War II.

The Porter-class destroyers were a class of eight 1,850-ton large destroyers in the United States Navy. Like the preceding Farragut-class, their construction was authorized by Congress on 26 April 1916, but funding was delayed considerably. They were designed based on a 1,850-ton standard displacement limit imposed by the London Naval Treaty; the treaty's tonnage limit allowed 13 ships of this size, and the similar Somers class was built later to meet the limit. The first four Porters were laid down in 1933 by New York Shipbuilding in Camden, New Jersey, and the next four in 1934 at Bethlehem Steel Corporation in Quincy, Massachusetts. All were commissioned in 1936 except Winslow, which was commissioned in 1937. They were built in response to the large Fubuki-class destroyers that the Imperial Japanese Navy was building at the time and were initially designated as flotilla leaders. They served extensively in World War II, in the Pacific War, the Atlantic, and in the Americas. Porter was the class's only loss, in the Battle of the Santa Cruz Islands on 26 October 1942.

== Design ==
The larger destroyer leader type had been under active consideration since 1921. Indeed, the General Board recommended the construction of five of the type in that year. One factor in favor of leaders was the Navy's total lack of modern light cruisers, only partly alleviated by the ten Omaha-class ships built in the 1920s. Naval historian Norman Friedman believed that the great number of Wickes and Clemson-class destroyers hindered the U.S. Congress from purchasing new leaders. The General Board was very interested in equipping such a type with the new higher pressure and higher temperature steam propulsion equipment also proposed for the Farragut-class destroyers; this would extend the ships' range. The London Naval Treaty and large French destroyers (France did not sign the treaty and built ships well in excess of its limits) seem to have become the tipping points, with the 1930 recommendations beginning the cycle to actually build ships. The Geneva proposals for destroyers also seem to have influence the design, as the Destroyer Leader proposals limited themselves to 1,850 tons per the proposals; these tonnage limits were eventually included in the London treaty.

=== Engineering ===
The Porters had the same propulsion technology as the immediately preceding Farraguts, with 400 psi (2,800 kPa) steam superheated to 645 °F (341 °C). The plant was somewhat larger than in the Farraguts, with designed horsepower increased from 42,800 shaft horsepower (31,900 kW) to 50,000 shaft horsepower (37,000 kW), resulting in a speed of 37 kn (69 km/h; 43 mph). Along with the improved fuel efficiency resulting from superheated steam, the four boilers included economizers to further extend the ships' range by preheating incoming feedwater. The main steam turbines were manufactured by New York Shipbuilding in the case of the ships built by that yard. However, as in the Farraguts, the main turbines had single-reduction gearing and no cruising turbines, limiting their efficiency.

=== Armament ===
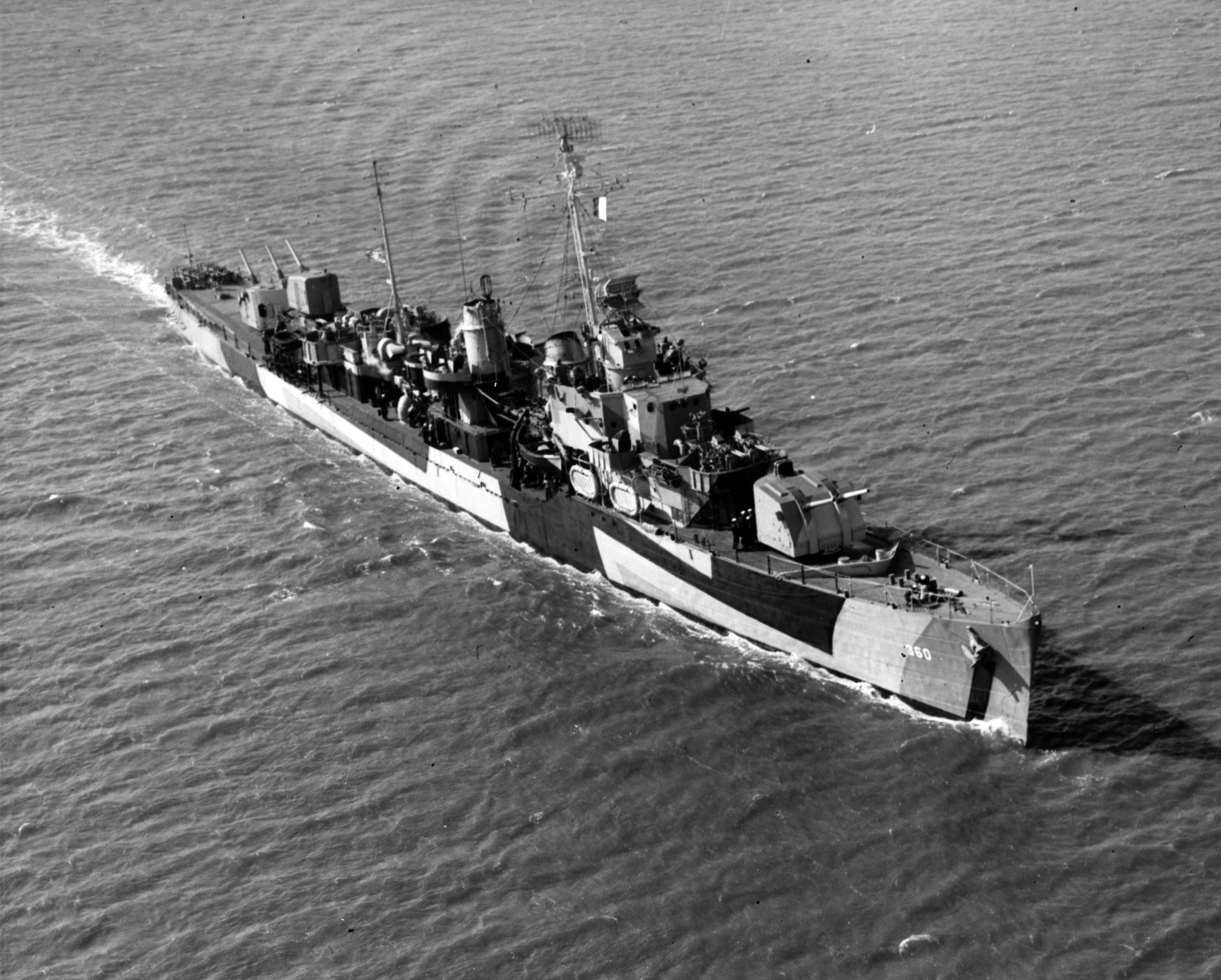
USS Phelps in November 1944, with five dual-purpose 5-inch (127 mm) guns

There were extensive discussions about the armament, the 5-inch (127 mm)/25-caliber anti-aircraft (AA) gun being favored as being easy to work and train in a fast-moving and lively type of ship. The other candidate was the 5-inch/51-caliber surface type, being very powerful but all but useless against aircraft. It was a discussion made more interesting as the 5-inch/38-caliber dual-purpose gun became available in the early 1930s and the Ordnance Department favored it rather strongly. The 5-inch/38-caliber gun was simply a 5-inch/25-caliber gun with the same projectiles and a longer barrel, but significantly increased range against both air and surface targets. The class was originally built with eight Mk 12 guns in four Mark 22 single-purpose (surface action only) twin enclosed mounts; the single-purpose mounts were adopted to save weight. Anti-aircraft protection was provided by two quadruple 1.1-inch (28 mm) mounts; in the 1930s this was considered sufficient. Although the Porters had the same eight 21-inch (533 mm) torpedo tubes as the Farraguts, a full set of reloads was carried. The class was initially equipped with the Mark 11 or Mark 12 torpedo, which were replaced by the Mark 15 beginning in 1938. The heavy armament proved top-heavy, and aircraft were becoming a greater threat, so during World War II on most of the class, mounts 51 and 54 were replaced with dual-purpose (surface action and air action) twin mounts, and the original 1.1-inch guns were replaced with 40 mm Bofors and 20 mm Oerlikons. In some ships, mount 52 was replaced by a quadruple 40 mm mount, and mount 53 became a single 5 in/38 cal dual-purpose mount. Additional 40 mm guns were added amidships along with 20 mm weapons. In most ships, four K-gun depth charge throwers were added to augment the as-built pair of depth charge racks. In some cases (DD-357, DD-359, DD-360) late in the war, the torpedo tubes, two K-guns, and one depth charge rack were landed, to accommodate additional light AA armament, for a total of sixteen 40 mm in three quadruple and two twin mounts and four 20 mm in two twin mounts.

== Service ==
McDougal, Winslow, and Moffett were among the five destroyers and two cruisers that supported the Roosevelt-Churchill conference at Placentia Bay near Argentia, Newfoundland that resulted in the Atlantic Charter in August 1941. Selfridge and Phelps were in port during the attack on Pearl Harbor on 7 December 1941 and engaged enemy aircraft. The class served in the Battle of the Atlantic, in the Pacific War, and escorted convoys in the Americas. Phelps was at the Battle of the Coral Sea and the Battle of Midway, scuttling the disabled aircraft carrier Lexington with torpedoes at the former battle and picking up some of the crew from the sea following the orderly ship abandonment. Balch rescued survivors of the aircraft carrier Yorktown at Midway. While operating out of Trinidad in the Caribbean, Moffett assisted in sinking two U-boats, U-128 and U-604. Notable engagements for other ships of the class included the invasion of Guadalcanal and the Marianas campaign. By September 1944 the class was concentrated in the Atlantic. Porter was the class's only loss, in the Battle of the Santa Cruz Islands on 26 October 1942. Selfridge lost her bow to a torpedo in the Naval Battle of Vella Lavella on 6 October 1943, but was repaired. McDougal and Winslow were reclassified as AG-126 and AG-127 in September 1945 and modified for anti-kamikaze research in a similar configuration to Gearing-class radar picket destroyers. All except Winslow were scrapped shortly after the war; Winslow remained in service as a training ship until 1950 and was scrapped in 1959. Winslow was the longest serving by far of all destroyers commissioned in the 1930s and the last by far to go to the ship breakers.

== Ships in class ==
Construction data
Name	Hull no.	Builder	Laid down	Launched	Comm.	Decomm.	Fate
Porter	DD-356	New York Shipbuilding	18 December 1933	12 December 1935	27 August 1936	—N/a	Lost in the Battle of the Santa Cruz Islands, 26 October 1942
Selfridge	DD-357	New York Shipbuilding	18 December 1933	18 April 1936	25 November 1936	15 October 1945	Scrapped 1946
McDougal	DD-358	New York Shipbuilding	18 December 1933	17 July 1936	23 December 1936	24 June 1946	Reclassified AG-126 17 September 1945, scrapped 1949
Winslow	DD-359	New York Shipbuilding	18 December 1933	21 September 1936	17 February 1937	28 June 1950	Reclassified AG-127 17 September 1945, scrapped 1959
Phelps	DD-360	Fore River Shipbuilding	2 January 1934	18 July 1935	26 February 1936	6 November 1945	Scrapped 1947
Clark	DD-361	Fore River Shipbuilding	2 January 1934	15 October 1935	20 May 1936	23 October 1945	Scrapped 1946
Moffett	DD-362	Fore River Shipbuilding	2 January 1934	11 December 1935	28 August 1936	2 November 1945	Scrapped 1947
Balch	DD-363	Fore River Shipbuilding	16 May 1934	24 March 1936	20 October 1936	19 October 1945	Scrapped 1946

== See also ==
- Somers-class destroyer
