= USS Sampson (DD-394) =

Somers-class destroyer

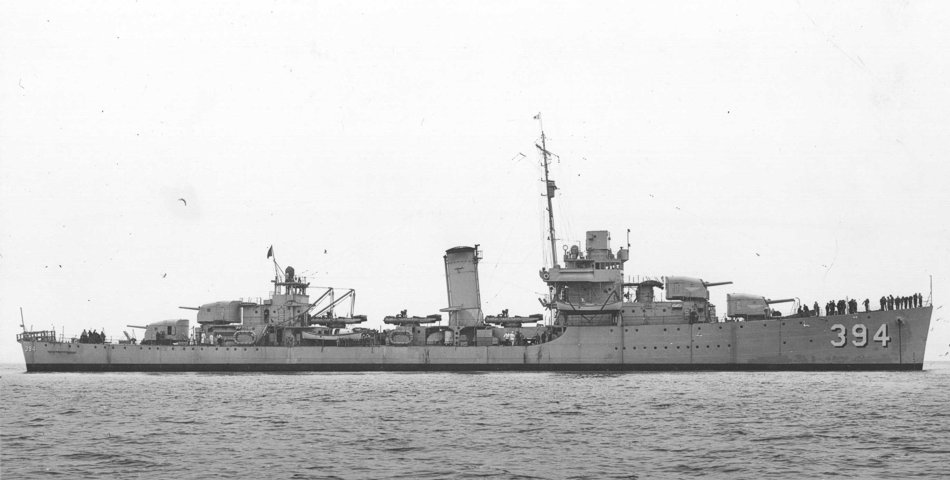
- USS Sampson DD-394

History

United States
- Namesake: William Thomas Sampson
- Builder: Bath Iron Works
- Laid down: 8 April 1936
- Launched: 16 April 1938
- Commissioned: 19 August 1938
- Decommissioned: 1 November 1945
- Stricken: 28 November 1945
- Fate: Scrapped 29 March 1946

General characteristics
- Class & type: Somers class destroyer
- Displacement: 2130 tons
- Length: 381 ft (116 m)
- Beam: 36 ft 2 in (11.02 m)
- Draught: 10 ft 4 in (3.15 m)
- Speed: 32 kt
- Complement: 287
- Armament: 4x2 5 in (130 mm) SP guns; 3x4 21" torpedo tubes

The second USS Sampson (DD-394) was a Somers-class destroyer in the United States Navy. She was named of William Thomas Sampson a rear admiral known for his victory in the Battle of Santiago de Cuba during the Spanish–American War.

Sampson was laid down on 8 April 1936 by Bath Iron Works, Bath, Maine, launched on 16 April 1938, sponsored by Mrs Louisa Smith Thayer, commissioned at the Boston Navy Yard on 19 August 1938.

== Pre-War ==
Following shakedown in European waters in October and November, Sampson returned to Boston, Massachusetts where she was assigned to the Battle Force of the United States Fleet.

Sampson sailed from Boston on 8 March 1939 to take part in combined fleet maneuvers off Cuba and Puerto Rico. She returned from this duty to Yorktown, Virginia, on 12 April and stood out from Hampton Roads on 20 April and headed for the United States west coast. She arrived at San Diego, California on 12 May 1939 and spent the next year training in fleet tactics along the western seaboard, taking part in the combined battle practice and maneuvers of the Battle Force off the Hawaiian Islands from 1 April to 20 June 1940. She cleared San Diego on 5 July to base her operations from Norfolk, Virginia arriving on the 20th. She then cruised through the Caribbean Sea, from 14 November to 15 December, transporting a government mission which was compiling an economic survey of the British West Indies.

Sampson then continued operations out of Norfolk, engaged in Neutrality Patrol along the eastern seaboard to various ports of the Caribbean Sea. Early in August, Sampson and a screen of four other destroyers, USS McDougal, USS Madison, USS Moffett, and USS Winslow joined the cruiser Tuscaloosa in escorting Augusta as that heavy cruiser carried President Franklin D. Roosevelt to NS Argentia, Newfoundland, to meet British Prime Minister Winston Churchill in the conference which resulted in the Atlantic Charter. On 3 September 1941, she got underway from Boston Harbor to escort convoys and to search for enemy submarines in shipping lanes running from Newfoundland to Iceland. She arrived at Hvalfjordur, Iceland, on 16 September and cleared that port on 23 October in the escort screen of a merchant convoy that reached Boston on 4 November.

== Pre-war convoys escorted ==
Convoy	Escort Group	Dates	Notes
HX 153		7-13 Oct 1941	from Newfoundland to Iceland prior to US declaration of war
ON 28		25 Oct-3 Nov 1941	from Iceland to Newfoundland prior to US declaration of war

== World War II ==
With the Japanese attack on Pearl Harbor and the subsequent United States declaration of war, Sampson patrolled, with Warrington (DD-383), off Newport, Rhode Island from 23 December 1941 to 12 January 1942 when the two destroyers set course for the Panama Canal Zone. Sampson arrived at Balboa on 17 January to join the Southeast Pacific Forces based there. She took part in the search, from 25 to 29 January, to locate submarine S-26 (SS-131) which had been sunk on the night of 24 January after a surface collision with USS Sturdy (PC-460), 12 miles west of Isla San José in Panama Bay.

On 1 February, she sailed from Balboa in the escort for twelve troopships. On 12 February, she broke off from the convoy to inspect the Marquesas Islands. She arrived at Bora Bora, Society Islands, on 18 February and patrolled a station off Teavanui Harbor until 9 March when she set course, in company with cruiser Trenton, for Panama and reached Balboa on 23 March. Sampson spent the next year in a series of coastal patrol sweeps from Balboa to waters off South America, making calls at such ports as Guayaquil, Ecuador; Valparaíso, Chile; and Callao, Peru. She varied this service with escort voyages from Balboa to the Society and Galapagos Islands.

Sampson returned from her last cruise along the South American coast to Balboa, on 7 May 1943 and cleared port on 23 May as one of the escorts for a troopship convoy which reached Noumea, New Caledonia, on 13 June. The next day, she sailed for Bora Bora, Society Islands and returned to Nouméa with a convoy of troopships on 8 July. Two days later, she set course for a point of rendezvous off Pago Pago, American Samoa, meeting up with the destroyer Warrington, then proceeded to Pearl Harbor arriving on the 20th.

On 27 July, the two destroyers cleared Pearl Harbor escorting four Army troopships bound for Australia and reached Sydney on 8 August. She got underway the next day and arrived at Nouméa, New Caledonia, on 12 August 1943. During the following months, Sampson alternately based her operations at Nouméa and Espiritu Santo, New Hebrides Islands making escort voyages to Guadalcanal, or Purvis Bay, Florida, Solomon Islands. On the night of 2 and 3 October, while escorting a convoy from Nouméa to Espiritu Santo, she fired at an enemy submarine and after the vessel submerged, dropped depth charges.

=== 1944 ===
On 15 March 1944, Sampson cleared Espiritu Santo as one of four destroyers screening the escort carriers, Natoma Bay (CVE-62) and Manila Bay (CVE-61). Later that day, four battleships and more destroyers joined the formation. This force struck Kavieng, New Ireland and nearby airfields in an air and sea bombardment on 20 March while the 4th Marine Regiment made an unopposed landing to occupy Emirau Island, a base from which the north coast of New Ireland could be kept under surveillance. After guarding the escort carriers while they launched strikes against Kavieng and providing air cover for reinforcement convoys to Emirau, Sampson joined a convoy at Port Purvis on Florida Island, in the Solomons and escorted it to Espiritu Santo. On 11 April, she received the armed guard crew from the merchant ship, Titan, stranded on Cook Reef and transferred them to Celtic in Port Havannah, Efate, New Hebrides.

Sampson cleared Port Havannah on 17 April and after escorting Ataseosa to Kukum Beach, arrived off of Guadalcanal on the 20th, joining troopships which reached Borgen Bay, New Britain Island, on 25 April. After guarding one more convoy shuttling troops between Guadalcanal and Borgen Bay, she steamed to Milne Bay, New Guinea, where she arrived on 11 May.

There she joined the 7th Fleet and, while at Cape Sudest, New Guinea, on 20 May, became the flagship of Rear Admiral W. M. Fechteler, Commander, Task Force 77. She shifted to Humboldt Bay, Hollandia, New Guinea, on 22 May. Three days later, Major General Horace H. Fuller, the commander of the 41st United States Army Division, came on board Sampson with his staff. Rear Admiral Fechteler commanded the naval elements and the amphibious aspects of the landing to be made at on Biak Island, Schouten Islands, while Major General Fuller directed the ground forces. The task force sailed that evening and Sampson arrived with her attack force before daybreak of 27 May.

Following naval bombardment, the first wave of troops landed. The cruisers shelled the Japanese airstrip to the west of the beachhead while the destroyers attacked targets near the landing area.

In the late afternoon of 27 May, four twin-engined Japanese aircraft were seen and engaged by anti-aircraft guns, both on ship and ashore. Two were claimed destroyed and one flew off smoking. The pilot of a fourth aircraft attempted to crash into Sampson when anti-aircraft fire shot off a part of its wing. This raider passed over Sampson's bridge hit the water and was thrown into the submarine chaser SC-699 causing a fire and some damage. At 1707, Sampson departed with eight LST's and several other ships and arrived in Humboldt Bay the next day.

Sampson got underway from Cape Sudest on 5 June for Cristobal, in the Canal Zone, where she reported for duty to the United States Atlantic Fleet on 25 June. Three days later, she sailed as the escort for troopship, General Tasker H. Bliss, and arrived at the New York Navy Yard on 4 July. She became flagship of Capt. H. T. Read, Commander, Task Force 63, on 19 July and shifted to Hampton Roads, on 21 July in preparation for transatlantic, convoy-escort duty. Three days later, she sailed as flagship of the escort for Convoy UGS-49 which reached Bizerte, Tunisia, on 13 August. She returned to New York, guarding a westward convoy, on 8 September 1944 and made four subsequent round trips to the Mediterranean, finally arriving at Boston on 19 May 1945.

=== 1945 ===
Sampson remained in the Boston Navy Yard until 1 July when she sailed for the Chesapeake. She arrived at Annapolis, Maryland, on 3 July to embark midshipmen for a training cruise and put to sea on the 7th with a task group for battle practice off Cuba, Puerto Rico and the Virginia Capes until 30 July when she arrived at Hampton Roads. She again sailed from Norfolk on 19 August for training operations out of Guantanamo Bay and returned from this cruise to the Philadelphia Naval Shipyard on 16 September for inactivation overhaul.

She was decommissioned on 1 November 1945, struck from the Navy list on 28 November and sold for scrap on 29 March 1946.

== Honors ==
Sampson earned one battle star for World War II service.

== See also ==
- List of United States Navy destroyers
