= USS Madison (DD-425) =

Benson-class destroyer

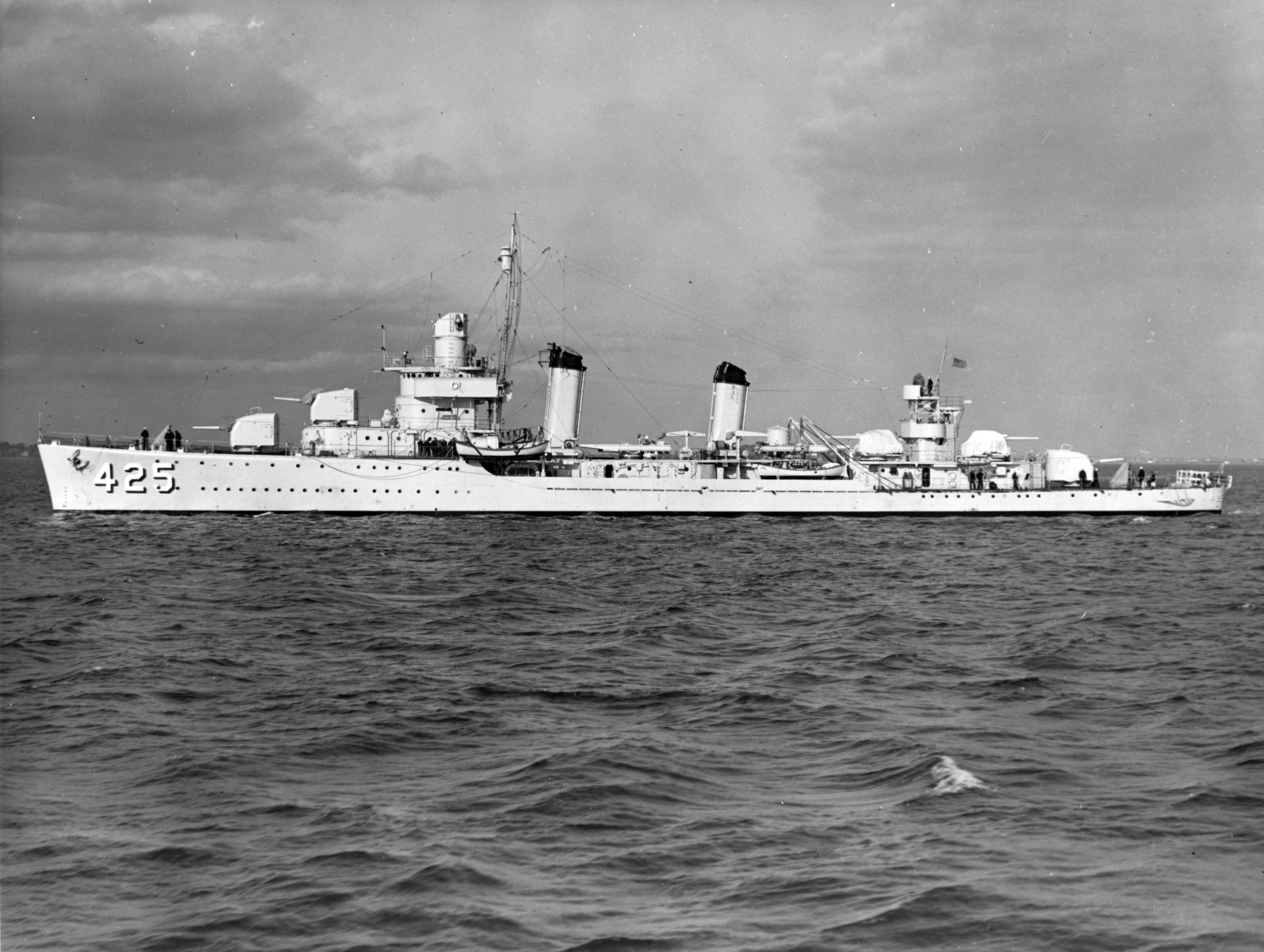
- USS Madison (DD-425) in October 1940

History

United States
- Name: USS Madison (DD-425)
- Namesake: James J. Madison
- Ordered: 1938
- Builder: Boston Navy Yard
- Laid down: 19 September 1938
- Launched: 20 October 1939
- Commissioned: 6 August 1940
- Decommissioned: 13 March 1946
- Stricken: 1 June 1968
- Fate: Sunk as target, 14 October 1969

General characteristics
- Class & type: Benson-class destroyer
- Displacement: 1,620 tons
- Length: 347 ft 7 in (105.94 m)
- Beam: 36 ft 11 in (11.25 m)
- Draft: 11 ft 9 in (3.58 m)
- Propulsion: 50,000 shp (37 MW); 4 boilers; 2 propellers
- Speed: 35 knots (65 km/h)
- Range: 6,500 nautical miles at 12 kn (12,000 km at 22 km/h)
- Complement: 235
- Armament: 5 × 5 in (127 mm) DP guns, 6 × 0.50 in (12.7 mm) guns, 10 × 21 in (53 cm) torpedo tubes, 2 × depth charge tracks

USS Madison (DD-425) was a Benson-class destroyer in the United States Navy during World War II. She is the third Navy ship of that name, and the first named for Commander James J. Madison (1888–1922), who was awarded the Medal of Honor during World War I.

Madison was laid down on 19 September 1938 by the Boston Navy Yard; launched on 20 October 1939; sponsored by Mrs. Ethel Madison Meyn, widow of Commander Madison; and commissioned on 6 August 1940.

== Pre World War II service ==
Prior to the entry of the United States into World War II, the destroyer saw over a year's service opposing the spread of Axis power. In addition to Neutrality Patrol in the Caribbean and North Atlantic convoy duty, she was escort on two diplomatic voyages. In January 1941, she escorted Tuscaloosa as the cruiser carried Admiral William D. Leahy to Portugal en route to France to become Ambassador to the Vichy France Government. In August, along with Tuscaloosa and a screen of four other destroyers, USS McDougal, USS Moffett, USS Sampson, and USS Winslow, Madison escorted Augusta, carrying President Franklin D. Roosevelt to Argentia Bay and a top secret rendezvous with HMS Prince of Wales, carrying British Prime Minister Winston Churchill that resulted in the Atlantic Charter signing.

== Mediterranean and Arctic convoys ==
Following the formulation of the Atlantic Charter, Madison returned to convoy and patrol duty. She operated in the North Atlantic and along the east coast until the spring of 1942. On 4 April Madison put into Scapa Flow and became a unit of the British Home Fleet. Steaming at first between Greenock, Scotland and the Mediterranean, Madison was with Wasp when that aircraft carrier delivered Supermarine Spitfires to the besieged island of Malta. These planes enabled the residents to hold on to their position, preventing Axis air supremacy in the western Mediterranean, and providing a future logistics base for the Allies. Returning from this mission, Madison patrolled the North Sea and the convoy routes to Murmansk.

== Operation Torch ==
Resuming operations as part of the Atlantic Fleet, Madison took up her convoy duty anew. She made quick trips to Panama, the gulf ports and various ports in the United Kingdom. On 2 November, she departed New York City for Casablanca with convoy UGF 2 of troops and supplies to support the initial invasion of north Africa. Arriving in mid-November, she remained on local patrol and escort duty off Casablanca until the end of the year.

== Convoy duty, Operation Shingle and Anvil-Dragoon ==
Standing out of New York 30 January 1943, the destroyer made one convoy run to Derry, Northern Ireland, before commencing, in February, "oil runs" from Curaçao to the United Kingdom. For the remainder of the year, she continued to escort convoys of tankers and other types of merchant ships between the Netherlands West Indies, New York, north Africa, and various United Kingdom and Mediterranean ports.

Madison's next assignment was to the Mediterranean. Arriving at Oran, Algeria, 30 January 1944, she practiced shore bombardment before departing for Italy on 11 February. Operating off Anzio, she continued antisubmarine patrols and provided antiaircraft protection and support gunfire until mid-April, when she commenced convoy and patrol duty throughout the Mediterranean. In August, Madison once again joined the support force for a landing, this time in the south of France. During Operation Dragoon, Madison, on antisubmarine patrol and fire support duty on 10 September, made four certain kills of human torpedoes and one probable.

== Convoys escorted ==
Convoy	Escort Group	Dates	Notes
ON 18		24 Sept-2 Oct 1941	from Iceland to Newfoundland prior to US declaration of war
HX 154		12-19 Oct 1941	from Newfoundland to Iceland prior to US declaration of war
ON 30		2-9 Nov 1941	from Iceland to Newfoundland prior to US declaration of war
HX 162		29 Nov-7 Dec 1941	from Newfoundland to Iceland prior to US declaration of war
HX 169		10-18 Jan 1942	from Newfoundland to Iceland
ON 59		29 Jan-5 Feb 1942	from Iceland to Newfoundland
AT 18		6-17 Aug 1942	troopships from New York City to Firth of Clyde
UGF 2		2-18 Nov 1942	from Chesapeake Bay to Morocco
UC 1		15 Feb-6 March 1943	from Liverpool to Curacao
CU 1		20 March-1 April 1943	from Curaçao to Liverpool
UC 2		9–23 April 1943	from Liverpool to Curaçao
CU 2		21 May-5 June 1943	from Curaçao to Liverpool
UC 3		10–26 June 1943	from Liverpool to Curaçao
CU 3		11–24 July 1943	from Curaçao to Firth of Clyde
UC 3A		30 July-10 Aug 1943	from Liverpool to Curaçao
CU 4		26 Aug-9 Sept 1943	from Curaçao to Liverpool
UC 4		15-27 Sept 1943	from Liverpool to Curaçao

== Pacific service ==
Returning home in January 1945, Madison escorted one more convoy to Mediterranean ports and returned before departing the east coast 21 April for the Pacific Ocean, arriving Guam on 1 July. Following a convoy run to Okinawa and back, Madison was assigned to a picket station off Ulithi. On 2 August, she raced to the site of the loss of Indianapolis to search for survivors. Later, she steamed to Tokyo Bay to witness the formal surrender of the Japanese forces.

== End of World War II and fate ==
Following the war's end, Madison remained with the occupation forces until 5 November when she sailed for Charleston, South Carolina. Having steamed more than 300,000 miles (550,000 km) during the course of the war, Madison arrived at Charleston 7 December 1945. She was placed out of commission in reserve 13 March 1946 at Charleston and later moved to Orange, Texas. She was struck from the Navy List 1 June 1968. She was sunk as target off southeastern Florida on 14 October 1969.

== Awards ==
Madison received five battle stars for World War II service.
