= USS Moffett =

Porter-class destroyer

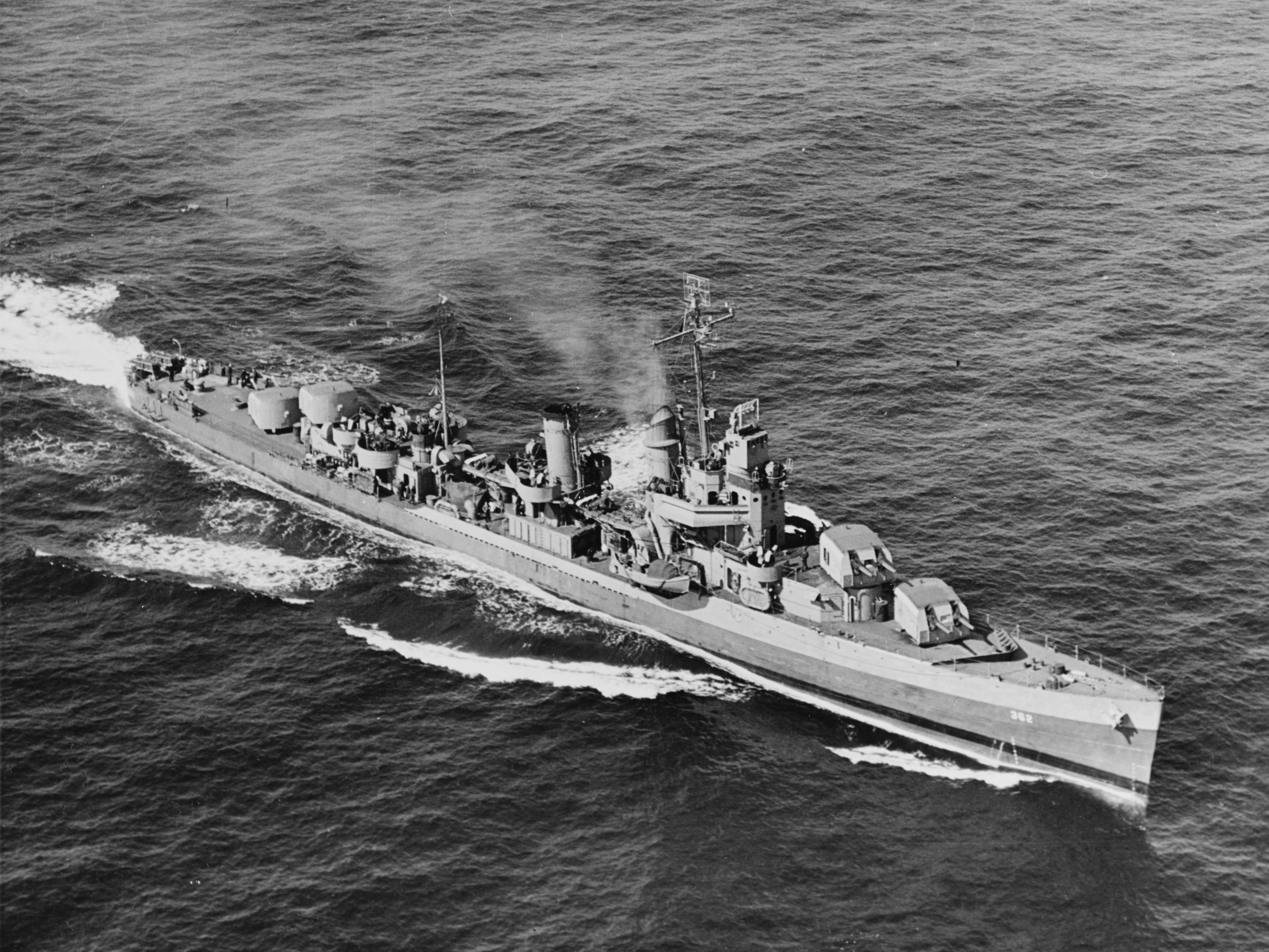
- USS Moffett underway on 26 March 1944

History

United States
- Name: Moffett (DD-362)
- Namesake: William Moffett
- Builder: Bethlehem Shipbuilding Corporation's Fore River Shipyard in Quincy, Massachusetts
- Laid down: 2 January 1934
- Launched: 11 December 1935
- Commissioned: 28 August 1936
- Decommissioned: 2 November 1945
- Stricken: 28 January 1947
- Fate: Sold for scrapping 16 May 1947

General characteristics
- Class & type: Porter-class destroyer
- Displacement: 1,850 tons
- Length: 381 ft 1 in (116.15 m)
- Beam: 36 ft 11 in (11.25 m)
- Draught: 10 ft 4 in (3.15 m)
- Speed: 37 knots (69 km/h)
- Complement: 194 officers and enlisted
- Armament: As built: 1 × Mk33 Gun Fire Control System, 8 × 5"(127mm)/38cal SP (4x2), 8 × 1.1" (28mm) AA (2x4), 8 × 21"(533mm) T Tubes (2x4), 2 × Depth Charge Stern Racks; c1945: 1 × Mk37 Gun Fire Control System, 5 × 5"(127mm)/38cal DP (2x2, 1x1), 4 × Mk51 Gun Directors, 12 × Bofors 40mm AA (2x4,2x2), 6 × Oerlikon 20mm AA (6x1), 8 × 21"(533mm) T Tubes (2x4), 2 × Depth Charge Stern Racks

USS Moffett (DD-362) was a Porter-class destroyer in the United States Navy. She was named for Admiral William Moffett.

== History ==
Moffett was laid down 2 January 1934 by Bethlehem Shipbuilding Corporation's Fore River Shipyard in Quincy, Massachusetts; launched 11 December 1935; sponsored by Miss Beverly Moffett, daughter of Rear Admiral Moffett; and commissioned at Boston, Massachusetts 28 August 1936.

On 24 April 1941, Moffett left Newport, Rhode Island, her base for Atlantic Fleet operations from commissioning until that point and joined the South Atlantic Neutrality Patrol off Brazil. After the fall of France, she operated out of Puerto Rico with a force guarding against hostile action by a Vichy-inclined admiral commanding the French West Indies fleet based at Martinique and Guadeloupe. She steamed north to New England in August 1941, and was assigned along with the cruiser Tuscaloosa and a screen of four other destroyers, USS McDougal, USS Madison, USS Sampson, and USS Winslow to escort USS Augusta (CA-31), which was carrying President Franklin D. Roosevelt to the Atlantic Charter Conference with British Prime Minister Winston Churchill at NS Argentia, Newfoundland.

For the first 2 years of World War II, Moffett operated with typical destroyer versatility on patrol and convoy duties in the South Atlantic and Caribbean, escort missions bringing her to U.S. ports from time to time. She made several voyages to West African parts in 1943. On 17 May 1943, as she and Jouett were on escort duty in the Caribbean, she learned that patrol planes had spotted and fired upon a German submarine. At 1246, Moffett sighted the German submarine U-128. The two destroyers sank the submarine with 5 inch gunfire, and then rescued 50 survivors including the German commanding officer.

Three months later, while escorting Memphis and a merchant ship to Ascension Island, Moffett made contact with U-604, and again joined Navy aircraft to attack. A running fight ensued through the night, and when the submarine surfaced 95 miles north of Trinidad next morning, Moffett drove her down once more with five hits. Three days later, with the aid of aircraft, contact was regained and the submarine was badly damaged by Moffett's depth charges. In the dark and confusion of action, a friendly aircraft mistaking Moffett for the enemy made two strafing runs which caused minor damage. The stricken submarine was finally scuttled by her crew 11 August; Moffett was credited with the kill.

On 26 March 1944, Moffett sailed as escort commander of Convoy YN-78, a group of tugs, barges, and patrol craft en route to England for the invasion of Normandy. After visiting Wales and Northern Ireland, Moffett returned to New York 11 May.

Moffett's last combat experience came 1 August, when enemy planes attacked Convoy UGS-48 as she screened it en route to Bizerte, Tunisia. Laying smoke to protect the convoy, Moffett went into a series of brilliant tight turns and maneuvers to dodge the torpedo planes which continued to attack through the night, and with other escorts drove them off with antiaircraft fire. She returned to New York from this mission 27 August. After a last escort voyage to Oran in April 1945, Moffett began extended repairs at Boston.

Towed to Charleston, South Carolina, 28 May for further repairs, Moffett was still in the yard at the close of the war in August, and work was stopped.

She was decommissioned in Charleston 2 November 1945 and entered the Reserve Fleet. Stricken from the Navy list 28 January 1947, Moffett was sold for scrapping 16 May 1947 to Boston Metals Company, Baltimore, Maryland.

Moffett received two battle stars for World War II service.
