= USS Porter (DD-356) =

Porter-class destroyer

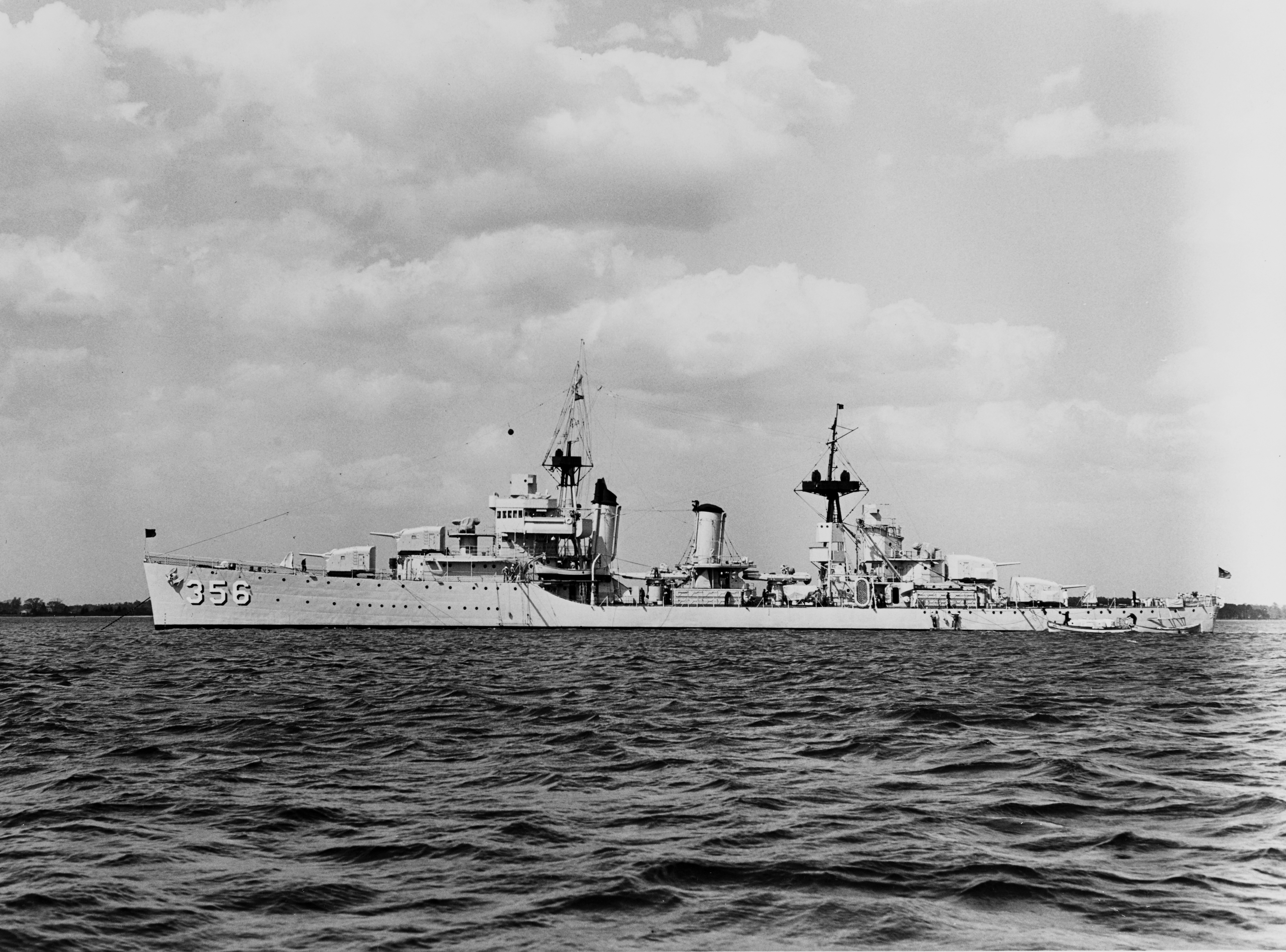
- USS Porter on 19 April 1939

History

United States
- Name: Porter
- Builder: New York Shipbuilding Corporation
- Laid down: 18 December 1933
- Launched: 12 December 1935
- Commissioned: 25 August 1936
- Stricken: 2 November 1942
- Fate: Scuttled following Battle of the Santa Cruz Islands, 26 October 1942

General characteristics
- Class & type: Porter-class destroyer
- Displacement: 1,850 tons
- Length: 381 ft (116 m)
- Beam: 36 ft 2 in (11.02 m)
- Draft: 10 ft 5 in (3.18 m)
- Propulsion: 50,000 shp (37,285 kW) geared turbines; 2 screws
- Speed: 35 knots (65 km/h)
- Range: 6,500 nmi. at 12 knots; (12,000 km at 22 km/h)
- Complement: 194
- Armament: As built: 2 × Mk33 Gun Fire Control System; 8 × 5" (127mm)/38cal SP guns (4×2); 8 × 1.1" (28mm) AA (2x4); 8 × 21"(533mm) torpedo tubes (2x4); Circa 1942: 1 × Mk33 Gun Fire Control System; 8 × 5" (127mm)/38cal SP guns (4×2); 2 × 40mm Bofors AA (1x2); 6 × 20mm Oerlikon AA (6x1); 2 × stern depth charge racks

USS Porter (DD-356) was the lead ship of her class of destroyers in the United States Navy. She was the third Navy ship named for Commodore David Porter and his son, Admiral David Dixon Porter.

== Operational history ==
=== Construction ===
Porter was laid down by the New York Shipbuilding Corporation at Camden in New Jersey on 18 December 1933, launched on 12 December 1935 by Miss Carlile Patterson Porter and commissioned at Philadelphia on 27 August 1936.

=== 1936–1941 ===
After shakedown in waters off Northern Europe, Porter visited St. John's, Newfoundland, for ceremonies in honor of the coronation of King George VI and Queen Elizabeth in May 1937 and was at the Washington Navy Yard during the Boy Scout Jamboree, June–July 1937. Then reassigned to the Pacific Fleet, she transited the Panama Canal and arrived at San Francisco, California 5 August 1937. She operated continuously with the Pacific Fleet until the outbreak of World War II, homeported at San Diego, California.

=== World War II ===
On 5 December 1941, Porter got underway from Pearl Harbor, escaping the Japanese attack by two days. She patrolled with cruisers and destroyers in Hawaiian waters before steaming in convoy 25 March 1942 for the west coast. She operated off the west coast with Task Force 1 (TF 1) for the next 4 months. Returning to Pearl Harbor in mid-August, she trained in Hawaiian waters until 16 October when she sortied with TF 16 and headed for the Solomon Islands.

==== Battle of the Santa Cruz Islands ====
On 26 October 1942, TF 16 exchanged air attacks with strong Japanese forces northeast of Guadalcanal in the Battle of the Santa Cruz Islands. During the ensuing action, Porter was torpedoed, and, after the crew had abandoned ship, was sunk by gunfire from Shaw, which unlike the Porter, hadn't escaped the attack on Pearl Harbor. Authorities differ as to the source of the torpedo which sank Porter. Author Eric Hammel states Porter was sunk by a single torpedo, part of a three-torpedo spread fired from Japanese submarine I-21. However, author Richard B. Frank states that Japanese records do not support this, and that, more likely, an errant torpedo from a ditching US Navy Grumman TBF Avenger hit Porter and caused the fatal damage. Her name was struck from the Navy List 2 November 1942.

Porter earned one battle star for World War II service.
