= USS Balch (DD-363) =

Porter-class destroyer

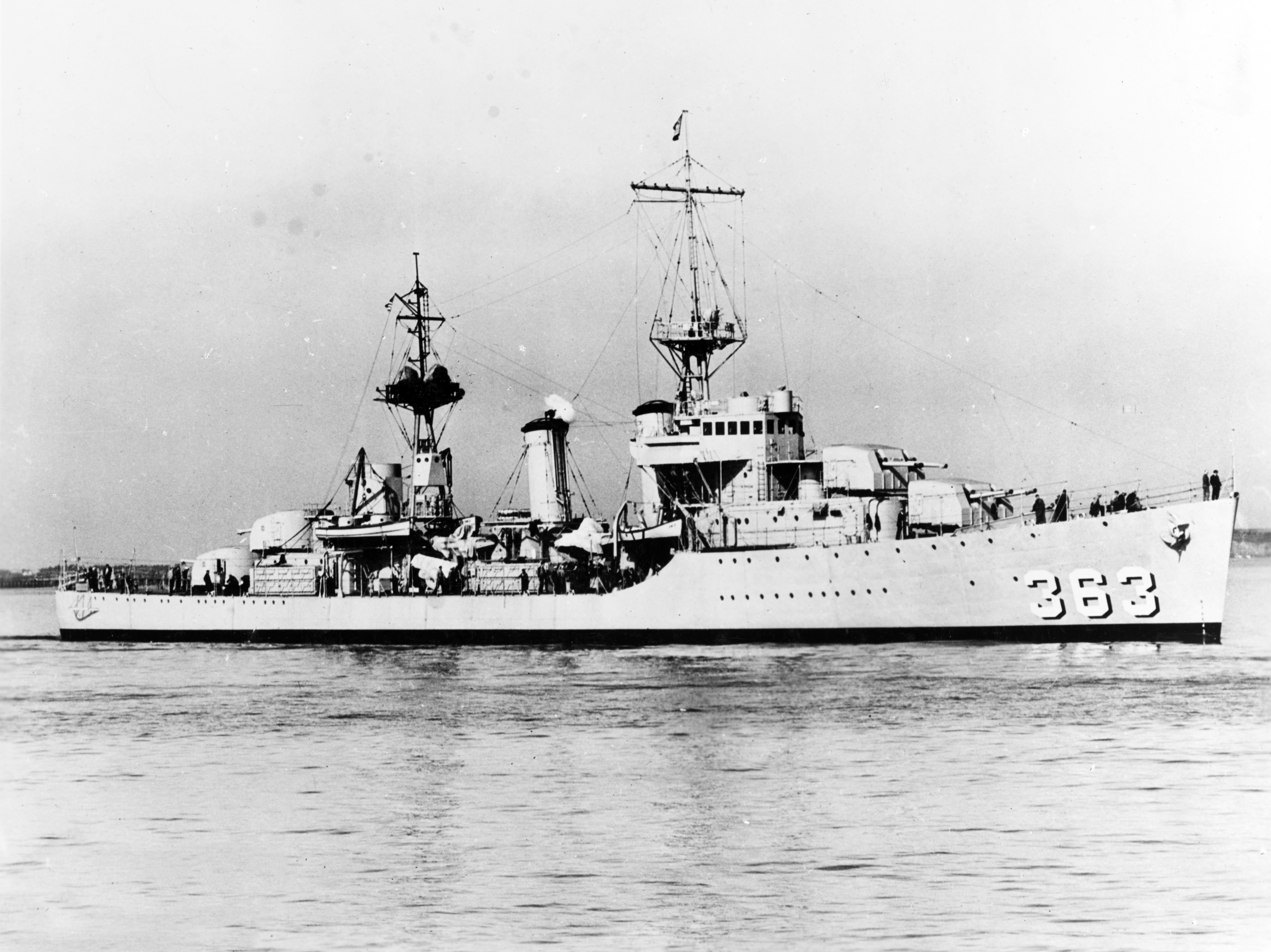
- USS Balch, 23 September 1936

History

United States
- Builder: Bethlehem Shipbuilding Corporation's Fore River Shipyard in Quincy, Massachusetts
- Laid down: 16 May 1934
- Launched: 24 March 1936
- Commissioned: 20 October 1936
- Decommissioned: 19 October 1945
- Stricken: 1 November 1945
- Honors and awards: 6 × battle stars
- Fate: Scrapped in 1946

General characteristics
- Class & type: Porter-class destroyer
- Displacement: 1,850 tons
- Length: 381 ft 1 in (116.15 m)
- Beam: 36 ft 11 in (11.25 m)
- Draught: 17 ft 9 in (5.41 m)
- Speed: 35 knots (65 km/h)
- Complement: 194 officers and enlisted
- Armament: As built: 1 x Mk 35 Gun Fire Control System, 8 x 5"(127 mm)/38 cal SP (4x2), 8 x 1.1" (28 mm) AA (2x4), 8 x 21 inch (533 mm) torpedo tubes (2x4), 2 x Depth Charge Stern Racks; c1943: 1 x Mk 33 Gun Fire Control System, 8 x 5" (127 mm)/38 cal SP (3x2), 4 x Mk 51 Gun Directors, 12 x Bofors 40 mm guns (2x4,2x2), 6 x Oerlikon 20 mm cannons (6x1), 8 x 21" (533 mm) torpedo tubes (2x4), 2 x Depth Charge Stern Racks, 4 x Depth Charge K-gun Projectors (4x1)

USS Balch (DD-363) was a Porter-class destroyer in the United States Navy. She is named for Admiral George Beall Balch.

== Construction and commissioning ==
The second Balch was launched 24 March 1936 by Bethlehem Shipbuilding Corporation's Fore River Shipyard in Quincy, Massachusetts; sponsored by Miss Gertrude Balch, granddaughter of Admiral Balch; and commissioned 20 October 1936.

== Service history ==
After her commissioning, Balch operated for a period under the Chief of Naval Operations. She departed Newport, Rhode Island, for the Pacific in October 1937, and upon arrival at San Diego, California, she joined Destroyer Division 7, Battle Force. Thereafter as flagship of Destroyer Squadron 12 and later of Destroyer Squadron 6, she participated in fleet training, cruises, and battle problems in the Pacific and Haitian-Caribbean area. After participating in Fleet Problem XXI at Pearl Harbor, Balch steamed to Mare Island Navy Yard, where she underwent a yard period in the spring of 1940. Upon the completion of her yard period, she made six cruises alternately between the Hawaiian Islands and the West Coast (August 1940-December 1941).

=== World War II ===
On 1 December 1941, Balch put to sea as a unit of Task Force 8 and remained with the task force after the Pearl Harbor attack. She cruised in the Pacific during the early months of the war, and participated in the bombardment of Tarawa Island, Marshall Islands (1 February 1942). Between February 1942 and June 1944, Balch performed widespread screening, patrolling, and fire-support duties during the Wake Island raid (24 February 1942), the Doolittle Raid (18 April 1942), the decisive Battle of Midway (4–7 June), during which she rescued 545 survivors of Yorktown; Guadalcanal landings (7–30 August); Attu invasion (11 May-2 June 1943); Toem-Wakde-Sarmi landings (25–28 May 1944); and Biak Island invasion (28 May-18 June).

On 15 July 1944, Balch arrived at New York City. Between 2 August 1944 and 23 May 1945, she completed five trans-Atlantic convoy escort crossings to various North African ports.

She formed part of Task Group 60.11 until 8 May 1945 (VE Day). During this time, she rescued 46 survivors from a torpedoed SS Belgium (14 April) and also anchored at Oran, Algeria, and passed thru the Straits of Gibraltar.

On 16 June 1945, she commenced her preinactivation overhaul at Philadelphia, Pennsylvania. She was decommissioned 19 October 1945 and scrapped in 1946.

== Awards ==
Balch received six battle stars for her Pacific service during World War II.
