= SS Twilight =

SS Twilight may refer to one of two Type C2-S-B1 ships built for the United States Maritime Commission:

- SS Twilight (1942) (MC hull number 288), built by Moore Dry Dock in Oakland, California; later became USS Ormsby (AP-94/APA-49); scrapped in 1969 after accident
- SS Twilight (1946) (MC hull number 2823), built by Consolidated Steel in Wilmington, California; scrapped in 1973
