= USS Ormsby =

US naval ship

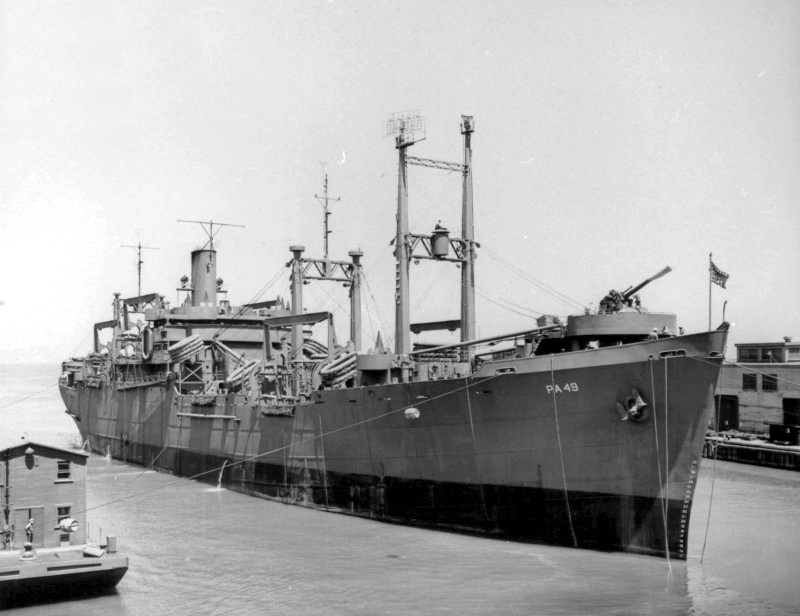
- Ormsby at Mare Island Navy Yard, 17 July 1943

History

United States
- Name: USS Ormsby (APA-49)
- Namesake: Ormsby County, Nevada
- Builder: Moore Dry Dock
- Laid down: 21 July 1942
- Launched: 20 October 1942
- Christened: Twilight
- Acquired: 10 March 1943
- Commissioned: 28 June 1943
- Decommissioned: 15 March 1946
- Renamed: USS Ormsby (APA-49), American Producer
- Reclassified: AP-94 to APA-49, 1 February 1943
- Stricken: 17 April 1946
- Identification: MCV Hull Type C2-S-B1, MCV Hull No. 288
- Honours and awards: Six battle stars for World War II service
- Fate: Scrapped July 1969 after accident

General characteristics
- Class & type: Ormsby-class attack transport
- Displacement: 7,300 tons (lt), 13,910 t. (fl)
- Length: 459 ft 3 in
- Beam: 63 ft
- Draft: 24 ft
- Propulsion: 1 x General Electric geared drive turbine, 2 x Foster-Wheeler D-type boilers, 1 x propeller, designed shaft horsepower 6,000
- Speed: 17 knots
- Capacity: Troops: 83 Officers, 1,465 Enlisted; Cargo: 150,000 cu ft, 2,700 tons
- Complement: Officers 46, Enlisted 478
- Armament: 2 x 5"/38 caliber dual-purpose gun mounts, 2 x Bofors 40mm gun mounts, 4 x twin 20mm gun, 18 x 20mm single gun mounts.

USS Ormsby (APA-49) was an Ormsby-class attack transport that served with the US Navy from 1943 to 1946. She was subsequently sold into commercial service and was scrapped in 1969.

== History ==
Ormsby (APA-49) was named after a county in Nevada. She was originally laid down by the Moore Dry Dock Company of Oakland, California on 21 July 1942 as SS Twilight; authorized for acquisition as Ormsby AP-94 on 5 October 1942; launched 20 October 1942; reclassified APA-49 on 1 February 1943; acquired 10 March 1943; and commissioned 28 June 1943.

Upon completion of her conversion and shakedown in July 1943, Ormsby sailed from San Francisco en route to San Diego to load Marines and cargo for Pearl Harbor. From Pearl she loaded more Marines, Seabees and equipment and departed 14 August for Nukufetau in the Ellice Islands.

=== Invasion of Tarawa ===
Continuing southward, she stopped in Pago Pago, Samoa, and then sailed on to Wellington, New Zealand, arriving on 11 September. There she embarked Marines and carried out amphibious warfare training until the end of October. From Wellington, New Zealand Ormsby steamed via Efate to Tarawa, Gilbert Islands and landed her troops there for that historic battle on 20 November 1943. Returning to Pearl Harbor on 7 December she again loaded troops and supplies and conducted training through January 1944.

=== Invasions of Kwajalein and New Guinea ===
On 31 January Ormsby participated in another amphibious assault landing her troops at Kwajalein in the Marshalls. Following this operation, she moved on to Guadalcanal in February and trained Army units until 28 March, when she landed reinforcements at Bougainville and continued to Milne Bay, New Guinea. In April she sailed to Buna, Finschafen and then to Aitape, New Guinea where on the 23rd army assault troops were landed. A reinforcement voyage to Aitape followed on 3 May.

=== Invasion of Guam ===
Returning to the Russell Islands and Guadalcanal, Ormsby loaded Marines of the First Provisional Brigade, trained then in May, and landed them on Guam 21 July. While at Guam she suffered her only casualties of the war when one officer and an enlisted man were killed as a shell hit in the bow.

=== Invasions of Peleliu and Leyte ===
Ormsby trained Marines of the famed 1st Marine Division at Guadalcanal prior to landing them at Pelelieu, Palau Islands. Proceeding to Hollandia and loading Army units, she made another assault at Leyte in the Philippines on 20 October with a rerun on 14 November.

In the latter part of November Ormsby was finally given a rest and she returned to the United States for availability.

Leaving California behind, Ormsby with Seabees from Port Hueneme set course for Guam, arriving on 11 April 1945 and then returning to Portland, Oregon on 22 May with a full load of returning service veterans.

=== After hostilities ===
Making another Magic Carpet run with veterans in June, Ormsby returned to San Francisco via Tinian and Saipan from Guam on 13 July. She departed San Francisco on 31 July en route to Manila to lift members of the 43rd Division to Tokyo, arriving there on 13 September.

==== Transport missions ====
Weathering a typhoon she returned to Guam and embarked troops for Qingdao, China participating in the occupation landings there. Underway on 17 October, Ormsby sailed first to Manila and then to Haiphong, French Indochina where she embarked the 62nd Chinese Army for Formosa. She landed the Chinese occupation forces at Port Saei on 18 November and sailed for Manila arriving 21 November.

In December Ormsby made one more Magic Carpet voyage to Portland, Oregon, arriving on the 20th. This was her final passage after untiring war effort.

=== Decommissioning ===
Ormsby decommissioned 15 March 1946 and was struck from the U.S. Naval Register on 17 April 1946. She was delivered to the War Shipping Administration on 16 May 1946.

== Commercial service ==
Ormsby was eventually acquired for commercial service by United States Lines and renamed SS American Producer. In March 1969, American Producer was severely damaged after striking the pier at San Francisco while outbound for Da Nang, Vietnam, with a cargo of bombs. Consequently, she was scrapped at Kaohsiung, Taiwan, in July 1969.

== Awards ==
Ormsby earned six battle stars for service in World War II.
