= Ormsby-class attack transport =

WWII-era US Navy ship class

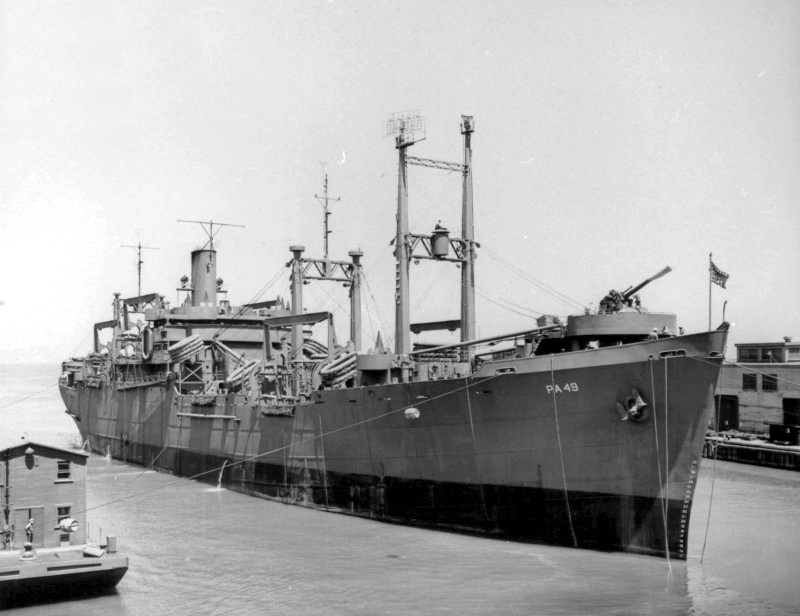
- USS Ormsby (APA-49), lead ship of the Ormsby class

Class overview
- Name: Ormsby class
- Builders: Moore Dry Dock
- Operators: United States Navy
- Preceded by: Windsor class
- Succeeded by: Bayfield class
- In commission: 28 June 1943 – 15 March 1946
- Completed: 3
- Active: None

General characteristics
- Class & type: Ormsby-class attack transport
- Displacement: 7,300 tons (lt), 13,910 t. (fl)
- Length: 459 ft 3 in (139.98 m)
- Beam: 63 ft (19 m)
- Draft: 24 ft (7.3 m)
- Propulsion: 1 x General Electric geared drive turbine, 2 x Foster-Wheeler D-type boilers, 1 x propeller, designed shaft horsepower 6,000
- Speed: 16 - 16.5 knots
- Capacity: Troops: Officer 83-91 Enlisted 1,465-1475 Cargo: 150,000 cu ft, 2,700 tons
- Complement: 42-46 officers, 478 enlisted
- Armament: 2 x 5"/38 caliber dual-purpose gun mounts, 2 x Bofors 40mm gun mounts, 4 x twin 20mm gun, 12 - 18 x 20mm single gun mounts.
- Notes: MCV hull type C2-S-B1

The Ormsby-class attack transport was a class of US Navy attack transport that saw service in World War II.

Like all attack transports, the purpose of the Ormsbys was to transport troops and their equipment to hostile shores in order to execute amphibious invasions using an array of smaller assault boats integral to the attack transport itself. Like all the attack transports, the Ormsby class was well armed with antiaircraft weaponry to protect itself and its cargo of troops from air attack in the battle zone.

== History ==
The Ormsby class began as a class of Navy transport ships (classification AP). Like many other transports, they were redesignated attack transports (APA) on 1 February 1943, the date on which the Navy formalized its separate classification of transport vessels into ordinary transports and attack transports.

The three ships of the Ormsby class were based on the Maritime Commission's ubiquitous (328 total) Type C2 merchant/auxiliary hull (specifically, the C2-S-B1 type). This was a pre-war merchant ship hull type which had been specifically designed with prospective Naval auxiliary service in mind.

The three ships of the Ormsby class were laid down in rapid succession in July–August 1942 by the Moore Dry Dock Company of Oakland, California, and commissioned within a month of one another in June–July 1943. The period of time from the laying of the keels to commissioning therefore, was about 12 months for each ship - a fairly average timespan for C-Type vessels converted to warships.

Each of the ships was armed with two 5"/38 caliber dual-purpose guns, two Bofors 40mm guns, and from 16 to 22 20mm guns. The 20mm gun would eventually prove to be of limited use against air attack and later attack transport classes were fitted with more 40mm weapons instead. The ships had a good balance of troop and cargo capacity.

=== In service ===
The Ormsby-class vessels were deployed exclusively in the Pacific Theatre. The ships saw action from the Gilbert Islands campaign to the final battle against the Japanese at Okinawa. Having earned six battle stars apiece, they were employed after hostilities in redeploying occupation troops to the newly conquered Japanese home islands and to other locations formerly occupied by the Japanese, such as parts of China and Korea. They were then used in Operation Magic Carpet, the giant sealift organized to bring demobilizing American servicemen back home to the United States.

All three ships were decommissioned in March–April 1946, and eventually sold or chartered into commercial service. All three were scrapped in 1969, two of them, coincidentally, after suffering accidents that same year. The three vessels in the class thus enjoyed remarkably parallel careers over the course of a service life spanning approximately 26 years.
