= 5-inch/38-caliber gun =

5"/38 caliber gun
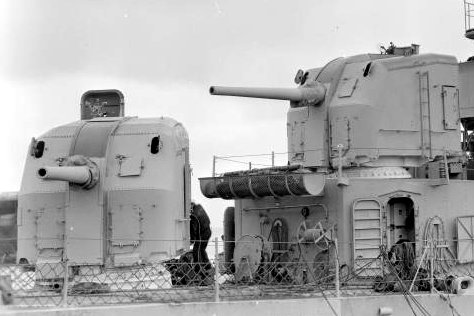
- Two Mk 30 single enclosed base ring mounts on USS David W. Taylor
- Type: Dual Purpose Gun
- Place of origin: United States

Service history
- In service: 1934–2008
- Used by: United States Navy, United States Coast Guard, Royal Navy, Danish Navy, Italian Navy, Japan Maritime Self-Defense Force, South Vietnamese Navy, and every navy that bought surplus World War II, US Navy warships
- Wars: World War II, Korean War, Vietnam War, Gulf War, Falklands War, and wars that involved navies who bought surplus World War II, US Navy warships

Production history
- Designed: 1931–1932

Specifications
- Mass: Mk 12 Gun Assembly: 3,990 lb (1,810 kg). Mounts varied from 29,260 lb (13,270 kg) to 170,653 lb (77,407 kg)
- Length: Mk 12 Gun Assembly: 223.8 in (5.68 m)
- Barrel length: 190 in (4.83 m) bore, 157.2 in (3.99 m) rifling
- Crew: Varied on mount type
- Shell: 127×680mmR; 53 to 55 lb (24 to 25 kg)
- Caliber: 5 in (127 mm)
- Breech: Vertical sliding-wedge
- Recoil: 15 in (38 cm)
- Elevation: −15° to +85°
- Traverse: 328.5 degrees
- Rate of fire: Design: 15 rpm
- Muzzle velocity: 2,600 ft/s (790 m/s) initial
- Sights: Optical telescope

The Mark 12 5"/38-caliber gun was a United States dual-purpose naval gun, but also installed in single-purpose mounts on a handful of ships. The 38-calibers long barrel was a mid-length compromise between the previous United States standard 5-inch/51 low-angle gun and 5-inch/25 anti-aircraft gun. The increased barrel length provided greatly improved performance in both anti-aircraft and anti-surface roles compared to the 5-inch/25 gun. However, except for the barrel length and the use of semi-fixed ammunition, the 5"/38 gun was derived from the 5"/25 gun. Both weapons had power ramming, which enabled rapid fire at high angles against aircraft. The 5"/38 entered service on USS Farragut, commissioned in 1934, the first new destroyer design since the last Clemson was built in 1922. The base ring mount, which improved the effective rate of fire, entered service on USS Porter, commissioned in 1936. (Note: Gridley (June 1937) marks the introduction of the base ring mount in the main line of destroyers. The last 2 Mahan class ships also had them, Dunlap was commissioned in June 1937, too. Porter entered service much sooner)

Among naval historians, the 5"/38 gun is considered the best intermediate-caliber, (Note: a Bore diameter greater than 4 inches (102 mm) and less than 8 inches (203 mm).) dual purpose naval gun of World War II, especially as it was usually under the control of the advanced Mark 37 Gun Fire Control System which provided accurate and timely firing against surface and air targets. Even this advanced system required nearly 1,000 rounds of ammunition expenditure per aircraft kill. However, the planes were normally brought down by shell fragments and not direct hits; barrage fire was used, with many guns firing in the air at the same time. This would result in large walls of shell fragments being put up to take out one or several planes or in anticipation of an unseen plane, this being justifiable as one plane was capable of significant destruction. The comparatively high rate of fire for a gun of its caliber earned it an enviable reputation, particularly as an anti-aircraft weapon, in which role it was commonly employed by United States Navy vessels. Base ring mounts with integral hoists had a nominal rate of fire of 15 rounds per minute per barrel; however, with a well-trained crew, 22 rounds per minute per barrel was possible for short periods. On pedestal and other mounts lacking integral hoists, 12 to 15 rounds per minute was the rate of fire. Useful life expectancy was 4600 effective full charges (EFC) per barrel.

The 5"/38 cal gun was mounted on a very large number of US Navy ships in the World War II era. It was backfitted to many of the World War I-era battleships during their wartime refits, usually replacing 5"/25 guns that were fitted in the 1930s. It has left active US Navy service, but it is still on mothballed ships of the United States Navy reserve fleets. It is also used by a number of nations who bought or were given US Navy surplus ships. Millions of rounds of ammunition were produced for these guns, with over 720,000 rounds still remaining in Navy storage depots in the mid-1980s because of the large number of Reserve Fleet ships with 5"/38 cal guns on board.

== Mark 12 5"/38 cal gun assembly ==
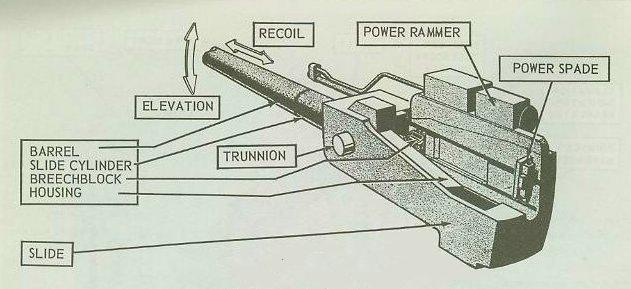
Mk 12 gun assembly

Each mount carries one or two Mk 12 5"/38cal Gun Assemblies. The gun assembly shown is used in single mounts, and it is the right gun in twin mounts. It is loaded from the left side. The left gun in twin mounts is the mirror image of the right gun, and it is loaded from the right side. The Mk 12 gun assembly weighs 3,990 lb (1,810 kg). The Mark 12 Gun Assembly was introduced in 1934, where it was first used in single pedestal mounts on the Farragut-class destroyers, but by the time of World War II they had been installed in single and twin mounts on nearly every major warship and auxiliary in the US fleet.

=== Characteristics ===
The major Mk12 Gun Assembly characteristics are:

Semi-automatic
During recoil, some of the recoil energy is stored in the counter-recoil system. That stored energy is used during counter-recoil to prepare the gun for the next round. The firing pin is cocked, the breech is opened, the spent propellant case is ejected, and the bore is cleared of debris with an air blast.

Hand loaded
A projectile-man and a powder-man are stationed at each gun assembly. Their job is to move the round, consisting of a projectile and a propellant case, from the hoists to the rammer tray projecting from the gun's breech, and then start the ram cycle. The powder case is placed first and the projectile rests against the powder case.

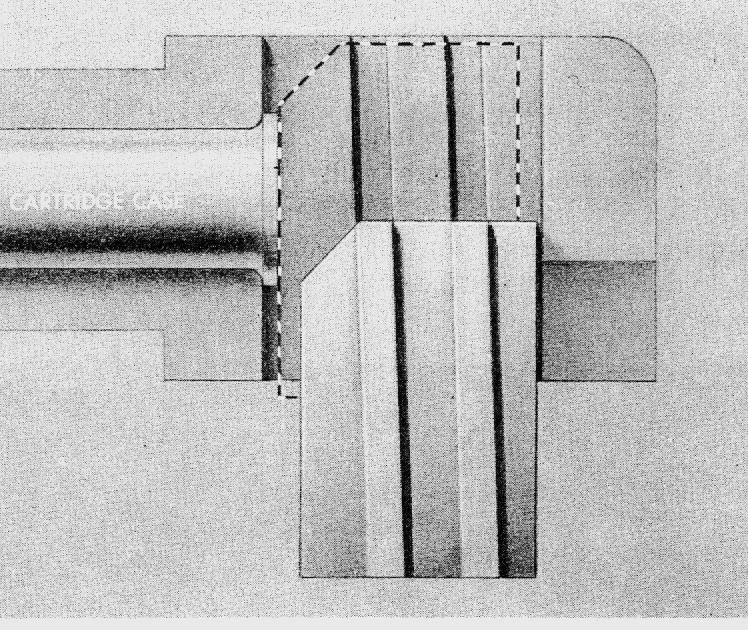
Vertical Sliding Wedge Breech Block.

Power rammed
This gun used a 7.5 hp (5.6 kW) electric-hydraulic power rammer that was designed to ram a 93-pound (42 kg), 47.5 in-long (1.21 m) round (combined weight of projectile and propellant) into the chamber at any gun elevation in less than one second. The rammer's control box, hydraulic fluid tank and AC motor are bolted to the top of the slide (see the Gun Assembly picture above). The hydraulically driven rammer spade, called the power spade in that picture, is at the back of the rammer tray. If the multiple names of the "spade" are confusing, look at this footnote. Hand ramming was also possible in case of power failures with rate of fire approximately cut in half.

Vertical sliding-wedge breech block (see drawing)
The breech block closes the chamber behind the propellant case. It also contains the firing pin assembly.

Hydraulic recoil
Two hydraulic pistons in the housing absorb the major shock of recoil as the housing moves back inside the slide (see picture). They also buffer the end of counter-recoil for a soft return to battery.

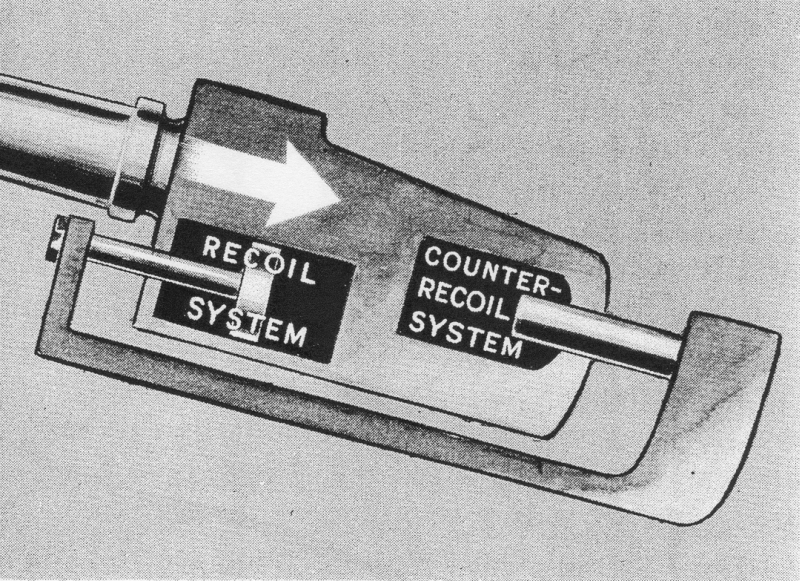
Drawing of the recoil and counter-recoil systems. The arrow shows the motion of the housing in the slide during recoil.

Pneumatic counter-recoil
At the end of recoil, the counter-recoil system moves the housing forward again until it is back "in battery," and holds it there at any gun elevation. A chamber in the housing is filled with compressed air. At the rear of this chamber is a 3.5 in (8.9 cm) cylindrical hole with a chevron packing. Projecting through the hole is a movable piston that abuts the back of the slide (see picture). The air pressure in the chamber attempts to push the piston out of the chamber, but the piston can't move because of the slide. Therefore, since the piston can't go backward, the air pressure in the chamber forces the housing forward. When the gun is in battery, the pressure in this chamber is about 1,500 psi (10 MPa). During recoil, the pressure rises to about 2,250 psi (15.5 MPa).

Barrel designation (5"/38 Caliber)

- 5" is the caliber of this gun. The term "caliber" used here is the artillery caliber definition, and its value is equal to the bore diameter as measured from land to land. Lands are the raised portions of the bore rifling, between the grooves. (note: artillery caliber and small arms caliber are not the same).
- 38 caliber means that the barrel from breech face to muzzle is 38 calibers in length. As this gun's caliber is 5 inches (127mm), its barrel length is 38 times 5 inches: 190 inches (480 cm; 16 ft).

Barrel description

- Radially expanded monobloc steel alloy.
- Weight: 2,000 pounds (910 kilograms)
- The bore is chrome plated from the origin of rifling (forward end of the chamber) to the muzzle.
- 45 groove rifling with a full uniform right hand twist in 30 Calibers (150 inches (380 centimetres)).
- Maximum bore pressure of a new gun firing an anti-aircraft common projectile: 40,320 pounds per square inch (278,000 kilopascals).
- Barrel connected to the housing with a bayonet joint that allowed for its replacement by destroyer tenders in the theater of operation, without dismantling the breech mechanism or other parts.

Ballistics
Maximum horizontal range with a 55-pound (25 kg) projectile is 18,000 yards (16,000 m). In the anti-aircraft role, the gun has a ceiling of 37,200 feet (11,300 m) at 85 degrees elevation.

Armor penetration with 54-pound (24 kg) special common shell
5.0" (127 mm) belt armor at 4,000 yards (3,700 m)
4.0" (102 mm) at 5,400 yards (4,900 m)
3.0" (76 mm) at 7,400 yards (6,800 m)
2.0" (51 mm) at 11,000 yards (10,000 m)
1.0" (25 mm) deck armor at 13,800 yards (12,600 m)
with 55.18 pounds (25.03 kg) AA common shell: 1.5 inches (38 mm) at 10,000 yards (9,100 m)

Range with 55.18-pound (25.03 kg) AAC Mark 49 (792 mps)
10° 9,506 yards (8,692 m)
15° 11,663 yards (10,665 m)
20° 13,395 yards (12,248 m)
25° 14,804 yards (13,537 m)
30° 15,919 yards (14,556 m)
35° 16,739 yards (15,306 m)
40° 17,240 yards (15,760 m)
45° 17,392 yards (15,903 m)
AA Ceiling 37,200 feet (11,300 m)

The new gun initial muzzle velocity is 2,600 feet per second (790 metres per second), and the gun life average initial muzzle velocity is about 2,500 feet per second (760 metres per second).

US ships during World War II carried only small quantities of special common ammunition, as the anti-aircraft common was considered more useful, even if it meant achieving much less armor penetration. Bursting charges were 7.25 pounds (3.29 kg) explosive D composition A, the special common had only 0.9-1.2 kg due to its thicker walls (AP).

=== Loading ===
At the "LOAD" command, or if the mount is executing "RAPID" loading: (NOTE: Rapid loading means that, when the gun fires, the gun crew immediately reloads the gun without command until "CEASE FIRE" or "CHECK FIRE" is given.)

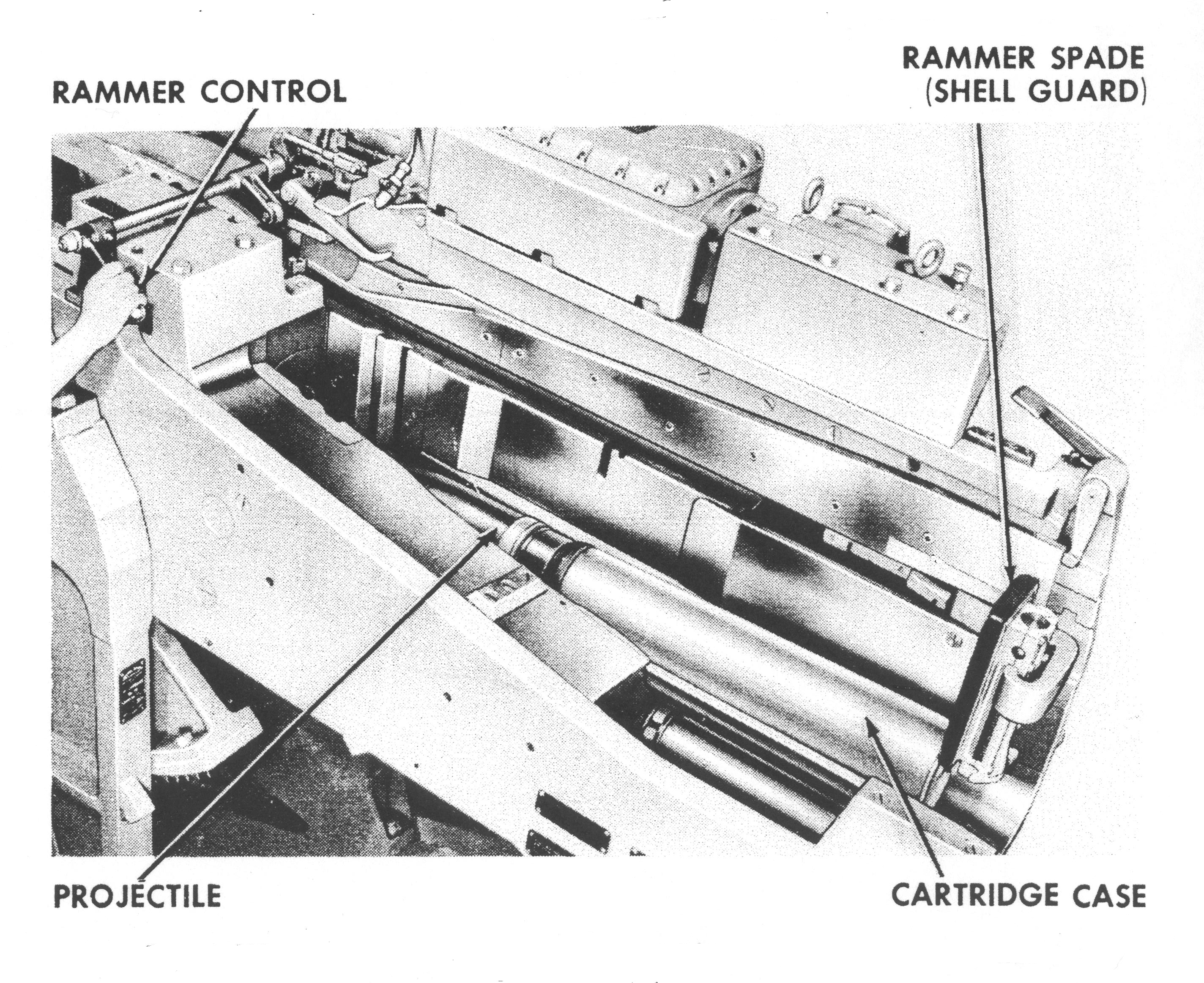
Rammer Tray with Powder Case and Projectile ready for ramming.

The Powder-Man:

1. Verifies that the RAMMER SPADE is at the rear of the "Rammer Tray" (see picture)
2. Slips the "Butterfly" primer protector off the base of the powder case that is sticking knee high out of powder hoist on the deck.
3. Throws the protector out of the mount.
4. Pulls the powder case out of the hoist, and lifts it into the rammer tray.
5. Verifies that the case is back against the rammer spade.
6. Clears his arms from the tray.

The Projectile-Man:

1. Verifies that the powder case is in the rammer tray.
2. Pulls the projectile out of the waist high projectile hoist.
3. Places projectile in front of the powder case in the tray.
4. Clears his arms from the tray.
5. Pulls down on the RAMMER CONTROL (see RAMMER CONTROL at the upper left corner of picture).

Rammer Load Cycle:

1. Pulling down on the Rammer Control lever opens hydraulic valves inside the Rammer Controller.
2. The opened valves port high pressure hydraulic fluid to the "Hydraulic Ram Cylinder" in the Slide behind the tray. The Ram Cylinder is connected to the "Rammer Cross Head". (The white horizontal bar behind the Spade in the picture.) The Cross Head supports the Rammer Spade as it moves in the tray. When the cylinder is pressurized, the Cross Head and Spade are driven forward in the Tray.
3. As the spade moves forward, it pushes the projectile and powder case into the chamber. The spade's time of travel, from the rear of the tray to the breech, is one second. As it approaches the breech, the Cross Head pushes through a spring latch that locks it there. At the same time, the Cross Head trips another lever connected to the Rammer Controller, and the Controller releases the hydraulic pressure to the Ram Cylinder.
4. When the powder case clears the top of the breech block, the block automatically rises.
5. The rising breech block displaces the rammer spade behind the powder case by pushing the spring-loaded spade up. This continues until the rammer spade is off the powder case, and the block has sealed the chamber.
6. The gun is loaded and ready to fire.

=== Firing ===
This gun can be fired either electrically or by percussion.

When the gun fires, the following automatic events happen in two seconds:

1. During Recoil:
  1. The Rammer Crosshead is unlocked.
  2. The Rammer Control is pushed to the up position by a cam on top of the rearward moving Housing.
  3. With the Rammer Control up, the Rammer Controller ports high pressure hydraulic fluid to the retract side of the Rammer Cylinder, and the Rammer Crosshead and Spade drive back to the rear of the Rammer Tray.
2. During Counter-recoil:
  1. The Firing Pin is cocked.
  2. The Breech Block is lowered.
  3. The spent Powder Case is ejected out of the Chamber, and back down the Rammer Tray. There it is caught by the gloved Hot Case Man, and thrown out of the mount.
  4. Just before the housing finishes returning to "In Battery", a valve is opened for a second, and a blast of compressed air is sent down the bore to clean it out.

The gun is ready to be reloaded.

== Gun mounts ==
=== Types ===
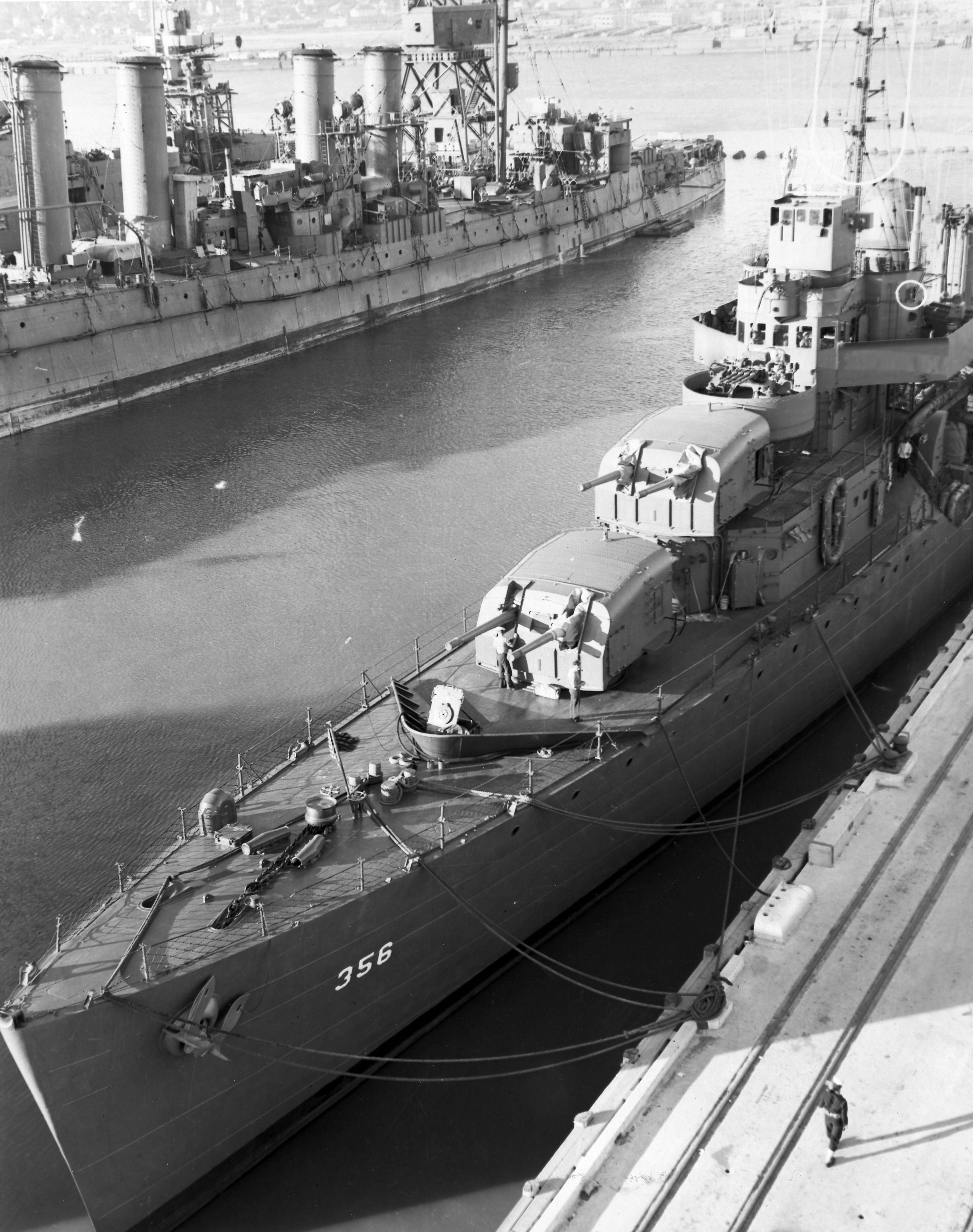
Two Mk 22 5"/38 caliber mounts aboard the destroyer USS Porter, 1942.

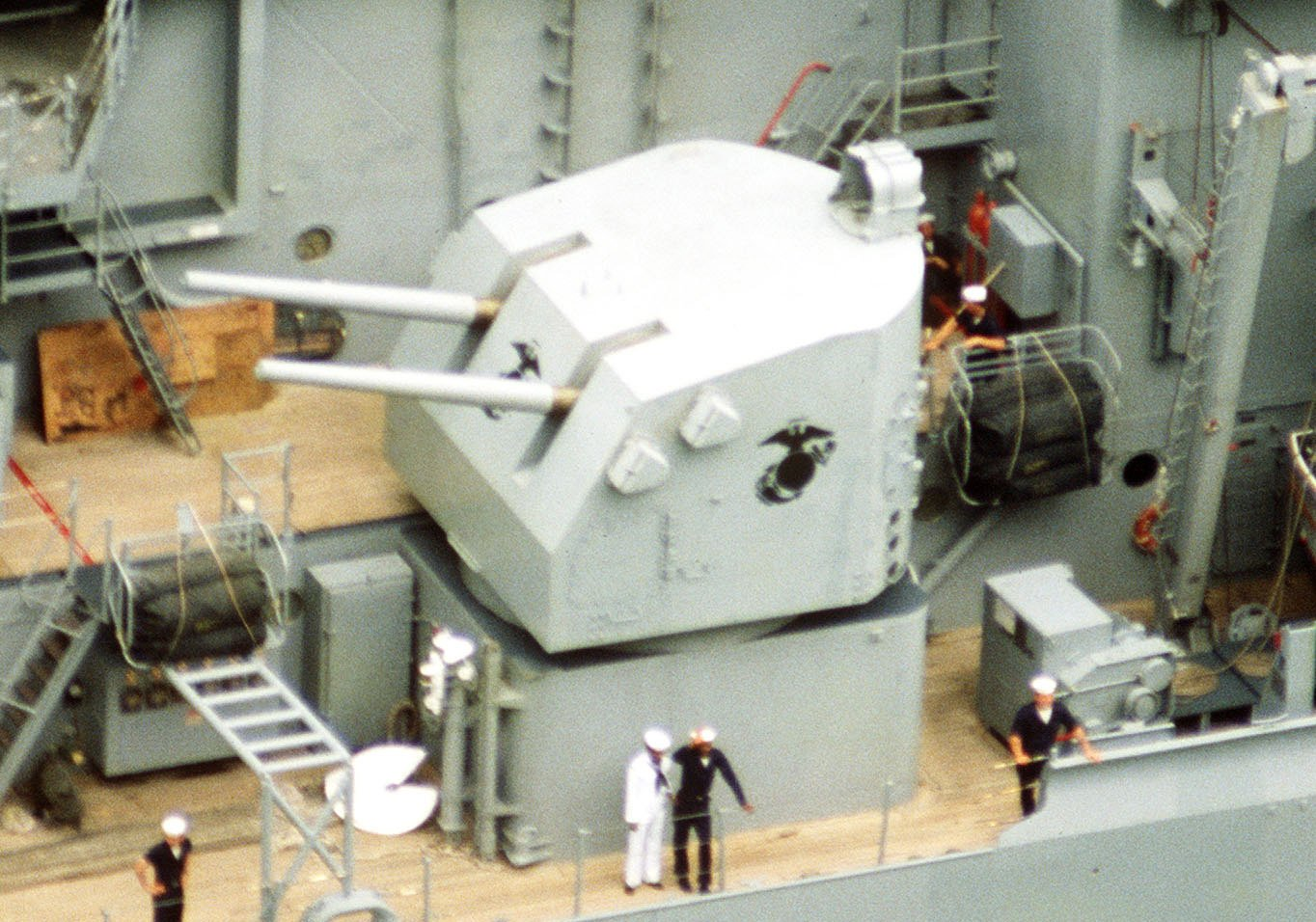
USMC crewed Mk 28 Mod 2 5"/38 caliber mount aboard USS New Jersey, 1984.

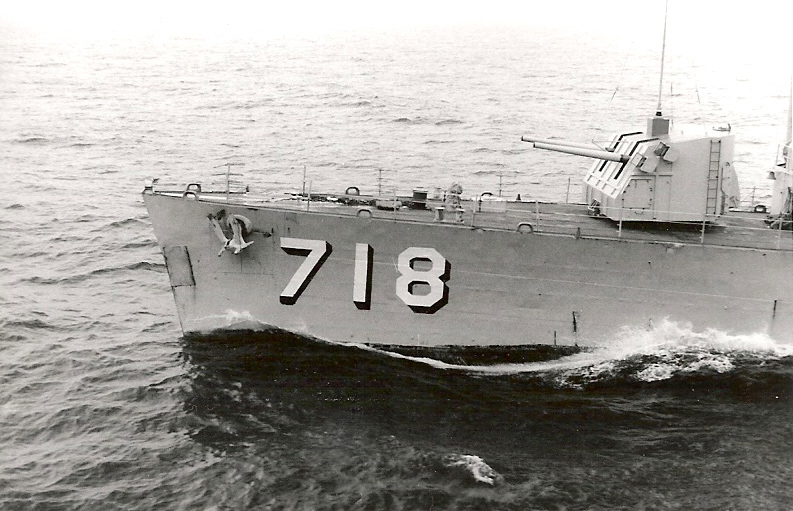
Forward Mk 38 5"/38 caliber mount aboard the destroyer USS Hamner.

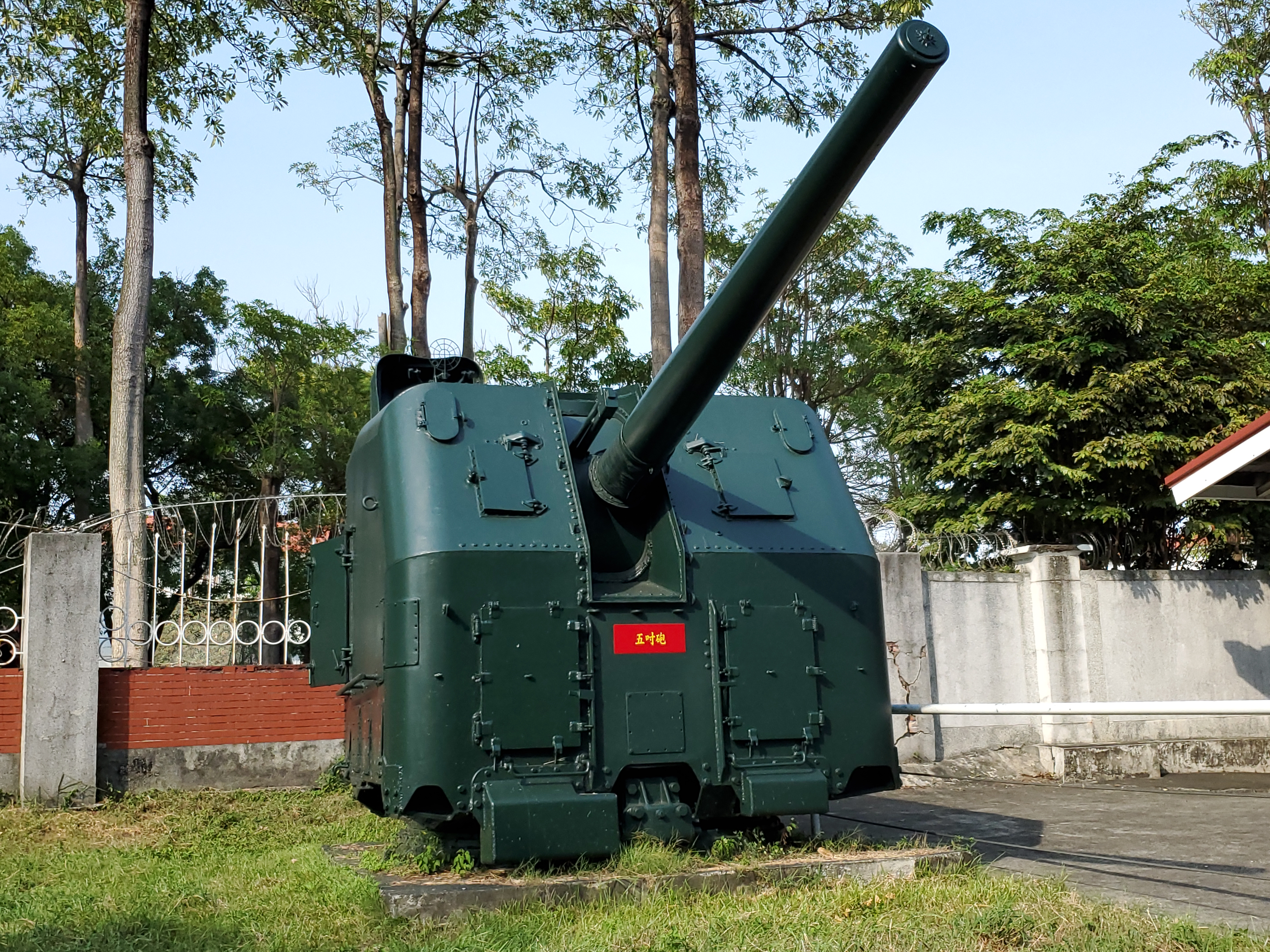
The World War II Naval 5"/38 gun preserved in the ROC Marine Corps History Museum in Zuoying, Kaohsiung, Taiwan.

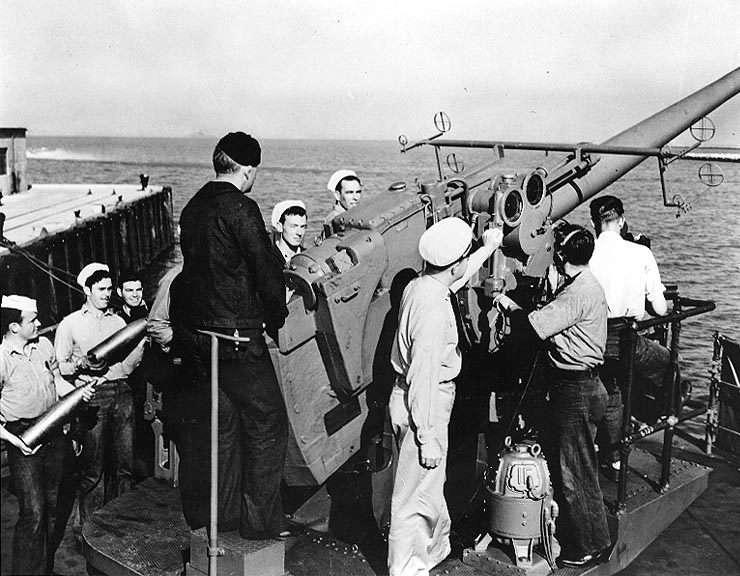
A Mk 21 5"/38 caliber open pedestal mount in 1942 - USS Shaw (DD-373).

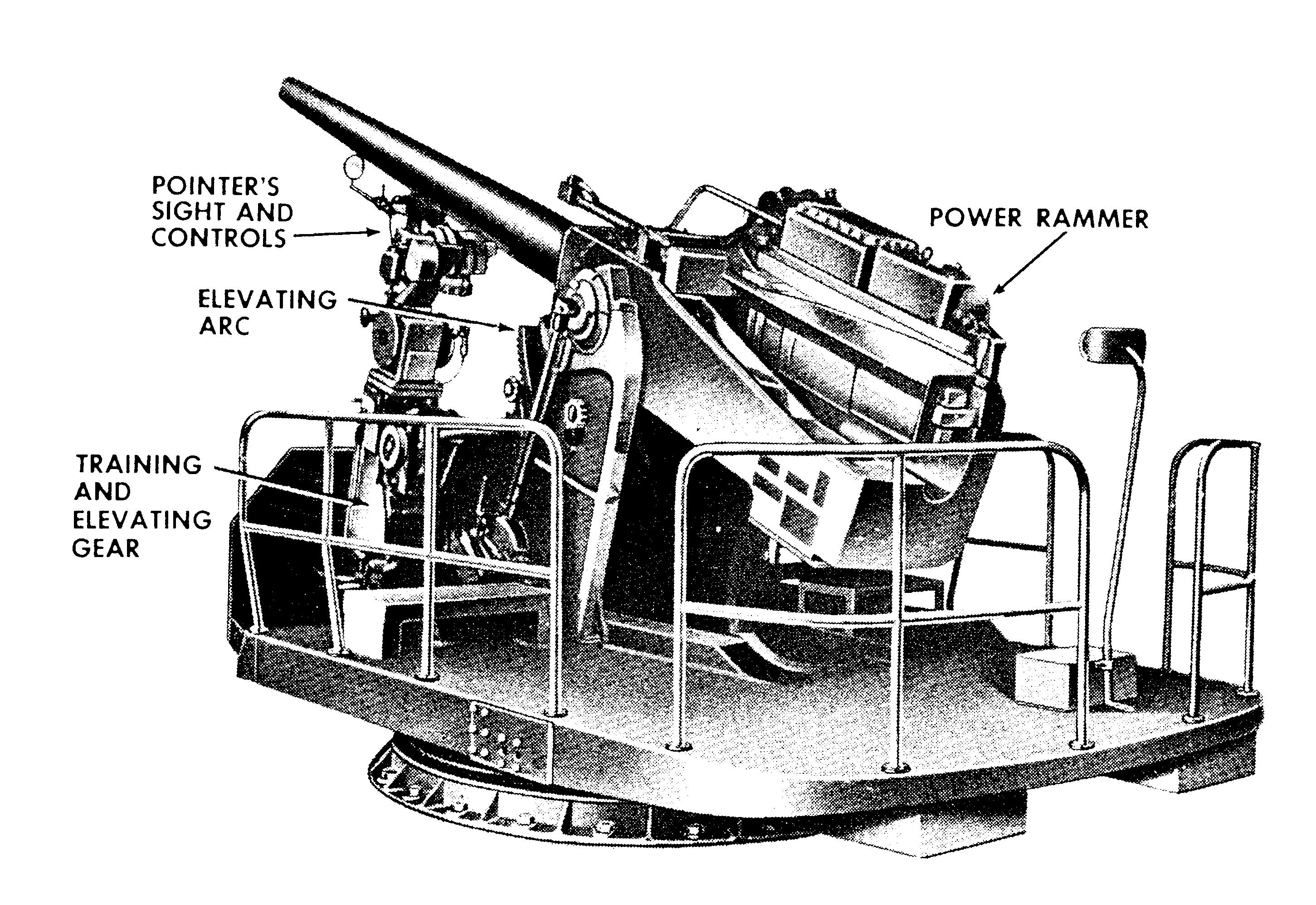
Left rear view of a Mark 37 5"/38 caliber mount. NOTE: No Fuze Setter.

There are four basic mount types:

Twin

- All sat on a base ring stand, and had an ammunition handling room, called the Upper Handling Room (as it was above the main magazine), below the mount.
- They all had:
  - Horizontal periscopic sights with movable-prism sight setting.
  - Two powered, fuze setting, projectile hoists.
  - Two powered powder case hoists.
  - Powered training and elevating drives (in this context, "training" means rotating the mount on its stand).
- This mount was the standard installation on battleships, cruisers, early destroyer leader (Porter, Somers) classes (these mounts on the DLs were single-purpose/anti-surface ship only), and later destroyers (starting with the Allen M. Sumner class). It was also used on the island (starboard) side of the Essex-class aircraft carriers.

Enclosed single
All enclosed single mounts sat on a base ring stand, and had an upper handling room. The enclosed single mount was used on some early destroyer classes (Gridley (1937) up to and including the Fletcher class (1942)), but by the end of World War II, it was mainly found on the many minelayers and auxiliaries which were developed from the older classes of destroyers, as well as on most of the destroyer escorts, and many large auxiliaries (repair ships, destroyer tenders, etc.).

Open single base ring mount
Open mount with Upper-Handling Room. Used on the port and starboard gangways, just below the flight deck, on Yorktown-class aircraft carriers and Benham through Gleaves-class destroyers.

Open single pedestal mount
This was the first 5"/38cal type installed. It was put on the Farragut-class destroyers in 1934 through to the Bagley class (1937). Some of these mounts placed on ship's forecastles were partially enclosed to protect the crew against bow spray, but they were still considered an open mount. Since these mounts did not have Upper Handling Rooms, they could be installed on ships without extensive reconstruction. For that reason, they were frequently used on armed merchant ships.

Farragut and Mahan had only open mounts. The Gridley class introduced the enclosed single gun house, but not all of its guns were enclosed. The Benham class replaced all pedestal mounts with open base ring mounts later on. The Fletcher class was the first to only have enclosed guns (except for the Porter and Somers destroyer leaders).

There are several models of the 5"/38, differentiated by the word Mark (or its abbreviation Mk) and a number. Variations to the basic design are called Modifications (or its abbreviation Mod). For instance, 5"/38 Mk 21 is a single-barrel open pedestal mount widely used on amphibious ships, auxiliaries, and merchant ships. The 5"/38 Mk 30 is a single enclosed base ring mount widely used on destroyer escorts. The 5"/38 Mk 38 is a twin mount specifically designed for newer destroyers.

5"/38-caliber gun mounts
Mark/mod	Barrels	Weight	Design	Use
Mk 21	Single	31,200 lb (14,200 kg)	Open pedestal	Some 1930s built combatants, auxiliaries, merchant ships: destroyers; 8 Farragut-class(1932) (5x1); 16 Mahan-class(1934) (5x1)
Mk 22	Twin	75,250 lb (34,130 kg)	Enclosed base ring	destroyer leaders; 8 Porter-class(1933) (4x2); 5 Somers-class(1935) (4x2)
Mk 24	Single	29,260 lb (13,270 kg)	Open pedestal	1930s built aircraft carriers: destroyers; 4 Gridley-class(1935) (aft 2x1); 8 Bagley-class(1935) (aft 2x1); 2 Mahan-class(1936) (aft 3x1); cruisers; Wichita (4/8)
Mk 28 MOD 0	Twin	156,295 lb (70,894 kg)	Enclosed base ring	Pre-Iowa-class battleships
Mk 28 MOD 2	Twin	170,635 lb (77,399 kg)	Enclosed base ring	Iowa-class battleships
Mk 29 MOD 0	Twin	108,000 lb (49,000 kg)	Enclosed base ring	Cruisers, Atlanta-class light cruisers
Mk 30 MOD 0	Single	40,900 lb (18,600 kg)	Enclosed base ring	Destroyers, auxiliaries, USCG high endurance cutters: cruisers; Wichita (4/8)
Mk 30 MOD 1	Single	33,500 lb (15,200 kg)	Open base ring	Destroyer rear mounts, escort carriers: 10 Benham-class(1935) (aft 2x1); 12 Sims-class(1937) (aft 2x1 out of 3x1); 30 Benson-class(1938) (aft 2x1 out of 3x1); 66 Gleaves-class(1938) (aft 2x1 out of 3x1)
Mk 30 MOD 69	Single	45,000 lb (20,000 kg)	Enclosed base ring	Destroyer escorts with the upper rear edge of the Mark 38 blast shield beveled to clear hedgehog projectiles from a launcher astern of the gun mount
Mk 32 MOD 0	Twin	105,600 lb (47,900 kg)	Enclosed base ring	Cruisers, aircraft carriers
Mk 32 MOD 4	Twin	120,369 lb (54,598 kg)	Enclosed base ring	Cruisers, aircraft carriers
Mk 37 MOD 0	Single	34,700 lb (15,700 kg)	Open pedestal	Armed merchants, auxiliaries
Mk 38 MOD 0	Twin	95,700 lb (43,400 kg)	Enclosed base ring	Destroyers

=== Ammunition delivery ===
Since this gun fires semi-fixed ammunition, each round is delivered to the gun in two pieces—a projectile and a powder case.

Base ring mounts
The ready service ammunition is kept in the upper handling room just below the mount. The projectile travels up to the gun room (also called the gun house) through an electric-hydraulic hoist. It arrives next to the projectile-man nose down and waist high. If the projectile has a time fuze, the fuze is automatically set as it goes up the hoist, and the hoist maintains the ordered fuze setting from the fire control system as long as the projectile stays in the hoist. The powder case is sent up through a powder scuttle in the gun room's deck just next to the powder man's feet. It arrives with its base up, and the primer covered with a protector called the "Butterfly". The men in the upper handling room hand carry the projectiles and powder cases from the ready service racks to the lower ends of the hoists while avoiding the equipment hanging down from the rotating mount. In a twin mount executing "Rapid continuous fire" (the firing keys are held closed, and the gun fires as soon as the breech closes), the crew move 30 to 44 projectiles and powder cases per minute.

Pedestal mounts
The ready service ammunition is kept in lockers or compartments arrayed around the mount. The projectiles and powder cases are hand carried from ready service to the left side of the moving mount. The projectile is placed nose down in one of three Fuze Setter Mechanisms (commonly called fuze pots) on the mount. If the man is delivering a projectile with a mechanical time fuze, he then spins a hand crank just in front of that fuze setter mechanism. This would dial in the ordered fuze time into that projectile. The powder case is placed in a rack bolted to the mount's deck just behind the powder-man's feet.

=== Mount crew ===
Depending on the mount, a 5"/38-caliber gun could have a crew of 15 to 27 personnel in the gun room and upper handling room. This does not include the personnel needed in the magazines during extended actions. There were two modes of mount operation that the crew was trained and expected to know. The primary mode was "automatic control", where the mount was slaved to the fire control system. But if the fire control system was damaged, or if the ship's power was out, the mount could continue the action in "local control". In US service, most gun crews were US Navy personnel. Even the civilian Merchant Marine ships had a small detachment of the Navy Armed Guard on board to operate the 5"/38 and other guns. One exception to this was on ships with a Marine Detachment, where the Marines manned one of the mounts, usually decorated with the Marine emblem (see the USMC emblem on USS New Jersey's Mk 28, MOD 2 mount picture above).

Mount captain
A senior Petty Officer or Gunnery Sergeant who was in command of the mount. In enclosed mounts, he stood on an interior platform that was located half way up the back bulkhead of the enclosure. There was a hatch on the top of the enclosure where he could stick his head and shoulders out the mount's top. On some mounts, this hatch had a steel hood welded around the back and sides (see an example of this hood in the USS New Jersey picture). This hood protected the Mount Captain from the muzzle blasts of adjacent weapons. He was wearing a sound powered telephone so that he could receive action orders from the battery commander, and send mount status reports back. Covering the telephone headset, there was a helmet specially designed to fit over the phone. Around his neck, he had a pair of gunnery binoculars which had a reticle scaled in angular mils. By ducking his head down into the mount, he could see the entire interior of the mount from his platform. Next to him was a voice tube down to the upper handling room. At arms length, he had switches for controlling communication, emergency lighting, and battle lanterns. His duties during Automatic Control were to receive action orders from the battery commander (e.g., "Mount 51, plot. Surface action starboard. Target destroyer. Bearing 060. Range nine thousand, five hundred yards. Slow salvo."), give the appropriate orders to his Gun Room and Upper Handling Room crews (e.g., "Match pointers. Switch to automatic. Handling room fill the hoists with able able common and full service charge. Standby for slow salvo."), verify that his orders were being followed, and report his gun's status back to the battery commander (e.g., "Plot, mount 51 in auto. Bore clear."). In Local Control, he aimed and fired his mount's gun(s)—sometimes without external help. With his gunnery binoculars, he estimated the range to the target, and its bearing rate. He then mentally converted these into range and deflection orders to his Sight Setter. After firing, he observed the fall of his shot, and made sight corrections to his Sight Setter if necessary.

Gun Captain
The Gunner's Mate(s) responsible for maintaining the mount. Daily, he went through a process of checking fluid levels, lubricating bearings, cleaning gun sights, cycling powered equipment, testing firing systems, checking gas pressures, and verifying that all the equipment that would be needed in an action was in his mount. In twin mounts, there would be a gun captain assigned to each gun assembly. The gun captain usually stood on his foot-high tool box that was welded to the mount's deck, and offset from the gun's centerline (see the man in black standing on the box in the Mk 21 open mount picture). This placed him high and aft of the rammer motor. From there, he could watch the actions of the powder-man, projectile-man, breech block, and rammer. He could verify that the gun returned to battery before the next round was loaded. If something went wrong, he was free to move around his gun to fix the problem. He knew everyone's job, and could step in if necessary. At the mount captain's command, he manually opened the breech block before the first round was loaded, and reported if the bore is clear. His duties were the same in automatic or local control.

Pointer

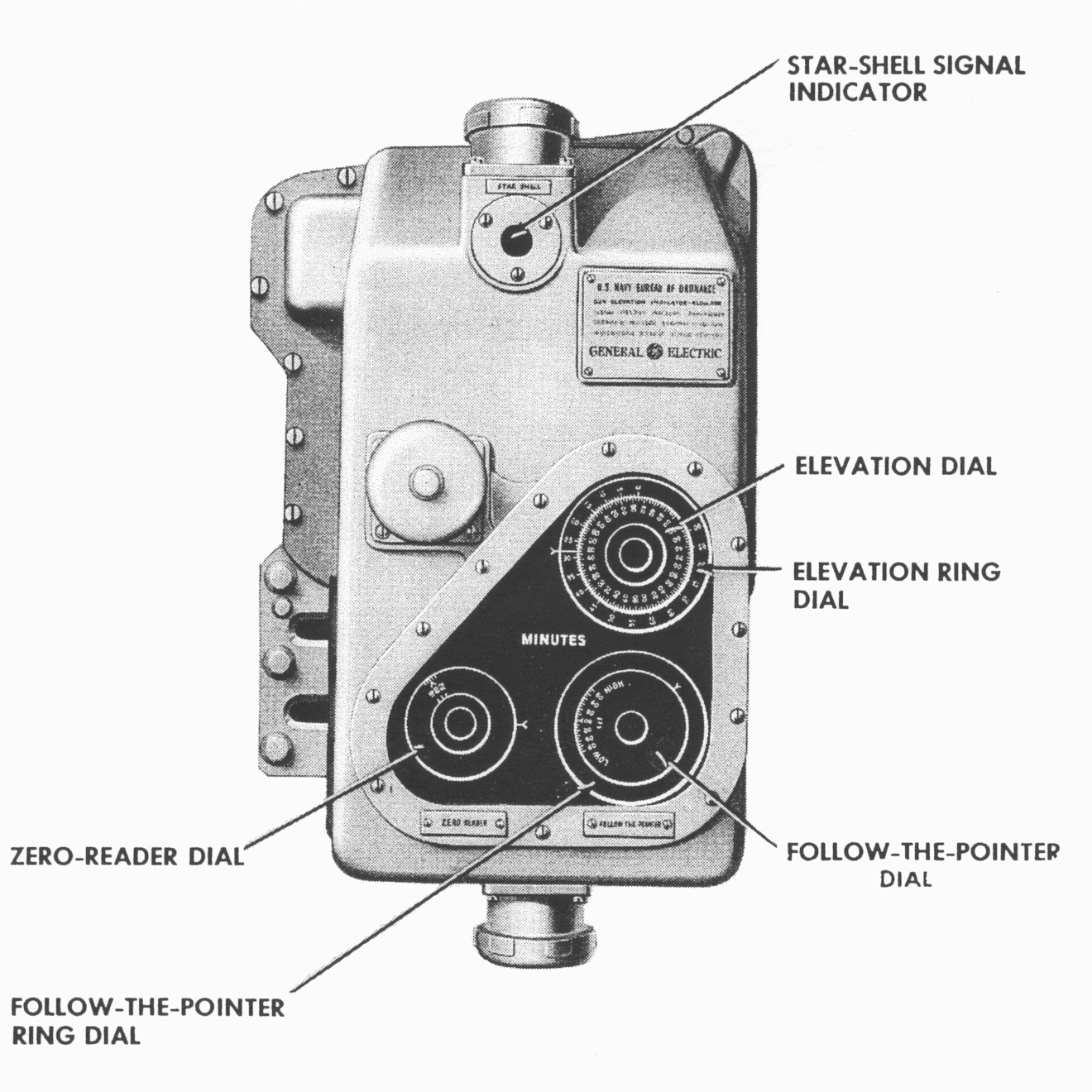
Single Mount Elevation Indicator Regulator

Controlled the mount's elevation and firing. He sat in the left front corner of the mount. In front of him were his optical sight, hand wheels, and elevation drive controls. To his right, about elbow high, was a large box called the Elevation Indicator Regulator (pictured). This box controlled the elevation power drive. Through a window on top of the box, he could see a set of dials that indicated the elevation of the gun, and the automatic elevation orders coming from the Fire Control System. Above the Indicator Regulator was the Electrical Fire Select Switch. It was a rotary switch with three positions: Off, Local, and Auto. Off disabled the electrical firing system on the mount. Local enabled the electric firing key on his right hand wheel. Auto enabled the off-mount electrical firing circuit from the Fire Control System. Just outside his right knee was the Percussion Select Lever. This mechanical lever had two positions: Safe, and Armed. When it was in the armed position, the mechanical linkage for percussion firing was enabled. His right footrest was at one end of this linkage, and the firing pin sear in the breech block was at the other. By rocking his right foot forward, he fired the gun. Electrical firing was the primary firing method. When the Mount Captain commanded "Match pointers. Switch to Automatic," he looked down at the dials on his Indicator-Regulator. The dials told him the difference between the gun's present elevation and the ordered elevation electrically coming from the Fire Control System by synchro. He changed the elevation of the gun, by moving his hand wheels, until the dial difference was zero. His dials were now "matched", and he switched the elevation drive into Auto. This disengaged his hand wheels, and gave elevation control to the Fire Control System. Then he moved the Electrical Fire Select Switch to "AUTO", and reported back to the Mount Captain, "Elevation in auto." He would now look through his sight, and if the Sight Setter had matched the sight-setter dial pointers, he would see the target in the cross-hairs. When the Mount Captain commanded "Switch to Local", he switched the elevation drive and the Electrical Fire Select Switch to local. In local control, he controlled the gun's elevation with his hand wheels to keep his sight's horizontal cross hair on the target. At the command of the Mount Captain, he fired the gun by squeezing the firing key on his right hand wheel.

Trainer

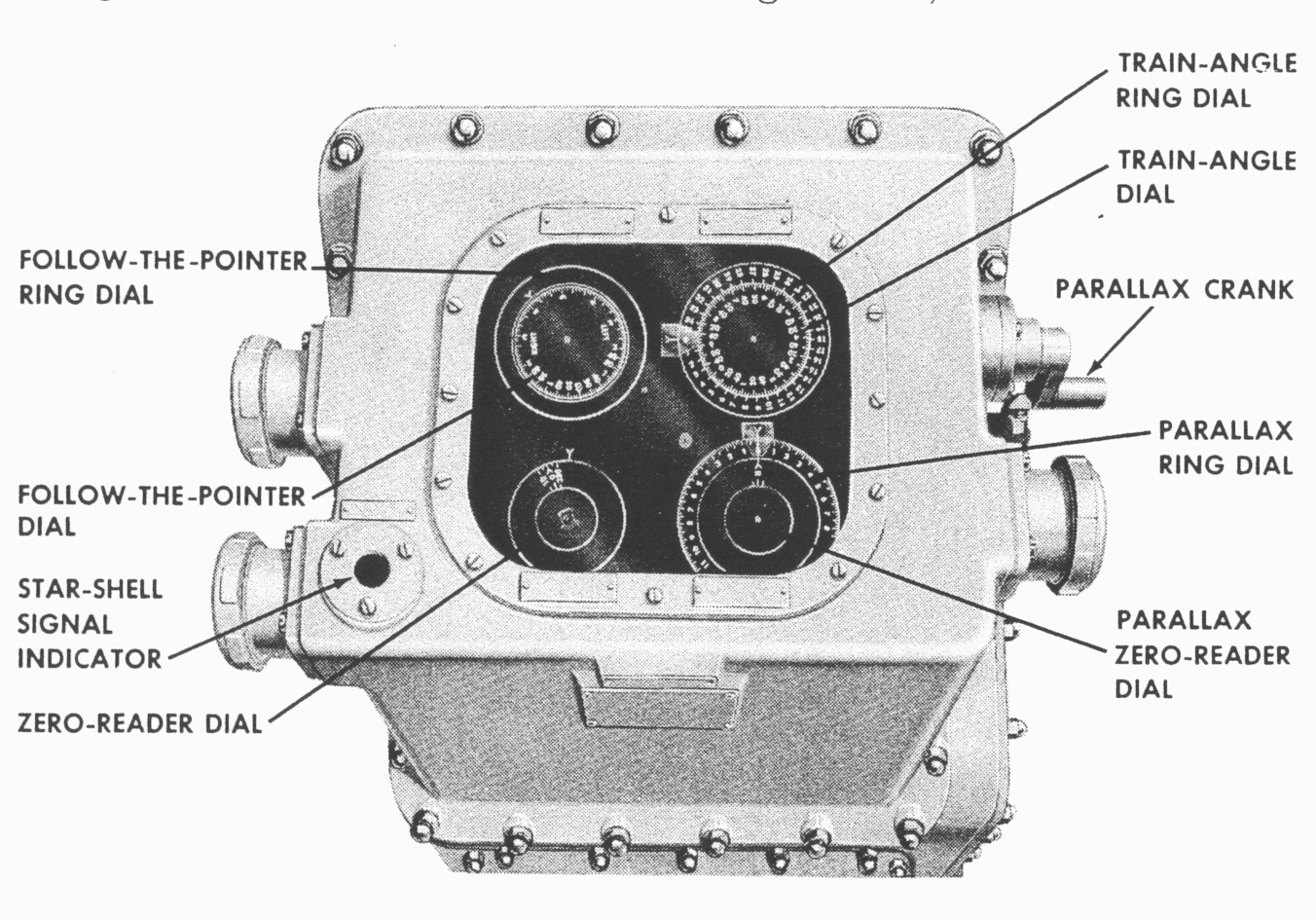
Single Mount Train Indicator Regulator

Controls the mount's train angle (bearing). He sits in the right front corner of the mount (see the far right man in the Mk 21 open mount picture). In front of him, are his optical sight, hand wheels, and train drive controls. Between his knees is a large box called the Train Indicator Regulator. (pictured) This box controls the train power drive. On top of the box, is a window with a set of dials that indicate the train angle of the gun, and the automatic train orders electrically coming from the Fire Control System by synchro. When the Mount Captain commands, "Match pointers. Switch to Automatic.", he looks down at the dials on his Indicator-Regulator. The dials also tell him the difference between the gun's present train angle and the ordered train angle. He changes the bearing of the gun, by moving his hand wheels, until the dial difference is zero. His dials are now "matched", and he switches the train drive into Auto. This disengages his hand wheels, and gives train angle control to the Fire Control System. Then, he reports back to the Mount Captain, "Train in auto." He may now look through his sight, and if the Sight Setter has matched the sight-setter dial pointers, he will see the target in the cross-hairs. When the Mount Captain commands, "Switch to Local", he switches the train drive to local. In local control, he controls the gun's train angle with his hand wheels to keep his sight's vertical cross hair on the target.

Sight setter

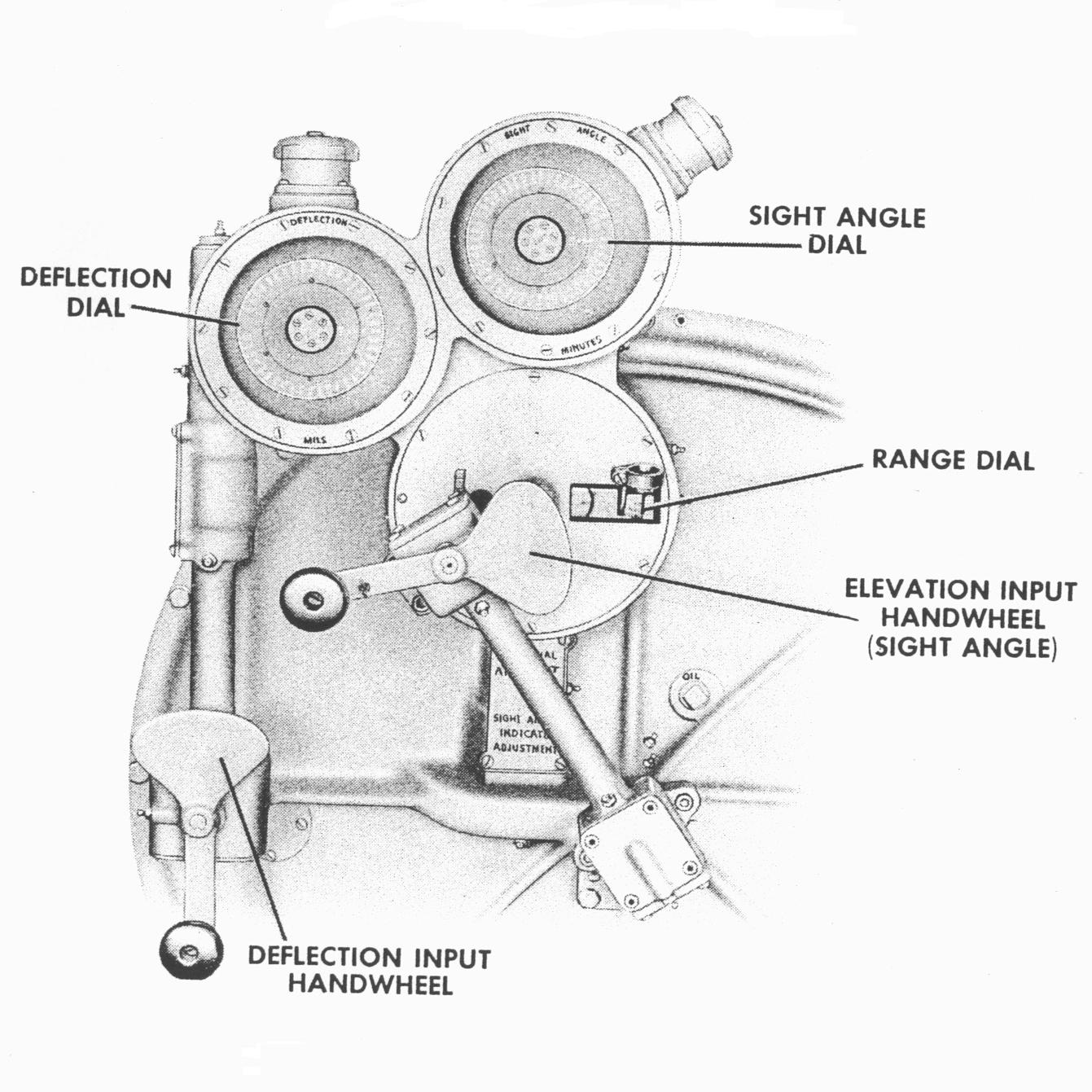
Single Mount Sight Setter Dials

Operates the sight setting equipment. In single mounts, he stands just behind the trainer (see the man with headphones in the Mk 21 open mount picture), while in twin mounts he sits between the guns, just forward of the projectile hoists. The sight setter moves the sights' reticles relative to the barrel's axis. In early open mounts, this was done by moving the platforms to which the sights were bolted. Sights in enclosed mounts have movable prisms in their optical paths. The sight setter has three dials, and two hand cranks. (pictured) The two right dials and right hand crank control the elevation reticle offset (called Sight Angle). The upper right dial is scaled in minutes of arc, and the lower right dial is in yards. The left dial and hand crank control the reticle's left and right offset (called Sight Deflection), and the dial is scaled in angular mils. When the mount is in Automatic Control, he turns his hand cranks to keep index marks on his dials matched to lines on the central disks of the dials. These disks are electrically controlled by the Fire Control System by synchro. This is called matching the pointers, and it allows the sights to remain on the target while the mount is controlled by the Fire Control System. In local control, he takes sighting orders from the Mount Captain in yards of range and mils of deflection.

Fuze setter

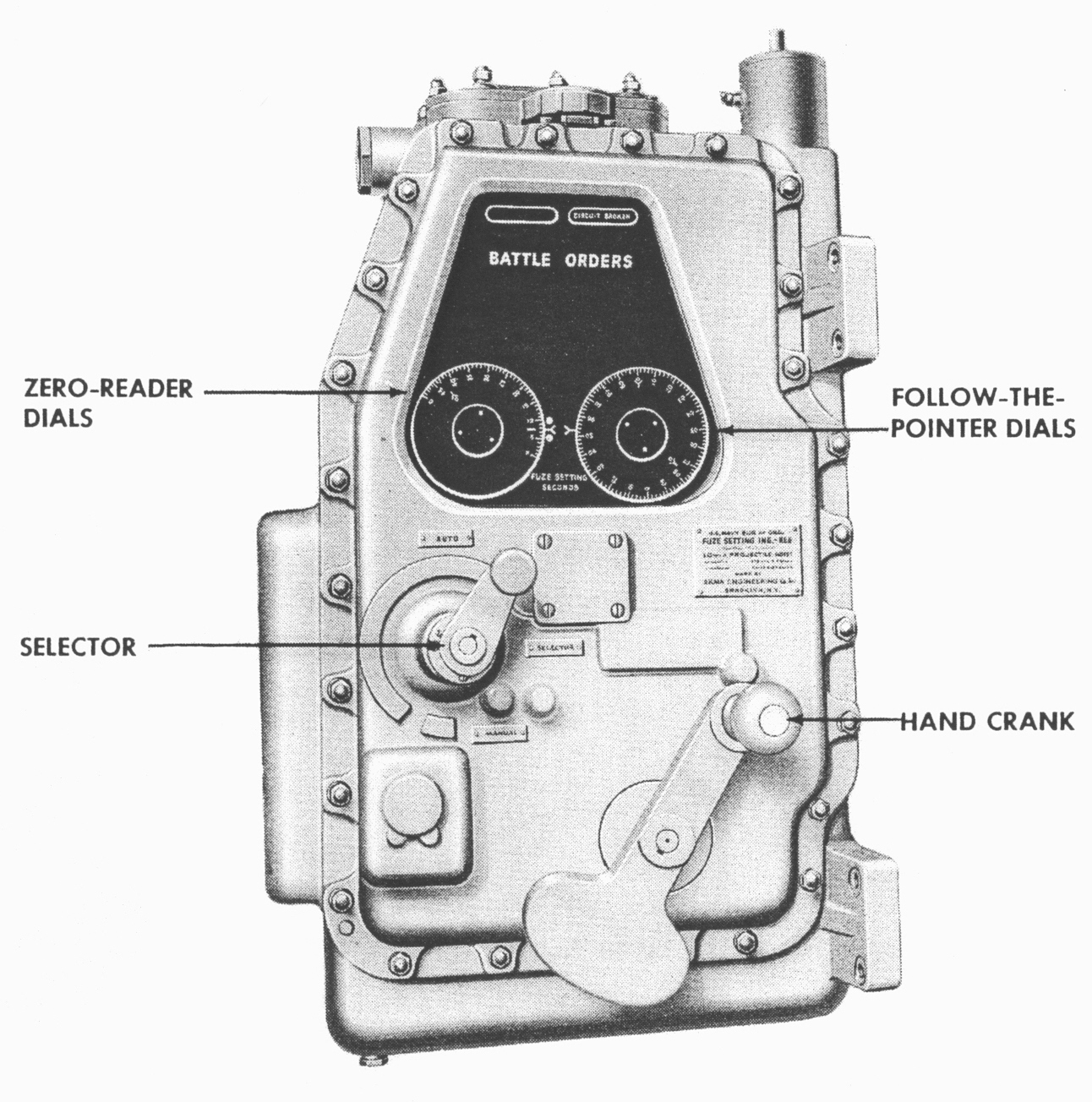
Single Mount Fuze-setting Indicator Regulator

He operates the equipment which sets the fuze time on projectiles with mechanical time fuzes. On a single enclosed mount, he sits below and just outboard of the Pointer's seat. Under the Pointer's seat, and in front the Fuse Setter, is the Fuse Indicator Regulator. (pictured) It is a box with a window, a hand crank, and a selector lever. On a twin mount, he and his Fuze Indicator Regulator sit next to the Sight Setter between the guns. When the mount is put in Automatic control, he flips the selector lever to Auto, and this electrically powered Fuze Indicator Regulator automatically follows the fuze setting orders sent from the Fire Control System by synchro. In Local Control, he follows the Mount Captain's fuze orders by spinning the hand crank until the dials in the window read the correct fuze time.

Powder-man
Slides the primer protector off the powder case, and then lifts the case from the powder scuttle at his feet to the gun's rammer tray.

Projectile-man
Moves the projectile from the hoist to the rammer tray in front of the just-placed powder case, and then he pulls the rammer lever to load the projectile and powder case into the chamber.

Hot case man
When the gun fires, he catches the ejected powder case and throws it out of the mount.

Check sight
He verifies that the mount is aiming at the target.

== Ammunition ==
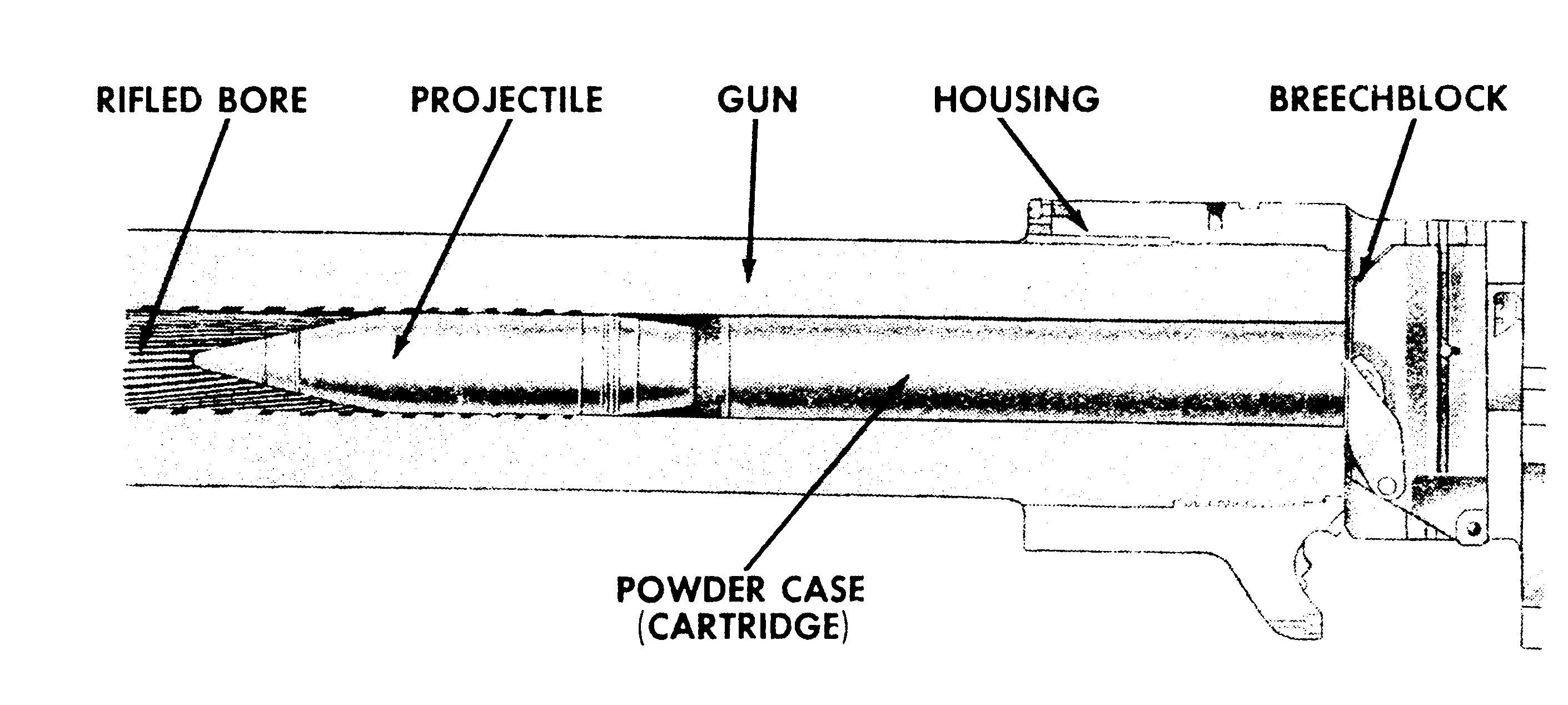
Drawing of loaded Semi-Fixed round.

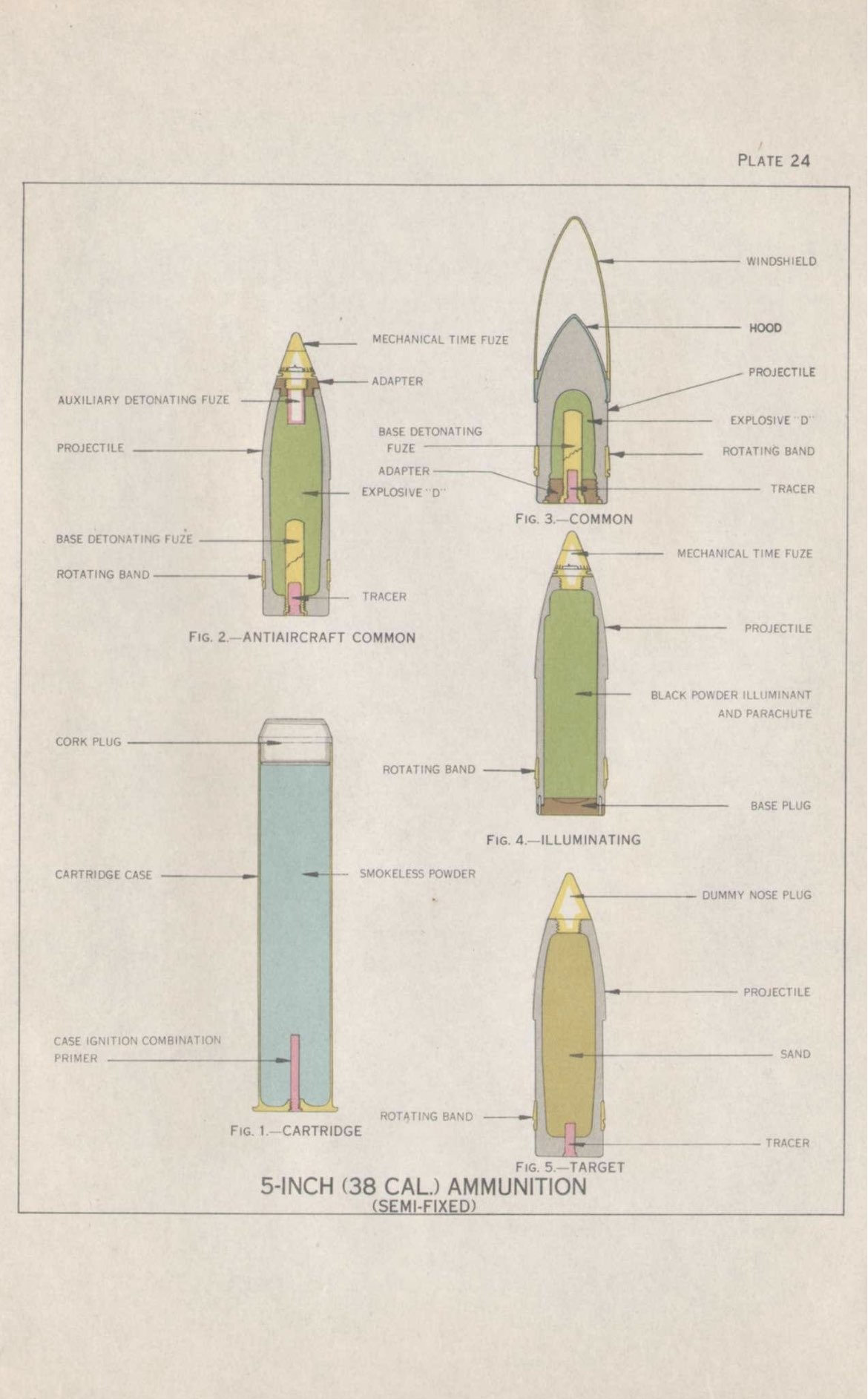
5-inch (38 Cal.) Ammunition (Semi-Fixed)

This gun uses semi-fixed ammunition. (Also called Separated Ammunition.) Each round consists of a projectile and a powder case. The two parts of the round are kept separate until they get to the gun. At the gun, they are first combined on the rammer tray, and then power rammed into the chamber together with one ram cycle. The powder case completely fills the volume of the chamber, and its length seats the projectile's rotating band into the bore's rifling. This is different from a naval bag gun. In a bag gun: (1) The projectile, by itself, is power rammed into the chamber until its rotating band is seated in the bore's rifling. (2) The rammer is retracted. (3) The powder bags are then rammed in. This is also different from some artillery field guns: (1) The projectile is hand rammed into the chamber with a ramrod until its rotating band is seated in the bore's rifling. (2) The ramrod is retracted. (3) Next powder is placed in the chamber either as a bag or primed canister with the required charge. Note that the single ram operation used in semi-fixed guns decreases the loading time, and therefore increases the firing rate on medium and large caliber guns. For example, each of the nine 8"(203 mm)/55-caliber Rapid-Fire guns installed on the Des Moines-class cruiser used auto-loaded semi-fixed ammunition and had a firing rate of 10 to 12 rounds a minute. See also the 8"/55 caliber Mark 71 gun. 5" rounds were often used as weights for burials at sea.

=== Projectile ===
The Projectile has three major parts: the body, the fuze, and the explosive charge.

Projectile body

The body is basically a machined steel tube with an ogive shape at one end. At the ogive and rear ends are threaded openings used to the install the shell's filler and hold the fuzes. Around the tube near the base is a copper alloy ring called the Rotating Band. This band has a diameter larger than the bore, and when the projectile and powder case are rammed into the chamber, the band is jammed into the grooves of the bore's rifling. It forms a gas seal between the projectile and the bore. Also, as the projectile travels down the barrel, the band grips the rifling to impart spin to the projectile.

Fuze

The Fuse detonates the projectile to cause maximum damage to the target. Different targets required different fuzes. The safety requirements of a fuze are that...

- ... it is safe to handle. (i.e.: It will not arm if dropped, rolled, or shaken.)
- ... it remains unarmed in the bore, and until the projectile is well clear of the firing ship to protect exposed personnel. Therefore, when the gun is fired, the following events take place:
  - 14,000g acceleration from the burning propellant in the bore. This acceleration is used to setback (i.e.: Force to the rear.) some fuze parts from unarmed to armed positions due to their inertia.
  - Centrifugal force from the 12,360 rpm projectile rotation. This force causes other parts to move outward.
  - 7.2g deceleration from aerodynamic drag after the projectile leaves the muzzle. Due to inertia, other movable parts will creep forward.

All of these events must take place in the correct order to arm the fuze.

List of fuze types:

Mechanical time fuze
A nose time fuze that detonates the shell after an adjustable time interval has elapsed since firing.
Base detonating fuze
A base impact fuze screwed into the rear of a projectile to protect the fuze during impact. It delays the shell's detonation about 25 ms after impact, allowing the projectile to penetrate the target prior to detonation.
Point detonating fuze
A nose impact fuze. Very fast detonation on the surface of the target.
VT fuze
The VT (Variable Time, this is a counter-espionage decoy designation) fuze is a proximity fuze. It is a nose electronic fuze that does not require impact to trigger. Designed to detonate close to the target. It was originally intended to be used against air targets. Now it is also used in shore bombardment and surface actions against fast boats. This is because the VT fuze has proved well suited for bursting the shell at the correct distance above the ground or water for maximum damage to lightly armored targets over a large area.
Auxiliary detonating fuze
In the projectile drawing, an Auxiliary Detonating Fuze is screwed onto the bottom of the Mechanical Time Fuze. This is because the time fuze primer does not have enough explosive shock to detonate the relatively insensitive Explosive "D". The Auxiliary fuze uses an intermediate explosive that is set off by the time fuze primer, and in turn, sets off the Explosive "D".

5"/38 cal projectiles
Body label	Full name	Description
AA	Anti-aircraft	A high capacity fragmenting shell with a nose mechanical time fuze
AAC	Anti-aircraft common	A medium penetrating shell with a mechanical time fuze and a base detonating fuze. Designed to be used on either aircraft or lightly armored ships. For aircraft, the time fuze is set to explode the shell just before it reaches the target. The detonation shock wave and the expanding cone of shrapnel increases the chance of target destruction. For vessels, the time fuze is left on safe, and the base detonating fuze will explode the shell 25 milliseconds after impact.
AAVT	Anti-aircraft VT	A high capacity fragmenting shell with a VT (proximity) fuze.
AP	Armor-piercing	A thick walled penetrating projectile with a base detonating fuze. The explosive charge is usually Explosive D because it is less sensitive to impact.
SS	Star shell	A thin walled shell with a mechanical time fuze. Packed inside is a flare attached to a parachute. When the fuze fires, a small black powder charge expels the flare and parachute out the back. Before radar, star shells were used to illuminate the target at night. They are still used in support of troops at night, or illumination of an at sea rescue.
WP	White phosphorus	A thin walled shell with a point detonating fuze used for smoke screens. It also has some incendiary effect.
AA non-frag	Anti-Aircraft non-fragmentation	A thin walled shell with a mechanical time fuze and packed with a smoke producing chemical that is ejected out the rear by a small black powder charge. It is used in practice anti-aircraft shoots.
AAVT non-frag	Anti-Aircraft VT non-fragmentation	A thin walled shell with a VT fuze and packed with a smoke producing chemical that is ejected out the rear by a small black powder charge. It is used in practice anti-aircraft shoots.
BL	Blind load	A shell without a fuze, and filled with sand. It is used in practice surface shoots.
W	Window	A thin walled shell with a mechanical time fuze and packed with strips of metal foil that is ejected out the rear by a small black powder charge. It is used to confuse enemy radar.

=== Powder case ===
The powder case is a brass or steel alloy cylinder closed at one end. It holds the propelling charge and a case combination primer. The charge is held packed around the primer by a wad and plug. When rammed in the chamber with the projectile, the Full and Reduced charge cases are designed to completely fill the volume of the chamber from the breechblock face to the base of the projectile when its rotating band is jammed into the bore's rifling. In other words, the powder case acts a rammer extension for the projectile. There are three types of powder cases:

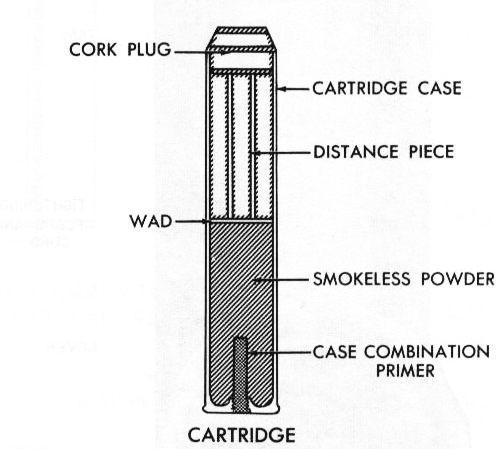
5"/38cal Reduced Service Charge.

Full service charge

A 26.7-inch (679 mm) long, 12.3-pound (5.6 kg) brass case with 15.5 pounds (7.0 kg) of smokeless or flashless (used at night) powder. The Full Service Charge new gun initial velocity is 2,600 ft/s (790 m/s). It is used in surface and anti-aircraft actions.

Reduced charge

The Reduced Charge uses the same case as the Full Service Charge, but with only 3.6 pounds (1.6 kg) of powder and a distance piece to compensate for the reduced powder volume. The Reduced Charge new gun initial velocity is 1,200 ft/s (370 m/s). It is used in shore bombardment to arc shells over obstacles like a mortar to hit targets on the opposite side, and for propelling star shells at a lower velocity to protect the parachute from being shredded while it is deployed.

Clearing charge

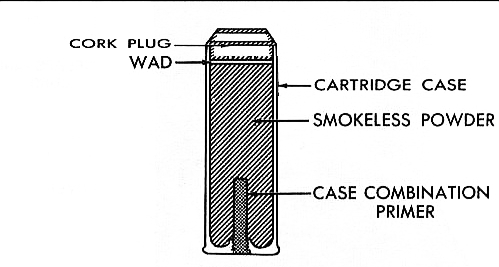
5"/38cal Clearing Charge.

The clearing charge, also known as the short round, was a special purpose charge. Its powder charge is less than a full service charge. This case is essential for the safety of the mount because it is needed to clear a gun after a misfire. Due to its importance, it is kept in a special container in the mount whenever the ship is in a combat zone. A misfire is especially dangerous in semi-fixed guns. When the breech is opened after the misfire, the faulty powder case can be extracted, but the projectile will remain jammed in the rifling. Also, all or part of the extracted case's cork plug may still be wedged in the chamber behind the projectile. This "fouls" the chamber because it decreases the chamber's volume. And, since Full and Reduced charge cases take up the full volume of an unfouled chamber (see loaded Semi-Fixed round drawing above), any residue left from the previously extracted case will prevent them from fully loading into the chamber. Therefore, the clearing charge is made short so that it will fit into a fouled chamber.

After hand extracting the bad case from the chamber, the clearing charge is removed from its special container and is hand rammed into the chamber. With the clearing charge sealed in the chamber, the projectile is fired out the muzzle. It is important to clear the projectile through the muzzle because it is not easy nor safe pushing a bore rod down the barrel to force a fuzed projectile back through the chamber and into the gun house. Also, if the gun has fired a number of rounds just prior to the misfire, time is critical because the barrel may be hot enough to cook off the high explosive in the projectile. This would destroy the mount.

== Deployment ==
(to be moved to a suitable page)

Ships launched with 5-inch/38 guns

Aircraft carriers

- 3 Yorktown-class 8
- Wasp 8
- 24 Essex-class 12

Escort Carriers

- 50 Casablanca-class 1
- 19 Commencement Bay-class 2

Battleships

- 2 North Carolina-class 20
- 3 of 4 South Dakota-class 20
- South Dakota 16
- 4 Iowa-class 20

Heavy cruisers

- Alaska 12
- Guam 12
- Wichita 8
- 14 Baltimore-class 12
- 3 Oregon City-class 12
- 3 Des Moines-class 12

Light cruisers

- 2 Brooklyn-class 8
- 4 Atlanta-class 16
- 4 Atlanta (Oakland) 12
- 27 Cleveland-class 12
- 2 Fargo-class 12
- 3 Juneau-class 12

Destroyers

- 8 Farragut-class 5
- 8 Porter-class 8
- 18 Mahan-class 5
- 4 Gridley-class 4
- 8 Bagley-class 4
- 5 Somers-class 8
- 10 Benham-class 4
- 12 Sims-class 5
- 6 Benson-class 5
- 24 repeat-Bensons 4
- 18 Gleaves-class 5
- 48 repeat-Gleaves 4
- 175 Fletcher-class 5
- 58 Allen M. Sumner-class 6
- 12 Robert H. Smith-class 6
- 98 Gearing-class 6

Destroyer escorts

- 22 Rudderow-class 2
- 50 Rudderow-APDs 1
- 83 John C. Butler-class 2
- 6 Buckley-class (launched as APDs) 1

Attack Transports

- 7 of 328 Type C2 ship
  - 3 Ormsby-class 2
  - 4 Sumter-class 2

Attack Cargo

- 74 of 328 Type C2 ship
  - Alhena (AKA-9) 1
  - 11 Arcturus-class 1
  - 32 Tolland-class 1
  - 30 Andromeda-class 1

== See also ==
- List of naval guns
- List of naval anti-aircraft guns
- Naval gunfire support

=== Weapons of comparable role, performance and era ===
- QF 4.7-inch Mk XI naval gun : British equivalent dual-purpose gun.
- QF 4.5-inch Mk I – V naval gun : British equivalent dual-purpose gun.
- 12.7 cm SK C/34 naval gun : German equivalent limited to low-angle fire.
- 12.8 cm FlaK 40 : Dedicated anti-aircraft, land-based German gun of equal calibre.
- 130 mm/50 B13 Pattern 1936 : Soviet equivalent naval and coastal gun.
- Canon de 138 mm Modèle 1929 : French equivalent naval gun.
- 120 mm naval gun : Italian equivalent naval gun.
- 12.7 cm/50 Type 3 naval gun : Japanese equivalent naval gun mounted on most destroyers and competitive against surface targets
- 10 cm/65 Type 98 naval gun: Japanese naval gun mounted on Akizuki-class destroyers, aircraft carrier Taihō and light cruiser Ōyodo, competitive in the anti-aircraft role

=== Weapons of comparable role in successive U.S. Navy service ===
- 5"/54 caliber Mark 16 gun : 1945
- 5"/54 caliber Mark 42 gun : 1953
- 5"/54 caliber Mark 45 gun : 1971

== Notes ==
- Naval Ordnance and Gunnery, Volume 1, Naval Ordnance, NAVPERS 10797-A. Washington, DC: US Navy, Bureau of Naval Personnel. 1957.
