= USS Nicholas (DD-449) =

US Navy Fletcher-class destroyer in service 1942-1970

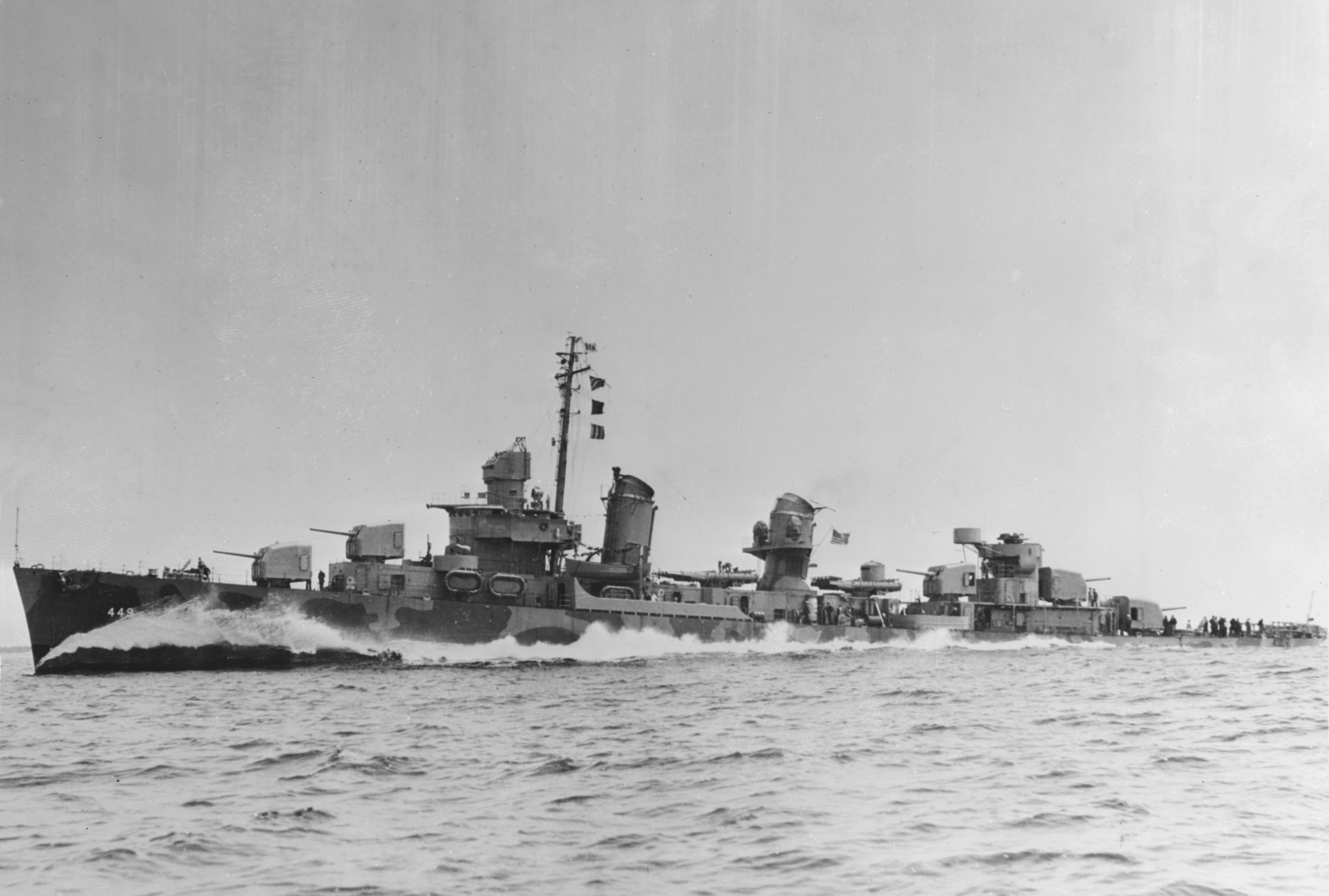
- USS Nicholas, 1942

History

United States
- Name: Nicholas
- Namesake: Major Samuel Nicholas
- Ordered: 28 June 1940
- Builder: Bath Iron Works
- Laid down: 3 March 1941
- Launched: 19 February 1942
- Commissioned: 4 June 1942
- Decommissioned: 30 January 1970
- Stricken: 30 January 1970
- Honors and awards: (x6=) 30 battle stars; Presidential Unit Citation
- Fate: Sold for scrap, October 1970
- Notes: Nicholas holds the United States Navy record for battle stars with 16 from World War II, 5 from the Korean War and 9 from the Vietnam War.

General characteristics
- Class & type: Fletcher-class destroyer
- Displacement: 2,050 tons
- Length: 376 ft 6 in (114.7 m)
- Beam: 39 ft 8 in (12.1 m)
- Draft: 17 ft 9 in (5.4 m)
- Propulsion: 60,000 shp (45 MW); 2 propellers
- Speed: 35 knots (65 km/h; 40 mph)
- Range: 6500 nmi. (12,000 km) at 15 kt
- Complement: 336
- Armament: June 1942-November 1943; 5 x 5"/38 caliber guns (5x1); 1 x 1.1"/75 caliber gun (1x4); 10 x 21-inch torpedo tubes for Mark 15 torpedoes (2x5); February 1944-; 5 x 5"/38 caliber guns (5x1); 10 x Bofors 40 mm Automatic Gun L/60s (5x2); 10 x 21-inch torpedo tubes for Mark 15 torpedoes (2x5)

USS Nicholas (DD/DDE-449) was a Fletcher-class destroyer of the United States Navy, serving for a total of 27 years, including through most of World War II, the Korean War, and the Vietnam War. She was the second Navy ship to be named for Major Samuel Nicholas.

Nicholas was laid down 3 March 1941 by the Bath Iron Works Corp., Bath, Maine, launched 19 February 1942; sponsored by Mrs. Edward B. Tryon, descendant of Major Nicholas; and commissioned 4 June 1942.

== 1942 ==
Destined to serve in the Pacific through three armed conflicts, Nicholas, assigned to Destroyer Squadron 21 (DesRon 21), departed New York City 23 August 1942, sailing in the screen of Washington (BB-56), transited the Panama Canal, and continued on to the Central Pacific, arriving at Espiritu Santo 27 September. Three days later she began escorting Guadalcanal-bound troop and supply convoys. Into 1943 she screened the convoys assembled at Espiritu Santo and Nouméa to "Cactus" area (Guadalcanal and Tulagi), guarded them as they off-loaded and then returned the vessels to their departure point. Periodically assigned to offensive duties she also conducted antisubmarine hunter-killer missions off Allied harbors, sweeps of "the Slot", bombarded shore targets and performed gunfire support missions for Marine and Army units as they pushed toward the Tenamba River and total control of the long embattled island.

== January 1943 ==
In January 1943, Nicholas was one of the Tulagi-based "Cactus Striking Force" (Task Force 67) destroyers which resisted the Japanese last counterattack for Guadalcanal by pounding the newly built enemy air facilities at Munda (4–5 January); shelling their Kokumbona-Cape Esperance escape route (19 January), and blasting their Munda resupply area at Vila on Kolombangara (23–24 January). On 26 January, the executive officer, Lt.Comdr. Andrew J. Hill took command of Nicholas.

On 1 February, as the Japanese began Operation KE—the evacuation of Guadalcanal, Nicholas covered the 2nd Battalion, 132nd Infantry, landing at Verahue and supported them as they began their trek inland to seal off the Cape Esperance area to Japanese reinforcements. En route back to Tulagi Nicholas, in company with De Haven (DD-469) and 3 LCTs, was attacked by a formation of 14 Aichi D3A "Val" dive bombers. Three bombs hit De Haven and a fourth, a near miss, holed the hull. As her sister destroyer settled in the waters of Ironbottom Sound, Nicholas fought off eight planes, receiving only near misses which killed two of her crew and damaged the steering gear.

Following repairs, Nicholas resumed her varied duties. Escort assignments and two bombardments of the Munda-Kolombangara area of New Georgia took up March. In April, she joined Task Force 18 (TF18) for "Slot" patrol and on the 19th turned her bow toward Australia for an availability at Sydney. By 11 May she was once again with TF18 en route to Kolombangara. On the 13th, while firing on enemy positions there, her #3 gun jammed and exploded, with no casualties. After repairs at Nouméa, she took up antisubmarine patrol duties and at the end of the month resumed escort duties in the Solomons-New Hebrides area.

== July 1943 ==
=== Battle of Kula Gulf ===
On 5 July she participated in another bombardment of Kolombangara. In the early morning hours of the 6th she made contact with enemy surface vessels in Kula Gulf. The battle initially went well, the light cruisers Honolulu, Saint Louis, and Helena combined fire to sink the destroyer Niizuki, before Honolulu alone wrecked the destroyer Nagatsuki. However, three torpedoes from the destroyers Suzukaze and Tanikaze hit Helena, who promptly capsized and sank. Nicholas, while rescuing 291 survivors, engaged in a gunnery duel with the destroyer Amagiri, hitting her with five 5-inch (127 mm) shells, killing ten crewmen and forcing Amagiri to disengage.

Nicholas and Radford (DD-446) were later awarded Presidential Unit Citations for their persevering performance during the Battle of Kula Gulf—a token, Admiral Chester Nimitz told the crew, of "the respect and esteem which this ship, her officers and men have well earned throughout the Navy."

=== Subsequent battles ===
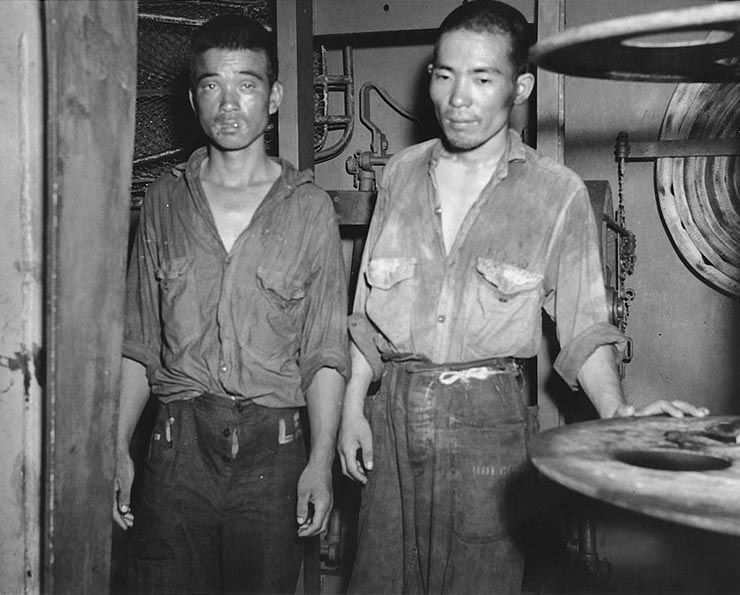
Survivors of the Japanese light cruiser Jintsu aboard Nicholas after the battle of Kolombangara

On the 12th and 13th, Nicholas participated in the Battle of Kolombangara, where she resecured survivors from the light cruiser Jintsu, sunk by cruiser gunfire and torpedoes; on the 15th covered the rescue of remaining Helena survivors from Vella LaVella; and on the 16th returned to Tulagi to resume escort duties. In early August, she joined Task Unit 31.5.1 (TU31.5.1) and on the 15th screened the advance transport group during landings at Barakoma, Vella LaVella. Back at Tulagi on the 17th, she, with O'Bannon (DD-450), Taylor (DD-468), and Chevalier (DD-451), was sent out to intercept four Rabaul-based Japanese destroyers (Sazanami, Hamakaze, Isokaze, Shigure) commanded by Rear-Admiral Baron Matsuji Ijuin providing heavy cover for an amphibious convoy tasked with the establishment of a barge staging area at Horaniu on Vella LaVella in order to facilitate the evacuation of 9,000 troops from the island. The amphibious convoy consisted of 13 Daihatsu-class landing craft and 3 motor torpedo boats (together carrying 2 companies of army troops and a naval platoon) with two subchasers (Cha-5 and Cha-12), two armored Daihatsus, another motor torpedo boat, and a Soukoutei-class armored boat providing escort. Racing up the "Slot", the American destroyers picked up their Japanese counterparts on surface radar at 00:29, 18 August, 11 miles away. To the west the radar showed a barge group. At 00:50, the American quartet feinted toward the barges. At 00:56, they swung back toward the Imperial Navy's destroyers, now five miles (nine kilometers) to the northwest. The brief engagement off Horaniu, in which the Japanese "crossed the T" of the American forces but failed to press their advantage, was broken off by the Japanese at 01:03. The American force pursued, scored on Isokaze, and finally dropped behind, engineering problems in Chevalier limiting them to 30 knots (56 km/h). They then turned their attention to the scattering amphibious convoy, destroying the two subchasers (Cha-5 and Cha-12), two motor torpedo boats, and a Daihatsu.

Nicholas returned to Vella LaVella on 19 and 20 August to conduct barge hunts and on the 24th and 25th to cover mine operations. At the end of the month she steamed to Nouméa thence to New Guinea and Australia. Back in the Solomons by October, she conducted another search for barge traffic and on the 6th covered the unloading of APDs at Barakoma. Then, 22 October, she steamed to Efate to resume escort duties.

On 11 November Nicholas departed Nadi, Fiji Islands, with Task Group 50.1 (TG50.1) for raids on Kwajalein and Wotje, after which she headed east, arriving at San Francisco 15 December for overhaul. Comdr. Robert T. S. Keith took command on 10 December.

== 1944 ==
On 12 February 1944 she resumed Central and South Pacific escort duties. On 5 April she proceeded, with DesRon 21, to Milne Bay for temporary duty with the U.S. Seventh Fleet. On the 22nd, she covered the Aitape landings, and until 8 May escorted resupply groups there and to Humboldt Bay. She then returned to the Solomons and the 3rd Fleet shelling Medina Plantation, New Ireland, on the 29th. Spending the first part of June on antisubmarine patrol, she again joined the 7th Fleet on the 14th, serving with TG70.8 in the northern Solomons. On 15 August she sailed to Manus Island to join TF74 and until the 27th operated along the New Guinea coast. She then returned to Seeadler Harbor whence she supported the Morotai operation 15–30 September.

On 18 October, the destroyer, now in TG 78.7 escorted reinforcements to Leyte, arriving on the 24th. On the 25th and 26th, she patrolled off Dinagat Island and on the 27th set out again for Manus. On 8 November she sailed for Ulithi, whence she headed for Kossol Roads. En route to the latter, her three-ship formation, Taylor and St. Louis (CL-49), was closed by a submarine, 12 November. Leaving the formation. Nicholas pressed home two depth charge attacks, sinking I-38.

Four days later, Nicholas joined TG77.1 on continuous patrol of the southern end of Leyte Gulf. There until 6 December she survived 4 attacks by kamikaze suicide-plane formations, 27 and 29 November and 2 and 5 December. On 6 December she assisted in a sweep of the Camotes Sea, bombarded Japanese Naval facilities on Ormoc Bay and then covered Allied landings there. On the 10th she sailed for Manus, returning to Leyte on the 28th for further escort work.

== 1945 ==
On the first day of the new year, 1945, the destroyer joined TG77.3, the Close Support Group for the Lingayen Gulf assault. En route to Luzon, her group was harassed by enemy midget submarines and almost constant air raids. After a two-day bombardment, Army troops landed at Lingayen Gulf 9 January. Until the 18th, Nicholas provided fire support, then patrolled to the west of Luzon with the covering escort carrier group. On the 24th, she captured a motor boat being used by three Japanese to escape from the island and on the 29th provided close cover for the landings in Zambales Province.

During the first part of February she escorted vessels between Leyte and Mindoro, whence she proceeded to Manila Bay to shell Corregidor, other islands in Manila Bay, and shore installations at Mariveles. Resuming escort work on the 17th, she guarded minesweepers as they cleared Basilan Strait in mid-March and then supported the occupation of the Zamboanga area. In April. she returned to Luzon to support the Sixth Army as it fought to reoccupy the island and then on the 24th resumed operations in the Netherlands East Indies. From then until 5 May she supported the Tarakan operation after which she steamed north again to Luzon, thence to Leyte where she joined TU30.12.2 and departed for Okinawa, 15 June. Following strikes on Sakishima, she joined TG30.8 at Ulithi and screened that group as it refueled and resupplied the fast aircraft carriers at sea. On 11 August she reported to CTG38.4, a fast carrier task group, and on the 13th screened the carriers during strikes against the Tokyo area. On the 15th hostilities ceased.

Approaching Japan in August 1945, Admiral William Halsey, commander of the U.S. Third Fleet ordered that Nicholas and her sisters O'Bannon and Taylor be present in Tokyo Bay for Japan's surrender "because of their valorous fight up the long road from the South Pacific to the very end." Nicholas was the first ship to sail into Tokyo bay. Assigned to his Flagship Task Group, Nicholas disseminated Japanese pilots and peace emissaries among the fleet, escorted battleship Missouri (BB-63) into Tokyo Bay, and transported Allied and U.S. representatives to the formal surrender on Missouri 2 September. Nicholas then joined in the repatriation of Allied POWs. Departing the Far East 5 October, she arrived at Seattle on the 19th and continued on to San Pedro, arriving 1 November to begin inactivation.

== 1946 – 1959 ==
Decommissioned 12 June 1946, Nicholas remained in the Pacific Reserve Fleet until hostilities in Korea necessitated her recall. Reclassified DDE-449, 26 March 1949, she was brought out of reserve to begin conversion in November 1950. Recommissioned 19 February 1951, she underwent shakedown off the west coast, steamed to Pearl Harbor where she joined CortDesDiv 12, CortDesRon 1; and continued on to the Western Pacific, arriving at Yokosuka 10 June. In Far Eastern waters until 14 November, she screened the carriers of TF77 off the west coast of Korea; conducted ASW exercises between Yokosuka and Okinawa; and patrolled the Taiwan Strait. On 3 May 1952 she departed Pearl Harbor again for Korea. A temporary replacement vessel in DesDiv 112, she served first with TF77 and then swung around the peninsula to the gun line off the Korean east coast and operated there, under CTF95, until sailing for home in July. She returned to Korea with CortDesDiv 12 in November and remained in the Far East until 20 May 1953 performing missions similar to her 1951 deployment.

After Korea Nicholas rotated duty in WestPac with 1st Fleet assignments. Her 7th Fleet deployments took her from Japan to Sumatra, while EastPac assignments ranged primarily from Hawaii to the west coast. On occasion 1st Fleet duty sent her to the Central Pacific as in 1954 when she assisted in Operation Castle, an atomic test series.

== 1960 – 1970 ==
Nicholas underwent a Fleet Rehabilitation and Modernization (FRAM) update between December 1959 and July 1960, emerging from the shipyard in time for her annual rotation to WestPac, which, that year, sent her, for the first time since World War II, to the South China Sea for extensive operations. Reclassified DD-449 on 1 July 1962, she returned to the South China Sea in March 1965. There she became one of the first ships engaged in Operation Market Time—patrol of the jagged South Vietnamese coastline to prohibit smuggling of men, weapons, and supplies into South Vietnam by Viet Cong and North Vietnamese junks and sampans.

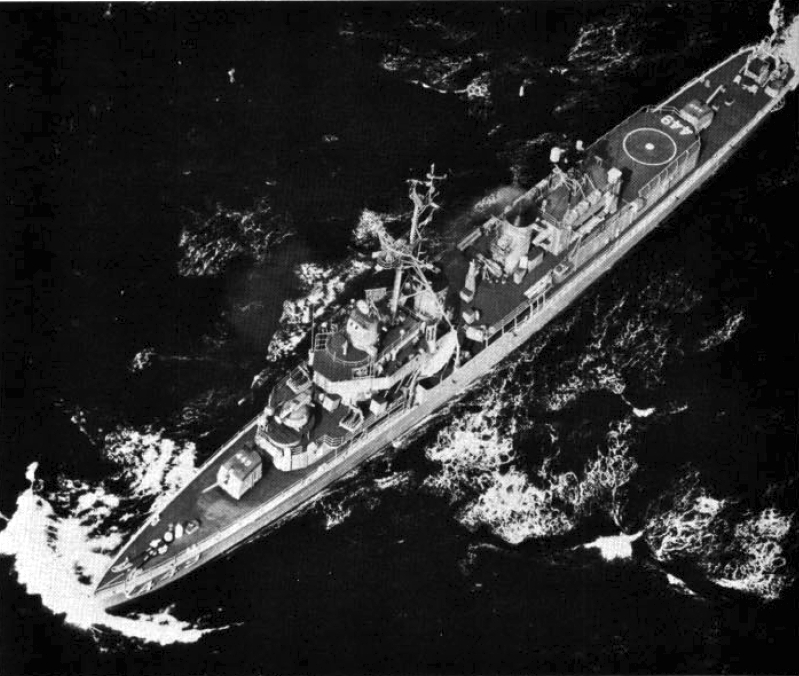
Nicholas after her FRAM II-conversion.

Relieved of duty 15 April, Nicholas returned to Pearl Harbor only to depart again for Viet Nam in mid-September. Off the embattled coast by 1 October, she carried out surveillance assignments and gunfire support duties until 3 December, when she proceeded to Taiwan for patrol duty in Taiwan Strait. Early in 1966 she returned to Viet Nam for duty on "Yankee Station" in the Gulf of Tonkin, followed by another tour on "Market Time" patrol. Homeward bound at the end of February, she proceeded to Australia, thence to Hawaii, arriving 17 March.

Each WestPac tour since that time has followed a similar employment schedule. Her gunfire support missions during her November 1966–May 1967 tour included participation in Operation Deckhouse Five in the Mekong Delta area, as well as missions close to the DMZ. Most of her 1968 tour was again spent in Vietnamese waters, this time, however, with a greater portion spent on "Yankee Station" and on gunfire support missions.

On her return to EastPac in 1968, Nicholas was assigned to support NASA's Apollo Program. From 8 to 23 October and again between 19 and 22 December she operated in the Pacific space capsule recovery areas; first for the Apollo 7 mission, then for Apollo 8. After each of these assignments she returned to Pearl Harbor for training exercises in Hawaiian waters in preparation for a return to the Western Pacific.

On 30 January 1970, having become the navy's oldest active destroyer eight years earlier, the "Nick" was decommissioned in a ceremony at Pearl Harbor (again side by side with O'Bannon), stricken from the Navy List, towed to Portland, Oregon, and then broken up in 1972. At the time she was retired, only seven other Fletchers remained in service with the US Navy.

As of 2023, the ship's mast was at the Veterans Memorial Museum in Chehalis, Washington and the ship's bell was at Center House, Marine Barracks, Washington, D.C.

== Awards ==
Nicholas was awarded a Presidential Unit Citation for her service during World War II. The citation states:

For outstanding performance in action against enemy Japanese forces off Kolombangara Island, New Georgia Group, Solomon Islands, on the night of July 5–6, 1943. After waging a vigorous battle as part of the small Task Force which destroyed a superior Japanese surface force, the NICHOLAS remained behind with an accompanying destroyer to save the survivors of the torpedoed U.S.S. HELENA. Forced to clear the area on three occasions during rescue operations, she gallantly fought off continuing attacks by Japanese warships emerging from Kula Gulf and, with the other destroyer, sank or damaged an enemy light cruiser and two destroyers with deadly torpedo and gunfire, returning to the area after each onslaught to complete the heroic rescue of more than seven hundred survivors. The valorous achievements of the NICHOLAS reflect great credit upon the United States Naval Service.

In addition to her Presidential Unit Citation, Nicholas earned 16 battle stars in World War II, placing her among the most decorated US Naval vessels of World War II, a total surpassed among destroyers only by her sister ship, USS O'Bannon. She earned five more in the Korean War and nine in the Vietnam War for a total of 30, a number unmatched by any other U.S. Navy ship in the twentieth century.
