= Japanese submarine chaser Cha-5 =

History

Empire of Japan
- Name: Cha-5
- Builder: Hikoshima Iron Works
- Laid down: 10 January 1942
- Launched: 3 August 1942
- Sponsored by: Hayashikane Shoten K.K.
- Completed: 26 February 1943
- Stricken: 1 November 1943
- Home port: Sasebo
- Fate: Sunk by naval gunfire, 18 August 1943

General characteristics
- Class & type: No.1-class Submarine chaser
- Displacement: 130 long tons (132 t) standard
- Length: 29.20 m (95 ft 10 in) overall
- Beam: 5.65 m (18 ft 6 in)
- Draught: 1.97 m (6 ft 6 in)
- Propulsion: 1 × intermediate diesel; shingle shaft, 400 bhp
- Speed: 11.0 knots (12.7 mph; 20.4 km/h)
- Range: 1,000 nmi (1,900 km) at 10.0 kn (11.5 mph; 18.5 km/h)
- Complement: 32
- Armament: 1 × 7.7 mm machine gun; 22 × depth charges; 1 × dunking hydrophone; 1 × simple sonar; From mid 1943, the 7.7 mm machine gun was replaced with a 13.2mm machine gun

Cha-5 or No. 5 (Japanese: 第五號驅潜特務艇) was a No.1-class auxiliary submarine chaser of the Imperial Japanese Navy that served during World War II.

== History ==
She was laid down on 10 January 1942 by Hikoshima Iron Works for the benefit of fishing company Hayashikane Shoten K.K. and launched on 3 August 1942. She was completed on 26 February 1943 and assigned to the Sasebo Defense Force, Sasebo Naval District on 26 February 1943. On 1 June 1943, she was reassigned to the First Base Force, Eighth Fleet and traveled to Rabaul to support Army operations in the South Pacific.

== Battle off Horaniu ==
On 17 August 1943, she was assigned to escort duty for 13 Daihatsu-class landing craft and 3 motor torpedo boats carrying 2 companies of army troops and a naval platoon tasked with establishing a barge depot and staging base at Horaniu on the northeast part of Vella Lavella in order to facilitate the evacuation of 9,000 troops from the island. She was accompanied by subchaser Cha-12, two armored Daihatsus, another motor torpedo boat, and a Soukoutei-class armored boat with four destroyers (Sazanami, Hamakaze, Isokaze, and Shigure) commanded by Rear-Admiral Baron Matsuji Ijuin providing heavy cover. The convoy left Buin on the 17th and on 18 August 1943, they were attacked by the USS destroyers USS Nicholas, USS Chevalier, USS O'Bannon, and USS Taylor. In the ensuing Battle off Horaniu, she was sunk by gunfire along with Cha-12, two torpedo boats, and one Daihatsu north of Vella Lavella.

She was struck from the Navy List on 1 November 1943.
