= Japanese submarine chaser Cha-12 =

History

Japanese Imperial Navy
- Name: Cha-12
- Builder: 念組造船鐵工所
- Laid down: 11 January 1942
- Launched: 8 January 1943
- Completed: 6 April 1943
- Stricken: 1 November 1943
- Home port: Sasebo
- Fate: Sunk by naval gunfire, 18 August 1943

General characteristics
- Class & type: No.1-class Submarine chaser
- Displacement: 130 long tons (132 t) standard
- Length: 29.20 m (95 ft 10 in) overall
- Beam: 5.65 m (18 ft 6 in)
- Draught: 1.97 m (6 ft 6 in)
- Propulsion: 1 × intermediate diesel; shingle shaft, 400 bhp
- Speed: 11.0 knots (12.7 mph; 20.4 km/h)
- Range: 1,000 nmi (1,900 km) at 10.0 kn (11.5 mph; 18.5 km/h)
- Complement: 32
- Armament: 1 × 7.7 mm machine gun; 22 × depth charges; 1 × dunking hydrophone; 1 × simple sonar; From mid 1943, the 7.7 mm machine gun was replaced with a 13.2mm machine gun

Cha-12 or No. 12 (Japanese: 第十二號驅潜特務艇) was a No.1-class auxiliary submarine chaser of the Imperial Japanese Navy that served during World War II.

== History ==
She was laid down on 11 January 1942 and launched on 8 January 1943. She was completed on 6 April 1943. She was assigned to the Sasebo Defense Force, Sasebo Naval District on 6 April 1943. On 1 June 1943, she was reassigned to the First Base Force, Eighth Fleet.

== Battle off Horaniu ==
On 17 August 1943, she was assigned to escort duty for 13 Daihatsu-class landing craft and 3 motor torpedo boats carrying 2 companies of army troops and a naval platoon tasked with establishing a barge depot and staging base at Horaniu on the northeast part of Vella Lavella in order to facilitate the evacuation of 9,000 troops from the island. She was accompanied by subchaser Cha-5, two armored Daihatsus, another motor torpedo boat, and a Soukoutei-class armored boat with four destroyers (Sazanami, Hamakaze, Isokaze, and Shigure) commanded by Rear-Admiral Baron Matsuji Ijuin providing heavy cover. The convoy left Buin on the 17th and on 18 August 1943, they were attacked by the US destroyers USS Nicholas, USS Chevalier, USS O'Bannon, and USS Taylor. In the ensuing Battle off Horaniu, she was sunk along with Cha-5, two torpedo boats, and one Daihatsu by gunfire north of Vella Lavella.

She was struck from the Navy List on 1 November 1943.
