= Battle of Vella Lavella (naval) =

1943 Pacific WWII naval battle

Coordinates: 7°30′S 156°14′E

- Part of the Pacific Theater of World War II
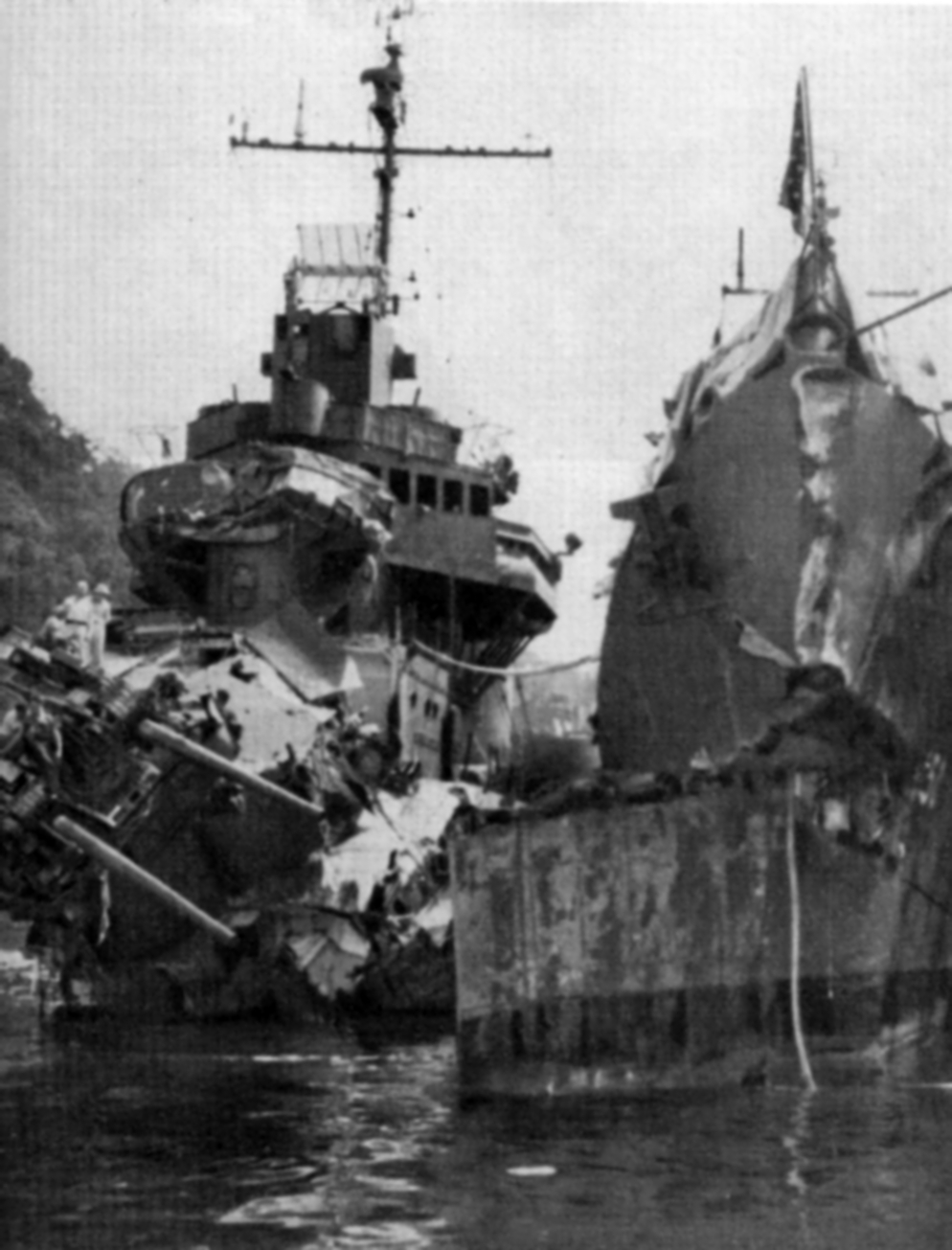
- The destroyers USS Selfridge and O'Bannon at Nouméa after the battle.
Date	6 October 1943
Location	Vella Lavella in the Solomon Islands
Result	Japanese victory

Belligerents
United States	Empire of Japan

Commanders and leaders
Frank R. Walker	Matsuji Ijuin

Strength
6 destroyers	9 destroyers 20 barges auxiliary ships

Casualties and losses
1 destroyer sunk 2 destroyers heavily damaged, 67 killed 47 wounded 36 missing	1 destroyer sunk, 138 killed 103 captured

The Battle of Vella Lavella (第二次ベララベラ海戦, Dainiji Berarabera kaisen) was a naval battle of the Pacific campaign of World War II fought on the night of 6 October 1943, near the island of Vella Lavella in the Solomon Islands. It marked the end of a three-month fight to capture the central Solomon Islands, as part of the Solomon Islands campaign.

The battle took place at the end of the ground campaign on Vella Lavella, as the Japanese sought to evacuate the 600-strong garrison from the island. The garrison had become hemmed into a small pocket on the northern end of the island around Marquana Bay. While a force of around 20 auxiliary ships and barges evacuated the stranded soldiers, a force of 9 Japanese destroyers fought a short, but sharp engagement with 6 US Navy destroyers to the north of the island, thus diverting attention from the evacuation. As a result of the engagement, the Japanese evacuation effort was successfully concluded. Each side lost one destroyer sunk.

== Background ==
After their defeats around Munda on New Georgia and at sea in the Battle of Vella Gulf, the Japanese began evacuating their garrisons in the central Solomons. Following the Battle off Horaniu, a staging post had been established at Horaniu on the north coast of Vella Lavella for the evacuation barges. After the Allies secured New Georgia in August, the Japanese withdrew the bulk of their forces to Kolombangara. Rather than directly assaulting this force, the Allies decided to bypass Kolombangara. Troops from the US and New Zealand subsequently landed on Vella Lavella in mid-August and began clearing the coastal areas, pushing the Japanese towards the northwest shore. The barge depot around Horaniu was captured by US forces, and by early October 1943, only 600 Japanese soldiers remained. The garrison was hemmed into a small pocket around Marquana Bay, where they were surrounded by troops from the New Zealand 14th Brigade.

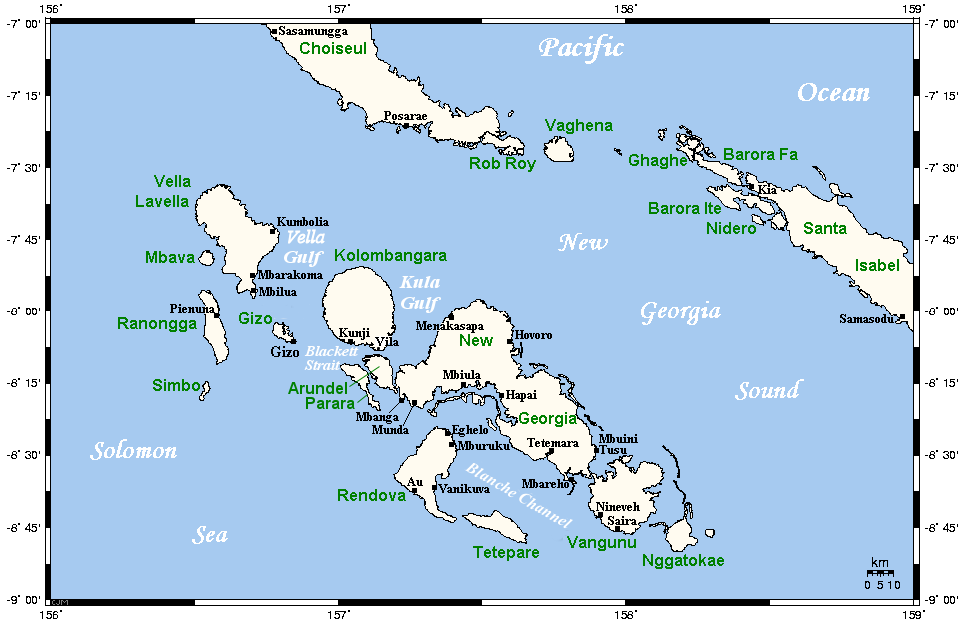
New Georgia Islands

Following the evacuation of Kolombangara, the next major island in the New Georgia chain, lying between New Georgia and Vella Lavella, the Japanese decided to withdraw the troops stranded on Vella Lavella. On 6 October, an assortment of 20 auxiliary ships (including subchasers, barges, and other small vessels) under Captain Shigoroku Nakayama, was dispatched from Buin, on Bougainville Island, to rescue them. A force of three older destroyer-transports—Fumizuki, Matsukaze, and Yūnagi—escorted by six modern fully combat-ready destroyers—Akigumo, Isokaze, Kazagumo, Yūgumo, Shigure, and Samidare—was dispatched from Rabaul under Captain Matsuji Ijuin to cover the evacuation.

== Battle ==
On the evening 6–7 October, the Japanese destroyer force under Ijuin was cruising northwest of Vella Lavella. Earlier, Ijuin had detached the three destroyer-transports along with Shigure and Samidare to proceed towards Marquana Bay. In response, US Admiral Theodore Stark Wilkinson, commanding the US amphibious forces assigned to the New Georgia campaign, hurriedly rerouted two groups of three destroyers each to attempt to disrupt the evacuation. Only the first group arrived in time to engage in combat. At 22:30, the Japanese spotted the US force of three destroyers—Selfridge, Chevalier, and O'Bannon, commanded by Captain Frank R. Walker—approaching from Vella Gulf.

A second division of three US destroyers—Ralph Talbot, Taylor, and La Vallette—under Captain Harold O. Larson, had been detached from convoy duty further south in the Solomons with orders to join up with Walker. These three additional ships were making speed up the west coast of Vella Lavella towards his division. Shigure and Samidare subsequently sought to rejoin the four destroyers under Ijuin, who began battle preparations, while the three destroyer transports began to retire towards the Shortland Islands.

Walker did not wait for the three destroyers under Larson to come up, however, and attacked immediately. Both sides launched torpedoes and opened fire around 23:00. A tactical error by the Japanese commander resulted in his force losing the initial advantage and placing them at close range along the US ships' line of fire. Yūgumo, first in the Japanese line, was hit several times, knocking out her steering after charging the US destroyers and firing several torpedoes. It was finished off by a torpedo and sunk around 23:10. However, one of her torpedoes hit Chevalier, detonating the forward magazine.

O'Bannon then collided with the crippled Chevalier, and for some time the two ships were locked together. Selfridge attacked alone, firing at both Shigure and Samidare, but was hit by a torpedo at 23:06 and disabled. All three ships were severely damaged, and reinforcements were still 15 minutes away. The rest of the Japanese force turned away after patrol aircraft misidentified the three approaching US destroyers as cruisers. Ijuin ordered his force and the destroyer transports to withdraw back towards Rabaul while the auxiliaries completed the evacuation.

== Aftermath ==
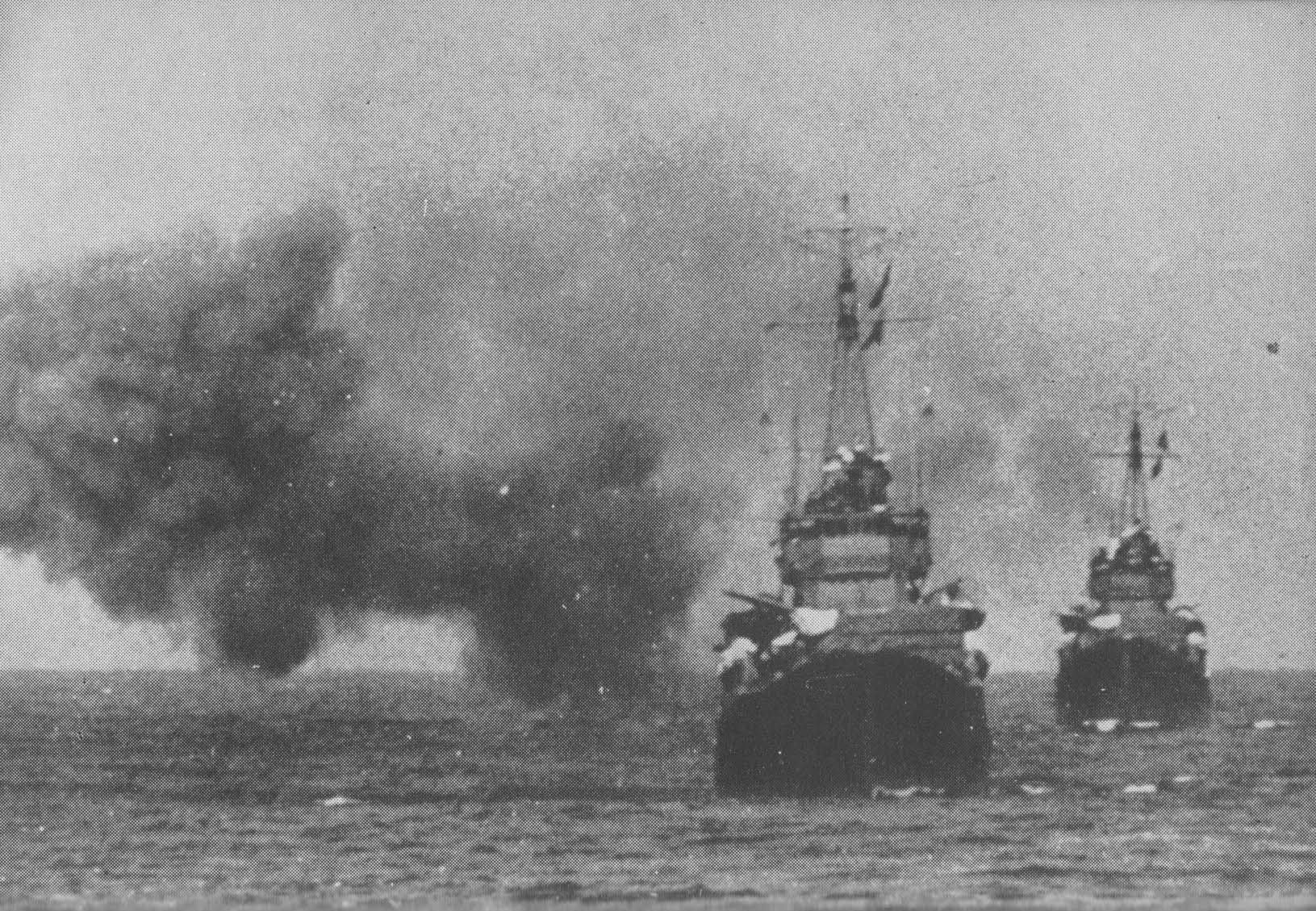
Shigure and Samidare off Bougainville just hours before the battle.

Larson's destroyer division arrived on the scene around 23:35 and subsequently began searching for the departing Japanese destroyers, briefly picking up a radar contact on Yugumo as she sank. Shortly after midnight, Larson began rescue operations. Wounded were cross-loaded from Chevalier, and the crippled ship was scuttled around 03:00 with La Vallette firing a torpedo into Chevalier's magazine and then destroying her bow with depth charges. Selfridge and O'Bannon, however, despite being heavily damaged, remained afloat and were subsequently withdrawn for repairs. The Japanese completed their evacuation mission, with Nakayama's force entering Marquana Bay around 01:10 while American attention was focused on the recovery and departing two hours later, withdrawing 589 troops to Buin.

Casualties during the battle amounted to 67 killed, 47 wounded, and 36 missing for the Americans. Of these, 54 were killed on Chevalier and 13 on Selfridge. Thirty-six were wounded on Chevalier and 11 on Selfridge. All missing were from the Selfridge. The Japanese lost 138 killed, with about 25 crew being rescued by boats from O'Bannon, and another 78 by US PT boats. This ended the second phase of Operation Cartwheel—the reduction of the main Japanese base at Rabaul—with the Allied capture of the central Solomons after a three-month campaign that cost the Allies six ships; the Japanese lost seventeen. According to author Ian Toll, the naval battle of Vella Lavella was the last Japanese naval victory of the Pacific War.
