= Battle off Horaniu =

Minor naval battle of the Pacific campaign of World War II

Coordinates: 7°42′0″S 156°43′0″E

- Part of the Pacific Theater of World War II
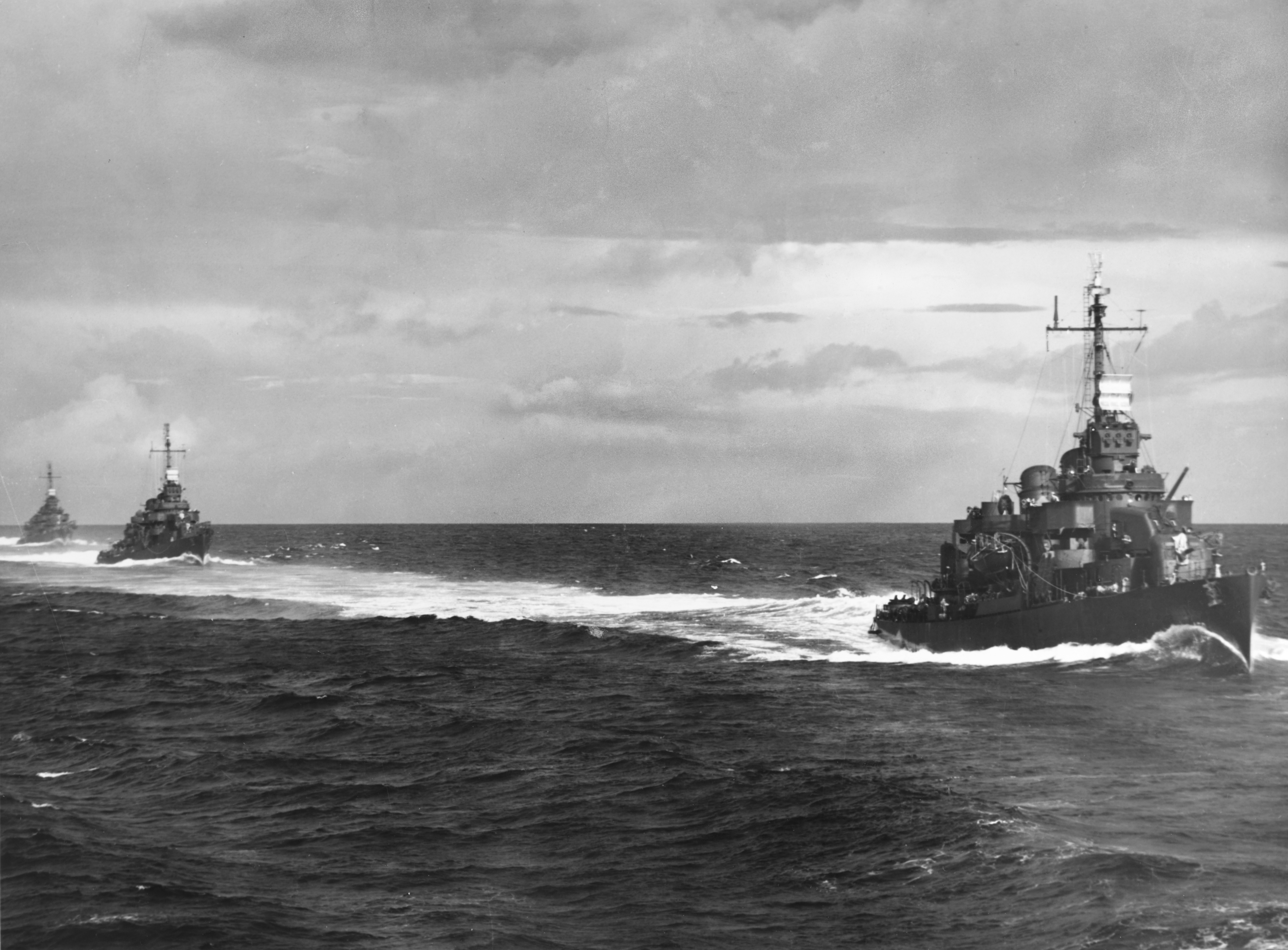
- U.S. destroyers (from right to left): O'Bannon, Chevalier, and Taylor head towards Tulagi harbor in the Solomon Islands on 15 August 1943, two days before engaging in the Battle off Horaniu.
Date	17–18 August 1943
Location	Near Vella Lavella in the Solomon Islands
Result	Japanese victory

Belligerents
United States	Japan

Commanders and leaders
(United States) Thomas J. Ryan	(Empire of Japan) Matsuji Ijuin

Strength
4 destroyers	4 destroyers, 22 barges and auxiliary ships

Casualties and losses
None	5 auxiliary ships sunk, 2 destroyers slightly damaged

The Battle off Horaniu (Japanese: 第一次ベララベラ海戦) was a minor naval battle of the Pacific campaign of World War II, fought near Vella Lavella in the Solomon Islands. On the night of 17–18 August 1943, four United States Navy destroyers intercepted an Imperial Japanese Navy convoy carrying troops to Horaniu, on the northern coast of Vella Lavella, where they were to establish a barge base to support the movement of troops through the region.

The Japanese convoy was escorted by four destroyers, and both sides exchanged torpedoes and gunfire from long range. After two Japanese destroyers were slightly damaged, the escort withdrew, allowing the U.S. force to sink five small ships from the convoy. However, the majority of the troop-carrying barges escaped by hiding along the Vella Lavella coast and subsequently completed their mission on 19 August. In October, the Japanese used the base to support the mass withdrawal of troops from Kolombangara.

== Background ==
In mid-1943, in the wake of the Guadalcanal campaign, the Allies launched their next offensive in the Solomon Islands, focused upon seizing the major Japanese airstrip at Munda on New Georgia. After the fall of Munda on 4–5 August and defeat in the Battle of Vella Gulf on 6–7 August, the Japanese decided to evacuate their garrisons in the central Solomons, firstly moving to Baanga Island while planning to bring forces south from Rabaul for a potential counterattack.

On 15 August, the Allies landed on Vella Lavella, bypassing the main Japanese troop concentration on Kolombangara. To maintain contact with these troops, and ensure their later withdrawal, the Japanese planned to establish a staging base at Horaniu, on the northern tip of Vella Lavella.

Commanded by Captain Matsuji Ijuin, the destroyers Sazanami, Hamakaze, Isokaze, and Shigure left Rabaul on 17 August to rendezvous with a troop convoy from Buin, on Bougainville. This convoy included 13 barges, four motor torpedo boats, the subchasers Cha-12 and Cha-5, and a Soukoutei-class armored boat. The troops embarked consisted of two Imperial Japanese Army companies and an Imperial Japanese Navy platoon.

== Battle ==
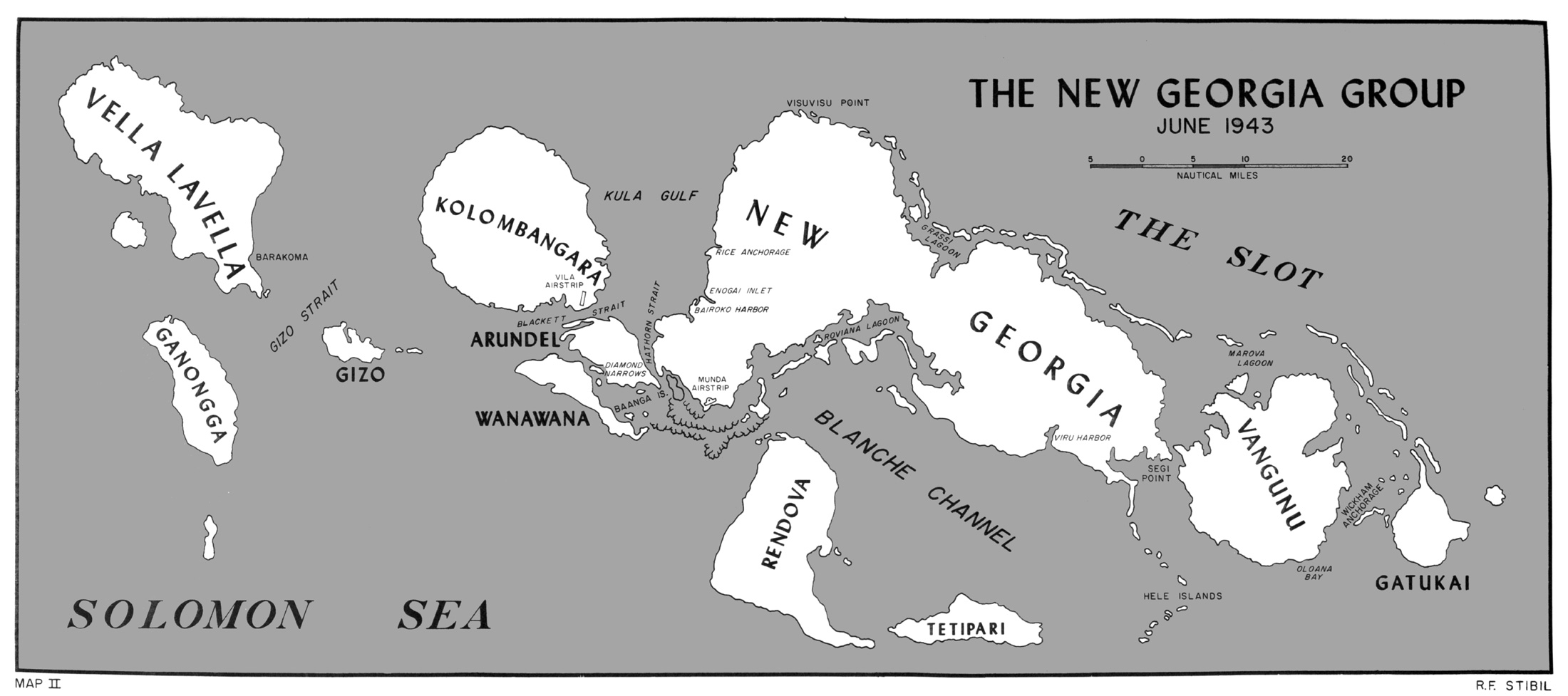
The New Georgia islands including Vella Lavella (far left)

After the Japanese force was located by Allied reconnaissance aircraft, Rear Admiral Theodore S. Wilkinson, commander of the Third Amphibious Force, dispatched a division of four destroyers from Purvis Bay on Florida Island to intercept them. This force consisted of USS Nicholas, O'Bannon, Taylor, and Chevalier, under Captain Thomas J. Ryan. They departed their anchorage at 15:27 on 17 August and began a fast run up the New Georgia Sound, also known as "The Slot". When Ryan's destroyers were off the north coast of Kolombangara, lookouts on watch saw a burst of anti-aircraft fire in the distance, giving away the position of the Japanese convoy.

Despite a full moon, visibility was limited to 3 miles (4.8 km) due to low-lying clouds and intermittent rain showers. However, at about 23:30, the Japanese convoy was attacked by eight AirSols Avenger torpedo bombers and forced to scatter, although no ships were damaged. Two of the escorts, Isokaze and Shigure, sailing abreast, began herding the smaller craft back into formation, while Sazanami and Hamakaze continued on a northwesterly course. Ryan was advised by the Avengers the Japanese ships were still heading for Vella Lavella, although his destroyers were detected shortly afterwards by a Japanese reconnaissance aircraft, which began circling in preparation for an attack. The convoy was still reforming when at 00:29 on 18 August Ryan's radar detected the Japanese destroyers to the northwest at a range of 23,000 yards (21,000 m), then the Japanese barges; at 00:32, Japanese lookouts spotted the U.S. destroyers, which had closed to 16,400 yards (15,000 m).

The Japanese convoy was still 16 nautical miles (30 km; 18 mi) short of its destination, and Ijuin was under orders to avoid decisive engagement. He dispatched two of his destroyers to turn to the north in an effort to lure the U.S. force away from the troop-carrying vessels. To conceal his position, Ryan decided not to use his deck guns and began maneuvering for a torpedo attack on the Japanese destroyers, rather than attacking the barges. This surprised Ijuin who had expected the opposite. Around 00:40, the Japanese aircraft dropped several flares over the U.S. ships, giving away their location, and Ryan turned back to engage the convoy to his east. Ijuin ordered his ships to begin firing torpedoes six minutes later, loosing 31 between 00:50 and 00:54 at a range of 12,500 yards (11,400 m). By making a series of turns to avoid the Japanese barges, the American destroyers unintentionally avoided all 31 torpedoes, and around 00:56, the Japanese gunners opened fire. However, to avoid revealing their position their searchlights were turned off, and no damage was inflicted on Ryan's destroyers.

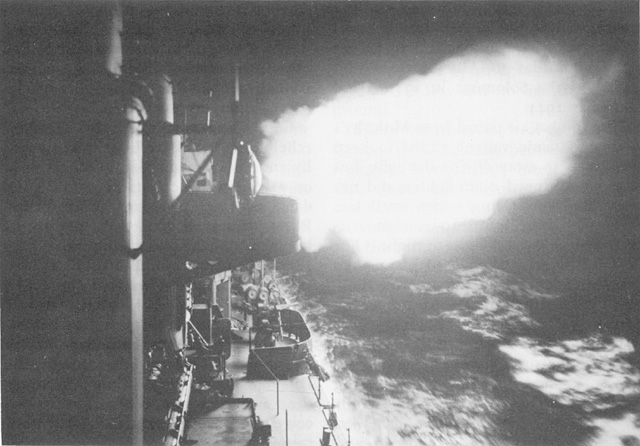
U.S. destroyers firing off Horaniu early on 18 August 1943

After a series of turns, the U.S. destroyers opened fire with radar-controlled 5-inch guns at 00:58, which damaged Hamakaze, while Chevalier loosed a salvo of four torpedoes towards Shigure from a distance of 9,000 yards (8,200 m). This attack was unsuccessful. The Japanese ships laid down a smokescreen and began to zigzag to throw off the U.S. gunners' aim. Torpedo attacks by both Shigure and Isokaze were also unsuccessful and were followed by an inaccurate radar report that another U.S. naval force was advancing from the south. Ijuin could not afford to lose any of his destroyers, and after an ineffective long-range exchange of torpedoes and gunfire he ordered them to withdraw at about 01:00. Ryan's ships kept firing until the Japanese were out of range, then pursued them, moving onto a parallel course while undertaking evasive maneuvers until 01:11 to avoid any torpedoes that might have been fired. At this time, Isokaze fired a torpedo salvo from 8 miles (13 km), which failed to score a hit but in return was damaged by an American 5-inch shell, wounding several sailors.

Due to a mechanical fault on Chevalier, the Americans were unable to catch the fast-moving Japanese destroyers, who were withdrawing at 35 knots (65 km/h; 40 mph). Ryan turned back to locate the troop convoy, but the small craft had taken advantage of the destroyer contest to disperse; although the Americans managed to sink five, the majority subsequently escaped. Harassed by the Japanese reconnaissance aircraft, Ryan's destroyers returned to Tulagi.

== Aftermath ==
As a result of the battle, a total of five Japanese auxiliary ships were sunk. This included two subchasers, two motor torpedo boats, and one powered barge with an unknown number of personnel killed or injured. Two destroyers, Hamakaze and Isokaze, were slightly damaged, although this was not significant and both took part in further actions three days later. Despite these losses, the Japanese saved the majority of their barges which spent 18 August quietly lying in hiding along the northern coast of Vella Lavella and were subsequently able to land 390 troops on 19 August. These personnel established a barge base at Horaniu, while Ijuin's force returned to Rabaul believing that they had sunk one U.S. destroyer. Tameichi Hara, commanding Destroyer Division 27 during the operation, described the aftermath saying: "The landing operation was an unquestioned success", while criticizing Ryan's failure to destroy the unprotected Japanese barges.

The Japanese withdrawal in the central Solomons continued throughout August and September. After Baanga Island was evacuated on 22 August, the Japanese garrison withdrew to Arundel Island, and over the course of a month they fought a series of delaying actions there until late September. Meanwhile, on Vella Lavella, Horaniu fell to Allied forces on 14 September, while the base's 600 personnel were pushed into a small perimeter on the northwestern part of the island. They were withdrawn on the night of 6–7 October, along with almost 10,000 troops that were evacuated from Kolombangara to Choisel and Bougainville.
