= USS Taylor (DD-468) =

Fletcher-class destroyer

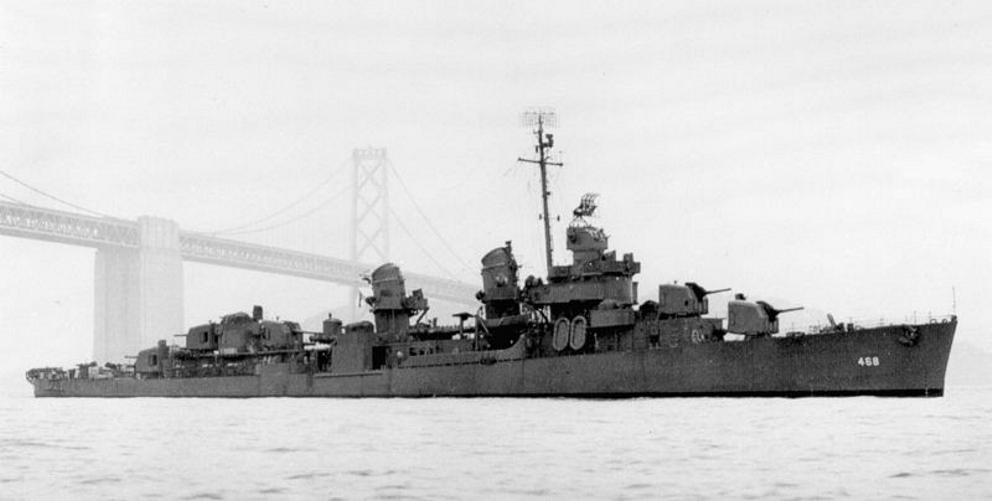
- USS Taylor (DD-468), 1944.

History

United States
- Namesake: William Rogers Taylor
- Builder: Bath Iron Works
- Laid down: 28 August 1941
- Launched: 7 June 1942
- Commissioned: 28 August 1942
- Decommissioned: 3 June 1969
- Stricken: 2 July 1969
- Fate: Transferred to Italy, 2 July 1969

History

Italy
- Name: Lanciere
- Acquired: 2 July 1969
- Decommissioned: January 1971
- Stricken: January 1971
- Fate: Cannibalized for parts

General characteristics
- Class & type: Fletcher-class destroyer
- Displacement: 2,050 tons
- Length: 376 ft 6 in (114.7 m)
- Beam: 39 ft 8 in (12.1 m)
- Draft: 17 ft 9 in (5.4 m)
- Propulsion: 60,000 shp (45 MW); 2 propellers
- Speed: 35 knots (65 km/h; 40 mph)
- Range: 6500 nmi. (12,000 km) at 15 kt
- Complement: 336
- Armament: 5 × single Mk 12 5 in (127 mm)/38 guns; 5 × twin 40 mm (1.6 in) Bofors AA guns; 7 × single 20 mm (0.8 in) Oerlikon AA guns; 2 × quintuple 21 in (533 mm) torpedo tubes; 6 × single depth charge throwers; 2 × depth charge racks

USS Taylor (DD/DDE-468) was a Fletcher-class destroyer of the United States Navy, named for Rear Admiral William Rogers Taylor (1811–1889). She was laid down on 28 August 1941 at Bath, Maine, by the Bath Iron Works Corp.; launched on 7 June 1942, sponsored by Mrs. H. A. Baldridge; and commissioned on 28 August 1942 at the Charlestown Navy Yard near Boston, Mass.

Taylor was the first destroyer to anchor in Japanese coastal waters at the end of World War II – one that, wrote Admiral William F. Halsey, "admirably performed every mission assigned to her."

== World War II ==
Taylor began her naval career with the Atlantic Fleet. Assigned to Destroyer Squadron 20 (DESRON TWO ZERO), the destroyer trained at Casco Bay, Maine, and made her shakedown cruise in the northern Atlantic before beginning duty as a coastwise convoy escort. The latter duty lasted until mid-November when she escorted a transatlantic convoy to a point just off Casablanca. The transit was uneventful, save for the interception of a Spanish merchantman, SS Darro. A boarding party from Taylor sent the neutral ship off to Gibraltar to prevent her from transmitting information about the convoy to the enemy. Taylor returned to the United States at Norfolk early in December and remained there until mid-month.

=== Rennell Island, Jan. 1943 ===
On 17 December, the warship cleared Hampton Roads in company with Task Force 13 (TF 13) on her way to duty with the Pacific Fleet. After transiting the Panama Canal and stopping at Tutuila in the Samoan Islands, the destroyer reported at Noumea, New Caledonia, on 20 January 1943 for duty in the South West Pacific Area. From Nouméa, Taylor continued west to Efate in the New Hebrides group, entering Havannah Harbor on the 26th. There, she became a unit of Destroyer Squadron 21's Destroyer Division 41 (DesDiv 41), one of two four-destroyer divisions screening Rear Admiral Robert C. Giffen's Task Force 18, comprising three heavy cruisers, three light cruisers, and two escort carriers.

On 27 January, Taylor cleared Havannah Harbor with the other ships of TF 18, one of several task forces sent out to screen an important reinforcement echelon to Guadalcanal. Admiral William Halsey, operating upon intelligence which indicated a major Japanese attempt to reinforce their beleaguered garrison on the island, sent out the large screening force in the hope and expectation of a major naval engagement. That sea battle never materialized because the enemy activities upon which he predicated his actions were actually movements preparatory to a Japanese withdrawal. Instead, at the battle of Rennell Island, the enemy subjected TF 18 to a scathing air attack. On the evening of 29 January, enemy Mitsubishi G4M "Betty" bombers attacked TF 18 with torpedoes. The ships brushed off the first attack with antiaircraft fire, suffered negligible damage, and raced on to rendezvous with the other elements of the covering force. After a concerted effort, the Japanese fliers finally scored a crippling torpedo hit on Chicago (CA-29). When Louisville (CA-28) took the stricken cruiser in tow, Taylor helped to screen the retiring ships as they steamed out of range of enemy aircraft. The following day, more enemy planes appeared and attacked. After Chicago took four more torpedo hits, her crew and the warships covering her abandoned the heavy cruiser to her watery fate and returned to Efate.

=== Feb. – April 1943 ===
On 4 February, Taylor and the other ships of DesRon 21 were transferred to TF 67, Rear Admiral Walden L. Ainsworth's cruiser-destroyer force. Soon thereafter, TF 67 became TF 18, and the former TF 18 became TF 19. In any event, during February and March, Taylor screened Ainsworth's cruisers—St. Louis (CL-49), Honolulu (CL-48), and Helena (CL-50)—during operations between Espiritu Santo and Guadalcanal. During the night of 15–16 March, she joined Nicholas (DD-449), Radford (DD-446), and Strong (DD-467) in the fourth bombardment of the Vila-Stanmore Plantation located on Kolombangara Island in the central Solomon Islands. On 26 March, the destroyer cleared Espiritu Santo to escort Kanawha (AO-1), Aloe (YN-1), and six coastal transports to Guadalcanal. The ships reached Tulagi on the 29th; and, while Kanawha discharged cargo, Taylor resumed operations at sea with Ainsworth's cruisers.

On the nights of 4, 5, and 6 April, she joined them in sweeps up "the Slot" before being ordered back to Tulagi on the 7th to pick up Kanawha. When the destroyer was just about to enter Tulagi, a strong Japanese air raid cancelled her mission by severely bombing Kanawha before the old oiler could clear the harbor completely. With Kanawha disabled, Taylor rang up 30 knots and cleared the area via Sealark Channel. During her transit of the channel, the warship claimed the destruction of three enemy planes and hits on two others.

For much of the month, Taylor escorted convoys in the Solomons and between those islands and Espiritu Santo. On 20 April, she rejoined TF 18. After a brief tender overhaul, the destroyer accompanied the cruisers up the "Slot" twice during the 10 days between 4 and 14 May to cover mining operations in Vella Gulf. During the second operation, conducted between the 11th and the 14th, she and the other warships bombarded enemy installations at Vila, Bairoko Harbor, and Enogai Inlet.

=== May – July 1943 ===
Between late May and early July, Taylor performed escort duty. On 25 May, she cleared Espiritu Santo with Munargo (AP-20), escorted the transport to the 180th meridian, and returned to Espiritu Santo on the 30th. During her next assignment—escorting a convoy of troop transports to Guadalcanal and back—she defended her charges against Japanese planes which jumped the task unit on 10 June south of San Cristobal. After repairs at Espiritu Santo, she served with the antisubmarine screen of escort carrier Sangamon (ACV-26) until 6 July when she headed for Tulagi to report for duty with TF 31.

For the next four months, Taylor supported the invasions of the central Solomons. In July, she supported the New Georgia landings. On the 11th and 12th, the destroyer covered the landing of troops and supplies at Rice Anchorage on Kula Gulf as well as the evacuation of wounded. On the morning of the 12th, she attacked and damaged a Japanese Ro-type submarine, but could claim no definite sinking. That afternoon, Taylor was temporarily detached from TF 31 and assigned to TF 18. She headed up the "Slot" with Ainsworth's cruisers—the same ones with which she had previously served except that HMNZS Leander replaced Helena after the latter cruiser was lost in the Battle of Kula Gulf—to intercept a Japanese surface force. That evening, the two forces collided. Taylor and the other van destroyers launched torpedoes and then joined the remainder of TF 18 in engaging the enemy with their guns. It may well have been one of Taylor's "fish" that slammed into the Japanese cruiser Jintsu's hull just abaft her number 2 stack and ripped her in half. There is no way of knowing for sure, but the accumulated effect of the destroyer's torpedoes and the entire task force's gunfire cost the enemy his flagship and his commander, Rear Admiral Shunji Izaki.

Following the Battle of Kolombangara, Taylor reported back to TF 31 and resumed support for the amphibious operations in the central Solomons. On the night of 15–16 July, the destroyer took Helena survivors off Vella Lavella Island where they had found refuge after their ship went down. Almost a week later, on the night of 23–24 July, the destroyer supported the landings at Enogai Inlet and participated in another bombardment of Bairoko Harbor. The following morning, her main battery joined in a bombardment of the Japanese positions around the Munda area of New Georgia.

=== Aug. – Sept. 1943 ===
On 30 July, Taylor cleared Guadalcanal in company with a troop transport convoy bound for New Caledonia. She was detached en route to Nouméa and ordered to join TF 37 at Efate. On 11 August, Nicholas, O'Bannon (DD-450), Chevalier (DD-451), and Taylor were ordered to return to Guadalcanal and rejoin TF 31 for the Vella Lavella phase of the central Solomons operation. First, she covered the landings on 15 August. Two days later, the same four destroyers were ordered out of the anchorage at Purvis Bay to intercept a force of troop-laden barges covered by four destroyers. During the ensuing action off Horaniu, a mad melee of torpedoes and gunfire, neither side lost a destroyer; but the Japanese suffered some damage when American shells set Hamakaze ablaze. Later, after the enemy destroyers had made good their escape, the Americans turned their attention to the scattered barges and combat craft, sinking two subchasers (Cha-5 and Cha-12), an equal number of torpedo boats, and one barge before retiring. Forty-eight hours later, the four American destroyers returned once again to the area northwest of Vella Lavella to seek out enemy barge traffic. They encountered nothing except enemy aircraft and dodged heavy bombing attacks throughout the evening. Over the next nine days, Taylor and her division mates made eight more trips up the "Slot"—one of which was to cover mining operations off the west coast of Kolombangara—but saw little or no action.

Taylor departed Guadalcanal and the Solomons on 28 August to escort Titania (AKA-13) to Nouméa. Then—after a ten-day repair, rest, and relaxation period in Sydney, Australia—the destroyer escorted a troop transport convoy from Nouméa to Guadalcanal. She returned to the Tulagi-Purvis Bay area on 30 September and resumed support of the subjugation of Vella Lavella. By this time, the Japanese had already begun to evacuate bypassed Kolombangara and would soon make the decision to do the same at Vella Lavella. Thus, Taylor and other destroyers continued their nocturnal forays up the "Slot" to interdict barge traffic.

=== Vella Lavella, Oct. 1943 ===
On the night of 2 October, she, Terry (DD-513), and Ralph Talbot (DD-390) engaged enemy barges and a surface force in the waters between Choiseul and Kolombangara. Four nights later came the big action of the Vella Lavella and Kolombangara evacuations, the Battle of Vella Lavella. While south of New Georgia escorting a convoy, Taylor, Ralph Talbot, and La Valette (DD-448) were ordered to join O'Bannon, Chevalier, and Selfridge already embroiled in a slugfest with nine Japanese destroyers covering the Vella Lavella evacuation group. During the ensuing battle, the American and Japanese forces traded torpedo salvoes and gunfire, as well as exchanged destroyer Chevalier for Yūgumo. During the battle, Selfridge also received a torpedo hit and O'Bannon ran into Chevalier's stern, but neither was lost. Taylor went alongside Selfridge in the closing moments of the battle and evacuated most of her crew while a skeleton crew began their successful attempt to save the damaged destroyer. She then screened the two cripples while they limped back down the "Slot" to Purvis Bay.

On 17 October, Taylor departed the southern Solomons with the other members of DesDiv 41. She and her consorts escorted a convoy of troop transports to Efate, where they reported for duty with TF 37. Between 23 and 26 October, she made a round-trip voyage between Efate and Nouméa, escorting Lassen (AE-3) to Nouméa and Aldebaran (AF-10) to Efate.

=== Nov. – Dec. 1943 ===
Taylor and her division were reassigned to the Central Pacific Force on 31 October in preparation for the first step in the Navy's central Pacific thrust, the seizure and occupation of the Gilbert Islands. For that operation, she was assigned to the screen of TG 50.1, built around carriers USS Lexington (CV-16), USS Yorktown (CV-10) and USS Cowpens (CVL-25). She screened TG 50.1 during the raids on Jaluit and Mili in the Marshalls conducted during the first half of November in preparation for the Gilberts assault. During the actual landings and occupations, she protected her charges from enemy aircraft and submarines while their planes took off to help those of the escort carriers maintain air supremacy over the islands. Following the Gilberts operation, she steamed with the carriers during raids on the Marshall Islands. Near the end of those forays, she teamed up with La Vallette and USS San Francisco (CA-38) to splash two of four enemy Nakajima B5N "Kates" which attacked the task group just after noon on 4 December.

=== Feb. – May 1944 ===
Following those raids, Taylor was ordered back to the United States for extensive yard work, arriving in San Francisco on 16 December. Repairs completed, she put to sea on 1 February 1944 and headed back to the western Pacific via Pearl Harbor. She reached Kwajalein in the Marshalls on 18 February. Taylor escorted one convoy to Eniwetok Atoll where she joined the screen of carriers Coral Sea (CVE-57) and Corregidor (CVE-58) on 29 February. The task unit cleared Eniwetok on 29 February and headed for Pearl Harbor, where it arrived on 3 March. After 12 days of training operations and repairs, the destroyer departed Pearl Harbor in the screen of Sangamon (CVE-26), Suwannee (CVE-27), Chenango (CVE-28), and Santee (CVE-29), and arrived in Purvis Bay near Guadalcanal on the 27th. She remained there until 5 April when she left for Milne Bay, New Guinea, for temporary duty with the 7th Fleet.

The warship reached Milne Bay on 7 April and, the following day, headed on to Cape Sudest, where she became a unit of TF 77 for the amphibious assault at Humboldt Bay. During the assault, she screened aircraft carriers and acted as fighter director until 24 April when she departed to escort a convoy back to Cape Sudest. From there she moved to Morobe Bay, where she spent the remainder of the month in availability alongside Dobbin (AD-3). During the first week in May, Taylor escorted a convoy from Cape Cretin to the Hollandia invasion area and acted as fighter director ship once more. She returned to Cape Cretin on 7 May and departed again two days later to screen a convoy of LSTs to the Russell Islands subgroup in the Solomons. On 13 May, the destroyer reported back to the 3d Fleet in the Solomons, dropped off the convoy, and departed again to screen another convoy to New Caledonia.

=== May – Aug. 1944 ===
On 24 May, she stood out of Nouméa in company with DesDiv 41 to return to the Solomons and arrived at her new base of operations, Blanche Harbor, on 27 May. Taylor operated out of that port in the northern Solomons and Bismarcks area until early August. On the night of 28–29 May, she patrolled off Medina Plantation on New Ireland while her sister ships bombarded the area to neutralize mobile coastal guns. From 1 to 6 June, she operated with DesDiv 41 conducting antisubmarine operations. During the week from 7 to 14 June, Taylor and the other ships of DesDiv 41 joined TG 30.4 for hunter-killer antisubmarine operations. On the 10th, she depth-charged an enemy submarine, forced it to the surface, and damaged it heavily with 5 inch and 40-mm fire. The submarine submerged again, and Taylor made two more depth charge runs and netted a probable kill. She returned to Blanche Harbor on the 15th and operated in that vicinity until the first week in August.

On 5 August, she changed operational command from the 3d Fleet to the 7th Fleet. She began her duty with that fleet with a practice bombardment of the Aitape area of New Guinea late in August and a practice landing at Moffin Bay conducted on 6 September. Both operations were in preparation for the landings made on the island of Morotai in the Netherlands East Indies on 15 September. For the remainder of the month, she acted as fighter director ship and as a unit of the invasion force's antisubmarine and antiaircraft screen. The destroyer also escorted convoys to the landing area until mid-October.

=== Oct. – Dec. 1944 ===
Between 18 and 24 October, Taylor was a unit of the screen for the second reinforcement echelon for the Leyte invasion. During a Japanese aerial assault on the 24th, the destroyer laid a smoke screen to protect the convoy. That night, as the Battle of Surigao Strait opened, Taylor and the other destroyers of her division were anchored near the entrance of San Pedro Bay. Though she did not actually join the surface engagement, Taylor joined the support force on the following morning. Following that, she patrolled the vicinity of Dinagat Island with a unit known as the "torpedo attack force". On 27 and 28 October, the warship screened TG 77.4, the escort carrier group. During that duty, she rescued a downed fighter pilot of Enterprise (CV-6) and a seaman from Petrof Bay (CVE-80). Frequently, she helped fend off Japanese air attacks.

On 29 October, she joined TG 77.2 and departed the area of Leyte Gulf. After visits to Seeadler Harbor, Ulithi Atoll, and Kossol Roads, she returned to Leyte Gulf on 16 November. Between 16 and 29 November, the destroyer continued to screen TG 77.2 and to patrol the eastern entrance to the Surigao Strait. Again, she joined her sister ships in beating off heavy enemy air raids, climaxed by a large attack of kamikaze suicide planes and dive bombers on the 29th. She claimed one sure kill and two assists during those raids. Taylor then cleared Leyte Gulf for almost a month at Seeadler Harbor before returning to Leyte on 28 December to prepare for the invasion of Luzon.

=== Jan. – June 1945 ===
Taylor departed Leyte Gulf on 4 January 1945 in the screen for the cruisers in the covering force. The next day, the destroyer sighted two torpedoes running toward her formation. After giving the submarine alarm, Taylor launched a depth-charge attack on the enemy submarine—a midget. Following those attacks, she rammed the small submarine and sent it on its last dive. During the Allied approach to Lingayen Gulf and in the days following the landings, the Japanese subjected Taylor and her sister ships to a series of heavy air raids. Taylor's antiaircraft gunners assisted in splashing at least two of the attackers. Through the end of January, the warship screened the cruisers and the escort carriers on patrol west of Luzon.

From early February through mid-June 1945, Taylor operated out of Subic Bay in the Philippines. Between 13 and 18 February, she participated in an extensive bombardment of Corregidor and of the Mariveles Bay area of Luzon to support minesweeping operations and to pave the way for an assault by airborne troops. Early in March, she supported the recapture of Zamboanga on Mindanao during which the destroyer's guns helped reduce enemy shore installations. She also covered the minesweepers while they cleared the way for the invasion force. On 15 March, Taylor returned to Corregidor, where she bombarded caves on the island's western cliffs. On 26 March, the ship participated in the amphibious assault on Cebu Island, where she joined Boise (CL-47), Phoenix (CL-46), Fletcher (DD-445), Nicholas, Jenkins (DD-447), and Abbot (DD-629) in laying down a heavy pre-landing bombardment.

After a short two-day sightseeing visit to Manila, Taylor cleared the Philippines with Boise, Phoenix, two Australian warships, and four other American destroyers to support the amphibious landings in northeastern Borneo. En route, she captured five Japanese who were attempting to escape from Tawi Tawi on a raft. On 27 April, Taylor and her sister ships reached the vicinity of the invasion—Tarakan, a small island located just off the eastern coast of Borneo and north of Makassar Strait. She operated in that area until 3 May and delivered a preinvasion bombardment and call fire. On 3 May, two days after the actual landings, she departed Tarakan to resume duty in the Philippines, where for the remainder of the month she conducted training operations.

=== June – Nov. 1945 ===
In mid-June, Taylor rejoined the 3d Fleet at Leyte Gulf and, for the remainder of the war, screened various units of that fleet. During the latter part of the month, she screened aircraft carriers operating south of Okinawa which conducted air strikes on Sakishima Gunto. On 25 June, she returned to Leyte Gulf and remained there until 8 July, when she departed in the screen of TG 30.8, the logistics group for the fast carriers of TF 38. The destroyer operated with TG 30.8 off Honshū until 3 August when she joined the screen of one of the fast carrier task groups, TG 38.4. On 8 August, she resumed duty with the logistics group for five days. On the 13th, Taylor rejoined TG 38.4 just in time to be a part of the last offensive actions directed at Japan.

Following the cessation of hostilities on 15 August, she patrolled off Honshū with the fast carriers. Admiral William Halsey, commander of the 3rd Fleet ordered that the destroyers from DesRon 21 be present in Tokyo Bay for Japan's surrender "because of their valorous fight up the long road from the South Pacific to the very end." On 23 August, Taylor and her old sisters Nicholas and O'Bannon formed the screen of Missouri (BB-63), and as such she was one of the first American warships to enter Tokyo Bay, arriving on 29 August. The destroyer was present at the surrender ceremony conducted on board Missouri on 2 September and carried Allied war correspondents to and from the ceremony. She operated in the Far East when she departed Tokyo Bay. On 7 October, she docked at Okinawa and picked up troops returning to the United States. On 18 October the Taylor dropped off her passengers at Portland, Oregon and arrived in San Francisco on 1 November and began preparations for inactivation. On 31 May 1946, the destroyer was decommissioned and placed in reserve at San Diego.

== 1951 – 1953 ==
After four years of inactivity, Taylor moved to the San Francisco Naval Shipyard on 9 May 1950 and, three days later, began an extensive conversion to an escort destroyer. While still completing conversion, she was officially redesignated DDE-468 on 2 January 1951. On 3 December 1951, Taylor was recommissioned at San Francisco, with Comdr. Sheldon H. Kinney in command. On 3 February 1952, she put to sea for a two-month shakedown period off San Diego. On 24 March, the escort destroyer headed west to her new home port, Pearl Harbor, and arrived there on the 30th. Following two months in the Hawaiian Islands, Taylor set out to return to the western Pacific for the first time since World War II. She stopped at Midway Atoll and Yokosuka, Japan, before joining TF 77 on 16 June to screen the carriers during air operations off the Korean coast.

During the five months that she spent in the Far East, Taylor drew several different assignments. Initially, she operated with the fast carriers and conducted bombardments of enemy-held positions along the coasts of Korea. During the second week in July, she returned to Yokosuka for upkeep and then went to sea again for exercises which included several weeks of hunter-killer operations. On 1 August, the escort destroyer rejoined TF 77 and, in September, stood blockade watch off Wonsan for three weeks. Her blockade duty at Wonsan was far from passive for, on numerous occasions, she was called upon to shell enemy shore batteries and lines of transportation and to screen minesweepers during daily sweeps of the harbor. Late that month, Taylor headed south for a tour of duty on the Taiwan Strait Patrol during which she made a weekend port call at Hong Kong. In late October, the escort destroyer returned north to the western coast of Korea where she patrolled with two British warships, the carrier HMS Glory (R62) and the cruiser HMS Birmingham (C19). On 21 November, Taylor returned to Yokosuka, completing the first leg of her voyage home.

After conducting patrols in the western Pacific while en route to Hawaii, Taylor entered Pearl Harbor on 8 December. Following a month of leave and upkeep, she entered the Pearl Harbor Naval Shipyard for a month of repairs. For the next three months, she conducted shakedown training in the Hawaiian Islands in order to integrate her replacements with the rest of the crew. On 2 May 1953, the warship exited Pearl Harbor to deploy to the western Pacific again. She reached Yokosuka on 12 May and, after visiting that port and Sasebo, put to sea to join a carrier task group built around USS Bairoko (CVE-115) and HMS Ocean (R68) off the western coast of Korea. For the most part, she screened the carriers during air operations; however, on two occasions, she patrolled close to the enemy-held shoreline to discourage the North Koreans from attempting to take offshore islands held by United Nations forces. She returned to Sasebo on 1 June for 11 days of upkeep before heading for Okinawa and two weeks of antisubmarine warfare (ASW) training. On 25 June, Taylor returned to Japan at Yokosuka, but she departed again almost immediately for duty with the Taiwan Strait Patrol. During that assignment, she visited Hong Kong once again as well as Kaohsiung, where she trained sailors of the Republic of China Navy. The escort destroyer returned to Yokosuka on 20 July and, after two days of voyage repairs, departed the Far East. She arrived in Pearl Harbor on 31 July and, the following day, entered the naval shipyard there for a three-month overhaul.

Taylor's return to Pearl Harbor coincided very closely with the formal end to hostilities in Korea. The armistice came on 27 July 1953 when she had just passed the midpoint of her voyage—five days out of Yokosuka and four days from Pearl Harbor. While she saw some action during her two Korean War deployments, they occurred during the relatively quiet, final two years of the conflict. Her subsequent deployments, while they included both duty off Korea and on the Taiwan Strait Patrol, were entirely peaceful in nature until the expansion of the American role in the Vietnamese civil war in 1965.

== 1954 – 1962 ==
In the five years between 1 March 1954 and 1 March 1959, Taylor completed five more deployments to the western Pacific. During each, she conducted training exercises and made goodwill visits to Far Eastern ports. When not in the Orient, she conducted normal operations out of Pearl Harbor. During her sixth post-Korean War deployment in 1959 and 1960, she visited Australia for the celebration commemorating the victory at the Battle of the Coral Sea in May 1942. Upon her return to Pearl Harbor on 26 May 1960, the escort destroyer conducted normal operations again until December when she entered the Pearl Harbor Naval Shipyard for a major overhaul before deploying to the western Pacific again in August 1961. In lieu of her annual western Pacific deployment, Taylor spent the spring and summer of 1962 in the mid-Pacific as one of the support units for Operation Dominic, nuclear tests conducted in the upper atmosphere. In October, she returned to Hawaii to begin a repair period which saw her through the end of 1962. During that year, she reverted to the classification of destroyer and was re-designated DD-468 on 7 August 1962.

== 1962 – 1965 ==
Local operations in the Hawaiian Islands occupied the remainder of 1962 and the first six months of 1963. On 4 June 1963, the destroyer stood out of Pearl Harbor with a hunter/killer group bound for duty with the 7th Fleet. During this deployment to the Far East, Taylor called at Kobe, Japan; Hong Kong; Okinawa; and Kushiro as well as the base ports of Yokosuka, Sasebo, and Subic Bay. The call at Kushiro—a fishing port on Hokkaidō, the northernmost of the Japanese home islands—constituted Taylor's contributions to the People to People Program and aided in developing greater understanding between the peoples of the United States and Japan. Other than that, the warship engaged in numerous unilateral and bilateral training exercises through the remainder of the cruise which ended at Pearl Harbor on 29 November. Taylor operated locally in Hawaii until April 1964 when she entered drydock for a three-month overhaul. In July she resumed operations in Hawaiian waters.

Those operations continued throughout most of the fall of 1964. On 23 November, the destroyer cleared Pearl Harbor in company with Yorktown (CVS-10) and Thomason (DD-746) to return to the Orient. The task unit steamed via Midway Atoll and, on 3 December, made port at Yokosuka, Japan. Four days later, she put to sea for two weeks of combined antiaircraft/ antisubmarine warfare exercises conducted with Hancock (CVA-19) and Strauss (DDG-16) near Okinawa. On 19 December, the warship returned to Japan at Sasebo and remained there through the holidays and into the New Year.

On 4 January 1965, Taylor cleared Sasebo and rejoined Yorktown and Thomason for a voyage to Hong Kong. The three ships remained in the British Crown Colony for five days before clearing port for a series of special operations conducted in the Philippine Sea. At the conclusion of that duty, she put into Subic Bay on 24 February. After four days in the Philippines, Taylor headed back to Sasebo, where she arrived on 3 March. Exactly two weeks later, the destroyer got underway for the western portion of the South China Sea. She arrived off the coast of Vietnam on 21 March and patrolled there for the following five weeks. On 27 April, Taylor headed back to Yokosuka for a brief stop—from 3 to 6 May—before returning to Hawaii. The destroyer reentered Pearl Harbor on the 13th and conducted local operations in Hawaiian waters. On 6 December, Taylor entered the drydock for another overhaul.

== 1965 – 1967 ==
The destroyer left the dock in mid-January 1965 and stood out of Pearl Harbor on 7 February and, with the other ships of DesDiv 111, shaped a course for the western Pacific. The warship reached Yokosuka 10 days later and spent eight days undergoing voyage repairs. On 25 February, she departed Yokosuka to join Task Group 70.4 off the coast of Vietnam the following day. She patrolled Vietnamese waters until the Ides of March, when she headed north to patrol the Taiwan Strait. During her stay in the area around Taiwan, she visited Kaohsiung. Her relief arrived on 12 April, and Taylor steamed off to Hong Kong for a five-day port call. On the 21st, she returned to Yankee Station to resume operations in support of American and South Vietnamese forces ashore. Among other tasks, she brought her main battery to bear on the enemy and rendered naval gunfire support between 28 April and 1 May. She conducted upkeep at Sasebo in May and ASW drills from 26 May to 10 June before resuming patrols in the Taiwan Strait on the 11th ( during operation Sand Pan she started to tie up at Da Nang then incoming we quickly pulled away and were request to render gun fire on co-ordnance given one shot hit objective then we sail north for more Sand Pan duty). She cleared the area again on 5 July, rejoined TG 70.4 on 7 July, and put into Yokosuka the following day. After a week of preparations, the warship departed Yokosuka to return to Pearl Harbor, where she arrived on 22 July.

On 2 August 1965, Taylor began a tender availability period alongside Prairie (AD-15) which lasted through the end of the month. Following a short cruise for gunnery practice, Taylor commenced a restricted availability which lasted until late in November. During the first two weeks in December, the destroyer made a round-trip voyage to Pago Pago, American Samoa. She returned to Pearl Harbor on 16 December for holiday leave and upkeep. During the first three months of 1967, the ship conducted local operations around Hawaii, made repairs, and generally prepared to return to the Far East in late spring.

Following an Operational Readiness Inspection in mid-April, she cleared Pearl Harbor on the 18th to join the 7th Fleet in the Orient. On 25 April, she changed operational control from the 1st Fleet to the 7th and, three days later, steamed into Yokosuka. During the first half of June, the destroyer participated in exercises with units of the Japan Maritime Self-Defense Force and ships of the Republic of Korea Navy. After two days in port at Sasebo, she got underway on 19 June for her first line period on Yankee Station. Between 22 May and 25 June, she plied the waters of the Gulf of Tonkin, plane-guarding for Hornet (CV-12) and providing gunfire support for Allied forces operating ashore. On 27 June, Taylor put into Subic Bay. After a tender availability at Subic Bay and a visit to Manila, she put to sea on 10 July to participate in SEATO exercise "Sea Dog." Between the 26th and the 28th, she visited Bang Saen on the Gulf of Thailand. After three more days on Yankee Station—from 28 July to 1 August— the destroyer made for Taiwan. She reached Kaohsiung on 3 August and remained until 15 August, when she headed back to the coast of Vietnam, Yankee Station sand pan operation. From 19 August to 11 September, she cruised along the Vietnamese coast providing naval gunfire support as needed by the forces operating ashore. She cleared the coast of Indochina on the 12th, and, after a five-day stop at Hong Kong and another tour of duty in the Gulf of Tonkin, she returned to Yokosuka on 11 October. Five days later, she shaped a course back to Hawaii.

== 1968 – 1969 ==
Taylor arrived in Pearl Harbor on 23 October, and the destroyer commenced her regular overhaul on 11 December. Repairs and modifications occupied her time through the first three months of 1968. The warship completed overhaul on 22 March and conducted sea trials during the first week in April. Later, engineering problems forced the postponement of further operations until the end of the month. At that time, she began preparations for refresher training. The warship conducted refresher training in May and June, then got underway for San Diego, Calif., on 27 June. She conducted operations—primarily gunnery drills at San Clemente Island—from 3 to 11 July. On the latter date, she headed back to Hawaii. En route, Taylor conducted bombardment exercises at Kahoʻolawe Island and then entered Pearl Harbor on the 17th. Three weeks later, the destroyer cleared Pearl Harbor on 5 August and set course for the Gulf of Tonkin.

After fueling stops at Midway, Guam, and Subic Bay, she arrived on station off Vietnam on 21 August. Taylor did plane guard duty for Intrepid (CVS-11) for a day; then steamed off with the carrier and destroyers Maddox (DD-731) and Preston (DD-795) toward Sasebo. She returned to the Gulf of Tonkin on 5 September and conducted air and surface surveillance as well as antisubmarine warfare exercises in addition to planeguarding for the carriers. On the 19th, the destroyer moved in closer to the coast to provide naval gunfire in support of troops ashore. That duty continued until 6 October when she cleared the combat zone to return to Subic Bay for repairs, supplies, and ammunition. On 20 October, the warship took up where she left off and began a week pounding various targets in Vietnam. That line period was followed by visits to Cebu City and Subic Bay in the Philippines. During late November and early December, she resumed duty on the gunline. On 4 December, she cleared the combat zone and set a course through the Luzon Strait to Yokosuka, where she arrived on the 12th. She spent Christmas in Yokosuka, but returned to Yankee Station by New Year's Day 1969.

In mid-January, she departed Vietnamese waters for the last time. After stops at Subic Bay; Manus Island; Melbourne, Australia; Auckland, New Zealand; and Pago Pago, Samoa, the warship arrived back in Pearl Harbor on 28 February. In May, a board of inspection and survey looked her over and determined that she was unfit for further naval service. Early in June, Taylor was moved to San Diego, California, and was decommissioned on 3 June 1969. Her name was struck from the Navy list on 2 July 1969.

== Lanciere (D 560) ==
She was transferred to the Italian Navy the same year as Lanciere D 560 until January 1971. She was subsequently cannibalized to maintain her sister ships still serving in the Italian Navy.

== Honors ==
Taylor earned a Navy Unit Commendation and 14 battle stars during World War II. In addition, she earned two battle stars for her Korean War service, and five battle stars for her Vietnam War service.

== See also ==
See USS Taylor for other ships of the same name.
