= Battle of Vella Lavella =

The name Battle of Vella Lavella may refer to three related battles between the Allies and Japan in the Solomon Islands in 1943, during the Pacific campaign of World War II.

- The Battle of Vella Gulf: a naval battle that took place on the night of August 6–7, 1943.
- The Battle of Vella Lavella (land): the US and New Zealand ground campaign to secure the island from August 15 to October 9, 1943.
- The Battle of Vella Lavella (naval): a naval battle that took place on October 6, 1943, during the Japanese evacuation of Vella Lavella.
