= USS Taylor =

USS Taylor may refer to:

- USS Taylor (DD-94) was a Wickes-class destroyer from 1918 to 1938
- USS Taylor (DD-468) was a Fletcher-class destroyer 1942 to 1969, and later transferred to the Italian Navy as Lanciere (D-560)
- USS Taylor (FFG-50) was an Oliver Hazard Perry-class frigate in service from 1984 to 2015.

== See also ==
- USS David W. Taylor (DD-551)
- USS Lawrence C. Taylor (DE-415)
- SS President Taylor
