= USS O'Bannon (DD-450) =

Fletcher-class destroyer

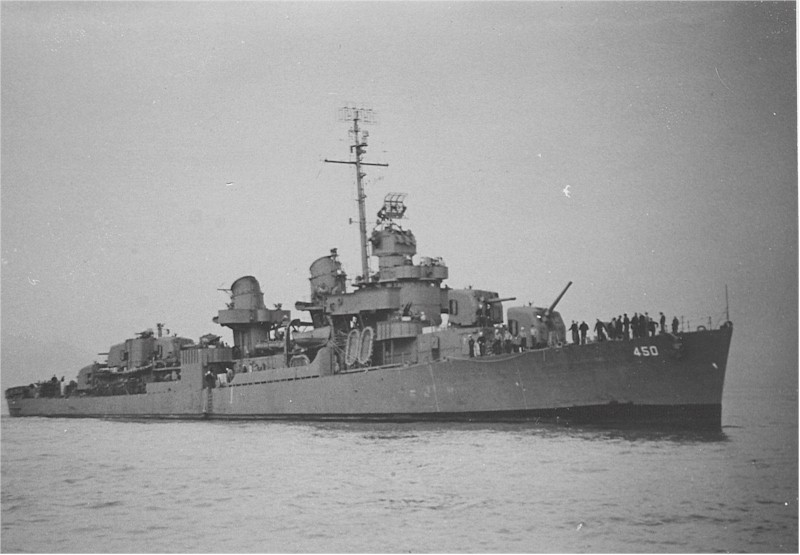
- O'Bannon off Mare Island on 8 January 1944

History

United States
- Name: O'Bannon
- Namesake: First lieutenant Presley O'Bannon
- Builder: Bath Iron Works
- Laid down: 3 March 1941
- Launched: 14 March 1942
- Commissioned: 26 June 1942
- Decommissioned: 30 January 1970
- Stricken: 30 January 1970
- Honors and awards: Presidential Unit Citation
- Fate: Sold for scrap, 6 June 1970

General characteristics
- Class & type: Fletcher-class destroyer
- Displacement: 2,050 tons
- Length: 376 ft 6 in (114.7 m)
- Beam: 39 ft 8 in (12.1 m)
- Draft: 17 ft 9 in (5.4 m)
- Propulsion: 60,000 shp (45 MW); 2 propellers
- Speed: 35 knots (65 km/h; 40 mph)
- Range: 6500 nmi. (12,000 km) at 15 kt
- Complement: 329
- Armament: July 1942-October 1943; 5 x 5"/38 caliber guns (5x1); 1 x 1.1"/75 caliber gun (1x4); 10 x 21-inch torpedo tubes for Mark 15 torpedoes; February 1944-; 5 x 5"/38 caliber guns (5x1); 10 x Bofors 40 mm L/60 gun (5x2); 10 x 21-inch torpedo tubes for Mark 15 torpedoes

USS O'Bannon (DD/DDE-450), a Fletcher-class destroyer, was the second ship of the United States Navy to be named after Lieutenant Presley O'Bannon (1784–1850), the Marine Corps's "hero of Derna".

O'Bannon was the US Navy's most decorated destroyer during World War II, earning 17 battle stars and a Presidential Unit Citation. First serving in the naval battle of Guadalcanal, where she helped to sink the Japanese destroyer Akatsuki and shelled the battleship Hiei. With the start of 1943, O'Bannon helped to sink the submarines I-18 and Ro-34, scoring fame for throwing potatoes at the latter, before moving on to the Solomon Islands campaign, fighting in the battles of Kula Gulf, Kolombangara, and Horaniu, sinking several small Japanese vessels. During the battle of Vella Lavella, O'Bannon helped to sink the destroyer Yūgumo, but collided with the sinking destroyer USS Chevalier and was badly damaged herself, taking her out of action for several months. However, she was ready for action by March 1944, and led the rest of her WW2 service conducting shore bombardment and escorting duties, with a pump of excitement in January 1945 when she helped to sink the Japanese submarine Ro-115.

After the war, O'Bannon was converted into a destroyer escort, and took on patrol and shore bombardment duties during the Korean War and Vietnam War.

== Construction and commissioning ==
O'Bannon was laid down by Bath Iron Works Corp. in Bath, Maine on 3 March 1941, and launched 14 March 1942, sponsored by Mrs. E. F. Kennedy, descendant of Lieutenant O'Bannon. O'Bannon and her sister ship Nicholas (DD-449) were the first two Fletchers to be launched. O'Bannon was commissioned at Boston on 26 June 1942.

== 1942 ==
O'Bannon trained for war in the Caribbean and sailed from Boston on 29 August 1942 for the Southwest Pacific, where the Guadalcanal campaign had just begun. For over a year, the Navy—stretched to cover its worldwide commitments at a period when new ships were just beginning to join the fleet in any number—fought in the Solomon Islands in one of the most contested campaigns of history. Taking air and sea control from the Japanese and providing the Marine Corps and the Army with every possible support as they gained ground on the islands. Assigned the Destroyer Squadron 21 (DesRon 21), O'Bannon played an important part in these endeavors, winning a Presidential Unit Citation.

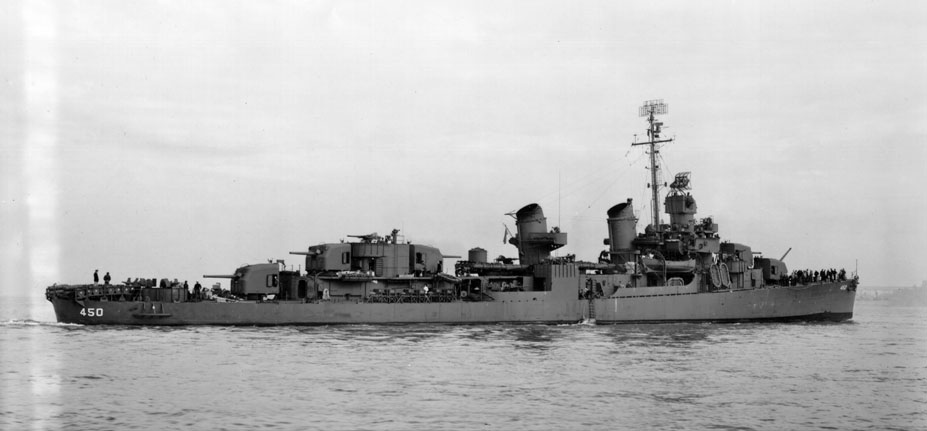
O'Bannon shortly after commissioning

Based at Nouméa, New Caledonia, O'Bannon first escorted the escort carrier Copahee on a run to Guadalcanal, where on 9 October, twenty Marines flew their Grumman F4F Wildcats off Copahee's decks, desperately needed as reinforcements at beleaguered Henderson Field. Through the remainder of the month, O'Bannon sailed the New Hebrides and southern Solomons on escort duty. On 7 November at Nouméa, she joined Rear Admiral Daniel J. Callaghan's Support Group, ready to sail with a convoy carrying critical reinforcements, replacements, food, ammunition, and aviation material.

On the approach to Guadalcanal, O'Bannon sighted and fired on a surfaced enemy submarine, holding it down while the convoy passed safely. On the afternoon of 12 November, the partially unladen transports were attacked by sixteen enemy torpedo bombers; eleven were shot down. O'Bannon fired on four of the enemy planes.

=== Naval battle of Guadalcanal ===
Now came word that the Japanese were moving south in force. Two battleships, a light cruiser, and 14 destroyers were bound to destroy Henderson Field by bombardment, to break up the American reinforcement mission, and to cover reinforcement movements of their own. O'Bannon and the other ships of the Support Force, two heavy and three light cruisers and eight destroyers, confronted the greatly superior enemy early on 13 November in Ironbottom Sound, so named for the number of ships on both sides sunk there during the Guadalcanal campaign. O'Bannon first attacked the Japanese destroyer Akatsuki after the tin can illuminated her searchlights, which was the target of multiple other American warships. Completely blasted into a pulp by 5-inch, 6-inch, and 8-inch gunfire, shell hits destroyed Akatsuki's starboard engine, then tore apart the bulkheads protecting her port engine and flooding the ship's last means of movement, before destroying the rudder and steering gear as well. Left adrift and devoured by flames, Akatsuki finally blew up and sank within a few minutes with the loss of all but 19 men.

After claiming her first kill on an enemy vessel, O'Bannon with the destroyers USS Cushing, Laffey, and Sterett closed to point blank range from the Japanese battleship Hiei, closing so near, the battleship could not depress her main battery far enough to fire on them. However, Cushing as the lead American destroyer took the brunt of the counter fire; the light cruiser Nagara and the destroyers Yukikaze and Harusame blasted Cushing into a pulp, but left the others untargeted as O'Bannon began to blast Hiei with gunfire, scoring multiple hits which set the battleship on fire. Laffey found herself as close as 20 feet from Hiei and scored hits which wounded admiral Abe and killed his chief of staff, before O'Bannon and Sterett further pumped Hiei full of lead and fired their torpedoes, although none managed to arm.

Suddenly, Nagara and Yukikaze pounced on Laffey; Yukikaze hit Laffey with a torpedo which blew off her fantail and propellers, broke her keel, destroyed all electrical power, and started a massive fire which spread to and detonated Laffey's turret 4 magazines, sinking the destroyer in two minutes. O'Bannon swerved pass the sinking Laffey, and dropped some 50 lifejackets overboard to assist the survivors in the water, but that was when Yukikaze took O'Bannon under fire and after a brief exchange she was forced to swerve away, taking no direct Japanese shell hits but near misses exploded underneath her keel and disrupted her lighting and power.

This first engagement of the Naval Battle of Guadalcanal was short but furious; two American light cruisers (Atlanta and Juneau), in one of which Rear Admiral Norman Scott lost his life, and four destroyers (Cushing, Laffey, Barton, Monssen) were lost, while two Japanese destroyers (Akatsuki ,Yūdachi) were sunk, and Hiei prepared for her doom. Above all, the Japanese were turned back, and Henderson Field was saved from destruction. The importance of this success is illustrated by the fact that the next day, Henderson aviators sank seven enemy troop transports attempting to reinforce the island and turned back four more transports that were destroyed soon after.

Through October 1942, O'Bannon protected landings, carried out escort duties from Nouméa and Espiritu Santo to Guadalcanal and Tulagi, joined in bombardments at Guadalcanal, Munda, and Kolombangara, and shouldered her share of the nightly patrols up "the Slot", guarding against Japanese reinforcements.

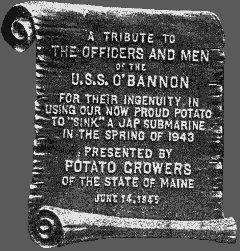
Plaque commemorating the Potato incident

== 1943 ==
On 11 February 1943, O'Bannon was operating with the light cruiser USS Helena when she located a spread of torpedoes fired from the Japanese submarine I-18 and evaded them without damage, and ordered the escorting destroyers to engage the attacker. O'Bannon, led by USS Fletcher, sailed to the area and - along with a floatplane from Helena - dropped their depth charges and sank I-18 with all hands.

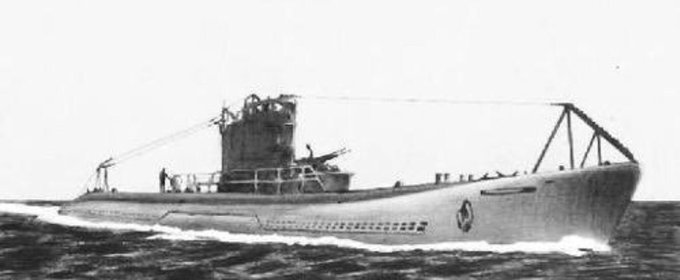
Japanese submarine Ro-34, the victim of O'Bannon's potato armament

On 5 April O'Bannon sighted the Japanese submarine Ro-34 on the surface and opened fire. The submarine pulled alongside the destroyer close enough that the destroyer's guns could not hit it. A Navy legend holds that the sailors on the destroyer pelted the submarine crew with potatoes. Commander Donald MacDonald only said that the submarine was so close, the destroyer's cook believed that he could throw a potato at it. Although MacDonald has repeatedly claimed that no potatoes were actually thrown, the story of an American destroyer sinking a Japanese submarine with potatoes was picked up by the media and was so quickly spread throughout navy lore that many still believe it to this day. Indeed, several of O'Bannon's crew members, such as seamen first class Ambrose Hardin, gunner Bud Moreau, or George Starkey aboard the amidships searchlight platform firsthand recall crewmen throwing potatoes at Ro-34, lending significant credit to the story's authenticity. A plaque commemorating the incident was on display at the Maine Maritime Museum until the 1970s but then went missing.

Despite this, O'Bannon withdrew to 1,000 yards, and was joined by the destroyer USS Strong in furiously shelling Ro-34 as she attempted to crash dive, scoring at least one hit before closing to the area and dropping a pattern of eight depth charges. A sinking was claimed, but Ro-34 indeed survived, albeit probably badly damaged/crippled and was spotted again four days later by Strong and O'Bannon; Strong opened fire first and hit Ro-34 with three 5-inch (127 mm) shells, then O'Bannon joined in and struck the potato victim with her own guns. The combined gunfire sent Ro-34 to the ocean floor for good.

=== Battle of Kula Gulf ===
War duty was tense and demanded the best of men and their ships. In-port time was minimal; a few hours to fuel and reprovision, and the ships were off again. O'Bannon fought in many surface actions. On 5 July, destroyers O'Bannon, USS Chevalier, and USS Strong were scouting ahead of a US cruiser force preparing for shore bombardment on Bairoko Harbor, when suddenly a Japanese torpedo hit and crippled Strong. Chevalier intentionally rammed Strong to remove her crew while O'Bannon engaged the 5.5-inch (14 cm) Japanese shore batteries which had opened fire on the now discovered destroyers. While firing her guns, O'Bannon failed to fully distract the shore guns as shells rained around Chevalier and Strong, resulting in both intact destroyers leaving the scene with 241 survivors while leaving Strong to break apart and sink. The torpedo was recorded as coming from an enemy submarine; it was in fact fired from the Japanese destroyer Niizuki at some 19,000-22,000 yards. As it turned out, a group of Japanese destroyers were on a troop transport run and, using Niizuki's search radar, located the American ships and fired torpedoes at extreme range. The presence of enemy forces resulted in both sides retreating without obtaining their objective.

In the early morning of 6 July, O'Bannon departed with the same cruiser force to continue the mission, but instead endured round two as three targets appeared on the American radar. This was Niizuki, leading the destroyers Suzukaze and Tanikaze, serving as a cover force for a larger troop transport mission ferrying 2,600 soldiers. The three American light cruisers - USS Honolulu, Saint Louis, and Helena - all blasted Niizuki, sinking her with almost all hands, but Suzukaze and Tanikaze fired 16 torpedoes as they retreated, 3 of which hit Helena which broke apart and sank. O'Bannon followed Honolulu and Saint Louis in hunting down the remaining Japanese destroyers, and fired a full spread of 10 torpedoes, none of which hit. The only other sinking was scored when Honolulu damaged the Nagatsuki and forced her to run aground, otherwise the Hatsuyuki was hit six times, Suzukaze twice, and Tanikaze once, but dud shell hits allowed them to escape with only moderate to light damage. This also failed to detract from the Japanese sinking far more tonnage than they lost, successfully transporting their ground troops, and further suspending the American bombardment.

=== Battle of Kolombangara ===
A week later, allied coast watchers spotted another Japanese troop transport force under the protection of the light cruiser Jintsū, the modern destroyers Yukikaze, Hamakaze, Kiyonami, and Yūgure, and the older destroyer Minazuki. O'Bannon was assigned as part of a task force consisting of 10 destroyers and 3 light cruisers - including many veterans of the battle of Kula Gulf - sent to stop the enemy. In the night of the 12th, the opposing forces made contact with each other, and when Jintsū lit her searchlights, the allied cruisers opened fire. A flurry of 6-inch (152 mm) gunfire mostly from Honolulu and Saint Louis blasted Jintsū, destroying her guns and setting her on fire, before three destroyers were tasked with assisting in the kill. O'Bannon, Nicholas, and USS Taylor closed to point blank range and unleashed a spread of 15 torpedoes, one of which gouged into Jintsū below her first funnel and helped to disable her alongside the cruiser gunfire. Upon failing to track any other targets, O'Bannon, Nicholas, and Taylor dumped to rest of their torpedoes at the crippled Jintsū, at least one of which hit and delivering the finishing blow, sending the cruiser to the ocean floor.

However, the victory was only temporary. The four modern Japanese destroyers unloaded their torpedoes and dashed off. A type 93 torpedo fired from the ever-pesky Yukikaze hit the light cruiser HMZNS Leander, damaging her so badly she could not be repaired in time to take further part in WW2, and was permanently decommissioned from the New Zealand navy, making up for Jintsū's loss. Yukikaze, Hamakaze, Kiyonami, and Yūgure retreated and reloaded their torpedoes, and a half hour later closed the range for another strike. O'Bannon entered a rematch with Yukikaze as every available gun targeted the lead Japanese destroyer, and while Yukikaze was straddled and near missed many times, not a single shell directly hit, much to the amazement of Hamakaze's crew, as the four destroyers fired the rest of their torpedoes and dashed off. O'Bannon was not damaged, but one torpedo hit each crippled Honolulu and Saint Louis, and sank the destroyer USS Gwin.

The battle of Kolombangara was a costly victory with the loss of Jintsū, but a victory nonetheless. Alongside destroying more tonnage than they lost, the Japanese successfully landed their troops.

=== Battle of Horaniu ===
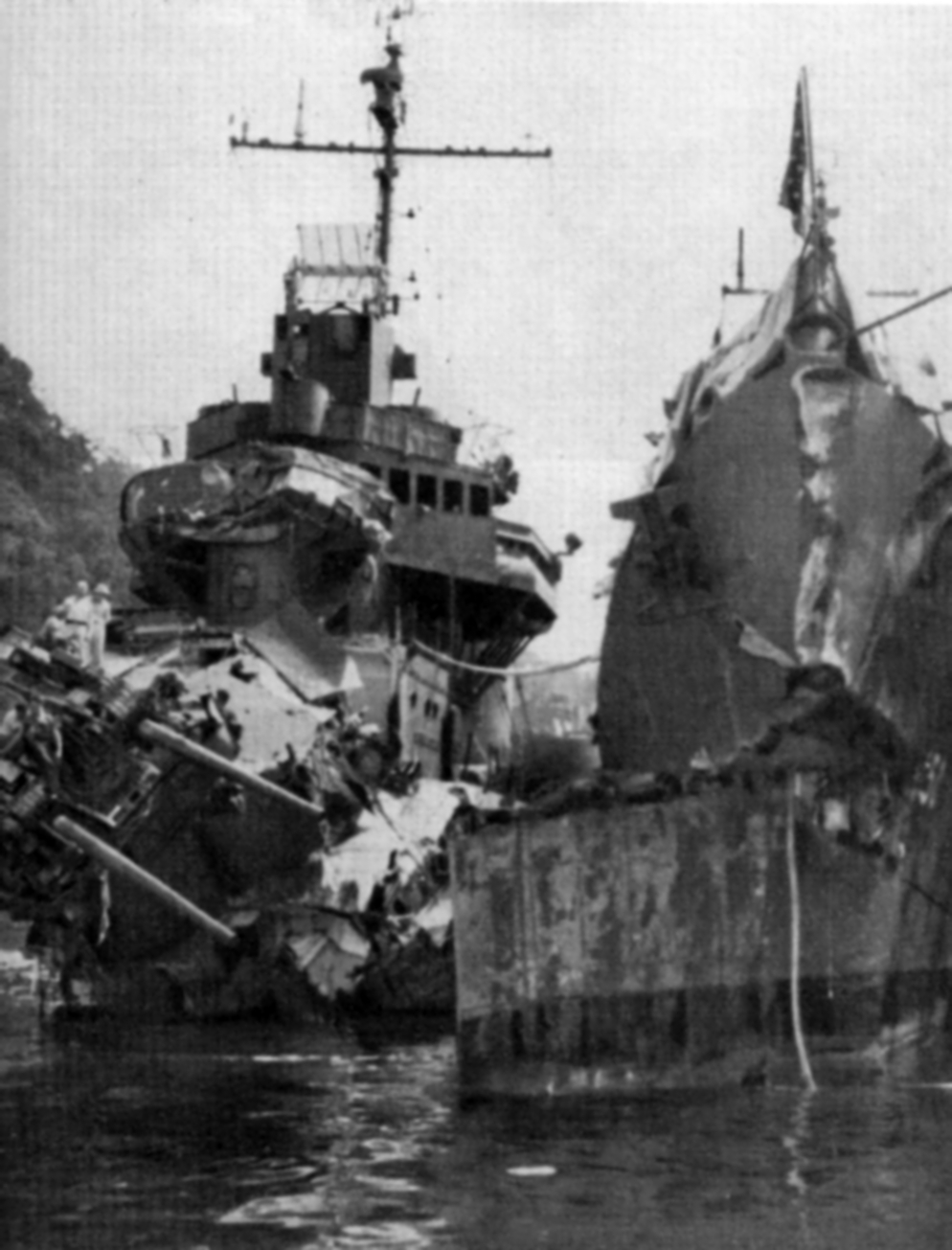
O'Bannon (right) and Selfridge after the Battle of Vella Lavella, 1943

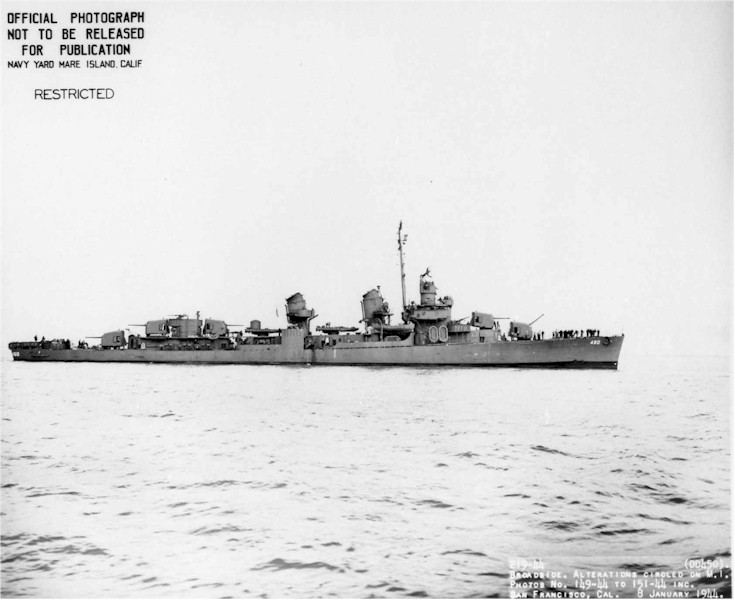
O'Bannon anchored off Mare Island on 8 January 1944

For the next two months, O'Bannon spent most of her time in Vella Gulf, guarding landings, intercepting Japanese troop convoys and their covering escorts, and fighting off air attacks. With the aid of sister destroyers, she sank a number of barges, two submarine chasers (Cha-5 and Cha-12), an armed boat, and a gunboat on various patrols.

=== Battle of Vella Lavella ===
Main Article: Battle of Vella Lavella

The climax of operations in the area was the Battle of Vella Lavella on 6 October, brought on by Japanese attempts to evacuate their troops from that island. With the destroyers Selfridge and Chevalier, O'Bannon made the first attack on the evacuation force, a group of nine or ten destroyers and smaller armed craft. The three American ships contacted six enemy destroyers, shrugged at the odds, and raced at 33 knots (61 km/h) to launch torpedoes and open gunfire. The Yūgumo was turned into a blazing hulk, but both Selfridge and Chevalier took torpedo hits. O'Bannon was close on Chevalier's stern when the latter was struck, and the most radical maneuvers could not keep her from swinging into her sister's side. The enemy retired with three newly arrived American destroyers in pursuit, while O'Bannon guarded her stricken sisters, rescuing the survivors of Chevalier.

== 1944 ==
O'Bannon made battle repairs at Tulagi, then sailed to the west coast for overhaul. By 18 March 1944, she was back in the Solomons, ready for her part in the series of westward-moving amphibious assaults that won New Guinea. Again, it was escort and bombardment repeatedly until 18 October, when O'Bannon cleared Hollandia to escort reinforcements for the invasion of Leyte. The convoy was brought in safely on 24 October, the eve of the Battle for Leyte Gulf. O'Bannon guarded the Northern Transport area and patrolled the entrances to Leyte Gulf during the battle, coming under air attack. Thus, she played her part in the definitive destruction of the Japanese Navy.

== 1945 ==
Through June 1945 O'Bannon operated primarily in the Philippines, serving in the escort or assault force for the long roll call of invasions: Ormoc Bay, Mindoro, Lingayen Gulf, Bataan, Corregidor, Palawan, Zamboanga, Cebu, and Caraboa. Air attacks were frequent in the early period, and O'Bannon splashed several raiders. During the Lingayen offensive on 31 January 1945, O'Bannon, with three other destroyers, attacked and sank an enemy submarine; Japanese records studied after the war indicate it was most likely Ro-115. At the end of April and early in May, O'Bannon interrupted her Philippine operations to give fire support at Tarakan, Borneo, and cover minesweeping operations there.

O'Bannon rendezvoused with a group of escort carriers off Okinawa on 17 June and guarded them as they struck against Sakishima Gunto. In July, she protected the large carriers as they flew strikes on northern Honshū and Hokkaidō. With the close of the war, O'Bannon patrolled the coast of Honshū until 27 August, when she joined the destroyers Nicholas and Taylor to escort the battleship Missouri into Tokyo Bay, by order of Admiral William Halsey, "because of their valorous fight up the long road from the South Pacific to the very end." There, she patrolled until 1 September. She then sailed to San Francisco and San Diego, where she was decommissioned after overhaul on 21 May 1946.

== 1949–1962 ==
Between 17 January 1949 and 10 February 1950, O'Bannon was converted to an escort destroyer at Long Beach Naval Shipyard. She was redesignated DDE-450 on 26 March 1949.

O'Bannon was recommissioned on 19 February 1951 to serve out of Pearl Harbor. She sailed for her first tour of duty with the United Nations forces repelling Communist aggression in Korea on 19 November, and, during the next seven months, she guarded carriers at sea as their air groups struck targets in Korea; served as flagship for the Wonsan Element, East Coast Blockade and Escort Group; fired on enemy gun emplacements, road and rail supply routes, ammunition depots, and troop concentrations; and protected convoys moving between Korea and Japan.

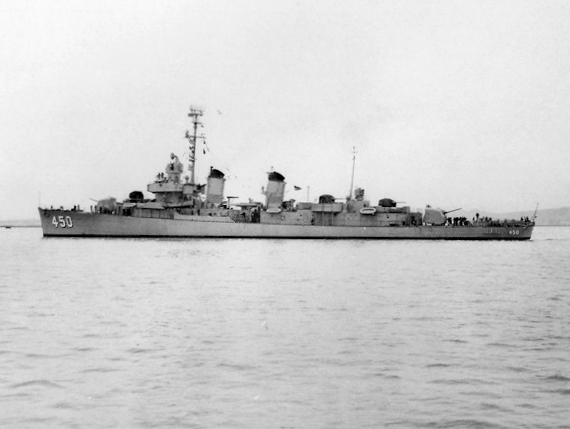
O'Bannon during her conversion to a destroyer escort, 24 March 1951

A training period out of Pearl Harbor began upon her return home on 20 June 1952, and she took part in U.S. Atomic Energy Commission operations off Eniwetok. O'Bannon cleared Pearl Harbor late in April 1953 for the Far East, where her primary mission was screening carriers. Thereafter, she served on the Taiwan Patrol and in exercises off Japan and Okinawa.

Between the Korean War and the Vietnam War, O'Bannon took her part in the intricately planned schedule that assured the United States that its 7th Fleet was always composed of ships and men whose readiness for any emergency was at its keenest. For O'Bannon, this meant an alternation of roughly six-month deployments to the Far East and periods spent in training operations and necessary overhauls at Pearl Harbor. While in the Far East, she visited ports in Japan, the Philippines, Taiwan, Australia and New Zealand, with brief, welcome recreation calls at Hong Kong. She was often in either New Zealand or Australia for the annual commemoration of the Battle of the Coral Sea, a time of national rejoicing in those countries at which Americans are particularly welcome. She conducted combined operations training with the SEATO allies as well as exercising with Marines at Okinawa and taking part in exercises preparing for any conceivable demand that might be made on the 7th Fleet. While at Pearl Harbor, she often aided in training reservists in addition to her own training and, at various times, sailed down-range for space orbits and missile shots. In the summer and fall of 1962, she took part in atomic tests at Johnston Island.

== 1964–1970 ==
In 1964, O'Bannon took part in the 1965 film In Harm's Way. At 1 hour and 09 minutes into the film, as Kirk Douglas' character is welcoming a new transport, O'Bannon is seen full length in the background. Its hull number 450 can be seen somewhat obscured on the starboard bow.

O'Bannon first closed the coast of Vietnam during her 1964–65 deployment, when, on 26 December, she left Hong Kong to patrol and conduct hydrographic surveys. Much of her 1966 tour was spent as plane guard for the aircraft carrier Kitty Hawk, while the carrier's jets struck targets in South and North Vietnam to lessen Communist ability to wage war in the South. For a week each in May and June, O'Bannon fired shore bombardments, destroying Vietcong base camps, troop concentrations, and small craft.

The veteran destroyer returned via Yokosuka to Pearl Harbor on 30 July. During operations out of home port, she trained for Apollo space craft recovery operations in August and was a member of the contingency recovery force for the Gemini 11 space flight early in September. She visited Guam in the spring of 1967 and returned home early in July to prepare for another Far Eastern deployment.

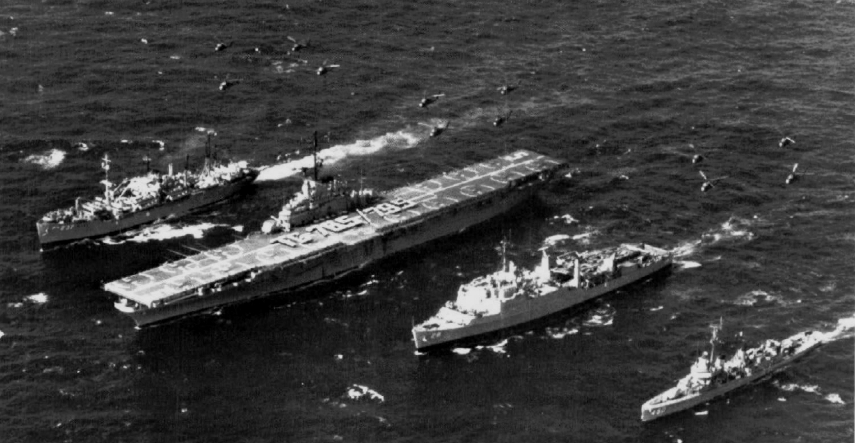
O'Bannon (right) as part of TG 76.5 off Vietnam in March 1965

O'Bannon got under way for Japan on 28 September and reached Yokosuka on 7 October and Subic Bay on the 15th. She returned to the war zone with the carrier Constellation and operated as plane guard on Yankee Station through 4 November. After a fortnight's respite at Subic Bay and Hong Kong, O'Bannon sailed to Da Nang for shore bombardment. She visited Taiwan early in December but returned to the fighting on the 15th to provide gunfire support just south of the DMZ. Two days later, she helped to rescue the crew of an American plane that had been hit over the DMZ and had managed to crash just off shore. An enemy battery shelled the destroyer during the operation but failed to score. As 1967 ended, O'Bannon was still on the gun line supporting allied ground forces.

On 30 January 1970, O'Bannon was decommissioned in a ceremony at Pearl Harbor (side-by-side with her sister Nicholas, as at their launching) and stricken from the Navy List. She was sold for scrap on 6 June 1970 and broken up two years later.

O'Bannon received the Presidential Unit Citation and 17 battle stars for World War II service, placing her among the most decorated US Naval vessels of World War II. She also received three more battle stars for service during the Korean War. Nicknamed the "Lucky O", none of her crew was awarded the Purple Heart.

== Quotes ==
The history of the Pacific war can never be written without telling the story of the U.S.S. O'Bannon. Time after time the O'Bannon and her gallant little sisters were called upon to turn back the enemy. They never disappointed me.

— Admiral William F. Halsey

== Awards ==

Combat Action Ribbon with 2 star	Presidential Unit Citation	American Campaign Medal
Asiatic-Pacific Campaign Medal with 17 battle stars	World War II Victory Medal	Navy Occupation Service Medal
National Defense Service Medal with 1 star	Korean Service Medal with 3 battle stars	Vietnam Service Medal with 2 stars
Philippine Presidential Unit Citation	Korean Presidential Unit Citation	Vietnam Cross of Gallantry
Philippine Liberation Medal with 2 stars	United Nations Korea Medal	Vietnam Campaign Medal

== See also ==
- CDR George Philip Jr., served on O'Bannon (1942–43), as the Executive officer, Navigator and Combat Intelligence Officer. Received the Silver Star for service 10 January 1943 to 6 April 1943 aboard O'Bannon.
