= Japanese destroyer Sazanami (1931) =

Fubuki-class destroyer

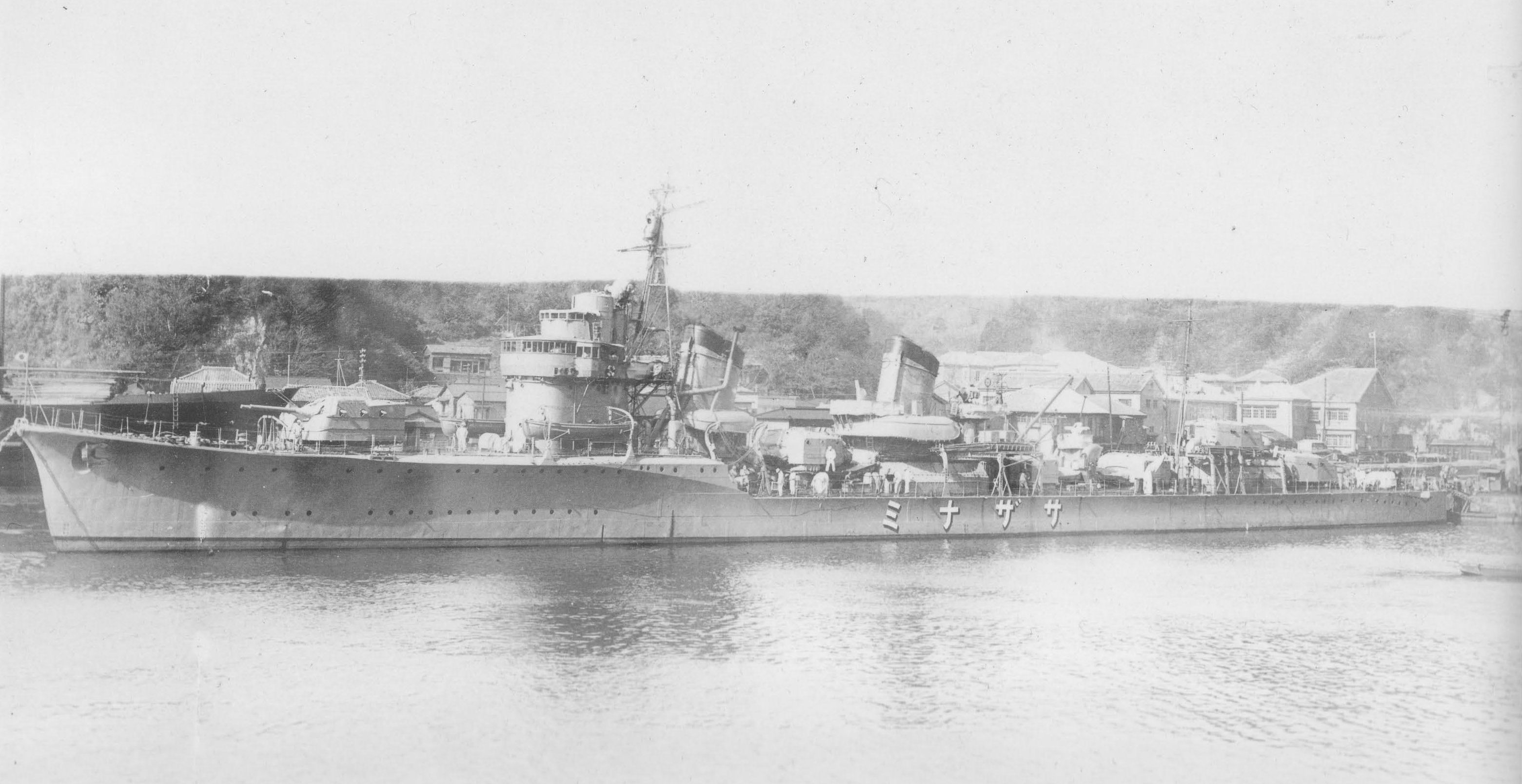
- Sazanami on 15 April 1940

History

Empire of Japan
- Name: Sazanami
- Namesake: Japanese destroyer Sazanami (1899)
- Ordered: 1923 Fiscal Year
- Builder: Maizuru Naval Arsenal
- Yard number: Destroyer No. 53
- Laid down: 21 March 1930
- Launched: 6 June 1931
- Commissioned: 19 May 1932
- Stricken: 10 March 1944
- Fate: Sunk, 14 January 1944

General characteristics
- Class & type: Fubuki-class destroyer
- Displacement: 1,750 long tons (1,780 t) standard; 2,050 long tons (2,080 t) re-built
- Length: 111.96 m (367.3 ft) pp; 115.3 m (378 ft) waterline; 118.41 m (388.5 ft) overall
- Beam: 10.4 m (34 ft 1 in)
- Draft: 3.2 m (10 ft 6 in)
- Propulsion: 4 × Kampon type boilers; 2 × Kampon Type Ro geared turbines; 2 × shafts at 50,000 ihp (37,000 kW)
- Speed: 38 knots (44 mph; 70 km/h)
- Range: 5,000 nmi (9,300 km) at 14 knots (26 km/h)
- Complement: 219
- Armament: 6 × Type 3 127 mm 50 caliber naval guns (3×2); up to 22 × Type 96 25 mm AT/AA guns; up to 10 × 13 mm AA guns; 9 × 610 mm (24 in) torpedo tubes; 36 × depth charges

Service record
- Operations: Second Sino-Japanese War; Invasion of French Indochina; Battle of Malaya; Battle of Midway; Indian Ocean raid; Solomon Islands campaign

Sazanami (漣, "Ripples") was the nineteenth of twenty-four Fubuki-class destroyers, built for the Imperial Japanese Navy following World War I.

== History ==
Construction of the advanced Fubuki-class destroyers was authorized as part of the Imperial Japanese Navy's expansion program from fiscal 1923, intended to give Japan a qualitative edge with the world's most modern ships. The Fubuki class had performance that was a quantum leap over previous destroyer designs, so much so that they were designated Special Type destroyers (特型, Tokugata). The large size, powerful engines, high speed, large radius of action and unprecedented armament gave these destroyers the firepower similar to many light cruisers in other navies. Sazanami, built at the Maizuru was the seventh in an improved series, which incorporated a modified gun turret which could elevate her main battery of Type 3 127 mm 50 caliber naval guns to 75° as opposed to the original 40°, thus permitting the guns to be used as dual purpose guns against aircraft. Sazanami laid down on 21 February 1930, launched on 6 June 1931 and commissioned on 19 May 1932. Originally assigned hull designation “Destroyer No. 53”, she was given the name Sazanami before her launch.

== Operational history ==
On completion, Sazanami was assigned to the IJN 2nd Fleet. During the Second Sino-Japanese War, from 1937, Sazanami covered landing of Japanese forces in Shanghai and Hangzhou. From 1940, she was assigned to patrol and cover landings of Japanese forces in south China, and participated in the Invasion of French Indochina.

=== World War II history ===
At the time of the attack on Pearl Harbor, Sazanami was assigned to Destroyer Division 7 of the IJN 1st Air Fleet, and had deployed from Tateyama Naval Air Station as part of the force which bombarded Midway Atoll in the opening stages of the war.

Sazanami was subsequently part of the escort for the aircraft carriers Hiryū and Sōryū during air strikes against Ambon. She was subsequently part of the escort for the cruisers Nachi and Haguro during the Japanese invasion of the eastern Netherlands East Indies. On 2 March, at the Battle of the Java Sea, Sazanami assisted in attacking the submarine USS Perch. She returned to Yokosuka Naval Arsenal for repairs at the end of March.

At the end of April, Sazanami escorted the aircraft carrier Shōhō to Truk, and subsequently joined Admiral Takeo Takagi’s force at the Battle of the Coral Sea. At the end the battle, she rescued 225 survivors, and returned to Yokosuka via Saipan, and was subsequently based at Ōminato Guard District for patrols of northern waters until mid-July.

On 14 July, Sazanami was reassigned to the Combined Fleet, and escorted the battleship Yamato and aircraft carrier Taiyō at the Battle of the Eastern Solomons on 24 August. Throughout the month of September, Sazanami was assigned to numerous "Tokyo Express" transport missions to various locations in the Solomon Islands. In early October, Sazanami escorted the damaged Taiyō to Kure Naval Arsenal for repairs, and went into dry dock at Yokosuka Naval Arsenal herself. She returned to active duty as escort for Taiyō on 1 November, and continued to escort Taiyō and Unyō from October to February 1943. Through the rest of 1943, Sazanami continued to serve as an escort for Unyō, and Taiyō between Yokosuka and Truk and Kavieng through August. Sazanami was flagship for Rear Admiral Matsuji Ijuin during the Battle off Horaniu, where she covered landings of troops on Vella Lavella. After helping evacuate surviving Japanese forces from Rekata at the end of the month, Sazanami resumed her former role as escort to various aircraft carriers through the end of the year.

On 1 January 1944, Sazanami was reassigned to the IJN 5th Fleet. On 12 January, Sazanami departed Rabaul to join a tanker convoy en route from Palau to Truk. She was torpedoed by the submarine USS Albacore, sinking 300 nautical miles (560 km) southeast of Yap at position 05°15′N 141°15′E. Of her crew, 153 died; 89 survivors were rescued by her sister ship Akebono.

On 10 March 1944, Sazanami was removed from the navy list.

== Bibliography ==
- D'Albas, Andrieu (1965). Death of a Navy: Japanese Naval Action in World War II. Devin-Adair Pub. ISBN 0-8159-5302-X.
- Brown, David (1990). Warship Losses of World War Two. Naval Institute Press. ISBN 1-55750-914-X.
- Howarth, Stephen (1983). The Fighting Ships of the Rising Sun: The Drama of the Imperial Japanese Navy, 1895–1945. Atheneum. ISBN 0-689-11402-8.
- Jentsura, Hansgeorg (1976). Warships of the Imperial Japanese Navy, 1869–1945. US Naval Institute Press. ISBN 0-87021-893-X.
- Nelson, Andrew N. (1967). Japanese–English Character Dictionary. Tuttle. ISBN 0-8048-0408-7.
- Watts, Anthony J (1967). Japanese Warships of World War II. Doubleday. ISBN 978-0-3850-9189-3.
- Whitley, M J (2000). Destroyers of World War Two: An International Encyclopedia. London: Arms and Armour Press. ISBN 1-85409-521-8.
