= USS Chevalier (DD-451) =

Fletcher-class destroyer

Coordinates: 7°30′S 156°14′E

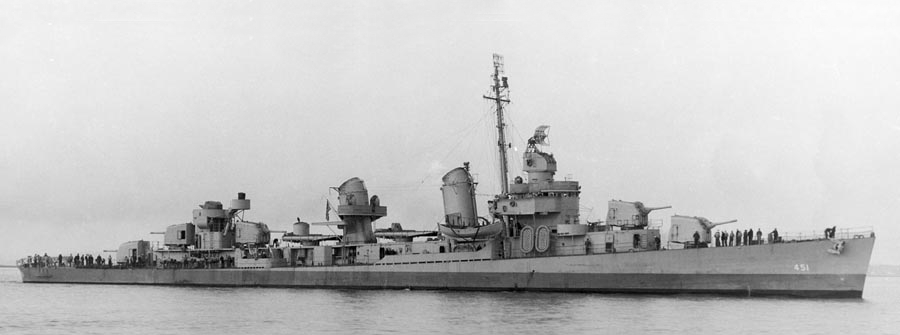
- USS Chevalier (DD-451) in October 1942

History

United States
- Name: Chevalier
- Namesake: Lieutenant Commander Godfrey Chevalier
- Ordered: July 1940
- Builder: Bath Iron Works
- Laid down: 30 April 1941
- Launched: 11 April 1942
- Commissioned: 20 July 1942
- Stricken: 16 November 1943
- Fate: Scuttled after being torpedoed and accidentally rammed, 7 October 1943

General characteristics
- Class & type: Fletcher-class destroyer
- Displacement: 2,050 tons
- Length: 376 ft 6 in (114.7 m)
- Beam: 39 ft 8 in (12.1 m)
- Draft: 17 ft 9 in (5.4 m)
- Propulsion: 60,000 shp (45 MW); 2 propellers
- Speed: 35 knots (65 km/h; 40 mph)
- Range: 6500 nmi. (12,000 km) at 15 kt
- Complement: 329
- Armament: 5 × 5 in (130 mm)/38 guns, 1 × 1.1"/75 caliber quad AA gun, 5 × 20 mm AA guns, 10 × 21 inch (533 mm) torpedo tubes

USS Chevalier (DD-451), a Fletcher-class destroyer, was the first ship of the United States Navy to be named for Lieutenant Commander Godfrey Chevalier.

== History ==
Chevalier was launched 11 April 1942 by Bath Iron Works Corp., Bath, Maine; sponsored by Mrs. G. DeC. Chevalier, commissioned 20 July 1942. Between 3 October and 11 December 1942 Chevalier made three convoy escort voyages: one coastwise, with tankers; a second, from Bermuda to Norfolk, Virginia and with one of the first reinforcement convoys for North Africa. Sailing from Norfolk 17 December, Chevalier reached Efate, New Hebrides 22 January 1943. On 27 January she sortied with Task Force 18 (TF 18) to cover the movement of troop transports to Guadalcanal. On 29 and 30 January Chevalier joined in protective antiaircraft fire as her force came under intensive Japanese air attack in the Battle of Rennell Island. Chevalier operated on patrol from Efate, and after 14 February from Espiritu Santo.

On 7 May 1943 she escorted three minelayers as they mined Blackett Strait, and Kula Gulf, Solomon Islands. The next night three Japanese destroyers, Kuroshio, Oyashio, and Kagerō, ran into the minefield and were severely damaged by the mines and then sunk by aircraft. Between 11 May and 14 May, Chevalier joined in the bombardment of Vila, and covered another minelaying operation in Kula Gulf.

On 28 June 1943 the destroyer again sailed from Espiritu Santo as a part of the covering force for troops bound for landings at Rice anchorage to block Japanese movements from Vila to Munda, Solomon Islands. Chevalier, USS O'Bannon, and USS Strong entered Kula Gulf shortly before midnight, 1 July, and began to bombard Vila and Bairoko Harbor, while the transports headed for the anchorage. Coincidentally, 4 Japanese destroyers - the Niizuki, Nagatsuki, Satsuki, and Yūnagi - were sailing through the area on a troop transport mission, and Niizuki's radar detected the American destroyers. Between 19,000-22,000 yards, Niizuki, Nagatsuki, and Yūnagi fired 14 torpedoes at the American ships, and a type 93 torpedo from Niizuki slammed into Strong and disabled the destroyer, tearing open her hull amidships on both sides. Chevalier deliberately rammed her bow into Strong's port side and lay alongside for several minutes while Strong's survivors crawled on board. Japanese 5.5-inch (14 cm) shore batteries opened fire on the stricken ship, but Chevalier remained alongside until 241 survivors had come on board, while USS O'Bannon delivered counterfire against the Japanese guns. Chevalier pulled clear of Strong at 01:22, and the stricken destroyer sank a minute later. Chevalier had torn a hole 10 by 2 feet in her bow, but it did not seriously impair her operating ability as it was well above her waterline. The destroyer returned to Espiritu Santo 8 July for repairs, taking no further role in the battle of Kula Gulf which further saw the Japanese trade the destroyers Niizuki and Nagatsuki for the light cruiser USS Helena and complete their troop transport mission in a Japanese victory.

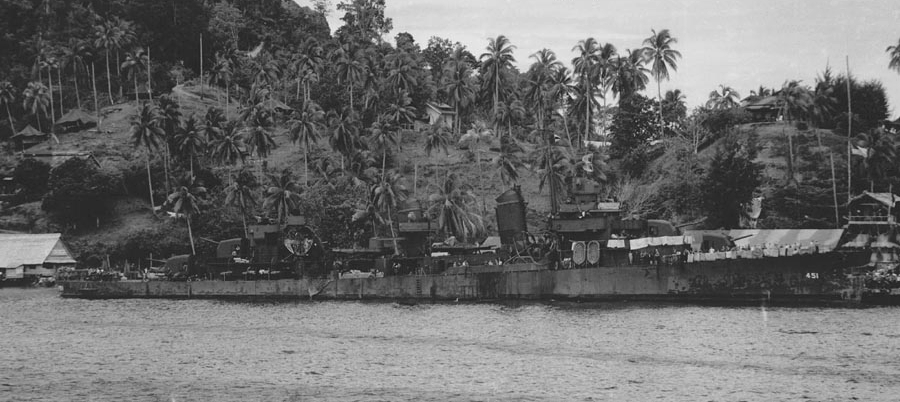
Chevalier at Tulagi, disembarking survivors of Strong, 6 July 1943.

Repairs completed 22 July 1943, Chevalier operated throughout the Solomons on patrol and escort duty until 14 August. On 15 August the destroyer covered the landings at Vella Lavella, Solomon Islands. On the 17th Chevalier and three other destroyers were dispatched to intercept four Japanese destroyers and several enemy barges who were attempting to reinforce Kolombangara. After a brief encounter between the destroyers, in which neither side suffered to any great extent, the Japanese destroyers departed the area, abandoning the barges. The American forces turned their attention to this objective and sank or severely damaged all of them and sank two submarine chasers (Cha-5 and Cha-12). The destroyer returned to Espiritu Santo 29 August and during September made an escort voyage to Sydney, Australia.

On 6 October 1943 Chevalier, O'Bannon, and USS Selfridge intercepted nine Japanese destroyers and destroyer transports attempting to evacuate troops from Vella Lavella, Solomon Islands. Although greatly outnumbered, the American destroyers attacked. After firing half of their torpedoes and scoring several hits with gunfire, the group continued to steam into the line of fire of enemy torpedoes in order to keep their own guns bearing. At approximately 22:05 Chevalier was struck on the port bow by an enemy torpedo which tore her bow off to the bridge, throwing the ship entirely out of control. The destroyer O'Bannon which was following Chevalier could not avoid the damaged destroyer and rammed her in the after engine room, flooding that space and stopping Chevalier's port shaft. While making preparations to abandon ship, Chevalier's skipper ordered the torpedoes in her tubes to be fired at the Japanese destroyer Yūgumo. The burning Japanese ship blew up soon after. By 23:26 it was apparent that Chevalier could not be saved and the order was given to abandon ship. Her crew was picked up by O'Bannon's boats, and Chevalier was sunk the following day by a torpedo from USS La Vallette. Her severed bow was located about a mile to the west and was sunk with depth charges. Chevalier lost 54 killed, and suffered 36 wounded.

== Honors ==
Chevalier received three battle stars for World War II service.

== Bibliography ==
- Brown, David. Warship Losses of World War Two. Arms and Armour, London, Great Britain, 1990. ISBN 0-85368-802-8.
- Davis, Rick E. (2013). "USS Chevalier (DD-451)". Warship International. L (1): 59–61. ISSN 0043-0374.
