= Ijuin Matsuji =

Imperial Japanese commander (1893–1944)

Baron Matsuji Ijuin
- 伊集院 松治
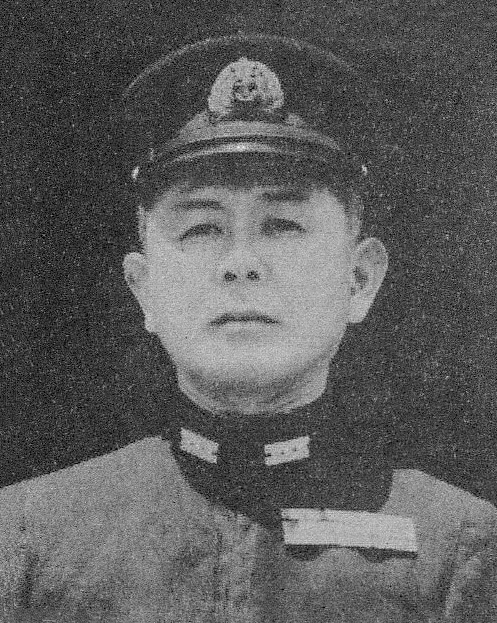
- Born: April 21, 1893; Tokyo, Empire of Japan
- Died: May 24, 1944 (aged 51); North of Saipan
- Military career
- Allegiance: Empire of Japan
- Branch: Imperial Japanese Navy
- Service years: 1915–1944
- Rank: Vice Admiral (posthumous)
- Commands: Hasu, Yomogi, Sawakaze, Yūzuki, Ikazuchi, 23rd Destroyer Division, 8th Destroyer Division, Naka, Atago, Kongō, 3rd Destroyer Squadron
- Conflicts: World War II; Pacific War; Battle off Horaniu; Naval Battle of Vella Lavella; Battle of Empress Augusta Bay; Battle of Saipan †

Baron Matsuji Ijuin (伊集院 松治, Ijūin Matsuji; 21 April 1893 – 24 May 1944) was a commander in the Imperial Japanese Navy during World War II, who was promoted posthumously to vice admiral after being killed in action in combat off Saipan.

== Life and military career ==
Born in the Kōjimachi district of Tokyo, Ijuin was the son of Fleet Admiral Baron Ijuin Gorō. He was a graduate of the 43rd class of the Imperial Japanese Naval Academy in 1915. However, his academic record was not outstanding, as he was 92nd in a class of 96. As a midshipman, he was assigned to the Iwate on its 1915 cruise from Sasebo to Chemulpo, Port Arthur, Dairen, Chinkai, Maizuru and Toba. In 1916, Iwate made a cruise to Hong Kong, Singapore, Fremantle, Sydney, Melbourne, Wellington, Auckland, Jaluit Atoll, Ponape and Truk. On his return to Japan in October, Ijuin was reassigned to the cruiser Tsushima and then, as an ensign, to the cruiser Azuma in December.

In October 1917, Ijiun was assigned to the Tokiwa. He returned to training school to study torpedo tactics and early submarine warfare in 1918, during which time he received a promotion to sub-lieutenant, after which he was assigned to the Katori. In 1921, on the death of his father, he became a baron (danshaku) under the kazoku peerage system. Later the same year he was promoted to lieutenant. He was assigned to the cruiser Yakumo on a cruise in 1926: (Shanghai, Hong Kong, Singapore, Colombo, Aden, Port Said, Constantinople, Athens, Naples, Toulon, Marseille, Barcelona, Malta, Alexandria, Djibouti, Mombasa, Columbo, Batavia and Manila). After his return, Ijuin was promoted to lieutenant commander.

Ijiun served as captain of several destroyers in the early 1930s, and was also appointed as an aide-de-camp to Prince Fushimi Hiroyoshi in 1932. Promoted to full commander on 15 November 1934, Ijuin was subsequently executive officer on the Abukuma in 1935. He made full captain on 15 November 1938 and was given command of the Naka in 1940, followed by the Atago in 1941, and commanded her during the Battle of Midway in June 1942. At the end of December 1942, he was given command of the battleship Kongō.

Ijuin saw no direct combat during the early months of World War II. However, on his promotion to rear admiral on 1 November 1943, he commanded DESRON-3, based at Rabaul, New Britain during the Solomon Islands campaign. He was the main Japanese commander at the minor Battle off Horaniu and larger Naval Battle of Vella Lavella, during which time he successfully evacuated the 600-man Japanese garrison from the island of Vella Lavella, while repulsing attacks by American naval forces under Captain Frank R. Walker on 6–7 October 1943. Leading screening forces from the cruiser Sendai during the Battle of Empress Augusta Bay on 2 November 1943, Ijuin survived the sinking of Sendai and was later rescued, along with a few other survivors, by submarine Ro-104.

Ijuin was killed when his flagship, the patrol boat Iki, was torpedoed and sunk by USS Raton on 24 May 1944, 150 miles west of Sarawak, Borneo. He was posthumously promoted to vice admiral.
