= USS Bigelow =

Forrest Sherman-class destroyer in the United States Navy.

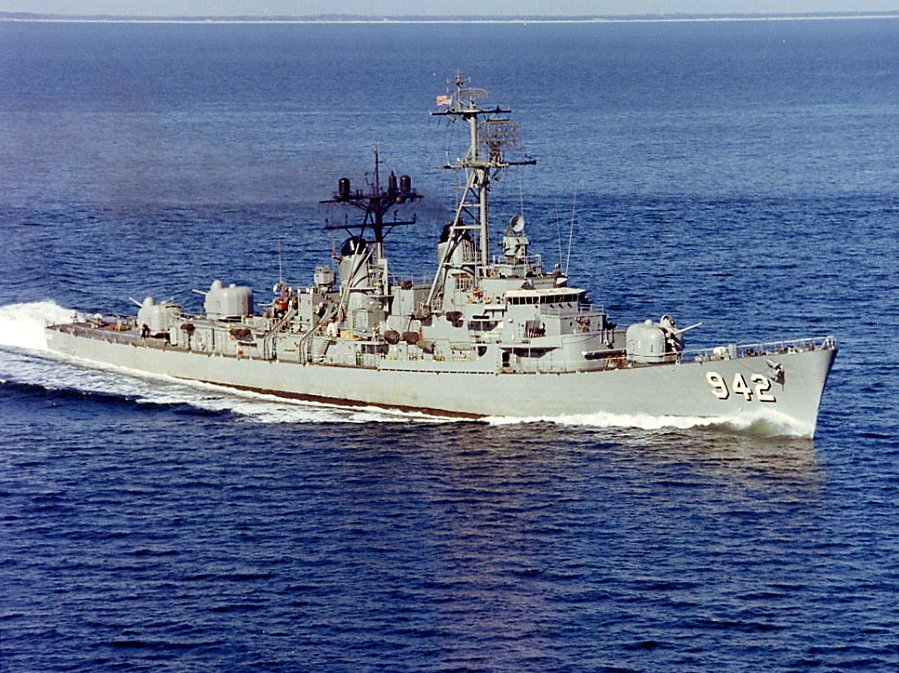
- USS Bigelow underway on 30 January 1967

History

United States
- Name: USS Bigelow
- Namesake: Elmer Charles Bigelow
- Ordered: 30 July 1954
- Builder: Bath Iron Works
- Laid down: 6 July 1955
- Launched: 2 February 1957
- Acquired: 1 November 1957
- Commissioned: 8 November 1957
- Decommissioned: 5 November 1982
- Stricken: 1 June 1990
- Motto: Concorditer Pugnamus
- Fate: Sunk as target, 2 April 2003

General characteristics
- Class & type: Forrest Sherman-class destroyer
- Displacement: 2,800 tons standard; 4,050 tons full load
- Length: 407 ft (124 m) waterline, 418 ft (127 m) overall.
- Beam: 45 ft (14 m)
- Draft: 22 ft (6.7 m)
- Propulsion: 4 x 1,200 psi (8.3 MPa) Foster Wheeler boilers, Westinghouse steam turbines; 70,000 shp (52,000 kW); 2 x shafts.
- Speed: 32.5 knots (60.2 km/h; 37.4 mph)
- Range: 4,500 nautical miles (8,300 km; 5,200 mi) at 20 knots (37 km/h; 23 mph)
- Complement: 15 officers, 218 enlisted.
- Armament: 3 x 5 in (127 mm) 54 calibre dual purpose Mk 42 guns; 4 x 3 in (76 mm) 50 calibre Mark 33 anti-aircraft guns; 2 x mark 10/11 Hedgehogs; 6 x 12.75 in (324 mm) Mark 32 torpedo tubes.

USS Bigelow (DD-942) was a Forrest Sherman-class destroyer in the United States Navy. The ship was named for Watertender Second Class Elmer Charles Bigelow (1920–1945), who was killed in action extinguishing a magazine fire while serving on board Fletcher during action against enemy Japanese forces off Corregidor in the Philippines on 14 February 1945. Bigelow was posthumously awarded the Medal of Honor.

Bigelow was built by the Bath Iron Works Corporation at Bath in Maine. The ship was launched by Mrs. Verna B. Perry, mother of Elmer C. Bigelow.

Bigelow was part of Combined Task Group CTG 136.1.1 tasked with blockading Cuba during the Cuban Missile Crisis. Bigelow received the Armed Forces Expeditionary Medal for participating from 24 October 1962 to 21 November 1962.

Bigelow saw extensive service in the Vietnam War and also served as a NASA recovery ship for the Mercury and Gemini III programs.

While operating off Vietnam on 20 April 1967, an explosion in a gun mount injured six sailors, 1 killed.

Bigelow served as a test platform for Phalanx CIWS in 1977. The mount was installed just aft of the aft radar gun director.

Glenn R. Brindel, commanding officer of USS Stark during the 1987 missile attack, was executive officer of Bigelow from 1978 to 1980.

== Fate ==
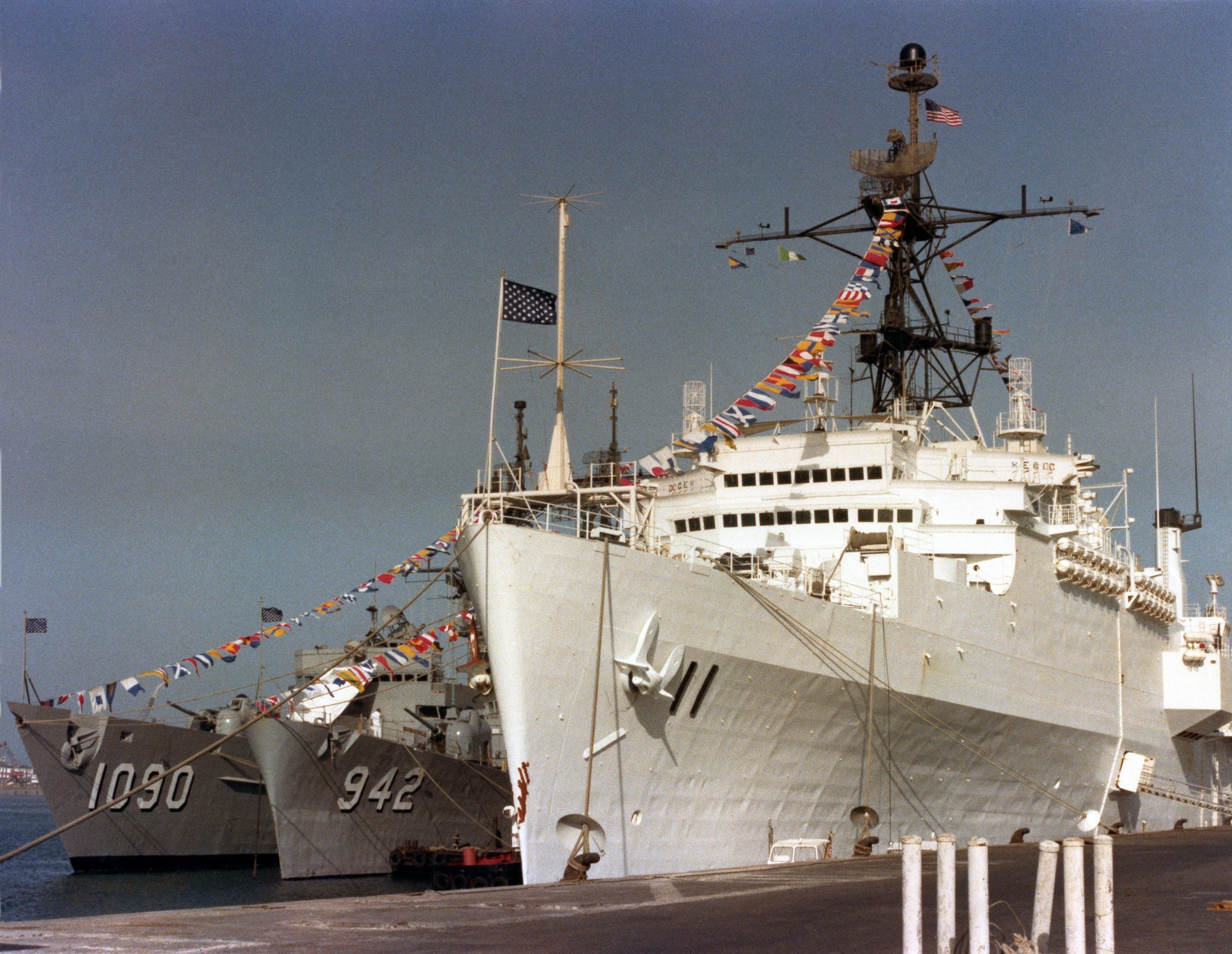
Left to Right: Ainsworth, Bigelow, and Coronado pier-side in Mina Salman, Bahrain in the summer of 1981. Coronado, the flagship of the U.S. Middle East Forces at the time, was painted white as is tradition for flagships since the Great White Fleet.

Bigelow decommissioned 5 November 1982.

She was sold for scrap to the Fore River Shipyard and Iron Works at Quincy, Massachusetts, on 11 December 1992. When the Fore River Shipyard went bankrupt she was resold to N. R. Acquisition Incorporated of New York City by the Massachusetts Bankruptcy Court. She was re-acquired by the Navy for disposition as a target ship, stricken 1 June 1990 and was "Disposed of in support of Fleet training exercise" (presumably sunk as a gunnery target) on or before 2 April 2003.
