= Suzanna (aircraft) =

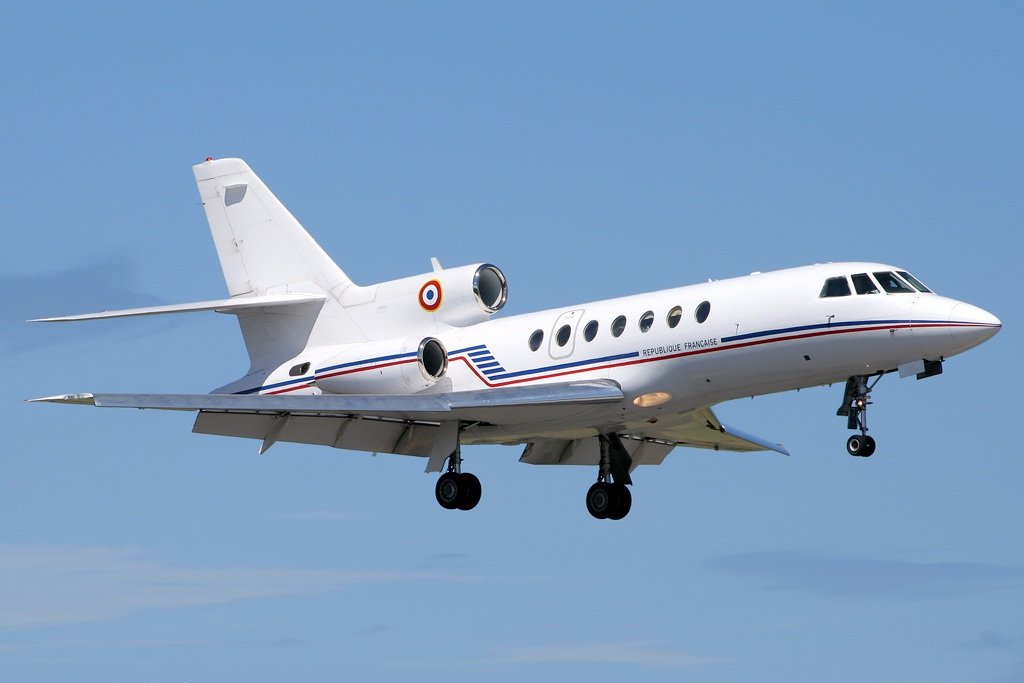
- A Falcon 50 similar to the aircraft prior to its modifications

General information
- National origin: France, Iraq

History
- Introduction date: 9 February 1987

A highly modified Dassault Falcon 50 nicknamed "Suzanna" was operated by the Iraqi Air Force from February 1987 through the Gulf War for anti-shipping attack purposes. The aircraft was the attacking aircraft in the USS Stark incident, in which two Exocet missiles were fired at the United States Navy guided missile cruiser USS Stark, killing 37 sailors.
