= Anti-surface warfare =

Naval combat on the open ocean

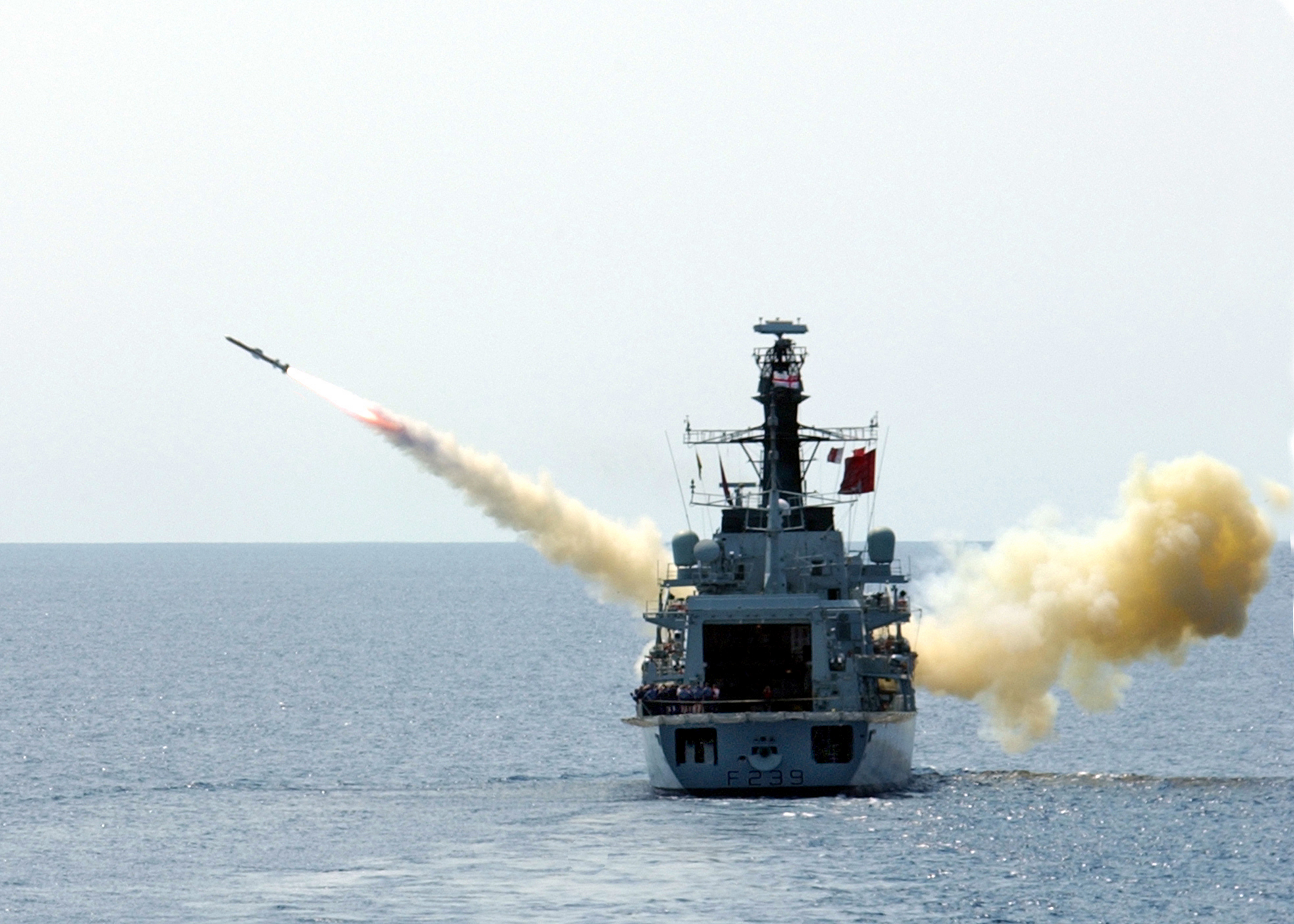
British frigate HMS Richmond launches an AGM-84A Harpoon anti-ship missile during a joint U.S. and British exercise.

Anti-surface warfare (ASuW or ASUW) is the branch of naval warfare concerned with the suppression of surface combatants. More generally, it is any weapons, sensors, or operations intended to attack or limit the effectiveness of an adversary's surface ships. Before the adoption of the submarine and naval aviation, all naval warfare consisted of anti-surface warfare. The distinct concept of an anti-surface warfare capability emerged after World War II, and literature on the subject as a distinct discipline is inherently dominated by the dynamics of the Cold War.

== Categories of anti-surface warfare ==
Anti-surface warfare can be divided into four categories based on the platform from which weapons are launched:

- Air (or aviation): Anti-surface warfare conducted by aircraft. Historically, this was conducted primarily through level- or dive-bombing, strafing runs or air-launching torpedoes (and in some cases by suicide attacks). Today, air ASuW is generally conducted by stand-off attacks using salvo launches of air-launched cruise missiles (ALCM) or anti-ship missiles (AShM).
- Surface: Anti-surface warfare conducted by warships. These vessels can use torpedoes, guns, surface-to-surface missiles, or mines. Unmanned aerial vehicles (UAVs) represent an emerging technology. Asymmetric methods include the suicide boat.
- Submarine: Anti-surface warfare conducted by submarines. Historically, this was conducted using torpedoes and deck guns. More recently, the submarine-launched cruise missile (SLCM) has become a preferred anti-ship weapon, offering a significantly longer range.
- Shore/Space: Historically, this refers to shore bombardment from coastal artillery, including cannons. Shore-based cruise or ballistic missiles are more common. Further, ground-controlled satellites may provide data on fleet movements.

Anti-ship missiles include the BrahMos, Harpoon, RBS-15, P-500 Bazalt, Penguin and Exocet.

== History ==
Following the results of the Battle of Taranto and the Battle of Midway during World War II, the primary combatant ship type was the fleet aircraft carrier. After World War II, the ASuW concept primarily involved the multiple carrier battle groups fielded by the United States Navy, against which the Soviet Union designed specialized strategies that did not equate to a 1:1 match of designs.

Broadly speaking, military planners in the US after World War II envisioned that a Warsaw Pact invasion of Western Europe would require a massive convoy effort to Europe to supply allied forces in theatre. Against this necessity of logistical and combat support, the Soviet Union expanded its submarine fleet, which in the event of hostilities may have been sufficient to deny the supply of material to the theatre. As military strategists often design counter-strategies to meet the capabilities of the rival force, the West then responded with the construction of SOSUS lines to track Soviet submarines.

From the air, Soviet naval aviation had ASuW capabilities. The Tupolev Tu-16 Badger G was armed with anti-ship missiles, followed by the Tupolev Tu-22M Backfire supersonic maritime strike bomber. Even the prop-driven Tu-142, primarily designed for anti-submarine warfare (ASW), could and was armed with anti-ship missiles.

Following the end of the Cold War, ASuW still involves asymmetries, which may for now be more pronounced.

== Air ASuW ==
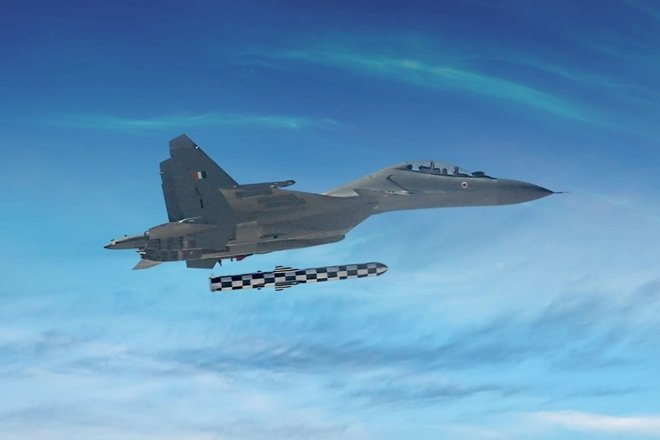
Su-30MKI with BrahMos-ER

After the development of reliable, long-range, guided missiles, air ASuW was imagined to consist of a mass attack by high-speed jet aircraft launching a sufficient number of missiles to overwhelm the air defences of a fleet. Some commentators believed that this capability was consistently underestimated. Exocet anti-ship missile strikes against the Royal Navy during the Falklands War even resulted in the adoption of 'Exocet' as a slang term for a 'sharp, devastating and surprising attack.' The USS Stark incident showed a medium-sized power could significantly damage a modern frigate, with the attack of a single plane on a single ship capable of inflicting heavy damage, let alone the scenario of a multi-ship flight.

The same advantages that made planes so successful against surface ships in World War II are largely still existent. Aircraft can attack in large numbers with little warning and can carry multiple weapons that are each capable of disabling a ship. While warships are able to carry powerful defensive technologies the need to destroy every incoming missile leaves them at a disadvantage. Missiles and supersonic aircraft are very difficult targets to hit and even the most advanced systems cannot provide certainty of interception. During the Cold War the gulf was at its most pronounced, with saturation missile attacks a major concern but the gulf has closed a little in recent time. The advent of phased array radar on ships allow them to track and target a far larger number of targets at one time, increasing the number of missiles needed to saturate defences. The arrival of vertical launching systems allow for dozens of SAMs to be launched almost simultaneously from each ship, a substantial advance over older missile launchers that could only fire one or two missiles before reloading. Should salvoes of SAMs fail to destroy a saturation attack, 'soft kill' countermeasures are complemented by the invention of the point-defence close-in weapon system (CIWS), usually a rapid-fire autocannon sometimes paired with a missile system as a last line of defence. Finally the arrival of networked fleet level defence direction using many radars and many launch platforms together to intercept a cloud of missiles allows for better use of defence resources. Previously each ship would have to act individually against a coordinated attack which leads to defensive fire being wasted on the same targets. Networking also brings information from airborne radar, giving vastly longer range than any ship board radar could achieve due to the radar horizon.

Additionally modern communication and intelligence tools make carrier fleets harder to attack than in previous decades. The challenge for a carrier in the 1970s was in effectively using its air arm against incoming bombers. Fighters could cause huge casualties in a bomber force, but their comparatively low range and loiter time made it impossible to keep a constant combat air patrol over hundreds of miles of ocean. The range of anti-ship missiles also typically put bombers out of range of fighters launching once a raid was detected, nullifying a major part of the fleet's anti-air defences. The ability to bring real time intelligence from long range radars and satellite imaging to the fleet better allows fighters to be used against attackers in the air.

These improvements do not make a fleet impervious to missile attack but do increase a fleet's ability to defend itself and the number of attackers needed to saturate defences. Attackers retain the advantage because a fleet is still relatively static and needs to be successful against every incoming missile to avoid significant losses while attackers only need to achieve a few hits to make an attack successful. The major change is that attackers now need to invest more resources into each attack. Larger formations of aircraft are needed to successfully saturate defences, but if this can be achieved then the aircraft will cause very significant damage. Even a single missile may be able to penetrate defences and sink a ship and even the most successful defence systems cannot guarantee an interception, simply a higher likelihood of one.

== Surface ASuW ==
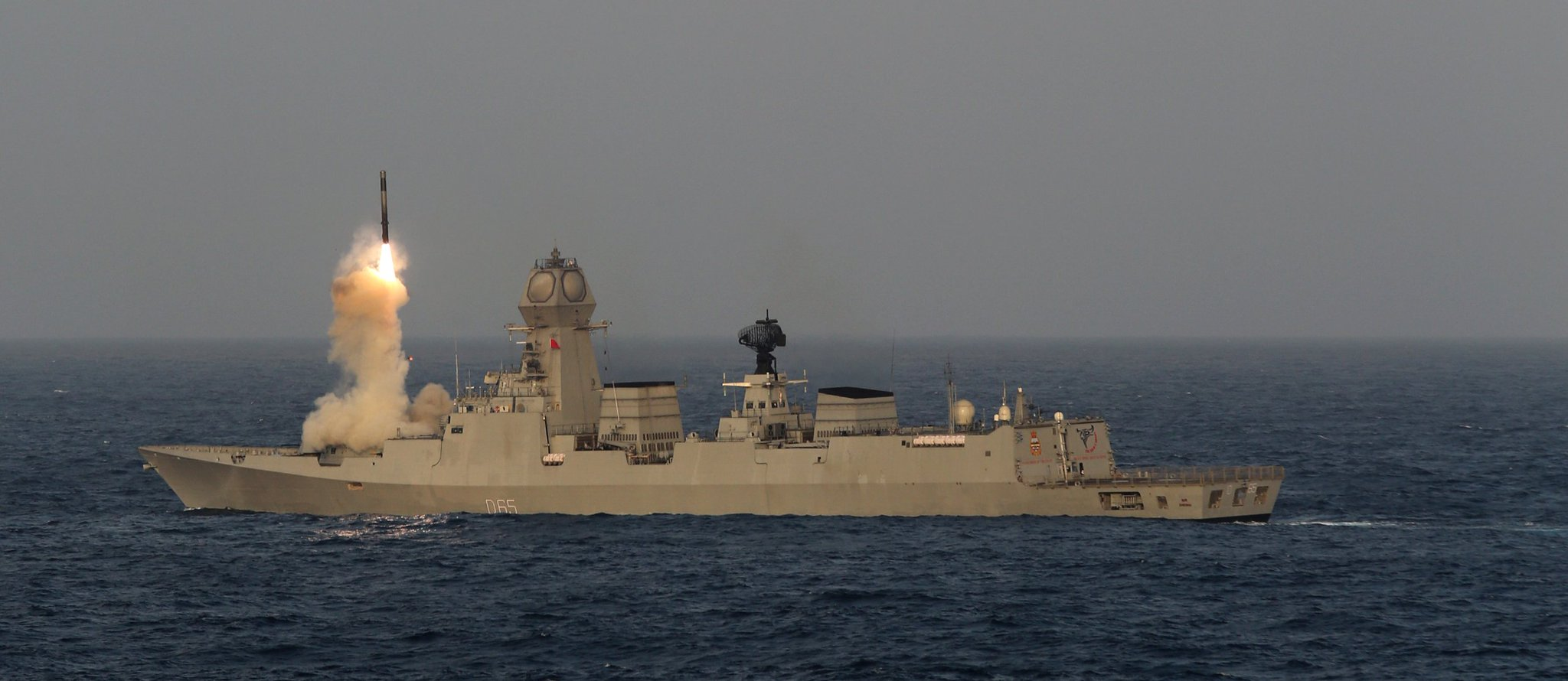
BrahMos fired from INS Chennai

Most naval vessels today are equipped with long range anti-surface missiles such as Brahmos, Harpoon and Exocet which are capable of crippling or destroying enemy ships with a single hit. These can be fired from vertical launch systems or from stand alone launch tubes and are designed to attack other warships. Smaller ships such as the US Navy's littoral combat ship make use of smaller missiles, such as the AGM-114 Hellfire, in the surface-to-surface role that are less suited to attack warships but are still dangerous against fast attack craft or smugglers and pirates as well as land targets.

A surface ship has several key disadvantages as a ship-to-ship missile platform compared to other combatants. Being close to the surface substantially reduces radar range due to the radar horizon which makes it harder to find targets and decreases the maximum range that a missile could be usefully launched at. Also, launching from low altitude costs more fuel than air launch, further decreasing a missile's potential range. However ships can carry far more missiles than any other platform and are thus able to attack more targets or continue an engagement for longer than other platforms.

While ships do retain a robust anti-ship missile armament the ubiquity of such missiles makes an engagement with anti-ship missiles between surface ships fairly unlikely because for one ship to launch its missiles it would have to bring itself within range of the enemy's missiles. Even with surprise the flight time of such missiles is long enough for an enemy to return fire before being hit, making such an engagement extremely dangerous without some additional advantage. The Battle of Latakia during the Yom Kippur War saw Israeli missile boats sink an equal number of Syrian boats by using electronic counter measures and chaff to successfully avoid missile fire, but modern missiles typically have additional guidance systems that make such defences much less effective. In a modern conflict anti-surface missiles would more likely be used against merchant shipping or auxiliary ships and only against similarly armed vessels when no other weapons are available. The arrival of networked weapon systems do potentially offer surface-to-surface missiles way to launch, using radar data from an aircraft or UAV to target missiles over the horizon and engage ships without exposing the launcher to retaliation although such systems are yet to be deployed.

One recent advance in surface to surface weaponry is the modification of RIM-66 Standard anti-air missiles to attack surface targets. Although not as powerful as a dedicated anti-ship missile they are extremely fast and agile and better able to penetrate anti-missile defences. Additionally as many more surface-to-air missiles are typically carried on every vessel this increases a ship's potential firepower many times over. While an Arleigh Burke-class destroyer typically carries eight Harpoons ready to fire, it carries forty or more Standard missiles in its vertical launch cells. This also presents a Standard armed ship with the potential to attack a long range target without necessarily trying to sink it, something very valuable against non-military targets.

While naval guns have largely been supplanted by missiles, guns remain a part of many ships' weaponry. Weapons such as the 5-inch Mark 45 gun remain in service to provide artillery support against land targets but also with a function against surface ships. Missiles are typically a better weapon in terms of their destructive potential but cannon shells are much harder (if not impossible) to intercept with anti-missile defence systems and likely will not be seen on the defender's radar, providing a potential advantage for a surprise attacker. Equally, guns do not require a radar lock to fire, giving them utility against stealth vessels or those too small to be detected.

== Submarine ASuW ==
Undersea versus fleet action is commonly described as a "cat-and-mouse" game, where submarines seek to escape detection long enough to engage in a punishing strike against the much more valuable aircraft carrier fleet groups. Early Soviet submarine designs could be heard "across the Atlantic," but by the late 1980s, many advanced designs were approaching sound-output equivalent to a body of water the size of the sub. P-3 Orions or other ASW maritime patrol planes could deploy magnetic anomaly detectors or disposable sonobuoys, against which the concept of a submarine firing a SAM was generally considered a poor trade-off (the revelation of the submarine's location was not generally considered worth the possible hit on a single plane). However, the concept of the submarine firing on the plane has been revived with Germany's Type 209 diesel submarines.

Submarines seeking to engage in ASuW can also be targeted by other submarines, resulting in wholly undersea combat.

== Shore and space ASuW ==
Shore-based assets may have provided the decisive edge in surface warriors, with constraints imposed by range of such assets. Furthermore, satellites controlled from ground stations could provide information on enemy fleet movements.

== Post Cold War ==
In the post-Cold War era, UAVs and asymmetric threats such as the suicide boat are adding additional complexity to the ASuW discipline.
