= Hebron, Illinois =

Hebron, Illinois Mead Station
- Village
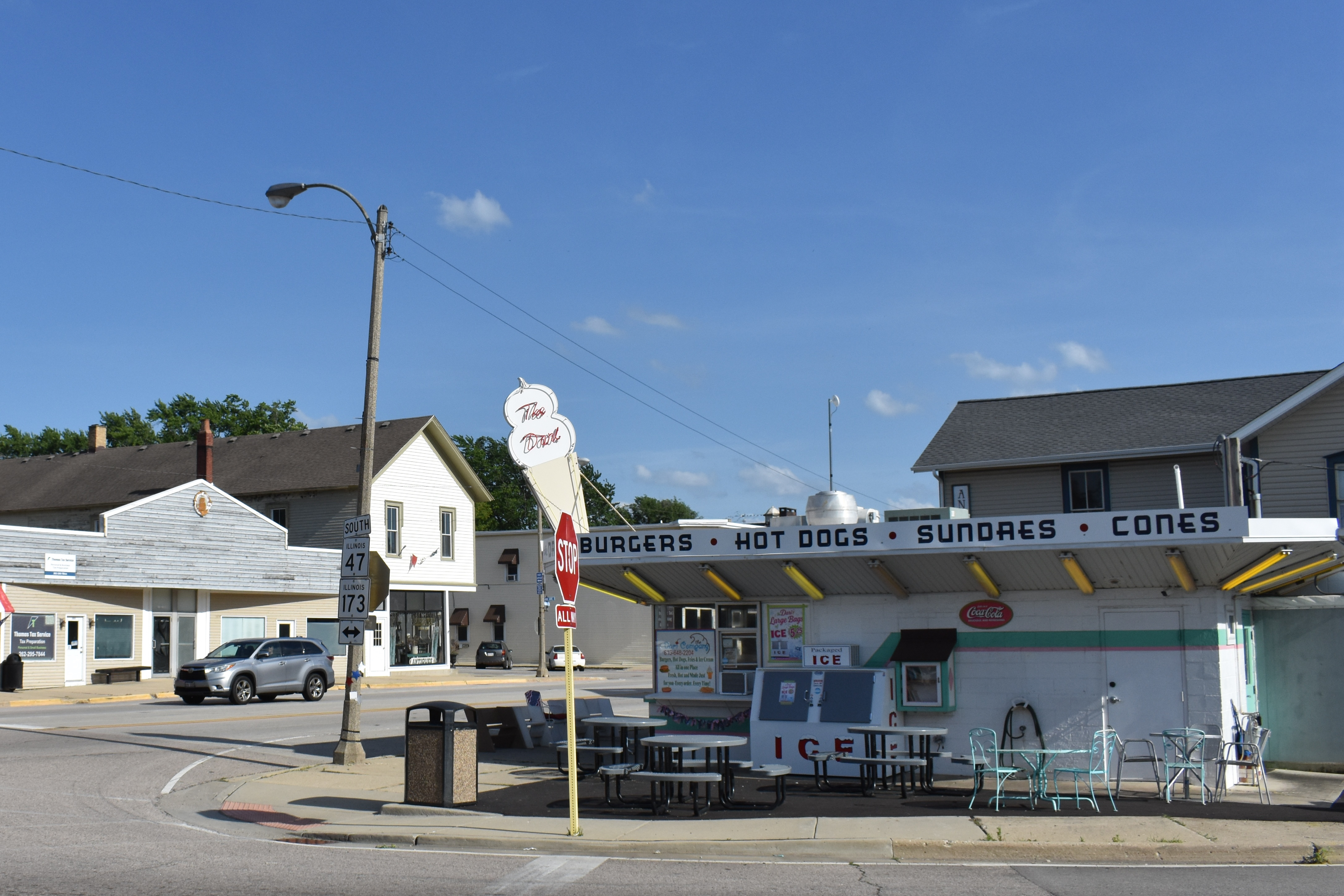
- Hebron in July 2026

- Seal

- Location of Hebron in McHenry County, Illinois.
- Coordinates: 42°27′55″N 88°26′04″W
- Country: United States
- State: Illinois
- County: McHenry
- Township: Hebron
- Founded: 1895

Area
  - Total: 1.93 sq mi (5.00 km^{2})
  - Land: 1.93 sq mi (5.00 km^{2})
  - Water: 0 sq mi (0.00 km^{2})
- Elevation: 925 ft (282 m)

Population (2020)
  - Total: 1,368
  - Density: 708.3/sq mi (273.47/km^{2})
- Time zone: UTC-6 (CST)
  - Summer (DST): UTC-5 (CDT)
- ZIP code: 60034
- Area code: 815
- FIPS code: 17-33851
- GNIS feature ID: 2398482
- Website: www.villageofhebron.org

Hebron (/ˈhiːbrɪn/ HEE-brihn) is a village in McHenry County, Illinois, United States. It is a commuter village within the Chicago metropolitan area. Per the 2020 census, the population was 1,368.

== Geography ==
According to the 2010 census, Hebron has a total area of 1.95 square miles (5.05 km^{2}), all land.

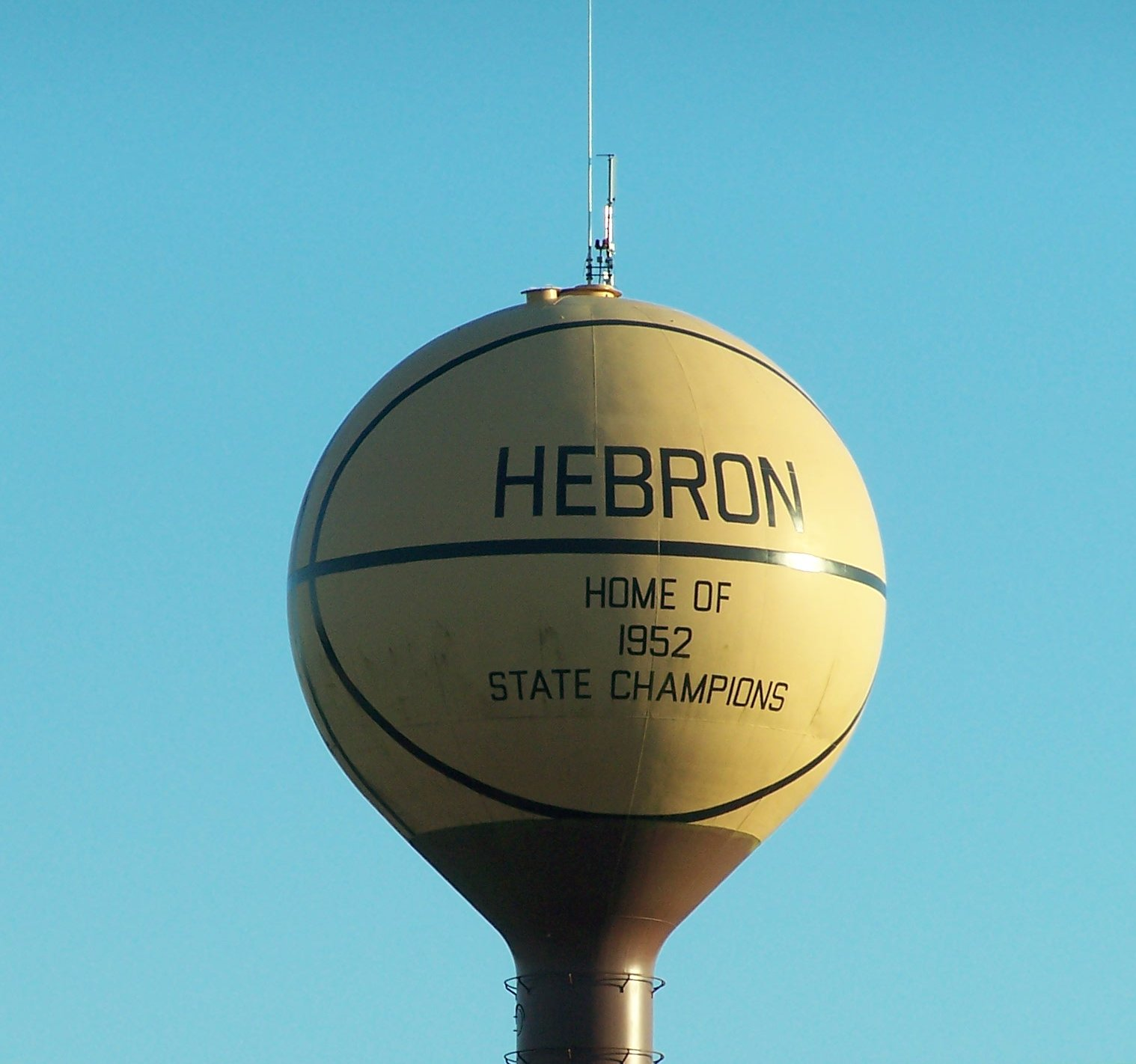
The Hebron water tower, painted to resemble a basketball

=== Major streets ===
- Main Street
- Maple Avenue
- Price Road
- Bigelow Avenue

== Demographics ==
Historical population
Census	Pop.	Note	%±
1880	137		—
1900	511		—
1910	644		26.0%
1920	631		−2.0%
1930	608		−3.6%
1940	627		3.1%
1950	696		11.0%
1960	701		0.7%
1970	781		11.4%
1980	786		0.6%
1990	809		2.9%
2000	1,038		28.3%
2010	1,216		17.1%
2020	1,368		12.5%
U.S. Decennial Census; 2010 2020

=== Racial and ethnic composition ===
Hebron village, Illinois – Racial and ethnic composition Note: the US Census treats Hispanic/Latino as an ethnic category. This table excludes Latinos from the racial categories and assigns them to a separate category. Hispanics/Latinos may be of any race.
Race / Ethnicity (NH = Non-Hispanic)	Pop 2000	Pop 2010	Pop 2020	% 2000	% 2010	% 2020
White alone (NH)	973	1,052	1,067	93.74%	86.51%	78.00%
Black or African American alone (NH)	4	24	7	0.39%	1.97%	0.51%
Native American or Alaska Native alone (NH)	0	1	1	0.00%	0.08%	0.07%
Asian alone (NH)	1	10	2	0.10%	0.82%	0.15%
Pacific Islander alone (NH)	0	0	0	0.00%	0.00%	0.00%
Other race alone (NH)	5	1	6	0.48%	0.08%	0.44%
Mixed race or Multiracial (NH)	0	12	47	0.00%	0.99%	3.44%
Hispanic or Latino (any race)	55	116	238	5.30%	9.54%	17.40%
Total	1,038	1,216	1,368	100.00%	100.00%	100.00%

=== 2020 census ===
As of the 2020 census, Hebron had a population of 1,368. The median age was 35.7 years. 25.9% of residents were under the age of 18 and 12.3% were 65 years of age or older. For every 100 females, there were 98.5 males, and for every 100 females age 18 and over, there were 96.9 males age 18 and over.

0.0% of residents lived in urban areas, while 100.0% lived in rural areas.

There were 517 households in Hebron, of which 33.3% had children under the age of 18 living in them. Of all households, 49.3% were married-couple households, 20.1% were households with a male householder and no spouse or partner present, and 24.0% were households with a female householder and no spouse or partner present. About 28.4% of all households were made up of individuals, and 13.0% had someone living alone who was 65 years of age or older.

There were 550 housing units, of which 6.0% were vacant. The homeowner vacancy rate was 0.5% and the rental vacancy rate was 7.2%.

=== 2000 Census ===
As of the census of 2000, there were 1,038 people, 390 households, and 271 families residing in the village. The population density was 1,515.9 inhabitants per square mile (585.3/km^{2}). There were 411 housing units at an average density of 600.2 per square mile (231.7/km^{2}). The racial makeup of the village was 97.78% White, 0.39% African American, 0.10% Asian, 1.16% from other races, and 0.58% from two or more races. Hispanic or Latino of any race were 5.30% of the population.

There were 390 households, out of which 38.5% had children under the age of 18 living with them, 50.0% were married couples living together, 13.6% had a female householder with no husband present, and 30.5% were non-families. 24.9% of all households were made up of individuals, and 8.7% had someone living alone who was 65 years of age or older. The average household size was 2.66 and the average family size was 3.20.

In the village, the population was spread out, with 31.0% under the age of 18, 7.9% from 18 to 24, 32.4% from 25 to 44, 19.5% from 45 to 64, and 9.2% who were 65 years of age or older. The median age was 33 years. For every 100 females, there were 100.4 males. For every 100 females age 18 and over, there were 91.4 males.

The median income for a household in the village was $46,607, and the median income for a family was $53,661. Males had a median income of $41,036 versus $25,272 for females. The per capita income for the village was $18,829. About 3.3% of families and 5.1% of the population were below the poverty line, including 6.1% of those under age 18 and 3.0% of those age 65 or over.

== Fire Protection and EMS ==
The village and surrounding area are protected by the Hebron Alden Greenwood Fire Protection District. The district comprises 20 members that protect 56 square miles (150 km^{2}). The district operates out of one fire station located in Hebron. The district operates two engines, two ambulances, two brush trucks, and two tenders. They average 450 emergency calls a year. The district is part of the MercyHealth EMS System and provides ALS (Advanced Life Support) service to the district.

The district holds their annual pig roast on the second Saturday in September each year at the fire station at 12302 Rte 173 in Hebron.

== Education ==
Alden-Hebron High School is the smallest school to win the Illinois High School Boys Basketball Championship. In 1952, with an enrollment of 98 students, the boys team won the state title with an overtime victory over Quincy with a final score of 64–59. At the time, all Illinois schools competed for a single championship, regardless of enrollment. The town's water tower is painted to look like a basketball in commemoration of the event.

== Notable people ==
- Elmer Bigelow, recipient of the Medal of Honor; died saving his ship in World War II; born and raised in Hebron.
- Tuffy Conn, fullback for the Akron Pros in 1920
- George Dunne, longtime President of the Cook County Board of Commissioners.
- Howie Judson, pitcher for two teams (1948–1954); born in Hebron
