= Elmer Charles Bigelow =

United States Navy Medal of Honor recipient (1920–1945)

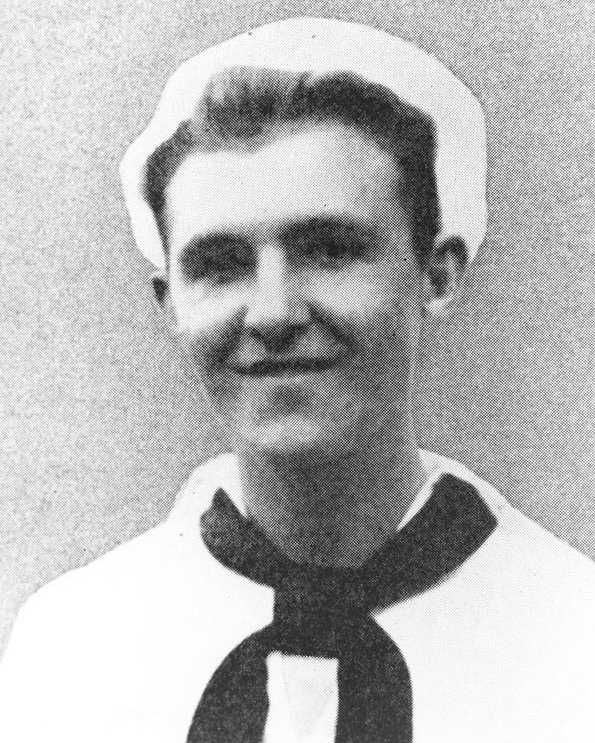
- Watertender Second Class Elmer Charles Bigelow
- Born: July 12, 1920; Hebron, Illinois
- Died: February 15, 1945 (aged 24); Manila Bay, Philippines
- Burial place: Linn-Hebron Cemetery, Hebron, Illinois
- Military career
- Allegiance: United States
- Branch: United States Naval Reserve
- Service years: 1942 – 1945
- Rank: Watertender First Class (posthumous)
- Unit: USS Fletcher (DD-445)
- Conflicts: World War II: Philippines campaign †
- Awards: Medal of Honor

Elmer Charles Bigelow (July 12, 1920 – February 15, 1945) was a United States Navy sailor and a recipient of America's highest military decoration, the Medal of Honor.

== Biography ==
Elmer Charles Bigelow was born in Hebron, Illinois, on July 12, 1920. He enlisted in the Naval Reserve at Chicago, Illinois in September 1942 and received training at Naval Station Great Lakes in North Chicago, Illinois, and at Lawrence, Kansas, before being assigned as a Fireman Third Class on board the destroyer USS Fletcher (DD-445) in June 1943. While serving in that ship, he advanced in rate to watertender second class.

On February 14, 1945, Bigelow's actions averted tragedy on board the USS Fletcher. While assisting minesweeping operations prior to landings on Manila Bay's Corregidor Island, Fletcher was hit by an enemy shell which penetrated the No. 1 gun magazine, igniting several powder cases. Bigelow acted swiftly to extinguish the flames, preventing the fire from spreading, but was mortally wounded in the process.

Bigelow was posthumously awarded the Medal of Honor for his "conspicuous gallantry and intrepidity". Bigelow was buried in Linn-Hebron Cemetery in Hebron, Illinois.

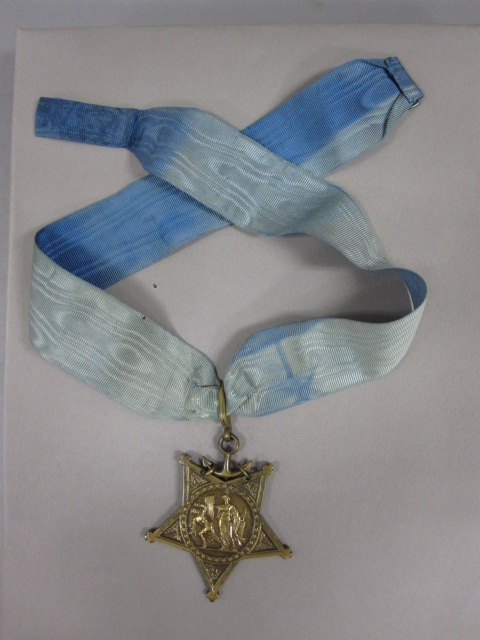
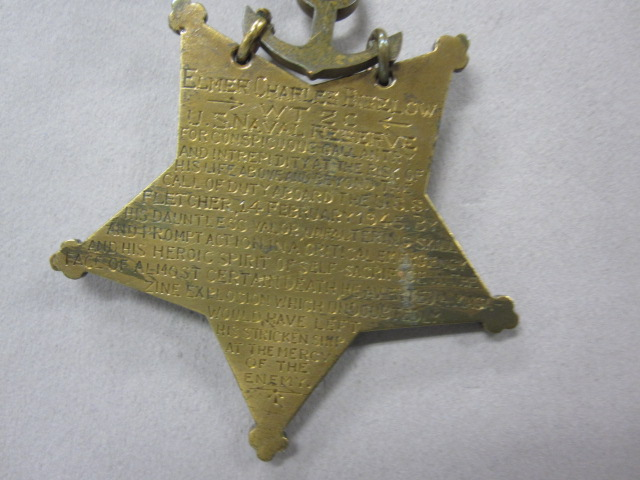
Bigelow's Medal of Honor, front and back

== Namesake ==
The destroyer USS Bigelow (DD-942), 1957–1990, was named in his honor.

== Medal of Honor citation ==
Elmer Bigelow's official Navy Medal of Honor citation is as follows:

For conspicuous gallantry and intrepidity at the risk of his life above and beyond the call of duty while serving on board the U.S.S. Fletcher during action against enemy Japanese forces off Corregidor Island in the Philippines, February 14, 1945. Standing topside when an enemy shell struck the Fletcher, BIGELOW, acting instantly as the deadly projectile exploded into fragments which penetrated the No. 1 gun magazine and set fire to several powder cases, picked up a pair of fire extinguishers and rushed below in a resolute attempt to quell the raging flames. Refusing to waste the precious time required to don rescue-breathing apparatus, he plunged through the blinding smoke billowing out of the magazine hatch and dropped into the blazing compartment. Despite the acrid, burning powder smoke which seared his lungs with every agonizing breath, he worked rapidly and with instinctive sureness and succeeded in quickly extinguishing the fires and in cooling the cases and bulkheads, thereby preventing further damage to the stricken ship. Although he succumbed to his injuries on the following day, BIGELOW, by his dauntless valor, unfaltering skill and prompt action in the critical emergency, had averted a magazine explosion which undoubtedly would have left his ship wallowing at the mercy of the furiously pounding Japanese guns on Corregidor, and his heroic spirit of self-sacrifice in the face of almost certain death enhanced and sustained the highest traditions of the United States Naval Service. He gallantly gave his life in the service of his country.

== See also ==
- List of Medal of Honor recipients for World War II
