= Glenn R. Brindel =

United States Navy officer

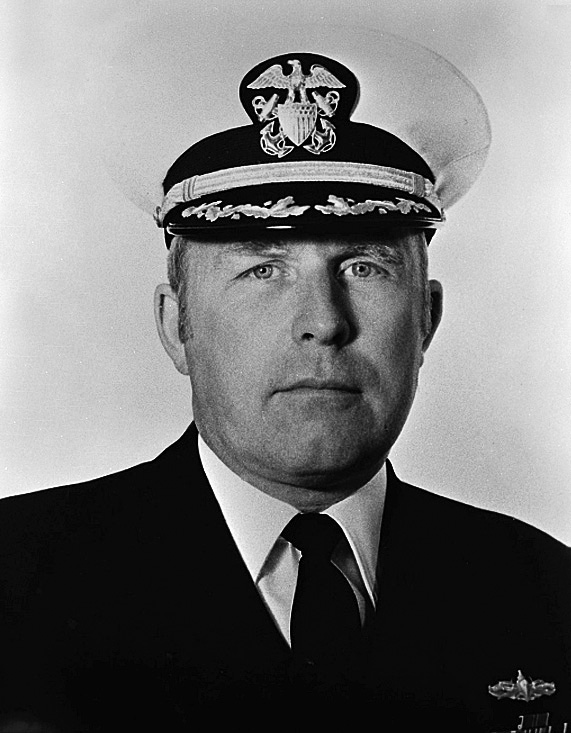
- Born: August 5, 1943 (age 83)
- Military career
- Allegiance: United States of America
- Branch: United States Navy
- Service years: 1965–1987
- Rank: Captain, retired as commander
- Commands: USS Chehalis; USS Stark
- Conflicts: Vietnam War; Operation Game Warden; Tanker War; USS Stark incident
- Awards: Bronze Star; Vietnamese Cross of Gallantry; Meritorious Service Medal

Glenn R. Brindel (born 1943) is a former United States Navy officer. He was the commanding officer of USS Stark and was in command when the ship was attacked and struck by two Exocet missiles in the Persian Gulf on May 17, 1987. The incident review board, led by Rear Admiral Grant Sharp, recommended he be court-martialed for his actions. However, he was relieved of command and given non-judicial punishment by Adm. Frank B. Kelso II, commander of the Atlantic fleet. According to the New York Times, in 1987 he received a letter of reprimand and elected to retire early. He had not served as a captain long enough to retire at that grade, so he had to retire at the rank of commander. The U.S. Naval Register, however, lists Brindel as retiring October 2, 1990, as a captain. 37 sailors were killed in the attack.

== Early life and education ==
Brindel, a native of Dormont, Pennsylvania, near Pittsburgh, was born in 1943 and was 43 at the time of the attack.

== Career ==
Brindel was commissioned in 1965 after graduating from Pennsylvania State University. He served as weapons officer on USS Garrett County from October 1965 to March 1967 during part of Operation Game Warden. He received his first command in 1973, USS Chehalis, and received medals for bravery during the Vietnam War, including the Bronze Star, Vietnamese Cross of Gallantry and Meritorious Service Medal. He had served as an instructor at the United States Naval Academy for more than three years until 1978. He was the executive officer of USS Bigelow for two years starting in 1978. After that, he served two years with the Office of the Chief of Naval Operations working on the staff of the director of Research, Development, Test and Evaluation. Then he served two years as a project manager with the Naval Sea Systems Command. He took command of Stark in June 1984 and was relieved of command and received non-judicial punishment for the 1987 Iraqi missile attack incident.

== Later life ==
Brindel has been a real estate agent in the Hampton Roads, Virginia, area since his retirement from the Navy.
