= Howie Judson =

American baseball player (1925–2020)

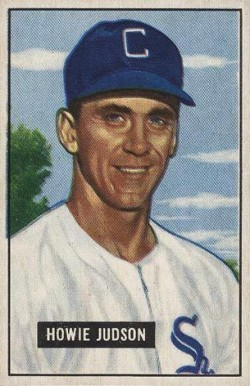
- Pitcher
- Born: February 16, 1925; Hebron, Illinois, U.S.
- Died: August 18, 2020 (aged 95); Winter Haven, Florida, U.S.
- Batted: Right Threw: Right

MLB debut
- April 22, 1948, for the Chicago White Sox

Last MLB appearance
- September 25, 1954, for the Cincinnati Redlegs

MLB statistics
- Win–loss record: 17–37
- Earned run average: 4.29
- Strikeouts: 204
- Stats at Baseball Reference

Teams
- Chicago White Sox (1948–1952); Cincinnati Redlegs (1953–1954)

Howard Kolls Judson (February 16, 1925 – August 18, 2020) was an American professional baseball player. He was a right-handed pitcher in the Major Leagues from 1948 to 1954 for the Chicago White Sox and Cincinnati Redlegs. Altogether, the 6 ft 1 in (1.85 m), 195 lb (88 kg) hurler played 14 seasons (1946–59) of professional baseball, including minor league service. Born in Hebron, Illinois, Judson attended the University of Illinois at Urbana–Champaign. He served very briefly in the United States Navy during World War II receiving an honorable discharge after just over three months due to his left eye injury problem.

Judson lost 37 of his 54 Major League decisions, for a winning percentage of .315. In 1949, he lost 14 of his 15 decisions for the sixth-place White Sox, and never posted a winning record in the Majors. In 207 MLB games played, 48 as a starting pitcher, he surrendered 619 hits and 319 bases on balls in 615 innings of work, with 204 strikeouts. However, he did have some success in the minors, winning 16 games (losing eight) for the 1947 Waterloo White Hawks of the Class B Illinois–Indiana–Iowa League, and fashioning a perfect 11–0 mark for the 1953 Tulsa Oilers of the Double-A Texas League.

Judson died on August 18, 2020, in Winter Haven, Florida at the age of 95.
