= USS Ainsworth =

1972 Knox-class frigate

Coordinates: 38°24′45″N 27°02′05″E

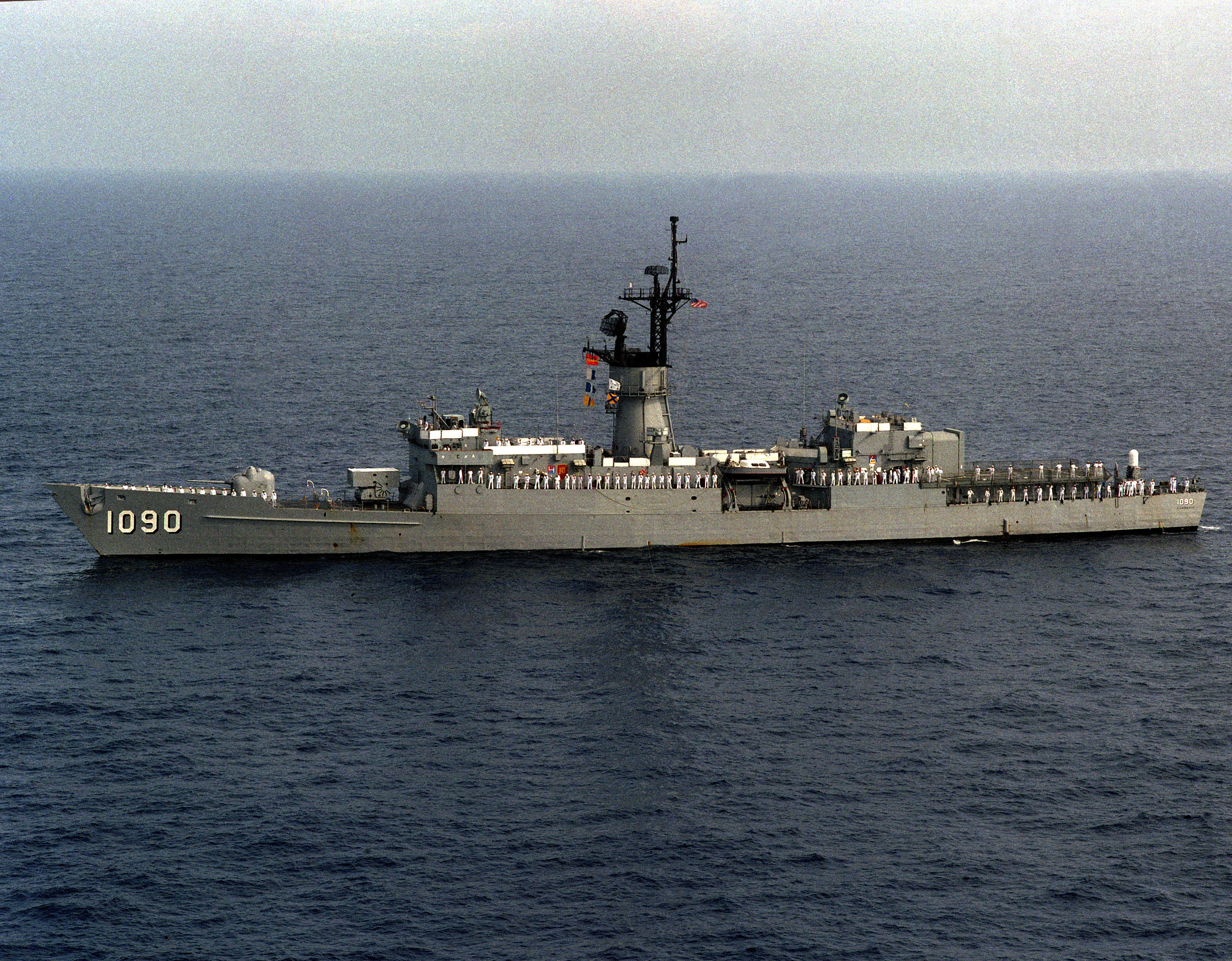
- USS Ainsworth (FF-1090)

History

United States
- Name: USS Ainsworth
- Namesake: Walden L. Ainsworth
- Ordered: 25 August 1966
- Builder: Avondale Shipyard, Westwego, Louisiana
- Laid down: 11 June 1971
- Launched: 15 April 1972
- Acquired: 1 February 1973
- Commissioned: 31 March 1973
- Reclassified: FF-1090, 30 June 1975
- Decommissioned: 27 May 1994
- Motto: Parata Pugnare
- Fate: Leased to Turkey, 27 May 1994
- Stricken: 11 January 1995
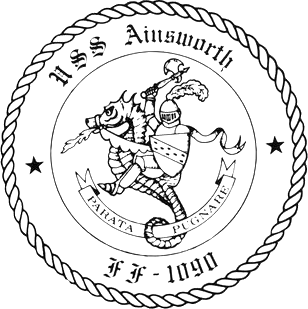
- Badge

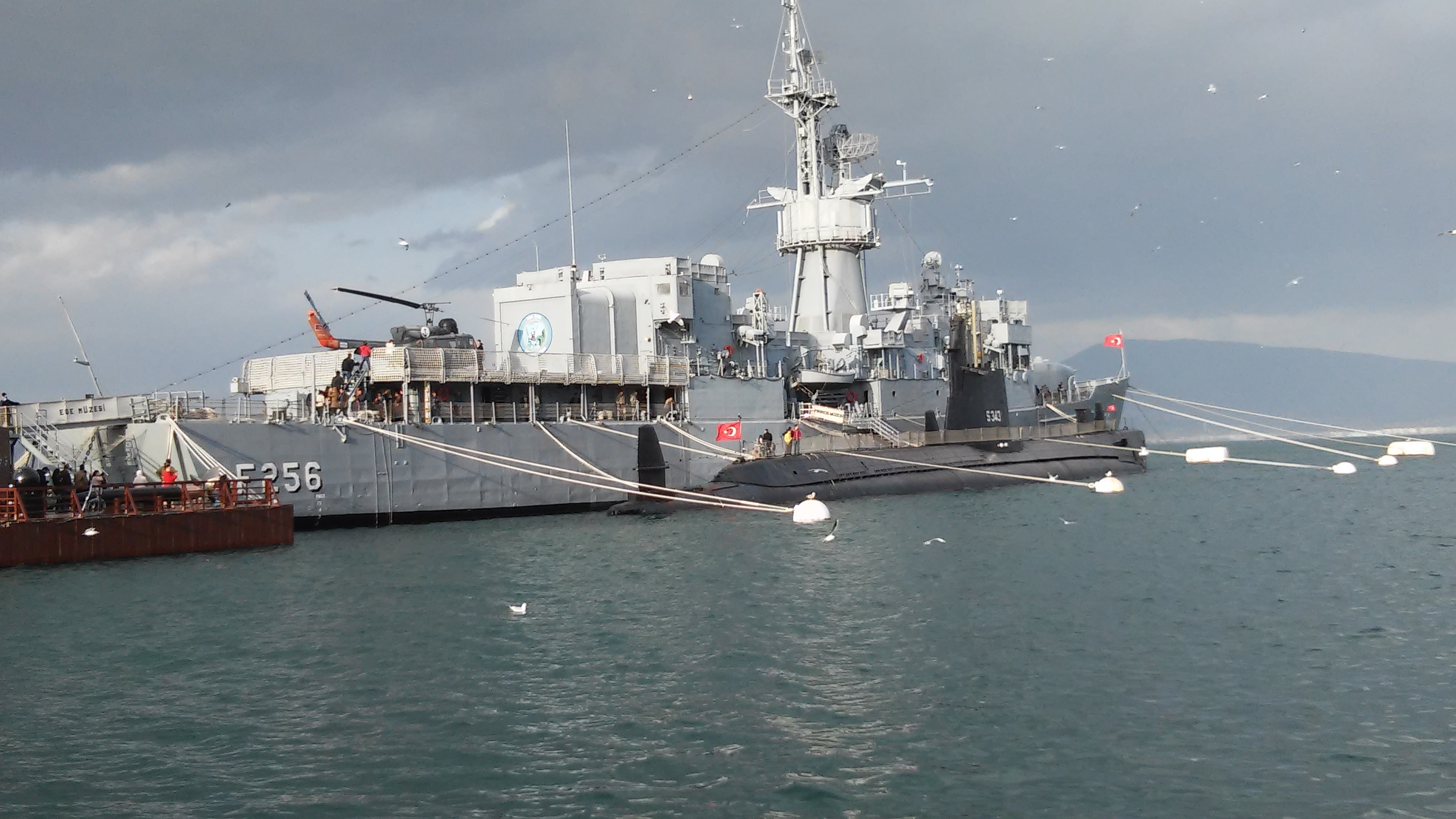
- TCG Ege in İnciraltı Sea Museum

Turkey
- Name: TCG Ege
- Namesake: Aegean Sea
- Acquired: 27 May 1994
- Decommissioned: 21 March 2005
- Identification: F-256
- Fate: Museum ship, Izmir, Turkey

General characteristics
- Class & type: Knox-class frigate
- Displacement: 3,201 tons (4,182 tons full load)
- Length: 438 ft (134 m)
- Beam: 46 ft 9 in (14.25 m)
- Draft: 24 ft 9 in (7.54 m)
- Propulsion: 2 × CE 1200psi boilers; 1 Westinghouse geared turbine; 1 shaft, 35,000 shp (26,000 kW)
- Speed: over 27 knots (50 km/h; 31 mph)
- Complement: 18 officers, 267 enlisted
- Sensors & processing systems: AN/SPS-40 Air Search Radar; AN/SPS-67 Surface Search Radar; AN/SQS-26 Sonar; AN/SQR-18 Towed array sonar system; Mk68 Gun Fire Control System
- Electronic warfare & decoys: AN/SLQ-32 Electronics Warfare System
- Armament: one Mk-16 8 cell missile launcher for ASROC and Harpoon missiles; one Mk-42 5-inch/54 caliber gun; Mark 46 torpedoes from four single tube launchers); one Phalanx CIWS
- Aircraft carried: one SH-2 Seasprite (LAMPS I) helicopter

USS Ainsworth (DE/FF-1090) is a retired Knox-class frigate named for Vice Admiral Walden L. Ainsworth (1886–1960). Ainsworth (DE-1090) was laid down at Westwego, Louisiana, on 11 June 1971 by Avondale Shipyards, Inc.; launched on 15 April 1972; sponsored by Mrs. Katharine Gardner Ainsworth, the widow of Vice Admiral Ainsworth; and commissioned on 31 March 1973 at the Norfolk Naval Shipyard, Portsmouth, Virginia.

== Service history ==
=== Initial cruise ===
Following fitting out, the new ocean escort departed her home port, Norfolk, on 11 June and headed for Port Everglades, Florida, to prepare for sensor tests and calibration. She then proceeded to Guantanamo Bay Naval Base in Cuba for shakedown training. While the members of her crew were becoming familiar with their ship and their duties, Ainsworth visited Port-au-Prince, Haiti, and then proceeded on to La Guaira, Venezuela, where she joined warships of four other navies in a voyage to Maracaibo to commemorate the sesquicentennial of the Battle of Lake Maracaibo, a naval victory which helped Venezuela to win her independence.

En route home, the ship made recruiting stops at New Orleans and Miami before reaching Norfolk on 16 August and beginning preparation for her post-shakedown overhaul. She got underway on 16 October and, two days later, entered the Charleston Naval Shipyard in South Carolina. Less than a week after the work started, it was interrupted by rising tension in the Middle East; and Ainsworth was placed in a 36-hour ready standby status so that she would be able, if necessary, to race to the Mediterranean. However, the stressful situation soon eased sufficiently for her to resume the repairs which were completed late in February 1974.

The escort operated along the east coast and in the West Indies until 18 July when she began a voyage in which she would circumnavigate South America, sailing south via the West Indies to Brazil and then proceeding on down the coast. Rio de Janeiro and Montevideo were among her ports of call before the ship rounded Cape Horn. While returning north in the Pacific, she visited Valparaíso and Callao before reentering the Atlantic through the Panama Canal. After stops at La Guaira and Cumona, Venezuela, she proceeded home via Roosevelt Roads, Puerto Rico, and reached Norfolk on 16 December 1974.

=== 1970s ===
Following leave and upkeep, the ship underwent tender availability alongside USS Puget Sound and then prepared for operations in the Caribbean which lasted until 24 March 1975 when Ainsworth again headed home. She arrived in Hampton Roads on 27 March and, but for a midshipmen training cruise during the latter half of June and a run back to the West Indies from 22 to 29 August, she worked in the Norfolk–Virginia Capes area until early autumn. During that summer the ship was reclassified a frigate and redesignated FF-1090 on 30 June 1975.

On 3 October, the ocean escort headed across the Atlantic for her first visit to the Mediterranean, beginning a routine of alternating deployments to the 6th Fleet with operations on the east coast of the United States and in the Caribbean. She reported to the 6th Fleet at Rota, Spain, on 13 October and relieved the frigate Capodanno. During the remainder of the month, she visited Tangier, Morocco; conducted operations in the western Mediterranean; and made a port call at Málaga, Spain.

She left the Mediterranean on the last day of October and devoted the next three weeks to Operation "Ocean Safari" in the northern Atlantic and then spent from 22 to 28 November at Portsmouth, England, in company with the frigate Bowen. She headed back toward Gibraltar on the latter day and rejoined the 6th Fleet at Rota on 3 December. Her operations during the next five months took her almost the full length of the Mediterranean as she visited ports in Italy, Greece, Turkey, France, and Spain before she headed home on 26 April 1976.

After reaching Norfolk on 5 May, the frigate operated in the Hampton Roads–Virginia Capes area for the remainder of the year with the exception of a trip up the Chesapeake Bay to Annapolis in late September and early October for a visit to the Naval Academy. On 17 January 1977, Ainsworth sailed for the Caribbean. She stopped at Guantánamo Bay, Cuba; Fort-de-France, Martinique; and San Juan, Puerto Rico, before taking part in Exercise "CARIBEX 1–77" from 11 to 21 February.

Upon her return to Norfolk on George Washington's Birthday, the ship readied herself for another deployment to European waters and got underway across the Atlantic on the last day of March. After reaching Rota on 12 April, she sailed for Skaramangas, Greece on 16 April; reached there on 21 April; and remained at that port for a month before proceeding via Souda Bay, Crete, to the Ionian Sea. There she took part in a series of 6th Fleet operations which—but for runs to nearby ports—kept her busy until mid-July.

On 15 July, she sailed for the Levant and visited Haifa, Israel, from 20 to 24 July. Then, after sailing westward, she reached Naples on 29 July and underwent a tender availability there until 11 August. Three days at Augusta Bay, Sicily, preceded her participation in 6th Fleet Exercise "National Week XXIII" from 16 to 22 August. During her ensuing operations in the western Mediterranean, she called at ports in France, Spain (Alicante), and Portugal (Lisbon) before sailing for home on 10 October.

The ship reached Hampton Roads on 21 October and remained there until getting underway on 28 November for MARCOTT 3/77, a joint exercise with Canadian warships which kept her busy until she returned to Norfolk in mid-December. The frigate devoted the full month of February 1978 to the Atlantic Fleet's annual readiness exercise and then spent the first 12 days of March in upkeep at Norfolk before representing her sister frigates in Exercise "Shamrock," a combined weapons test and training exercise. carrier Dwight D. Eisenhower, guided missile cruiser Virginia, and destroyer Peterson also took part in this demonstration which was observed by President Jimmy Carter. On St. Patrick's Day, she arrived at Jacksonville, Florida, and spent the rest of March in that vicinity supporting advanced underway training of surface warfare officers. She returned to Norfolk on 1 April to serve off the Virginia Capes as deck landing qualifications ship for LAMPS Squadrons 30, 32, and 34. During the five-day procedure 725 landings were made while 94 pilots were qualified. Then, following further operations in the Norfolk-Virginia Capes area, Ainsworth entered the Philadelphia Naval Shipyard for her first regular overhaul which kept her busy until 1 March 1979.

Underway for her home port the following day, she arrived at Norfolk on 3 March and conducted local operations until getting underway on 10 May for refresher training in the Caribbean. This West Indies cruise, which lasted through mid-summer, took her to the Bahamas, Guantánamo Bay, Haiti, Puerto Rico, and the Virgin Islands. Then, with fighting skills again honed to a keen edge, she returned to Norfolk on 23 August and operated locally until putting to sea on 1 October for 12 days of combined underway training exercises along the east coast and in waters off Puerto Rico. Upon returning home on 13 October, the ship began preparations for another deployment, got underway on 10 November, and proceeded via the Azores to Rota. After entering the Mediterranean, she continued on—via the Suez Canal and the Red Sea—to the Persian Gulf and transited the Strait of Hormuz on 9 December. While in the Middle East she visited Jidda, Saudi Arabia; Djibouti, Afars and Issas; and Sitra, Bahrein. Ainsworth departed the latter port on 22 December 1979 and began 84 consecutive days of service underway at sea ready to act in any emergency which might arise in the area which might result from the prolonged crises precipitated by Iran's capture and occupation of the American Embassy in Tehran and the imprisonment of the American citizens who worked there.

=== 1980s ===
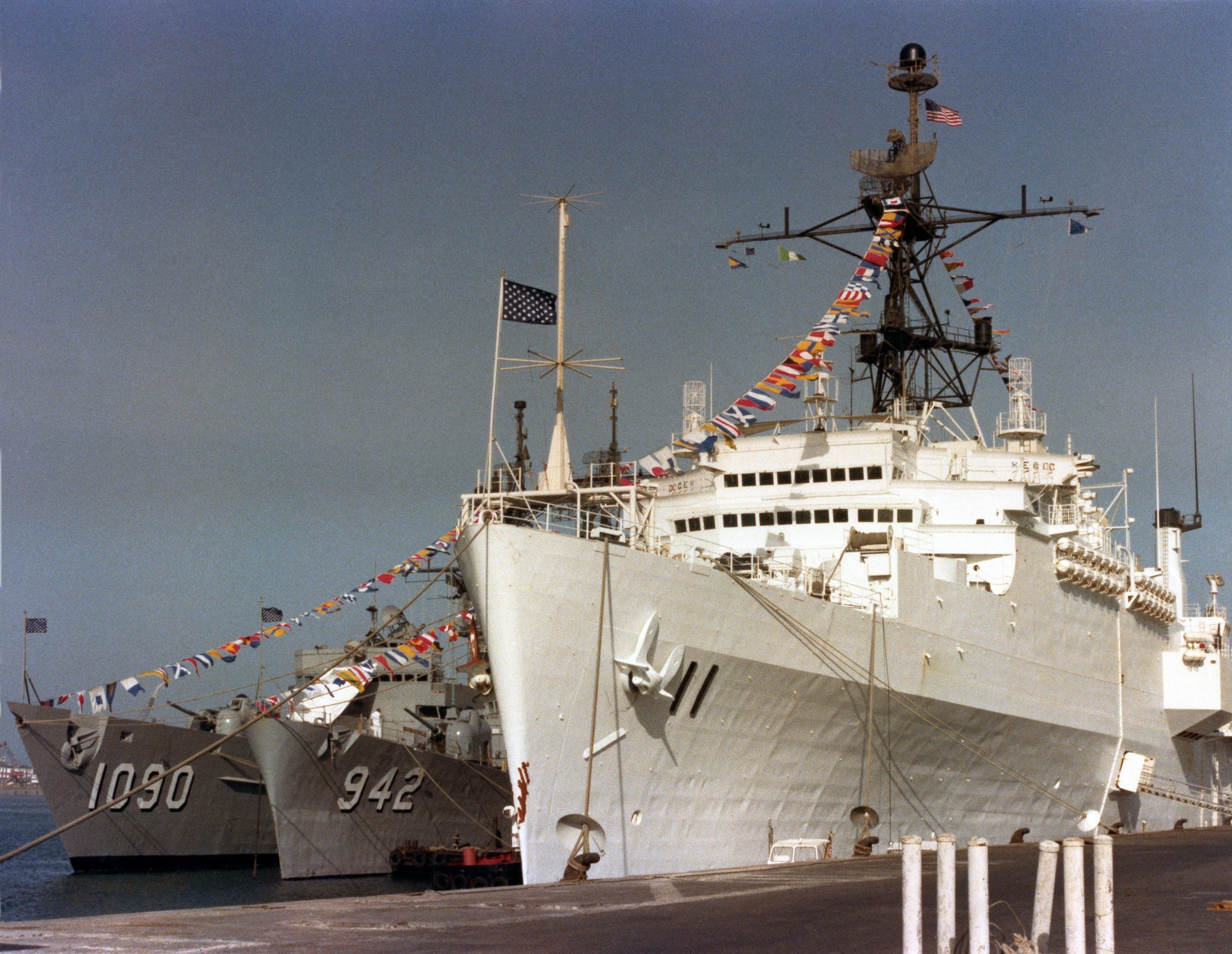
Left to Right: Ainsworth, Bigelow, and Coronado pier-side in Mina Salman, Bahrain in the summer of 1981. Coronado, the flagship of the U.S. Middle East Forces at the time, was painted white as is tradition for flagships since the Great White Fleet.

On 11 March 1980, the ship finally put into Muscat, Oman, for fuel as she began her voyage homeward. Three days later, Ainsworth topped off her oil bunkers at Djibouti and continued on through the Red Sea, the Suez Canal, and the Mediterranean, to Gibraltar. Following brief stops in the Azores and at Bermuda, she ended the deployment upon her arrival at Norfolk on 17 April.

After a month of leave and upkeep, the ship took part in COMPUTEX 4–80 and carried out naval gunfire support qualifications. At the end of a four-day visit to Port-au-Prince, Haiti, she got underway for home on 19 June and proceeded via Port Everglades to Norfolk which she reached on the 23d. Two days later, she entered the Norfolk Naval Shipyard for a restricted availability which lasted until 11 August. The vessel then began preparations for overseas movement and got underway on the 29th for Exercise "United Effort" and "Teamwork 80" which kept her at sea in the North Atlantic and the North Sea until she arrived at Copenhagen, Denmark, on 24 September. She also put into Oslo, Norway, Leith and Rosyth, Scotland, and Portsmouth, England, en route home which she reached on 2 November.

After remaining in the Norfolk area into the new year, the frigate sailed on 6 January 1981 for Narragansett Bay, Rhode Island, where she supported submarine training until 9 January. She then prepared for READEX 1–81 and gunfire qualifications which kept her busy until 17 February when work began on making the ship ready for another deployment to the Middle East. She got underway on 18 March and reached Rota on 29 March. After transiting the Suez Canal and the Red Sea from 14 to 17 April, she entered the Indian Ocean and headed back toward the Persian Gulf. After refueling at Sitra, Bahrain, she operated near the Strait of Hormuz until 11 May and then took part in Exercise PASSEX in the Gulf of Oman with the British vessels Bacchante and Minerva. Next came battle group operations with the aircraft carrier America and a visit to Kenya. En route to Mombasa, the ship crossed the equator on 23 May. Upon finishing another PASSEX on 3 June, an exercise conducted with two fast patrol boats of the Kenya Navy, she sailed for Sitra, Bahrain, in company with the aircraft carrier Kitty Hawk, en route to the Persian Gulf, and conducted operations with that carrier's battle group.

Following almost a month's labors in the vicinity of the Persian Gulf, she sailed for Djibouti on 8 July—beginning the first leg of her voyage home—and took part in further exercises with Bacchante and Minerva in the Gulf of Oman and in operations with America in the Arabian Sea. She reentered the Mediterranean on the 19th and reached Haifa, Israel, two days later. Heading eastward on the 24th, she stopped at Palermo, Sicily, from 27 July to 8 August and then operated with carriers Nimitz and Forrestal until 19 August. On the last two days of those operations, she took part in a missile exercise in the Gulf of Sidra, in international waters off the coast of Libya. After arriving at Rota on 22 August, Ainsworth took part in Exercises "Ocean Venture" and "Magic Sword" before sailing for home on 4 September with the battle group built around Forrestal and reached Norfolk on 15 September.

Following a month in leave and upkeep status at Norfolk, the ship moved to the York River on 15 October to take part in ceremonies celebrating the bicentennial of the American victory at Yorktown. On 20 October, she headed for the Bahamas to serve as a schoolship in antisubmarine warfare training for future commanding officers on the AUTEC Range at Andros Island. She returned to Norfolk on 2 November and, three days later, entered the Home Brothers' Shipyard for a selected restricted availability. This work was completed on 4 January 1982; and, but for short operations in the Caribbean during the latter half of February and the first half of October, the frigate spent most of the year in the vicinity of Norfolk.

She again weighed anchor on 27 December 1982 shortly after departure from Norfolk the ship is believed to have struck a whale and blew out her sonar dome. She proceeded to Brooklyn Naval Shipyard where an emergency replacement of the dome took place taking approximately thirty days and proceeded eastward across the Atlantic, via Bermuda and the Azores, to Rota where she arrived on 7 January 1983. The next day, she pushed on toward the Levant to serve as a naval gunfire support ship backing the multi-national, peace-keeping force at Beirut, Lebanon. She served off that troubled land from 13 to 29 January and then proceeded via the Suez Canal, the Red Sea, and the Gulf of Aden for the Arabian Sea. Following a tender availability at Masirah, Oman, she got underway with carrier America's battle group for "Weapons-Week" operations in the vicinity of Diego Garcia, the American naval base in the Indian Ocean. Following these exercises, she arrived at Male, Maldive Islands, on 7 March for a port visit. Underway again on 13 March, she worked her way back with America's battle group to Masirah which she reached on 26 March. Two days later, she sailed for Kenya and put into Mombasa on 5 April. On ll April, the ship headed back toward the northern Arabian Sea in company with America and, en route, participated in Exercise "PASSEX" which included Australian warships. She also took part in submarine exercises with the submarine Boston. The ship transited the Suez Canal on 30 April and conducted special operations in the central Mediterranean with Nimitz's battle group before she was detached from the 6th Fleet on 10 May to return home. She pulled into Norfolk on the 20th and began a post deployment leave and upkeep period.

Her ensuing operations along the east coast took her to New England waters before she departed Hampton Roads on 10 August for an overhaul at the Charleston Naval Shipyard. The yard work, which included upgrading of the ship's sonar equipment and installation of a close-in weapon system lasted into the spring of 1984. Ainsworth sailed for Norfolk on 28 March and reentered her home port the next day. But for a run to the Bahamas during the second week of July for acoustic trials on the AUTEC range, the ship operated on the east coast for the remainder of the year and well into 1985. Late in March 1985, she traveled south to Florida and thence to the West Indies where she conducted shore bombardment practice at Vieques Island.

Returning north to Norfolk in mid-April, Ainsworth operated in the immediate vicinity until late summer. On 27 August, the frigate stood out of her home port bound for a tour of duty with the 6th Fleet in the Mediterranean Sea. For the next seven months, the warship escorted the carriers of the 6th Fleet as they traveled the length and breadth of the Mediterranean. She participated in a number of exercises testing the fleet's readiness and its ability to operate with elements of allied navies. When not so engaged, the frigate called at a variety of ports on goodwill missions. She completed turnover formalities at Rota, Spain, early in April 1986 and then set out across the Atlantic on 6 April. Ainsworth stood into Norfolk again on 16 April.

Following the usual month of post-deployment leave and upkeep, the warship entered the yard at the Norfolk Shipbuilding & Drydock Co. to begin a 12-week repair period. Emerging from the yard again on 12 August, she operated in the immediate vicinity of Norfolk—either in the lower Chesapeake Bay or just off the Virginia Capes—until early in October. On 4 October, Ainsworth headed south to the coast of Florida where she occupied the rest of the month carrying out refresher training. The frigate returned to Norfolk on 31 October and spent the remainder of 1986 in port.

On 30 September 1990, Ainsworth was assigned to the Atlantic Reserve Fleet and was reclassified as a training frigate (FFT-1090); one of only eight ships of her class subject to this redesignation. On 27 May 1994, she was decommissioned and leased to Turkey where she was renamed as TCG Ege (F-256). Ainsworth was stricken from the U.S. Naval Vessel Register on 11 January 1995.

=== TCG Ege (F 256) ===
The frigate served in the Turkish Navy and was involved in many NATO operations in the Eastern Mediterranean Sea during 1990s. She joined the STANAVFORMED task force in the Adriatic Sea as a warship for search & patrol missions on 13 August 1995 for three months. She also participated in Dynamic Mix International Naval Exercise in 1998. The ship was decommissioned on 21 March 2005; she is currently preserved as a museum ship at İnciraltı Sea Museum, in İzmir, Turkey.
