= USS Fletcher (DD-445) =

Fletcher-class destroyer of the United States Navy

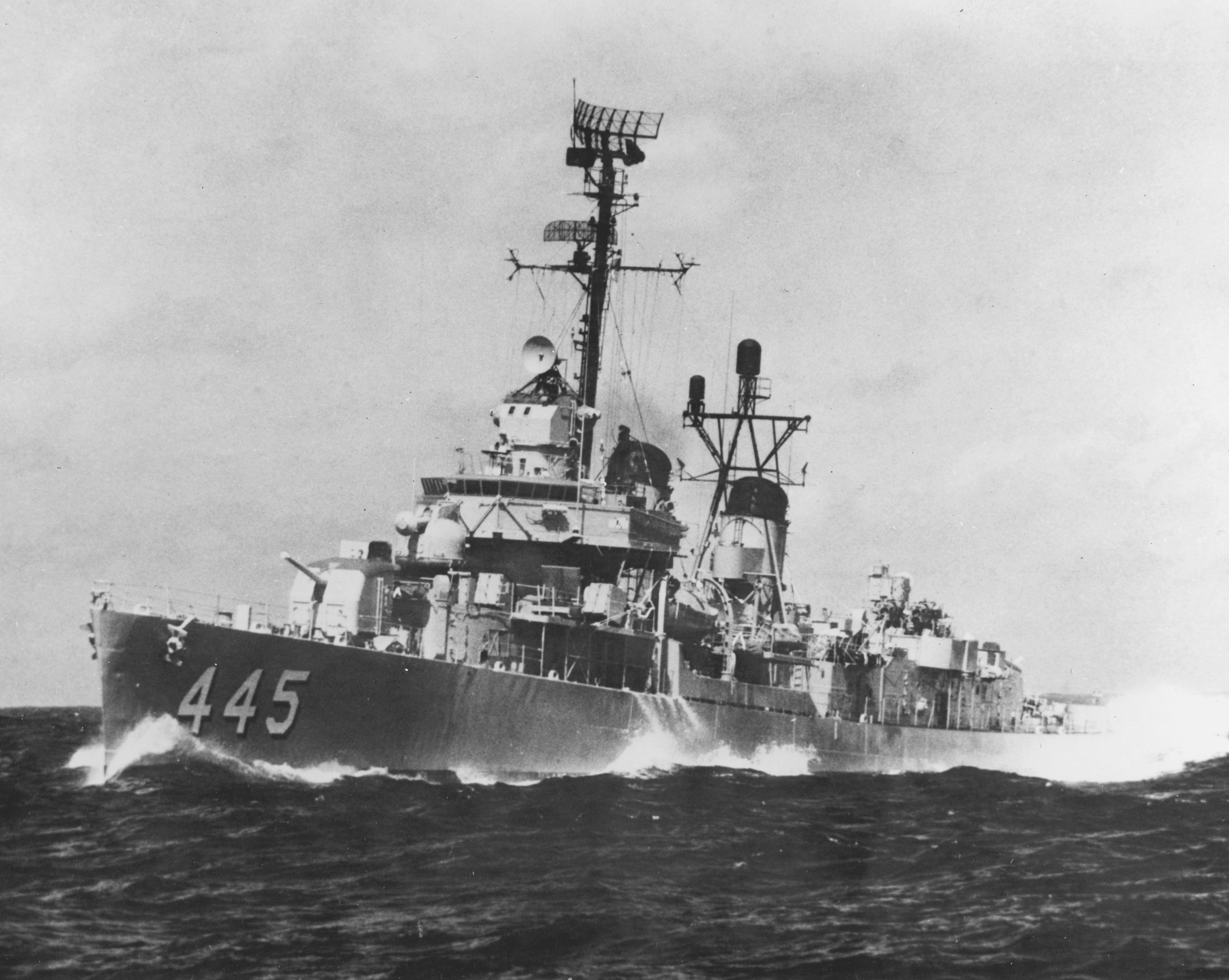
- Fletcher underway in the 1960s

History

United States
- Name: Fletcher
- Namesake: Admiral Frank F. Fletcher
- Builder: Federal Shipbuilding, Kearny, New Jersey
- Laid down: 2 October 1941
- Launched: 3 May 1942
- Commissioned: 30 June 1942
- Decommissioned: 15 January 1947
- Reclassified: DDE-445 on 26 March 1949
- Recommissioned: 3 October 1949
- Decommissioned: 1 October 1969
- Reclassified: DD-445 on 30 June 1962
- Stricken: 1 October 1969
- Identification: Hull symbol:DD-445; Hull symbol:DDE-445; Code letters:NEBG
- Honors and awards: 15 × battle stars WWII; 5 × battle stars Korean War; 7 x battle stars Vietnam War
- Fate: Sold 22 February 1972 and scrapped

General characteristics
- Class & type: Fletcher-class destroyer
- Displacement: 2,100 long tons (2,134 t) (standard); 2,924 long tons (2,971 t) (max)
- Length: 376 ft 5 in (114.73 m) oa
- Beam: 39 ft 08 in (12.09 m)
- Draft: 13 ft 9 in (4.19 m) (max)
- Installed power: 60,000 shp (45,000 kW)
- Propulsion: geared turbines; 2 × screws
- Speed: 36 knots (67 km/h; 41 mph)
- Range: 6,500 nmi (12,000 km) at 15 kn (17 mph; 28 km/h)
- Complement: 273 officers and enlisted
- Armament: 5 × single (127 mm)/38 caliber Dual-purpose guns; 1 × 40 mm (1.6 in) Bofors anti-aircraft guns; 6 × 20 mm (0.79 in) Oerlikon anti-aircraft cannons; 10 × 21-inch (533 mm) torpedo tubes, 6 x K-guns, 2 x depth charge racks

General characteristics
- Armament: 2 × 5 in/38 caliber; 2 x twin 3 in/50 caliber; 1 x Weapon Alpha; 2 x depth charge racks

USS Fletcher (DD/DDE-445), named for Admiral Frank Friday Fletcher, was the lead Fletcher-class destroyer, and served in the Pacific during World War II. She received fifteen battle stars for World War II service, five for Korean War service, and seven for Vietnam War service.

Fletcher was laid down by the Federal Shipbuilding and Dry Dock Company, Kearny, New Jersey, on 2 October 1941. She was launched on 3 May 1942; sponsored by Mrs. F. F. Fletcher, widow of Admiral Fletcher; and commissioned on 30 June 1942.

== Service history ==
=== World War II ===
==== 1942 ====
Fletcher arrived at Nouméa, New Caledonia on 5 October 1942 from the east coast, and at once began escort and patrol duty in the Guadalcanal operation, bombarding Lunga Point on 30 October. Sailing from Espiritu Santo 9 November to cover the landing of reinforcements on the island, she joined in driving off an enemy air attack on the transports 12 November, claiming several enemy aircraft shot down. This was the opening phase of the Naval Battle of Guadalcanal, a 3-day air and surface action. Fletcher played an important part in the surface action off Guadalcanal 13 November, firing guns and torpedoes in the general melee which sank two Japanese destroyers and damaged the fast battleship Hiei, later sunk by carrier and Marine aircraft.

Fletcher retired to replenish at Espiritu Santo, arriving the day after the battle, and after patrolling against submarines off Nouméa, sortied on 30 November 1942, with a force of cruisers and destroyers, to intercept a force of enemy transports and destroyers expected to attempt a reinforcement of Guadalcanal that night. Fletcher led the force through Lengo Channel, and made the first radar contact with the enemy off Tassafaronga Point just before midnight. The resulting Battle of Tassafaronga saw one Japanese destroyer sunk, and one slightly damaged, and four American cruisers badly damaged, though all but one were saved by prompt damage control. Fletcher rescued survivors of Northampton, using cork-floated cargo nets to take great groups of them from the water.

==== 1943 ====
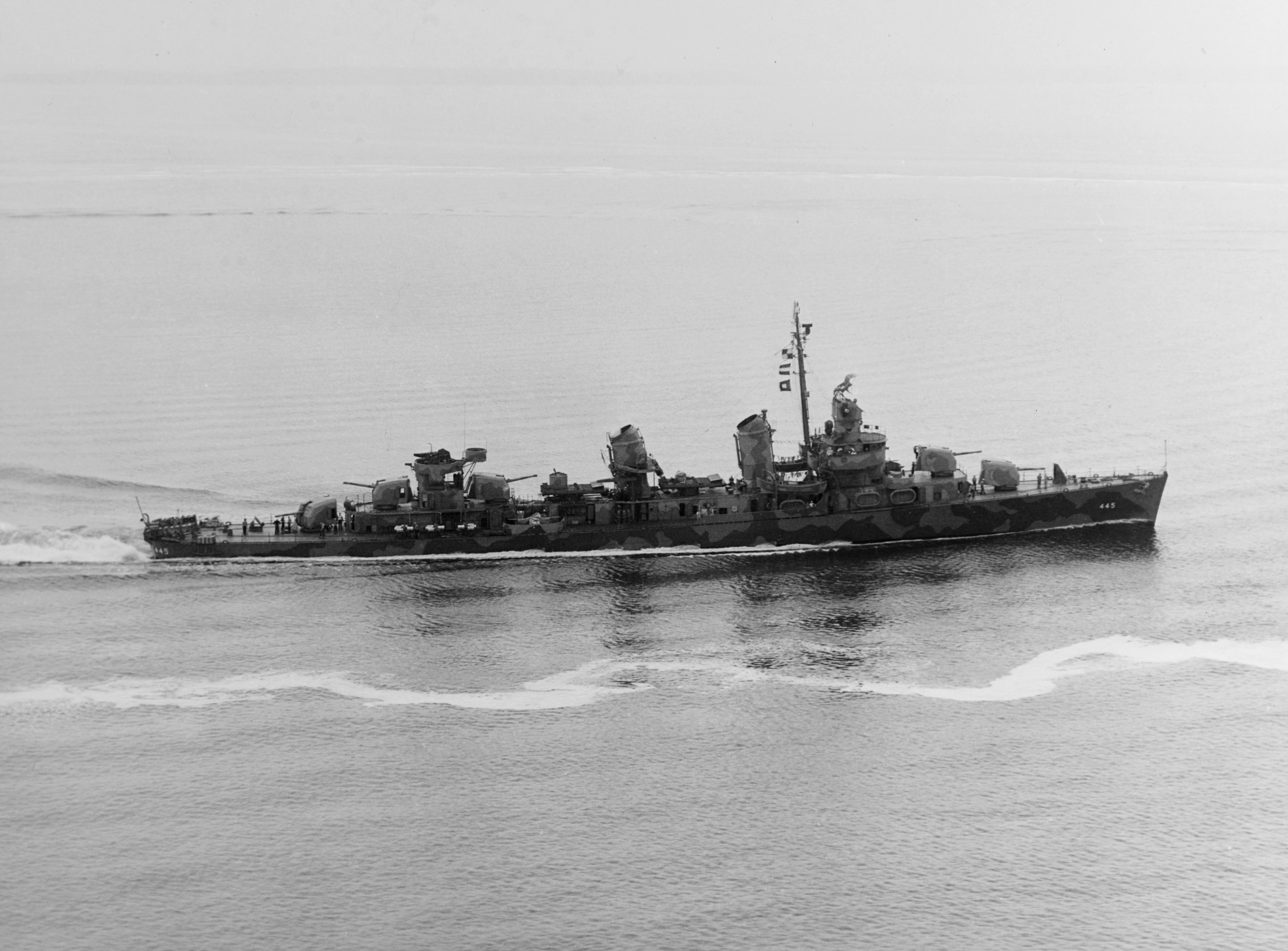
USS Fletcher

The destroyer continued to operate in the Solomon Islands, patrolling, shelling shore targets, driving off Japanese air attacks, rescuing downed aviators, sinking Japanese landing barges, and covering new landings on the northern coast of Guadalcanal. Out on patrol on 11 February 1943, Fletcher was alerted by a smoke float dropped by a plane from Helena, and sped to attack and sink I-18. She supported the landings on the Russell Islands on 21 February, bombarded Munda airfield on New Georgia during the night of 5/6 March, and then continued to guard the movement of transports in the Solomons.

From 23 April to 4 May 1943, Fletcher was in Sydney, Australia, for a refit before another month of general duty in the Solomons. She left Espiritu Santo on 19 June for a Stateside overhaul, returning to Nouméa on 27 September to resume her former activities until 31 October. Then she sortied with an aircraft carrier task force to provide air support for the invasion of the Gilbert Islands, fighting off a Japanese counterattack from the air 26 November. Again, Fletcher fired on Japanese aircraft on 4 December, when the task force came under an air attack after it had made a strike on Kwajalein island.

==== 1944 ====
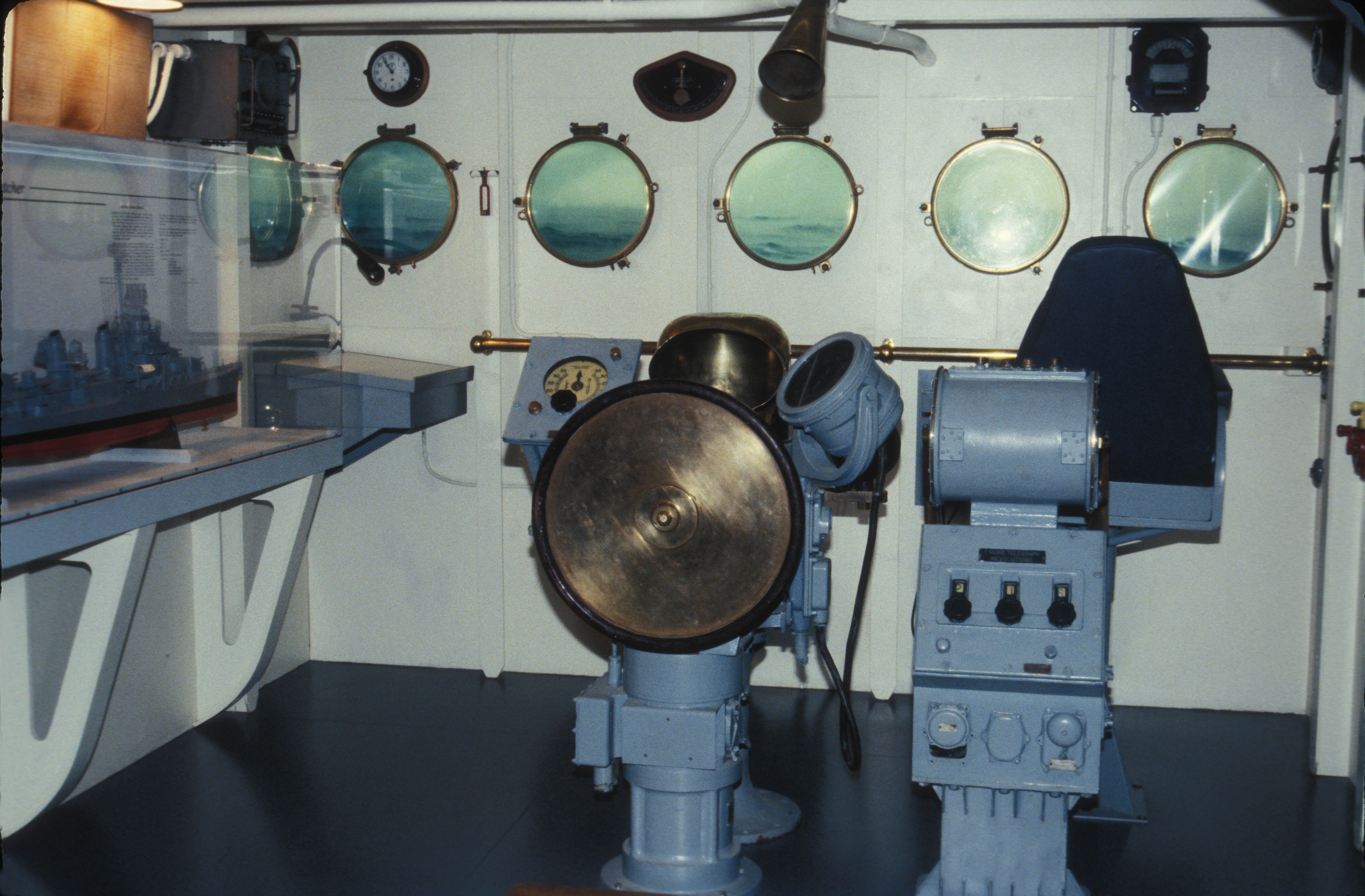
The bridge of Fletcher at the U.S. Navy Museum

Fletcher returned to Pearl Harbor on 9 December 1943, and after a brief overhaul and training on the west coast, was ready for the attack on the Marshall Islands. She screened a force of troop transports from San Diego to Lahaina Roads from 13 to 21 January 1944, then joined a bombardment group to fire on Wotje Atoll 30 January. The next day, she rendezvoused with the main attack force for the landings on Kwajalein, screening the transports and patrolling off the atoll until 4 February. After escorting empty transports to Funafuti, Fletcher reported at Majuro 15 February for duty screening battleships in bombardments of Taroa and Wotje on 20 February and 21 February, then patrolled off Eniwetok.

After joining in training exercises off Port Purvis on Florida Island, in the Solomons, Fletcher arrived at Cape Sudest, New Guinea, 18 April 1944. This was her base during the next month as she supported the Humboldt Bay landings, and by covering reinforcement landings on 30 April. After escorting a convoy to Nouméa, out of which she patrolled against submarines in late May, Fletcher arrived at Humboldt Bay on 5 June. She made one patrol against any attempt of the Japanese to reinforce their Biak garrison, then covered and provided shore bombardment for the invasions of Noemfoor, Sansapor, and Morotai, as well as patrolling and escorting reinforcements for these various operations through the summer.

Fletcher reached Manus on 9 October 1944 from Humboldt Bay to prepare for the invasion of Leyte, for which she sortied 12 October screening transports. She covered them while they sent their boats ashore in the initial landings 20 October, and next day departed for New Guinea, thus clearing Leyte Gulf before the great battle for its control broke out. She returned to Leyte with transports carrying reinforcements 23 November, and through the next month, continued her support of the first phase of the liberation of the Philippines, escorting convoys, firing prelanding bombardments at Ormoc Bay and Mindoro, and firing on Japanese aircraft in several attacks.

==== 1945 ====
On 4 January 1945, Fletcher sortied from San Pedro Bay to provide close cover for the Luzon Attack Force as it sailed toward its objective. She splashed at least one of the many Japanese aircraft which attacked on 8 January, and during the landings in Lingayen Gulf the next day, patrolled the Gulf. After supporting the landings on San Antonio Beach, Luzon, on 29 January, she entered Subic Bay to cover minesweeping, then on 31 January provided fire support to the landings in Nasugbu Bay. Fletcher began four days of operations in the occupation of Bataan and Corregidor on 13 February, firing a preliminary bombardment, giving fire support on call, and covering minesweepers opening Manila Bay. On 14 February, while firing on Japanese batteries at Los Cochinos Point, Fletcher took a hit which killed eight and wounded three of her crew. She continued to fire as she controlled damage, and a half-hour later added rescue operations to her activities as she took the survivors off YMS-48, also hit by Japanese fire. Water Tender Second Class Elmer C. Bigelow was posthumously awarded the Medal of Honor for his "conspicuous gallantry and intrepidity" while fighting the fire on board the destroyer. Fletcher's firing in Manila Bay continued until the 17th.

Fletcher took part in the landings at Puerto Princesa, Palawan, and Zamboanga, covered minesweeping and landings at Tarakan, and gave local patrol and escort service in the Philippines until 13 May 1945, when she sailed for a West Coast overhaul. After exercises off San Diego and in Hawaii, she was docked at San Diego until placed in commission in reserve 7 August 1946, and out of commission in reserve 15 January 1947.

=== 1949–1969 ===
Recommissioned 3 October 1949 as a specialist in antisubmarine warfare (ASW) after conversion to an escort destroyer (DDE-445), Fletcher sailed for San Diego 1 May 1950 for a tour of duty with the 7th Fleet in the western Pacific. At the outbreak of the Korean War, she lay at Hong Kong with Valley Forge, and on 3 July arrived off Korea with the Valley Forge group, augmented by Triumph, to begin launching airstrikes on North Korea. Through the summer, she sailed off Korea on this duty, replenishing when necessary at Buckner Bay, Okinawa, or Sasebo, Japan. She also participated in the Battle of Inchon from 13 to 17 September, and returned to Pearl Harbor, her home port, on 11 November.

On 19 November 1951, Fletcher cleared Pearl Harbor for another tour of duty screening the carriers of the 7th Fleet in Korean operations. She also fired shore bombardment on two occasions, participated in antisubmarine training off Okinawa, and patrolled in the Taiwan Straits. Returning to Pearl Harbor on 20 June 1952, she was at sea again from 5 September to 24 November for Operation Ivy, then completed another tour of Far Eastern duty from 14 May to 30 November 1953.

Annually from 1954 to 1962, Fletcher sailed to the Far East for duty with the 7th Fleet, in 1955 providing antisubmarine screening for the evacuation of the Tachen Islands. In both 1957 and 1958, she made her outward bound passage by way of Samoa and Australia. Intensive antisubmarine training was her major occupation during periods between deployment.

Fletcher was decommissioned and stricken from the Naval Vessel Register on 1 August 1969, and sold for scrap on 22 February 1972.

== Awards ==
Fletcher received fifteen battle stars for World War II service, making her one of the most decorated US Naval vessels of World War II, five for her Korean War service, and seven for her Vietnam War service.

- Asiatic-Pacific Campaign Medal with fifteen battle stars
- World War II Victory Medal
- China Service Medal
- National Defense Service Medal with star
- Korean Service Medal with five battle stars
- Armed Forces Expeditionary Medal with star
- Vietnam Service Medal with seven battle stars
- Philippine Presidential Unit Citation
- Korean Presidential Unit Citation
- Philippine Liberation Medal with two stars
- United Nations Service Medal
- Korean War Service Medal

== On film ==
Fletcher appears in the 1960 comedy film The Wackiest Ship in the Army, starring Jack Lemmon (appears in the harbor when the USS Echo is first visited), and also in the film Down Periscope in stock footage as the ship that is targeted and sunk to end the film's war games.
