= Hebron Township, Illinois =

Coordinates: 42°26′56″N 88°25′21″W

Hebron Township
- Township
- Location in McHenry County
- Country: United States
- State: Illinois
- County: McHenry
- Established: November 6, 1849

Area
  - Total: 32.97 sq mi (85.4 km^{2})
  - Land: 32.97 sq mi (85.4 km^{2})
  - Water: 0 sq mi (0 km^{2}) 0%

Population (2010)
  - Estimate (2016): 2,296
  - Density: 71.5/sq mi (27.6/km^{2})
- Time zone: UTC-6 (CST)
  - Summer (DST): UTC-5 (CDT)
- FIPS code: 17-111-33864
- Website: www.hebrontownship.org

Hebron Township is located in McHenry County, Illinois. As of the 2010 census, its population was 2,356 and it contained 967 housing units.

== Geography ==
According to the 2010 census, the township has a total area of 32.97 square miles (85.4 km^{2}), all land.

== Demographics ==
Historical population
Census	Pop.	Note	%±
2016 (est.)	2,296
U.S. Decennial Census
