= USS Stark incident =

1987 Iraqi attack during the Iran–Iraq War

- Part of the Iran–Iraq War's tanker war
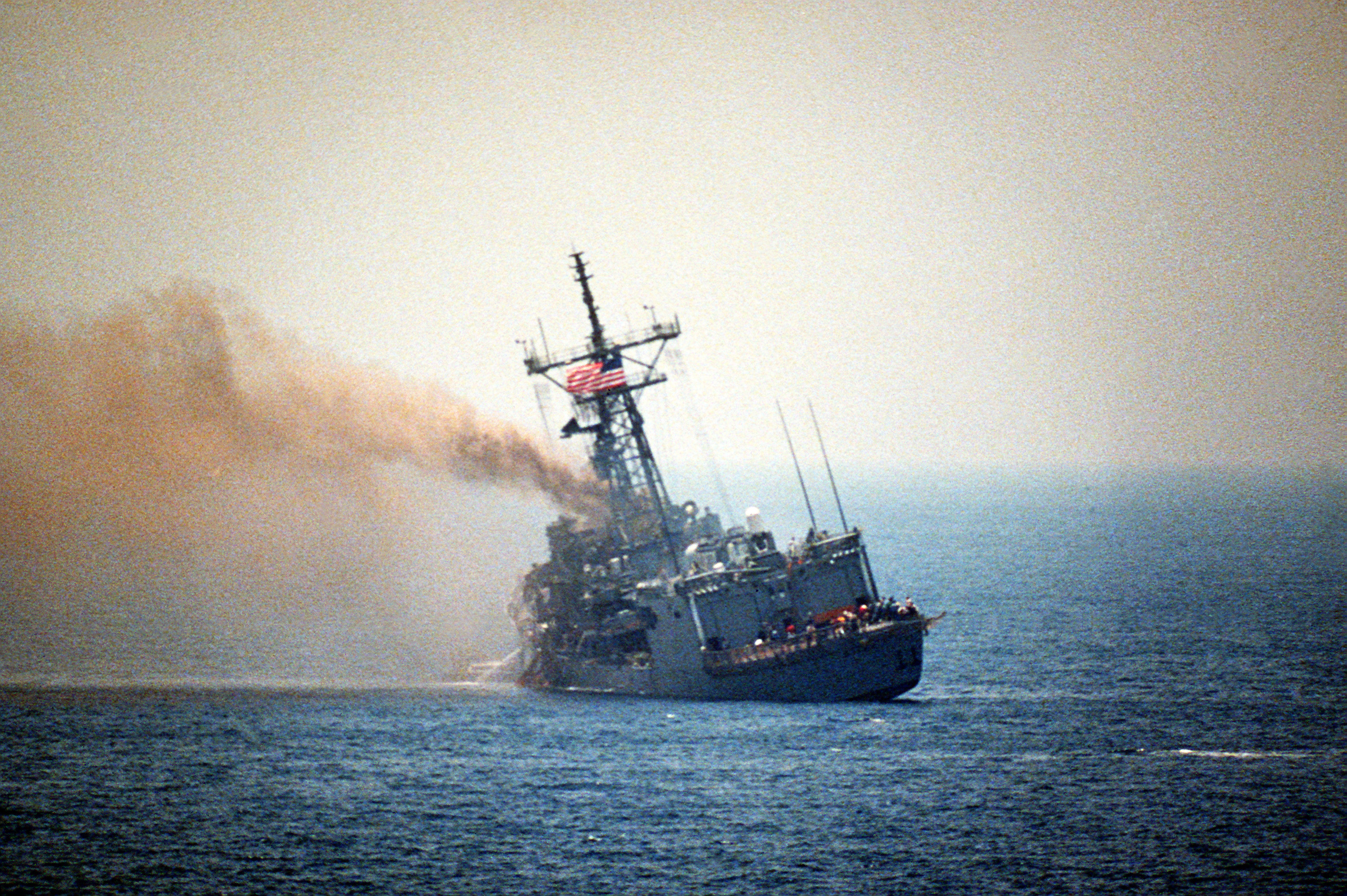
- USS Stark listing after being struck by two Iraqi Exocet missiles in the Persian Gulf
Date	17 May 1987
Location	Persian Gulf 26°47′N 51°55′E
Result	Iraqi victory: U.S. frigate severely damaged by Iraqi aircraft

Belligerents
United States	Iraq

Commanders and leaders
Glenn R. Brindel	Abdul Rahman

Units involved
USS Stark	Iraqi Air Force

Strength
Sea: 1 frigate Air: 1 aircraft	1 aircraft

Casualties and losses
37 killed 21 wounded 1 frigate damaged	None

The USS Stark incident occurred during the Iran–Iraq War in the Persian Gulf on 17 May 1987, when an Iraqi jet aircraft fired two Exocet missiles at the U.S. frigate USS Stark. A total of 37 United States Navy personnel were killed or later died as a result of the attack, and 21 were injured. Iraq apologized, and Saddam Hussein said that the pilot mistook the frigate for an Iranian tanker.

== Incident ==
The USS Stark was part of the Middle East Task Force assigned to patrol off the Saudi Arabian coast near the Iran–Iraq War exclusion boundary.

The United States Central Command identified the attacking aircraft as an Iraqi Dassault Mirage F1 fighter, but the F1EQ-5 variant of the Mirage F1 operated by Iraq was capable of carrying only one Exocet. Later reports asserted that the attacking aircraft was a Falcon 50 business jet which had been modified with a radar and missile hardpoints to carry two AM-39 Exocet missiles for anti-shipping operations. Iraq had used modified Falcon jets in civilian markings to conduct covert photographic reconnaissance in the Persian Gulf to avoid attracting suspicion.

Initially not alarmed, at 22:09 Stark Captain Glenn R. Brindel ordered a radioman to send the message: "Unknown aircraft, this is U.S. Navy warship on your 078 (degrees) for twelve miles. Request you identify yourself". The pilot did not respond to the message. The ship's captain ordered a second message sent, to which there was no reply. At 22:10 Brindel was informed the aircraft had targeted the ship, locking his Cyrano-IV fire-control radar onto the Stark. The aircraft fired the first Exocet missile 22 mi (35 km) from the ship, and the second from 15 mi (24 km), after which the pilot banked left and began to withdraw.

Stark's ESM system detected an incoming missile for ten seconds one minute before impact, search radar was tracking the aircraft, the SRBOC decoy system was armed but not employed, and the CIWS remained in standby. The ship did not maneuver to unmask batteries, did not use fire control radar to lock-on and warn the aircraft, nor was General Quarters sounded until the first Exocet missile struck the port side of the ship near the bridge. Although it failed to detonate, rocket fuel ignited and caused a large fire that quickly spread throughout the ship's post office, storeroom and the combat operations center (where the ship's weapons are controlled).

The second Exocet also struck the port side, 30 seconds later. This missile detonated, leaving a 10 by 15 ft (3.0 by 4.6 m) hole in the frigate's left side. Electronics for Stark's Standard Missile defense went out and Brindel could not order his men to return fire. An AWACS plane was still in the area and just after witnessing the attack, radioed a nearby Saudi Arabian airbase to send aircraft for an interception but the ground controllers did not have the authority to order a sortie and the jet left unchallenged. The US Navy's rules of engagement allowed Stark to defend herself after sufficiently warning the hostile aircraft.

Brindel ordered the starboard side flooded to keep the hole on the hull's port side above water. This helped prevent the Stark from sinking. Brindel quickly dispatched a distress call after the first missile hit. It was received by USS Waddell, which was in the area and USS Conyngham with two-thirds of its crew on liberty in Bahrain. Waddell and Conyngham arrived to provide damage control and relief to the Stark's crew. According to the Pentagon, an Iranian helicopter joined a Saudi Arabian vessel to aid in rescue operations.

A total of 37 crew were killed in the attack, 29 from the initial explosion and fire, including two lost at sea. Eight later died from their injuries. Twenty-one others survived their wounds.

== Aftermath ==
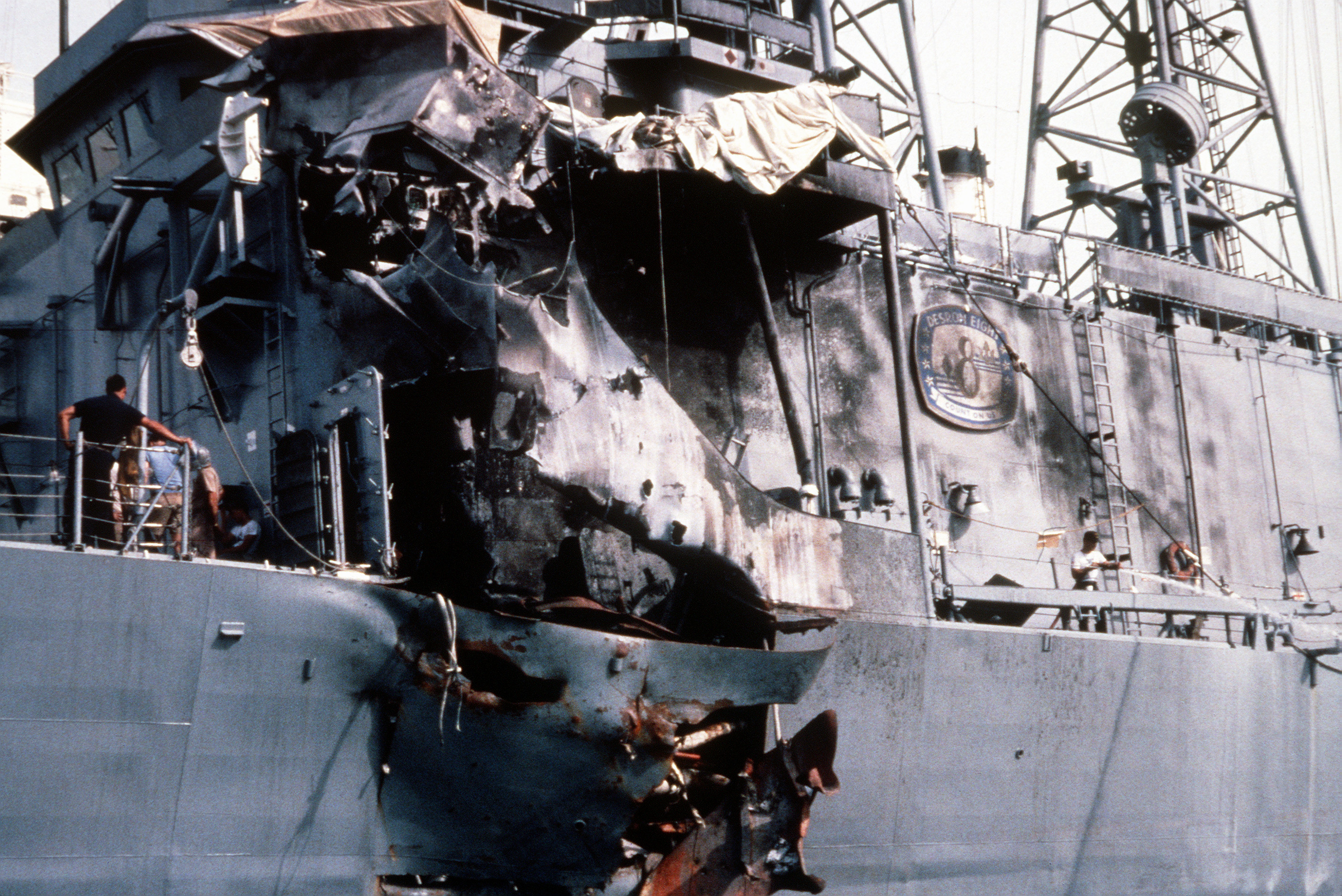
Damage to USS Stark's hull and superstructure in the Persian Gulf

Stark arrived at Bahrain the following day, 18 May 1987. There she was temporarily repaired by the destroyer tender USS Acadia before setting a course for Mayport Naval Station, Florida, the ship's home port. A court of inquiry under Rear Admiral Grant Sharp was formed to investigate the incident and later Captain Brindel was recommended for court-martial but was ultimately only reprimanded and relieved of duty. The flag officer in charge of the operation, Rear Admiral Harold Bernsen, was found blameless and continued in his post. It was found that Stark was 2 miles (3.2 km) outside the exclusion zone and had not violated neutrality as the Iraqis claimed. Iraq apologized, and Saddam Hussein said that the pilot mistook Stark for an Iranian tanker.

=== Reactions and statements ===
U.S. officials claimed that the Iraqi jet's pilot was not acting under orders from his government and that he was later executed, but an Iraqi Air Force officer later stated that the pilot was not punished and was still alive.

According to Jean-Louis Bernard, author of Heroes of Bagdad T1 (Editions JPO 2017), the pilot, Abdul Rahman, would have received the medal of bravery at the end of a joint Iraqi-U.S. commission of inquiry. His subsequent defection to Iran is not mentioned in this book. Jean-Louis Bernard also confirms the use of a Falcon 50 during this action.

Iranian Prime Minister Mir Hossein Mousavi called it a "divine blessing" and reiterated the standard Iranian view that the Persian Gulf "is not a safe place for the superpowers and it is in their interest not to enter this quicksand". A spokesman for the Iraqi Foreign Ministry said Iraq would never intentionally attack any target in the Gulf unless it was Iranian, and laid the blame on Iran.

Washington used the incident to pressure Iran, which it later inaccurately blamed for the whole situation. US President Ronald Reagan said "We've never considered them [Iraq's military] hostile at all", and "the villain in the piece is Iran".

The Joint Chiefs of Staff investigation into the incident recommended that Iraq be held accountable, a finding the government of Iraq eventually complied with. Captain Brindel was relieved of duty and retired as a commander for not defending his ship, whilst tactical action officer Lieutenant Basil E. Moncrief resigned.

=== Claims ===
The office of the Legal Adviser to the United States State Department, led by Abraham Sofaer, submitted their first claim to Ambassador Abdul-Amir Ali al-Anbari on April 4, 1988, for the crewmen who were killed. Sofaer subsequently led a delegation to Baghdad to engage in further negotiations with the Iraqis, ultimately closing a deal where Iraq agreed to pay over $27 million, roughly 92% of the U.S.' original filings. Senator John Warner thanked Sofaer for his work on this issue on the Senate floor on May 1, 1989.

A second claim for the wounded crewmen was not resolved for another two decades. On 21 June 2011, an agreement was reached between the governments of the United States and Iraq regarding claims of United States citizens against the regime of Saddam Hussein. The Iraqi government established a fund of $400 million to compensate prisoners of war and hostages in the Persian Gulf War, and those killed or injured in the 1987 attack on Stark. The United States Department of State was to establish a mechanism to process applications for compensation.

== Memorials ==
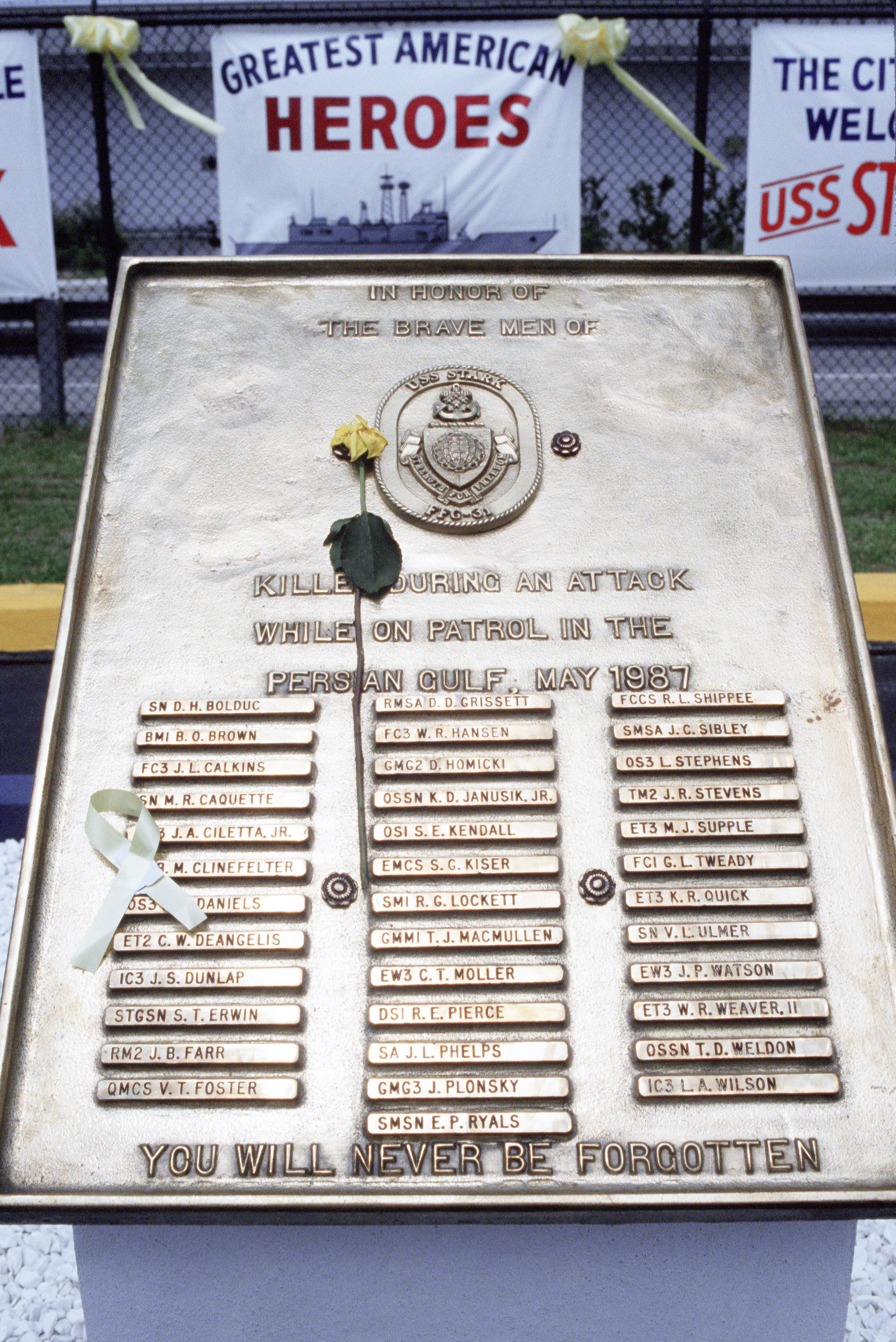
The memorial plaque for the killed U.S. sailors at Mayport, Florida

On 22 May 1987, a eulogy was given by US President Ronald Reagan at Mayport Naval Station, Jacksonville, Florida.

A ceremony is held at Mayport Naval Station on 17 May each year to remember the 37 men who died in the incident.

== In popular culture ==
On the American television series JAG, U.S. Navy Chief Petty Officer Kyle Anderson is portrayed as being a survivor of the attack on the Stark. In season 4 JAG episode "Jaggle Bells," it was also noted how the attack on the Stark was in fact actually carried out by the "Iraqi Air Force."

== See also ==
- USS Vincennes incident
- USS Panay incident
- USS Liberty incident
- USS Pueblo incident
- Gulf of Tonkin incident
- Battle of Đồng Hới

== Sources ==
- Levinson, Jeffrey L.; Randy L. Edwards (1997). Missile Inbound. Annapolis, Md.: Naval Institute Press. ISBN 1-55750-517-9.
