= USS Stark =

Oliver Hazard Perry class frigate

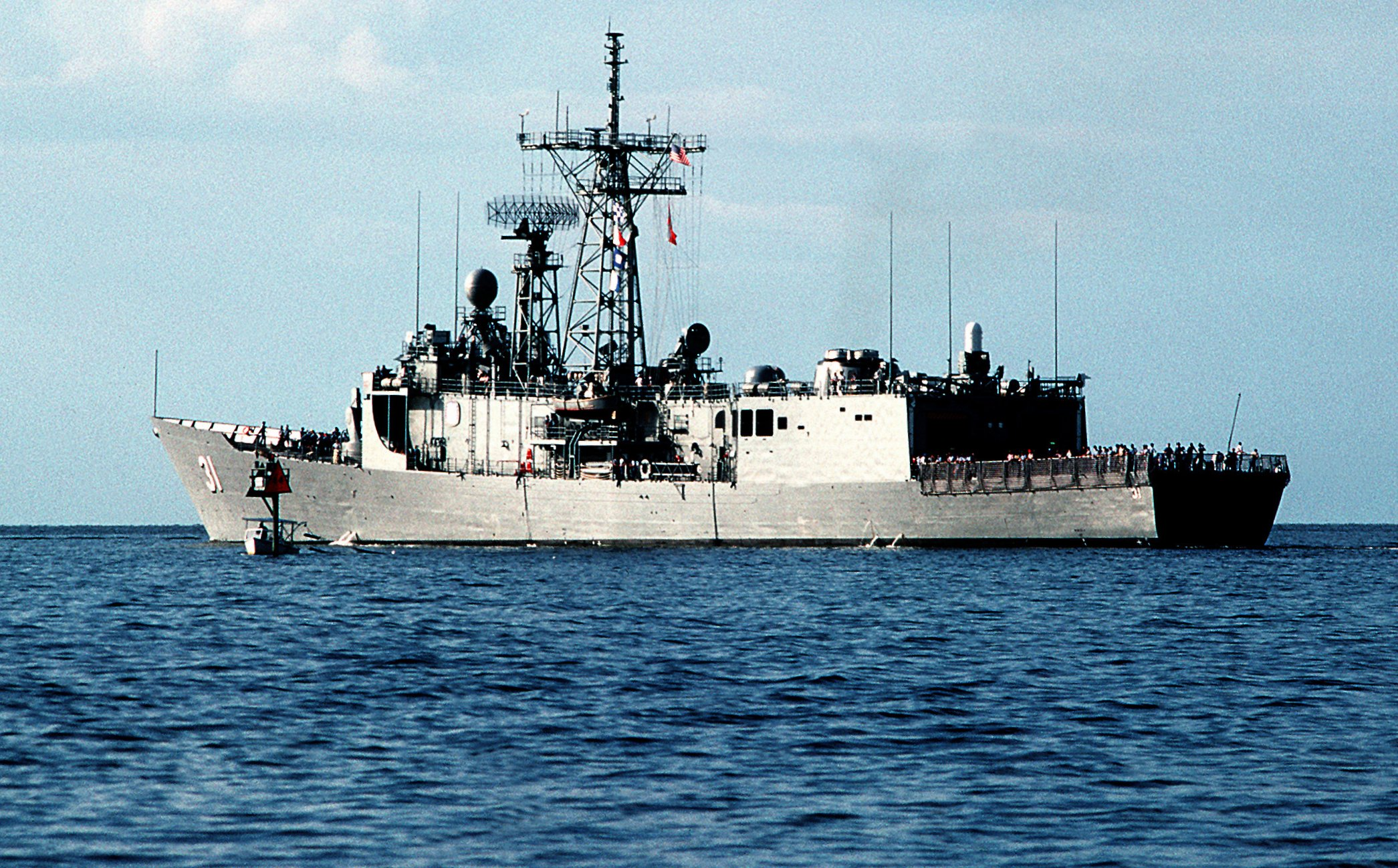
- USS Stark (FFG-31)

History

United States
- Name: Stark
- Namesake: Admiral Harold Raynsford Stark
- Awarded: 23 January 1978
- Builder: Todd Pacific Shipyards, Seattle, Washington
- Laid down: 24 August 1979
- Launched: 30 May 1980
- Commissioned: 23 October 1982
- Decommissioned: 7 May 1999
- Stricken: 7 May 1999
- Home port: Naval Station Mayport (former)
- Identification: Hull symbol: FFG-31; Code letters: NHPA
- Motto: Strength for Freedom
- Fate: Scrapped 2006
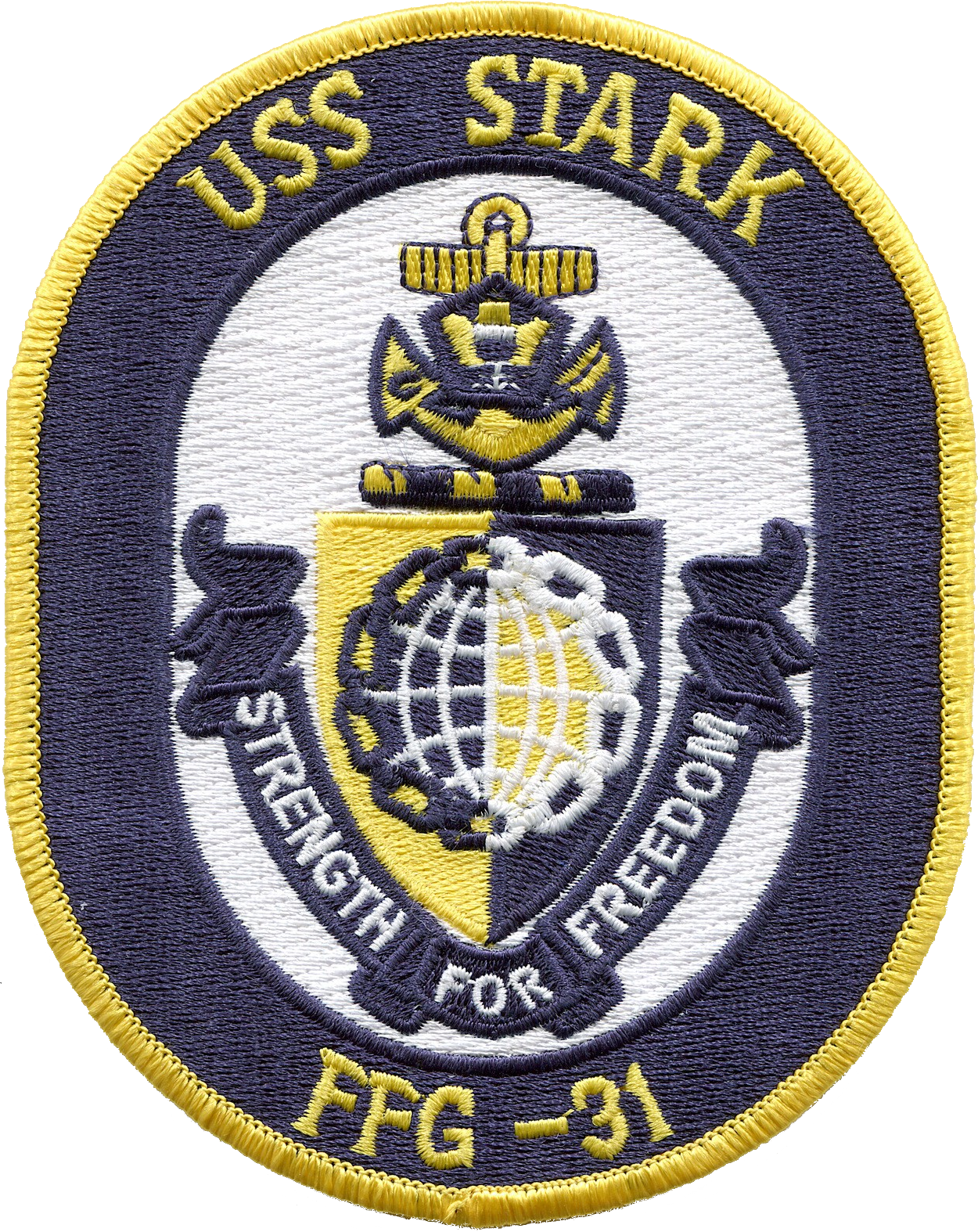
- Badge

General characteristics
- Class & type: Oliver Hazard Perry-class frigate
- Displacement: 4,100 long tons (4,200 t), full load
- Length: 445 feet (136 m), overall
- Beam: 45 feet (14 m)
- Draft: 22 feet (6.7 m)
- Propulsion: 2 × General Electric LM2500-30 gas turbines generating 41,000 shp (31 MW) through a single shaft and variable pitch propeller; 2 × Auxiliary Propulsion Units, 350 hp (260 kW) retractable electric azimuth thrusters for maneuvering and docking.
- Speed: over 29 knots (54 km/h)
- Range: 5,000 nautical miles at 18 knots (9,300 km at 33 km/h)
- Complement: 15 officers and 190 enlisted, plus SH-60 LAMPS detachment of roughly six officer pilots and 15 enlisted maintainers
- Sensors & processing systems: AN/SPS-49 air-search radar; AN/SPS-55 surface-search radar; CAS and STIR fire-control radar; AN/SQS-56 sonar.
- Electronic warfare & decoys: AN/SLQ-32
- Armament: As built: 1 × OTO Melara Mk 75 76 mm/62 caliber naval gun; 2 × Mk 32 triple-tube (324 mm) launchers for Mark 46 torpedoes; 1 × Vulcan Phalanx CIWS; 4 × .50-cal (12.7 mm) machine guns.; 1 × Mk 13 Mod 4 single-arm launcher for Harpoon anti-ship missiles and SM-1MR Standard anti-ship/air missiles (40 round magazine); Note: As of 2004, Mk 13 systems removed from all active US vessels of this class.
- Aircraft carried: 1 × SH-2F LAMPS I
- Notes: Short deck variant, no towed array

USS Stark (FFG-31) was the 23rd ship of the Oliver Hazard Perry class of guided-missile frigates and was named after Admiral Harold Raynsford Stark (1880–1972). Ordered from Todd Pacific Shipyards in Seattle, Washington, on 23 January 1978, Stark was laid down on 24 August 1979, launched on 30 May 1980, and commissioned on 23 October 1982. In 1987, during the Iran–Iraq War, an Iraqi jet fired two missiles at Stark, killing 37 U.S. sailors on board. Decommissioned on 7 May 1999, Stark was scrapped in 2006.

== Missile attack ==
USS Stark was deployed to the Middle East Force in 1984 and 1987. Captain Glenn R. Brindel was the commanding officer during the 1987 deployment. The ship was struck on 17 May 1987 by two Exocet anti-ship missiles during the Iran–Iraq War fired from an Iraqi aircraft officially identified as a Dassault Mirage F1 fighter, The Reagan administration inaccurately attributed the blame to Iran for its alleged belligerence in the underlying conflict. The plane had taken off from Shaibah, Iraq at 20:00 and had flown south into the Persian Gulf. The pilot fired the first Exocet missile from a range of 22.5 nautical miles (41.7 km), and the second from 15.5 nautical miles (28.7 km), just about the time Stark issued a standard warning by radio. The frigate did not detect the missiles with radar; warning was given by the lookout only moments before the missiles struck. The first penetrated the port-side hull and failed to detonate, but left flaming rocket fuel in its path. The second entered at almost the same point, and, leaving a 3-by-4-meter (10 by 13 ft) gash, exploded in crew quarters. The missiles killed 37 sailors and injured 21.

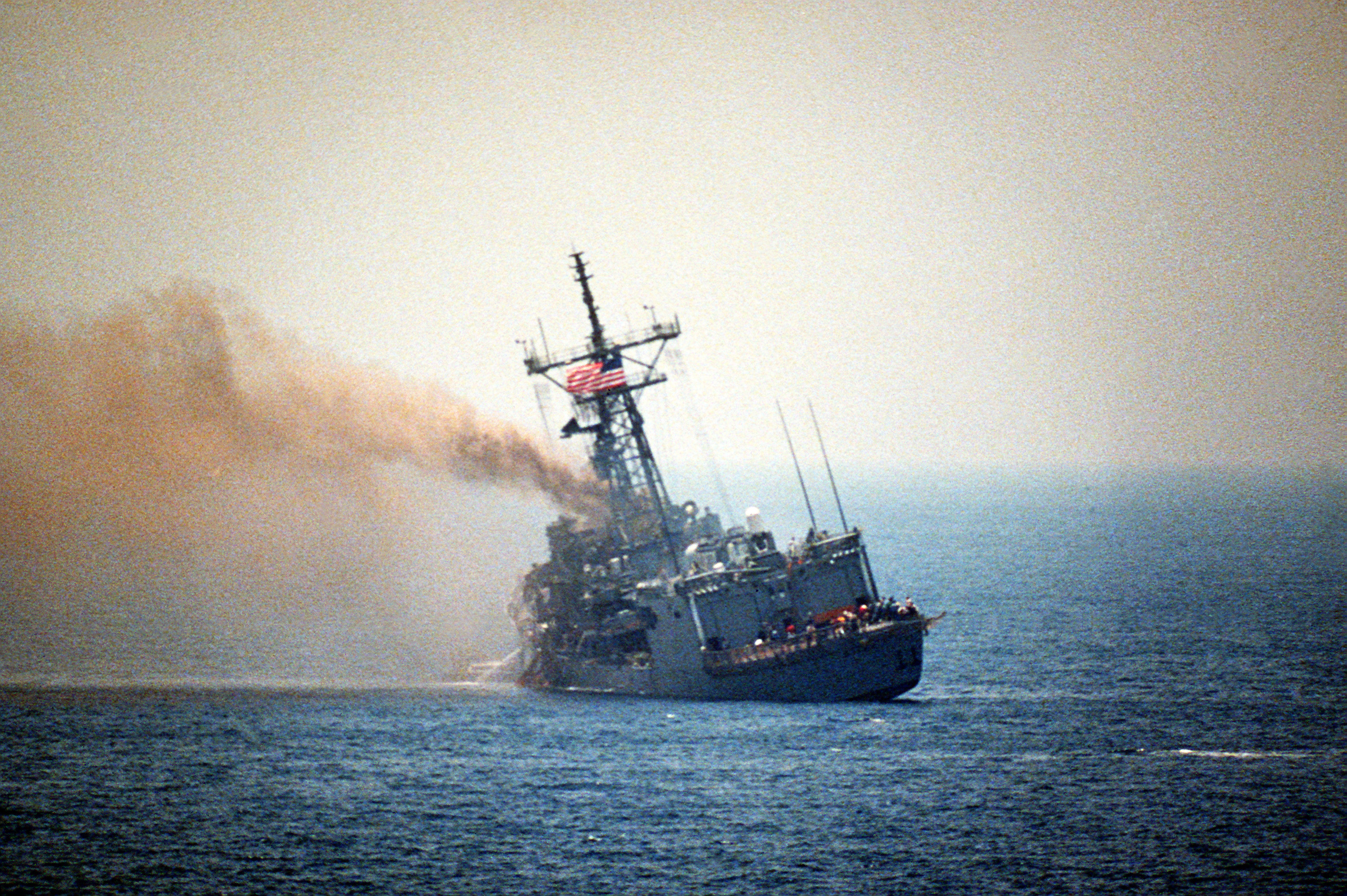
Stark listing following two hits by Exocet missiles.

No weapons were fired in defense of Stark. The autonomous Phalanx CIWS remained in standby mode, Mark 36 SRBOC countermeasures were not armed until seconds before the missile hit. The attacking Exocet missiles and Mirage aircraft were in a blindspot of the STIR fire control director (Separate tracking and illumination Radar, part of the Mk 92 Guided Missile Fire Control System), and the Oto Melara Mk 75 76 mm/62 caliber naval gun, but in the clear for the MK 92 CAS (Combined Antenna System, primary search and tracking radar of the Mk 92 Guided Missile Fire Control System) and the Mk 13 Mod 4 single-arm launcher. The ship failed to maneuver to bring its Mk 75 to bear before the first missile hit.

On fire and listing, the frigate was brought under control by its crew during the night. The ship made its way to Bahrain where, after temporary repairs by the destroyer tender USS Acadia to make her seaworthy, she returned to her home port of Naval Station Mayport, under her own power. The ship was eventually repaired at Ingalls Shipbuilding in Mississippi for $142 million.

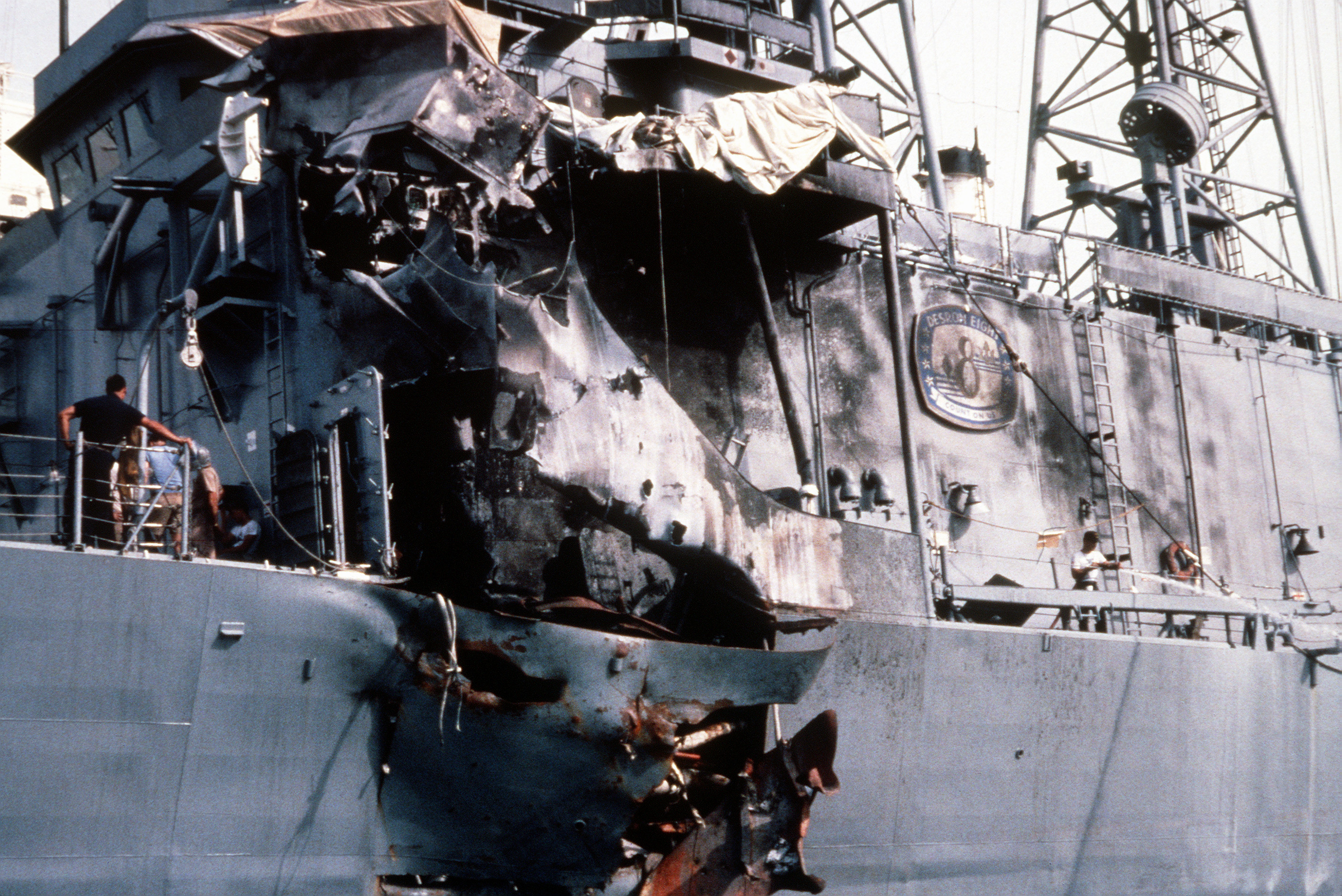
A view of external damage to the port side.

It is unknown whether Iraqi leaders authorized the attack. Initial claims by the Iraqi government that Stark was inside the Iran–Iraq War zone were shown to be false. The motives and orders of the pilot remain unanswered. American officials have claimed he was executed, but an ex-Iraqi Air Force commander later said that the pilot who attacked Stark was not punished, and remained alive. According to Jean-Louis Bernard, author of Heroes of Bagdad, the pilot, Abdul Rhaman, not only was not punished, but received the Medal of Bravery at the end of "a joint Iraqi-American commission of inquiry." His subsequent defection is not mentioned in this book. Jean-Louis Bernard also confirms the use of a Falcon 50 during this action. Citing lapses in training requirements and lax procedures, the U.S. Navy's board of inquiry recommended Captain Brindel be relieved of command, and recommended him for court-martial, along with tactical action officer Lieutenant Basil E. Moncrief. Instead, Brindel and Moncrief received non-judicial punishment from Admiral Frank B. Kelso II and letters of reprimand. Brindel opted for early retirement while Moncrief resigned his commission after only eight years of service. The executive officer, Lieutenant Commander Raymond Gajan Jr., was detached for cause and received a letter of admonition.

== 1990s ==
Stark was part of the Standing Naval Forces Atlantic Fleet in 1990 before returning to the Middle East Force in 1991. Stark was attached to UNITAS in 1993 and took part in Operation Uphold Democracy and Operation Able Vigil in 1994. In 1995, Stark returned to the Middle East Force before serving with the Standing Naval Forces, Atlantic (STANAVFORLANT) in 1997 and in 1998.

Stark was decommissioned on 7 May 1999. A scrapping contract was awarded to Metro Machine Corp. of Philadelphia, Pennsylvania, on 7 October 2005. The ship was reported scrapped on 21 June 2006. Her stern plate was saved and donated to Naval Station Mayport.

== In popular culture ==
On the American television series JAG, U.S. Navy Chief Petty Officer Kyle Anderson is portrayed as being a survivor of the USS Stark incident. In season 4 JAG episode "Jaggle Bells," it was also noted how the attack on the Stark was in fact actually carried out by the "Iraqi Air Force."
