= Akiyama Teruo =

Imperial Japanese Navy officer (1891–1943)

- 秋山 輝男
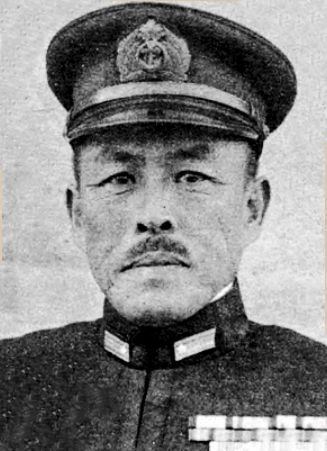
- Born: September 16, 1891; Kumamoto Prefecture, Japan
- Died: July 6, 1943 (aged 51); Solomon Islands
- Military career
- Allegiance: Empire of Japan
- Branch: Imperial Japanese Navy
- Service years: 1913–1943
- Rank: Vice Admiral (posthumous)
- Commands: Fubuki; Yūgure; Tachibana; Kashiwa; Sawarabi; Hamakaze; Murakumo; Naka
- Conflicts: World War II; Battle of Kula Gulf †

Teruo Akiyama (秋山 輝男, Akiyama Teruo; 16 September 1891 – 6 July 1943) was an admiral in the Imperial Japanese Navy during World War II.

== Biography ==
Akiyama was a native of Kumamoto prefecture. He graduated from the 41st class of the Imperial Japanese Naval Academy in 1913, ranked 61st out of 118 cadets. He served as midshipman on the cruisers Asama and Kurama. After he was commissioned as an ensign, he was assigned to the battleship Asahi. He subsequently served on the battleship Suwo, cruiser Izumo and destroyer Yudachi.

Akiyama was promoted to lieutenant on 1 December 1918, and was assigned to the destroyer Isokaze as chief torpedo officer. However, from 1921 to 1922, he also served as executive officer on the submarines SS-35 and SS-45.

On 7 February 1924, he was given his first command: the destroyer Fubuki. He subsequently commanded the destroyers Yūgure, Tachibana, Kashiwa, Sawarabi, Hamakaze and Murakumo in the 10-year period from 1924 to 1934. Promoted to captain on 1 December 1937, he served in mostly staff assignments until the start of the Pacific War, with the exception of a posting as captain of the cruiser Naka in 1939. He was promoted to rear admiral on 1 November 1942.

During the Solomon Islands campaign, on 6 July 1943, Akiyama commanded the 3rd Destroyer Squadron, which consisted of 10 destroyers loaded with 2,600 combat troops, bound for Vila on Kolombangara. At 01:06 off Kolombangara, the task group came into contact with U.S. Navy Task Group 36.1 (TG 36.1), commanded by Rear Admiral Walden L. Ainsworth, and consisting of light cruisers USS Helena, Honolulu, and St. Louis, along with four destroyers. In the resultant Battle of Kula Gulf, the American ships opened fire at 01:57 and quickly sank the Japanese flagship, destroyer Niizuki, killing Admiral Akiyama.

Akiyama was posthumously promoted to vice admiral.

== Notable positions held ==
- Commanding Officer, MS W-1 - 1 December 1925 – 1 December 1926
- Commanding Officer, MS W-1 - 20 January 1928 – 1 November 1928
- Commanding Officer, DD Murakumo - 1 December 1932 – 15 November 1935
- Commanding Officer, DD Usugumo - 1 November 1934 – 15 November 1934
- ComDesDiv 30 – 1 December 1937 – 10 December 1938
- ComDesDiv 4 – 10 December 1938 – 25 October 1939
- ComDesDiv 34 – 25 October 1939 – 15 November 1939
- Commanding Officer, CL Naka - 15 November 1939 – 15 October 1940
- ComDesRon 3 – 23 March 1943 – 6 July 1943 (KIA)

== Dates of promotions ==
- Midshipman - 19 December 1913
- Ensign - 1 December 1914
- Lieutenant (j.g.) - 1 December 1916
- Lieutenant - 1 December 1920
- Lieutenant Commander - 1 December 1926
- Commander - 1 December 1932
- Captain - 1 December 1937
- Rear Admiral - 1 November 1942
- Vice Admiral - 6 July 1943 (posthumous)
