= USS St. Louis (CL-49) =

Brooklyn-class light cruiser

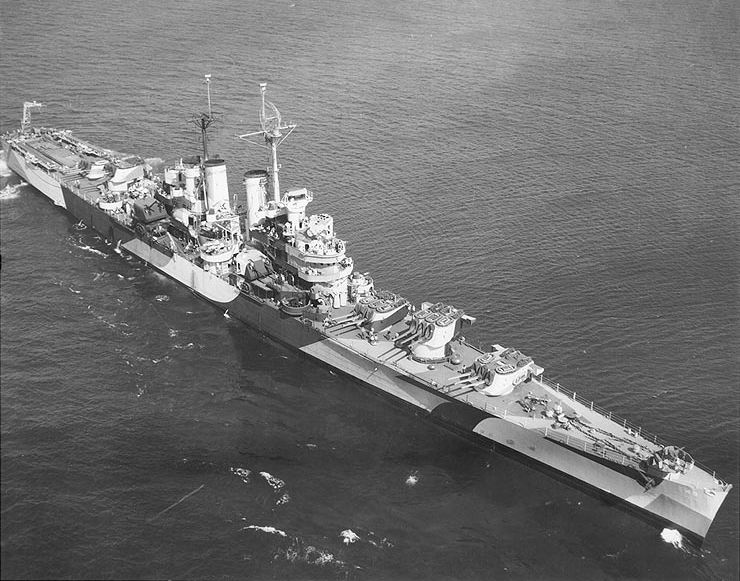
- USS St. Louis (October 1944)

History

United States
- Name: St. Louis
- Namesake: City of St. Louis, Missouri
- Builder: Newport News Shipbuilding and Drydock Company, Newport News, Virginia
- Laid down: 10 December 1936
- Launched: 15 April 1938
- Commissioned: 19 May 1939
- Decommissioned: 20 June 1946
- Stricken: 22 January 1951
- Fate: Sold to Brazil on 29 January 1951

Brazil
- Name: Almirante Tamandaré
- Namesake: Joaquim Marques Lisboa, Marquis of Tamandaré
- Acquired: 22 January 1951
- Commissioned: 29 January 1951
- Decommissioned: 28 June 1976
- Stricken: 1976
- Fate: Sunk while under tow from Rio de Janeiro to the ship-breakers in Taiwan for scrapping, 24 August 1980, 38°48′S 01°24′W

General characteristics (As built)
- Class & type: Brooklyn-class light cruiser
- Displacement: Standard: 10,000 long tons (10,160 t); Full load: 13,327 long tons (13,541 t)
- Length: 608 ft 8 in (185.52 m)
- Beam: 61 ft 5 in (18.72 m)
- Draft: 19 ft 10 in (6.05 m) (mean); 24 ft (7.3 m) (max)
- Installed power: 8 × Steam boilers; 100,000 shp (75,000 kW)
- Propulsion: 4 × geared turbines; 4 × screws
- Speed: 32.5 kn (60.2 km/h; 37.4 mph)
- Complement: 888 officers and enlisted men
- Armament: 15 × 6 in (152 mm)/47 caliber Mark 16 guns; 8 × 5 in (127 mm)/38 caliber anti-aircraft guns; 8 × caliber 0.50 in (12.7 mm) machine guns
- Armor: Belt: 3 1/4–5 in (83–127 mm); Deck: 2 in (51 mm); Barbettes: 6 in (150 mm); Turrets: 1 1/4–6 in (32–152 mm); Conning Tower: 2 1/4–5 in (57–127 mm)
- Aircraft carried: 4 × SOC Seagull floatplanes
- Aviation facilities: 2 × stern catapults

General characteristics (1945)
- Armament: 15 × 6-inch/47 caliber Mark 16 guns (5x3); 4 × twin 5-inch/38 caliber anti-aircraft guns; 4 × quad 40 mm (1.6 in) Bofors anti-aircraft guns; 6 × twin 40 mm Bofors anti-aircraft guns; 18 × 20 mm (0.79 in) Oerlikon anti-aircraft cannons

USS St. Louis, eighth of nine Brooklyn-class light cruisers, was the fifth ship of the United States Navy named after the city of St. Louis, Missouri. Commissioned in 1939, she was very active in the Pacific during World War II, earning eleven battle stars.

She was deactivated shortly after the war, but was recommissioned into the Brazilian Navy as Almirante Tamandaré in 1951. She served until 1976, and sank under tow to the scrappers in 1980.

== Design ==
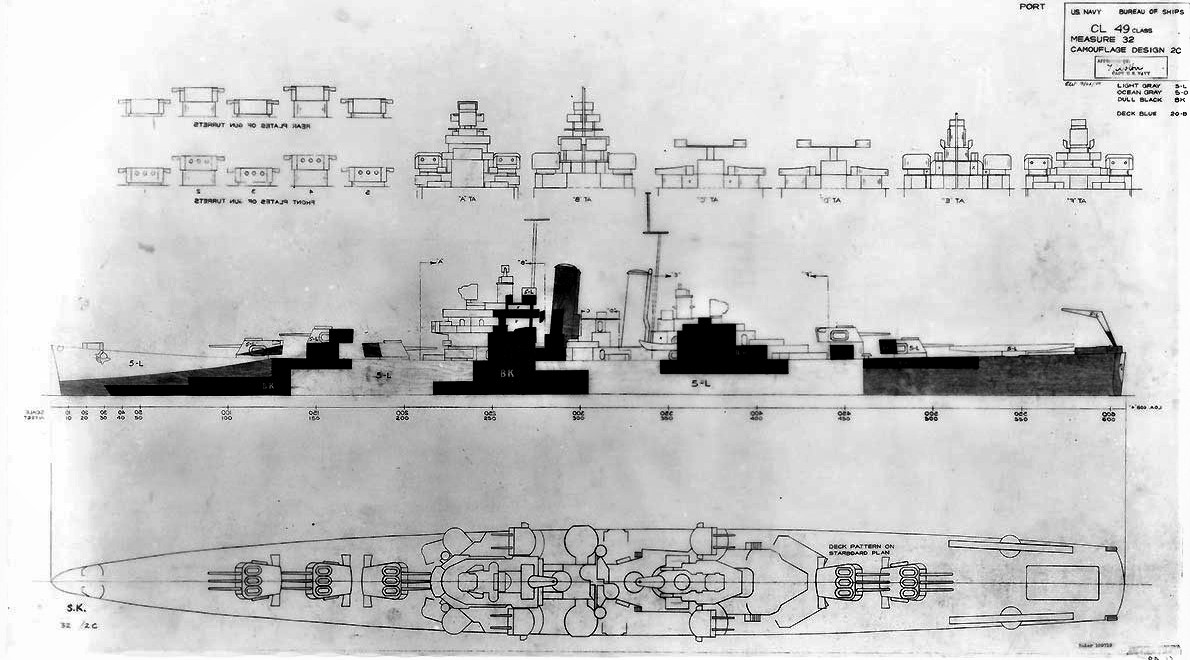
Plan and profile drawing of St. Louis in the camouflage scheme applied to the ship in 1944

As the major naval powers negotiated the London Naval Treaty in 1930, which contained a provision limiting the construction of heavy cruisers armed with 8-inch (203 mm) guns, United States naval designers came to the conclusion that with a displacement limited to 10,000 long tons (10,160 t), a better protected vessel could be built with an armament of 6 in (152 mm) guns. The designers also theorized that the much higher rate of fire of the smaller guns would allow a ship armed with twelve of the guns to overpower one armed with eight 8-inch guns. During the design process of the Brooklyn class, which began immediately after the treaty was signed, the US Navy became aware that the next class of Japanese cruisers, the Mogami class, would be armed with a main battery of fifteen 6-inch guns, prompting them to adopt the same number of guns for the Brooklyns. After building seven ships to the original design, additional changes were incorporated, particularly to the propulsion machinery and the secondary battery, resulting in what is sometimes referred to the St. Louis sub-class, which also included Helena. (Note: St. Louis and Helena are sometimes considered to be a distinct class separate from the rest of the Brooklyns, as the US Navy classified them as such. But the majority of naval historians describe them as either part of the Brooklyn class with no distinction, or as a sub-class, so this article follows that approach.)

St. Louis was 607 feet 4.125 inches (185 m) long overall and had a beam of 61 ft 7.5 in (18.783 m) and a draft of 22 ft 9 in (6.93 m). Her standard displacement amounted to 10,000 long tons (10,160 t) and increased to 12,207 long tons (12,403 t) at full load. The ship was powered by four Parsons steam turbines, each driving one propeller shaft, using steam provided by eight oil-fired Babcock & Wilcox boilers. Unlike the Brooklyns, the two St. Louis-class cruisers arranged their machinery in the unit system, alternating boiler and engine rooms. Rated at 100,000 shaft horsepower (75,000 kW), the turbines were intended to give a top speed of 32.5 knots (60.2 km/h; 37.4 mph). The ship had a cruising range of 10,000 nautical miles (18,520 km; 11,510 mi) at a speed of 15 knots (28 km/h; 17 mph). She carried four Curtiss SOC Seagull floatplanes for aerial reconnaissance, which were launched by a pair of aircraft catapults on her fantail. Her crew numbered 52 officers and 836 enlisted men.

The ship was armed with a main battery of fifteen 6 in /47 caliber Mark 16 guns (Note: /47 refers to the length of the gun in terms of calibers. A /47 gun is 47 times long as it is in bore diameter.) in five 3-gun turrets on the centerline. Three were placed forward, two of which were placed in a superfiring pair facing forward, with the third being directly pointed aft; the other two turrets were placed aft of the superstructure in another superfiring pair. The secondary battery consisted of eight 5 in (127 mm) /38 caliber dual purpose guns mounted in twin turrets, with one turret on either side of the conning tower and the other pair on either side of the aft superstructure. As designed, the ship was equipped with an anti-aircraft (AA) battery of eight 0.5 in (13 mm) guns, but her anti-aircraft battery was revised during her career. The ship's belt armor consisted of 5 inches on a layer of 0.625 in (15.9 mm) of special treatment steel and her deck armor was 2 in (51 mm) thick. The main battery turrets were protected with 6.5 in (170 mm) faces and they were supported by barbettes 6 inches thick. St. Louis's conning tower had 5-inch sides.

== Service history ==
The keel for St. Louis was laid down on 10 December 1936 at the Newport News Shipbuilding and Drydock Company in Newport News, Virginia. She was launched on 15 April 1938, and after completing fitting out work, was commissioned into active service on 19 May 1939, with the hull number CL-49. The ship was initially based in Norfolk, Virginia, for sea trials; her shakedown cruise concluded on 6 October, by which time World War II had broken out in Europe. She thereafter joined the Atlantic Fleet's Neutrality Patrols. During this period, on 3 September 1940, she embarked a group of officers to survey a number of locations in North and South America that the United States might obtain through the "destroyers for bases" deal with the United Kingdom. This voyage went as far north as Newfoundland in Canada and as far south as British Guiana, and ended on 27 October with her return to Norfolk.

On 9 November, St. Louis departed to join the Pacific Fleet. After passing through the Panama Canal on 14 November, she arrived in Pearl Harbor, Hawaii, on 12 December. She thereafter took part in the routine training exercises with the rest of the fleet through the winter of 1940–1941, followed by a trip to Mare Island Naval Shipyard in California for an overhaul. She arrived back in Pearl Harbor on 20 June and returned to operations with the fleet. In August, St. Louis and several other cruisers embarked on a voyage to the western Pacific; they conducted patrols between Wake Island, Midway Island, and Guam, before sailing for Manila in the Philippines. They arrived back in Pearl Harbor in late September. St. Louis was dry docked at the Pearl Harbor Naval Shipyard on 28 September for routine maintenance. By 7 December, she had returned to her usual mooring in the Southeast Loch.

=== World War II ===
At 07:56 on 7 December, men aboard St. Louis reported seeing Japanese aircraft overhead, beginning their attack on Pearl Harbor. Shortly thereafter, the order to general quarters was given, and the ship's anti-aircraft guns began to engage the attacking aircraft. The engine room crew had begun preparations to get the ship underway by 08:06. Fourteen minutes later, the anti-aircraft gunners had shot down a Japanese aircraft, and by 09:00, had downed another pair. The ship slipped from her mooring at 09:31 and steamed toward the South Channel. Her 6-inch guns were quickly restored to operation as the crew prepared for the possibility of a surface action.

A Japanese midget submarine that was in the channel entrance attempted to torpedo St. Louis, but the torpedoes struck a shoal some 200 yd (180 m) from the ship and exploded harmlessly. Destroyers arrived and dropped depth charges on the submarine, allowing St. Louis to proceed to open waters without further interruption. The ship took part in the unsuccessful search for the Japanese carrier strike force, but by 10 December, she had returned to Pearl Harbor. St. Louis thereafter escorted transport ships that evacuated casualties to California and brought reinforcements to Hawaii.

==== 1942 ====
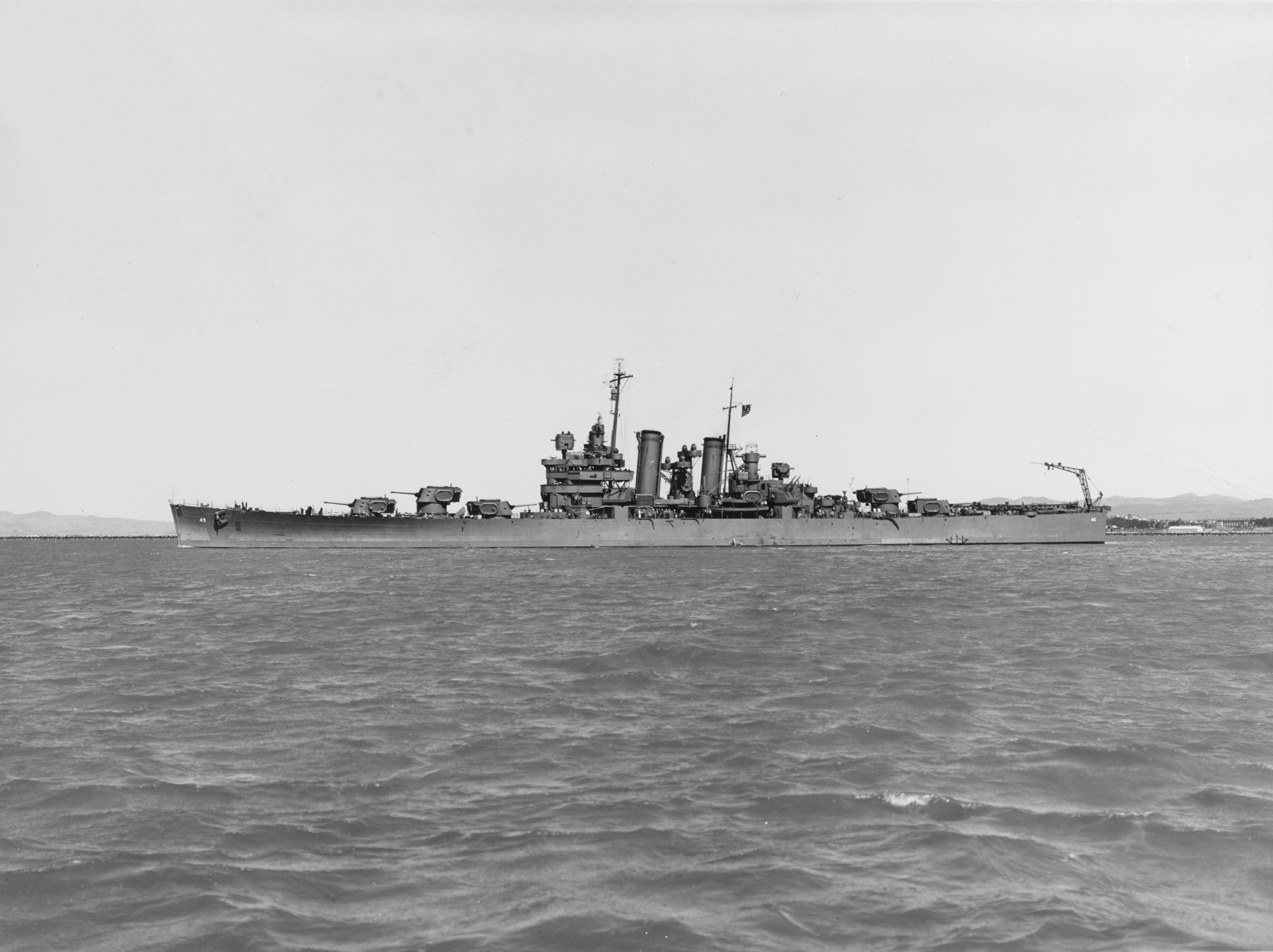
St. Louis off Mare Island in March 1942

St. Louis thereafter joined Task Force 17 (TF 17), which was centered on the aircraft carrier Yorktown. The unit left San Francisco on 6 January 1942 as an escort for troop ships carrying a Marine expeditionary force to American Samoa to strengthen the garrison there. The troops were disembarked at Pago Pago between 20 and 24 January, and TF 17 then moved to launch a series of air strikes in concert with Task Force 8 on the Japanese-held Marshall and Gilbert island groups. In response, the Japanese sent several submarines and elements of the 1st Air Fleet to launch a counter-attack, but they recalled both groups before making contact with either American task force. The ships thereafter returned to Pearl Harbor on 7 February.

St. Louis was then detached from TF 17 to resume escorting convoys between Hawaii and California, along with one to the New Hebrides. She next joined the escort for the ocean liner President Coolidge, which was carrying Manuel L. Quezon, the President of the Philippines, to the United States. The ships arrived in San Francisco on 8 May, and the next day, St. Louis got underway to return to Pearl Harbor. There, she joined a group of ships carrying reinforcements to Midway during the preparations for the Battle of Midway. St. Louis was used to carry two companies of the 2nd Marine Raider Battalion and a battery of 37 mm (1.5 in) guns. The ships offloaded aircraft and marines on 25 May, and St. Louis was then transferred to Task Force 8, which was sailing north to bring reinforcements to the Aleutian Islands. At that time, the unit also included her sister ships Honolulu and Nashville, the heavy cruisers Louisville and Indianapolis, and fourteen destroyers, commanded by Rear Admiral (RADM) Robert Alfred Theobald.

TF 8 arrived in Kodiak Island on 31 May, where St. Louis refueled in preparation for patrol duty to the south of the Alaskan Peninsula. She conducted these operations through July, and on 3 August, she got underway to bombard Japanese positions on Kiska in the Aleutians. After shelling the island on 7 August, she returned to Kodiak four days later and then resumed patrols in the area. She took part in the occupation of Adak Island. St. Louis left the Aleutians on 25 October by way of Dutch Harbor for another overhaul at Mare Island, which was completed by early December.

==== 1943–1944: Solomons Islands campaign ====
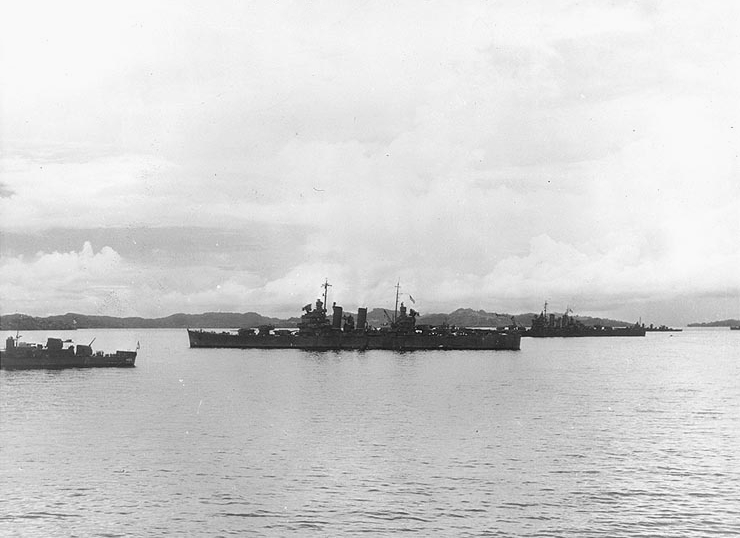
Honolulu (center) and St. Louis (right, behind Honolulu) off Tulagi in April 1943

St. Louis left San Francisco on 4 December as part of the escort for a convoy of transport ships en route to New Caledonia. The ships arrived on 21 December, where St. Louis separated from the convoy to join Allied forces waging the Solomon Islands campaign. She moved first to Espiritu Santo in the New Hebrides, and from there, embarked on her first offensive operations in January 1943, conducting bombardments of Japanese positions at Munda and Kolombangara, particularly targeting the airfields there. Over the next five months, she participated in numerous patrols in "the Slot" and raids against Japanese positions in the area. The former were intended to block Japanese reinforcement missions—the so-called "Tokyo Express". During this period, the ship suffered a number of accidents, including jammed guns and the loss of one of her anchors, which tore a hole in the bow as it fell.

The first of these raids took place from 1 to 4 January, when St. Louis covered a group of seven transports carrying elements of the 25th Infantry Division to Guadalcanal. The unit at that time included six other cruisers and five destroyers, and was commanded by RADM Walden L. Ainsworth. Ainsworth left four cruisers and three destroyers to cover the convoy on the 4th, taking St. Louis, Helena, and Nashville, and two destroyers to bombard Munda in the early hours of 5 January. The ships fired a total of some 4,000 shells, but inflicted little significant damage to the Japanese airfield. The ships returned to Guadalcanal at 09:00 and began recovering their reconnaissance floatplanes when a Japanese airstrike arrived and damaged two of the other cruisers. St. Louis and the rest of the unit carried out a bombardment of Vila on the night of 23–24 January; St. Louis formed part of the covering force and did not take an active role in the attack. St. Louis and the rest of the unit were to conduct another attack on Munda on the night of 7–8 April, but a major Japanese air raid earlier on the 7th disrupted Allied plans and forced Ainsworth's task force to flee south.

St. Louis and the rest of TF 68 conducted a sweep into Vella Gulf on the night of 6–7 May to distract Japanese attention from a group of fast minelayers that laid a minefield off New Georgia to block re-supply efforts. The ships encountered no Japanese opposition that night, but late on 7 May, four destroyers stumbled into the minefield. Three destroyers struck mines, one of which sank immediately, and the other two were sunk by American aircraft the following morning. On 12 May, TF 68 made another raid on Japanese positions in the area; St. Louis and the destroyers Jenkins and Fletcher were detached from the main force to bombard Munda while the rest of the ships attacked Vila.

===== Landing at Rice Anchorage =====
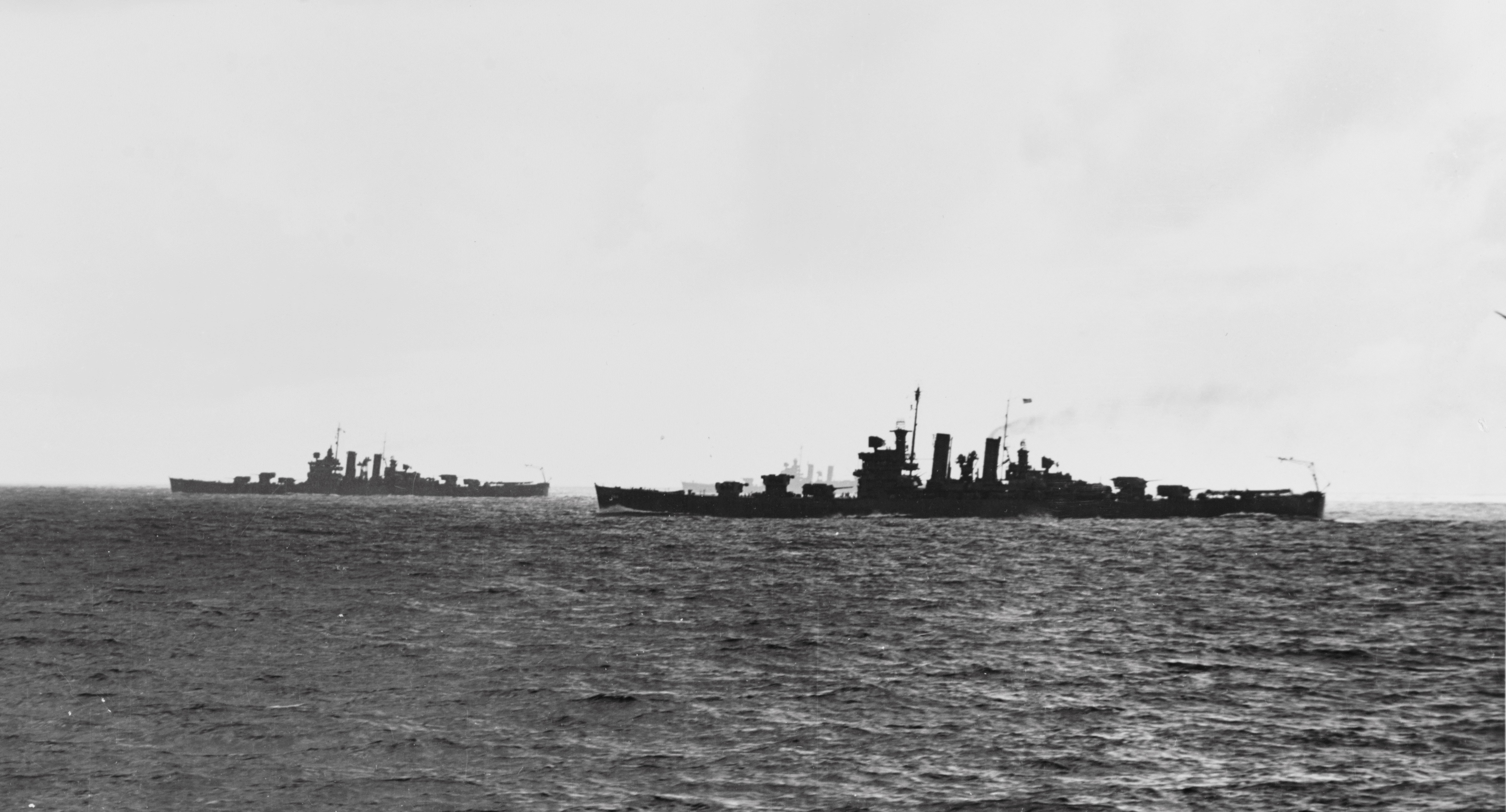
Helena (right) underway with St. Louis (left) and Honolulu (center, behind Helena) in June 1943

The invasion of New Georgia began on 30 June; St. Louis and the rest of TF 68 patrolled at the northern end of the Coral Sea; at that time, she cruised with Helena, Honolulu, and their escorting destroyer screen that consisted of O'Bannon, Nicholas, Chevalier, and Strong. By 1 July, the ships were about 300 nmi (560 km; 350 mi) south of New Georgia, and on 3 July they reached Tulagi, where a false report of a Japanese airstrike briefly sent the ships' crews to their battle stations. The Allied plan called for a second landing on New Georgia in the Kula Gulf on the northeastern side of the island. A landing here would block the resupply route for the Japanese forces fighting on the island and it would also deny their use of the gulf to escape once they were defeated, as they had done on Guadalcanal.

Nicholas and Strong reached Kula Gulf first, scanning it with their radar and sonar sets to determine if any Japanese warships were in the area. The cruisers and other two destroyers then entered the gulf to prepare to bombard Japanese positions at Vila. Honolulu opened fire first at 00:26 on 5 July, followed quickly by the other ships. Black Cats circling overhead coordinated the ships' fire. The bombardment lasted about fourteen minutes before the American column turned east to move to the Rice Anchorage to shell targets there. After another six minutes of shooting, the ships departed.Unbeknownst to the Americans, the three Japanese destroyers had arrived in the gulf while they were still shooting. Illuminated by the gun flashes, the American vessels were quickly identified by the Japanese over 6 nmi (11 km; 6.9 mi) away.

The transport group then entered the gulf and steamed close to the shore to prevent intermingling with Ainsworth's squadron, which had turned north at 12:39 to leave the gulf. Captain Kanaoka Kunizo, the senior destroyer commander in charge of the reinforcement operation, decided to withdraw as well to avoid engaging a superior force with his ships loaded with soldiers and supplies. Niizuki, the only radar-equipped destroyer, directed the aim of all three vessels, which launched a total of fourteen Long Lance torpedoes before withdrawing at high speed to escape back to Bougainville. One of these torpedoes struck Strong, which was still stationed at the entrance of the gulf on sentry duty. The destroyer was fatally damaged, but the attack alerted Ainsworth that there were Japanese warships in the area. O'Bannon and Chevalier were detached to pick up survivors while Ainsworth prepared to search for the submarine he assumed to have been responsible, as none of his ships had detected the three Japanese destroyers on their radars. Strong sank at 01:22, with 239 of her crew taken off by the other destroyers, though some additional survivors were missed in the darkness and were later picked up by the transport group. Ainsworth's ships then resumed their cruising formation at 02:15 for the voyage back to Tulagi.

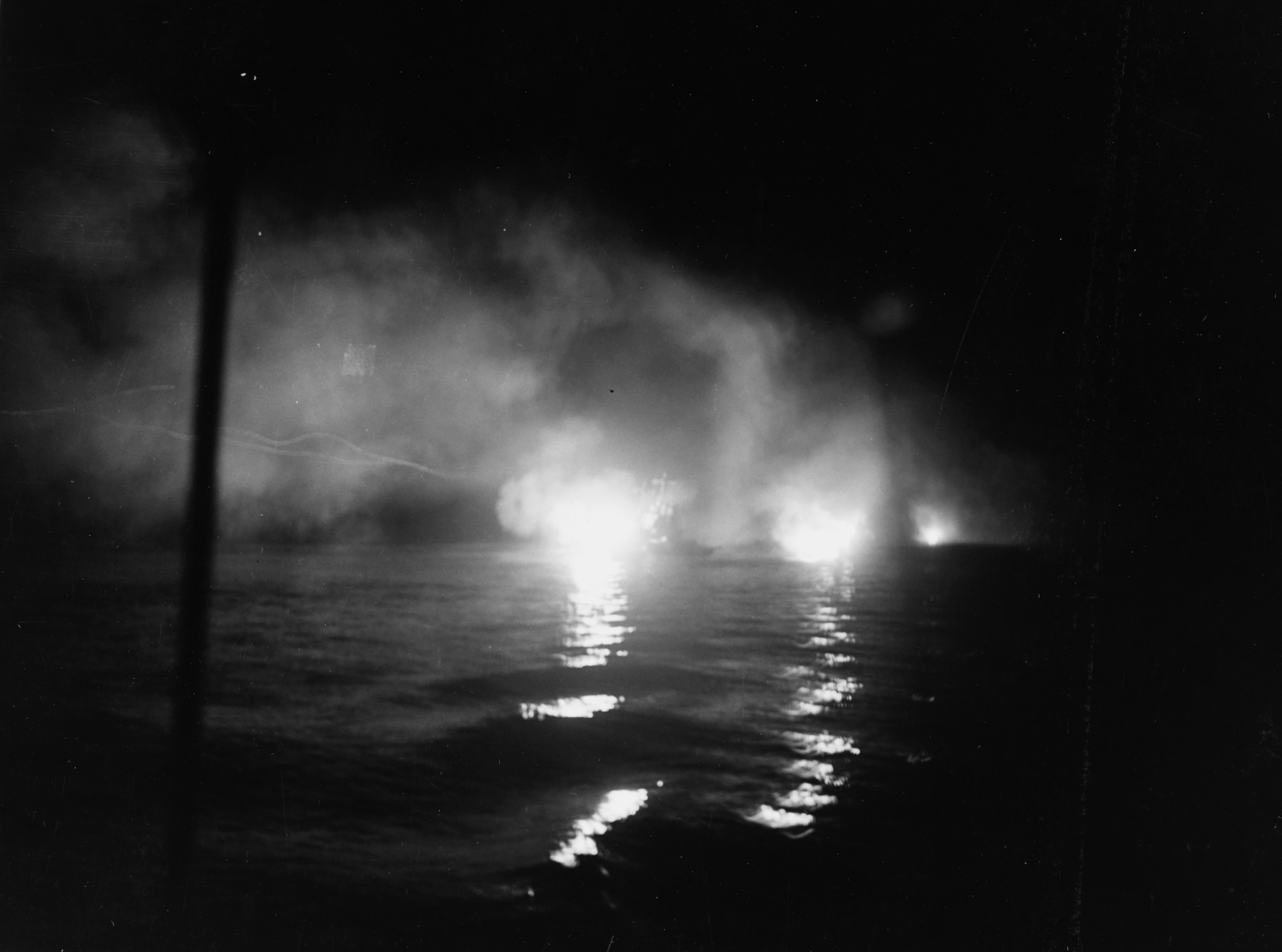
USS Helena and St. Louis in action at Kula Gulf, seen from USS Honolulu

At 07:00, Jenkins joined the squadron, which reached Tulagi in the early afternoon, where the ships immediately began refueling. Shortly thereafter, Ainsworth received orders from Halsey to return to Kula Gulf, as reconnaissance aircraft had spotted Japanese destroyers departing from Bougainville to attempt the planned reinforcement run that he had inadvertently disrupted the night before. Ainsworth was to intercept the destroyers and prevent the landing of more Japanese forces on the island. He ordered the ships to end refueling and prepare to get underway; Jenkins replaced Strong and the destroyer Radford took the place of Chevalier, which had been damaged in an accidental collision with the sinking Strong.

===== Battle of Kula Gulf =====
Since the previous night's reinforcement run had been aborted, the Japanese assembled a group of ten destroyers to make a larger effort the next night. Niizuki—now the flagship of Rear Admiral Teruo Akiyama—and the destroyers Suzukaze and Tanikaze were to escort the other seven destroyers—Nagatsuki, Mochizuki, Mikazuki, Hamakaze, Amagiri, Hatsuyuki, and Satsuki—carried 2,400 troops and supplies. Meanwhile, the American force intending to block their advance had formed up by 19:30 and began the voyage back up the Slot. As the Americans steamed toward Kula Gulf, the crews got their vessels ready for action, including closing all of the watertight doors to reduce the risk of flooding and turning off all lights to prevent detection by the Japanese.

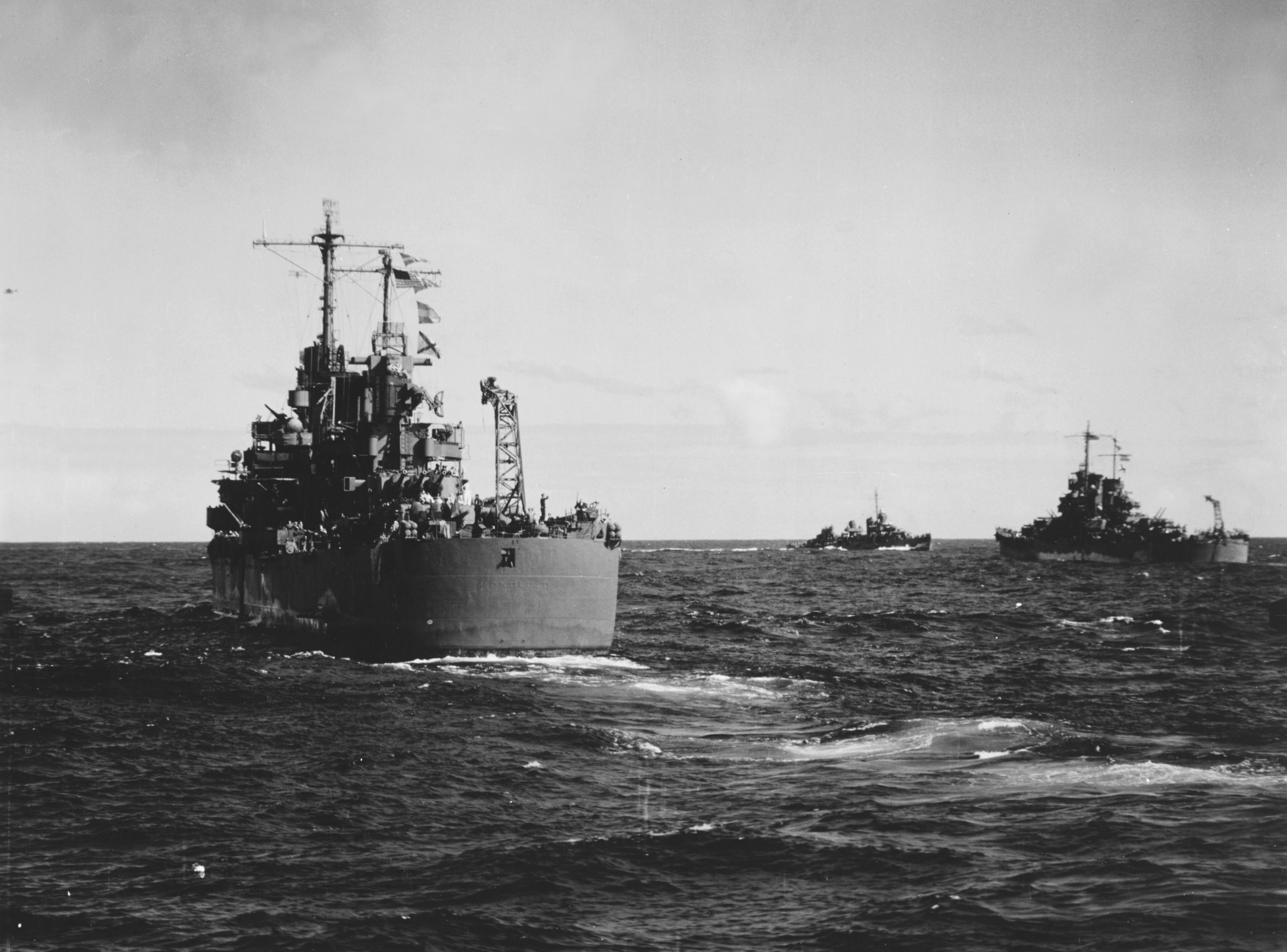
Honolulu (left) and St. Louis (right) returning from the Battle of Kula Gulf

The American squadron passed Visuvisu Point at the entrance to the gulf early on 6 July, at which point the vessels reduced speed to 25 knots (46 km/h; 29 mph). Visibility was poor owing to heavy cloud cover. Ainsworth had no information as to the specific composition or location of the Japanese force, and patrolling Black Cats could not detect them in the conditions. The Japanese destroyers had already entered the gulf and begun unloading their cargoes; Niizuki detected the American ships on her radar at 01:06 at a range of about 13 nmi (24 km; 15 mi). Akiyama took his flagship, Suzukaze, and Tanikaze to observe the Americans at 01:43 while the other destroyers continued to disembark the soldiers and supplies; by that time, Ainsworth's ships had already detected the three ships off Kolombangara at 01:36. As the two sides continued to close, Akiyama recalled the other destroyers to launch an attack. The American vessels transitioned into a line ahead formation, with Nicholas and O'Bannon ahead of the cruisers; the line turned left to close the range to the Japanese vessels before turning right to move toward an advantageous firing position.

The American radars picked up Akiyama's escort detachment along with another group of destroyers that was racing to join him; Ainsworth decided to attack the first group and then turn about to engage the second. At about 01:57, the American vessels opened up with radar-directed rapid fire. Between the three cruisers, they fired around close to 1,500 shells from their 6-inch batteries in the span of just five minutes. Niizuki received heavy fire from the other American ships and was quickly sunk, taking Akiyama down with her. But by that time, Suzukaze and Tanikaze had both launched eight torpedoes at the American line. They then fled to the northwest, using heavy smoke to conceal themselves while their crews reloaded their torpedo tubes. Both destroyers received minor hits during their temporary withdrawal but were not seriously damaged.

Ainsworth instructed his ships to turn to the right at 02:03 to begin engaging the second group of destroyers, but shortly thereafter three of Suzukaze's or Tanikaze's torpedoes struck Helena on the port side, inflicting serious, ultimately fatal damage. Ainsworth and the other vessels' captains were not immediately aware that Helena had been disabled owing to the course change, the general confusion that resulted from heavy smoke and gunfire during the battle, and the fact that most attention was directed at the oncoming second group of Japanese destroyers. In the ensuing action, several of the Japanese destroyers were hit and forced to disengage, after which Ainsworth attempted to reorganize his force at around 02:30. He quickly realized that Helena was not responding to radio messages and ordered his ships to begin searching for the missing cruiser. At 03:13, Radford's radar picked up a contact and thereafter confirmed it was Helena's sinking wreck.

===== Battle of Kolombangara =====
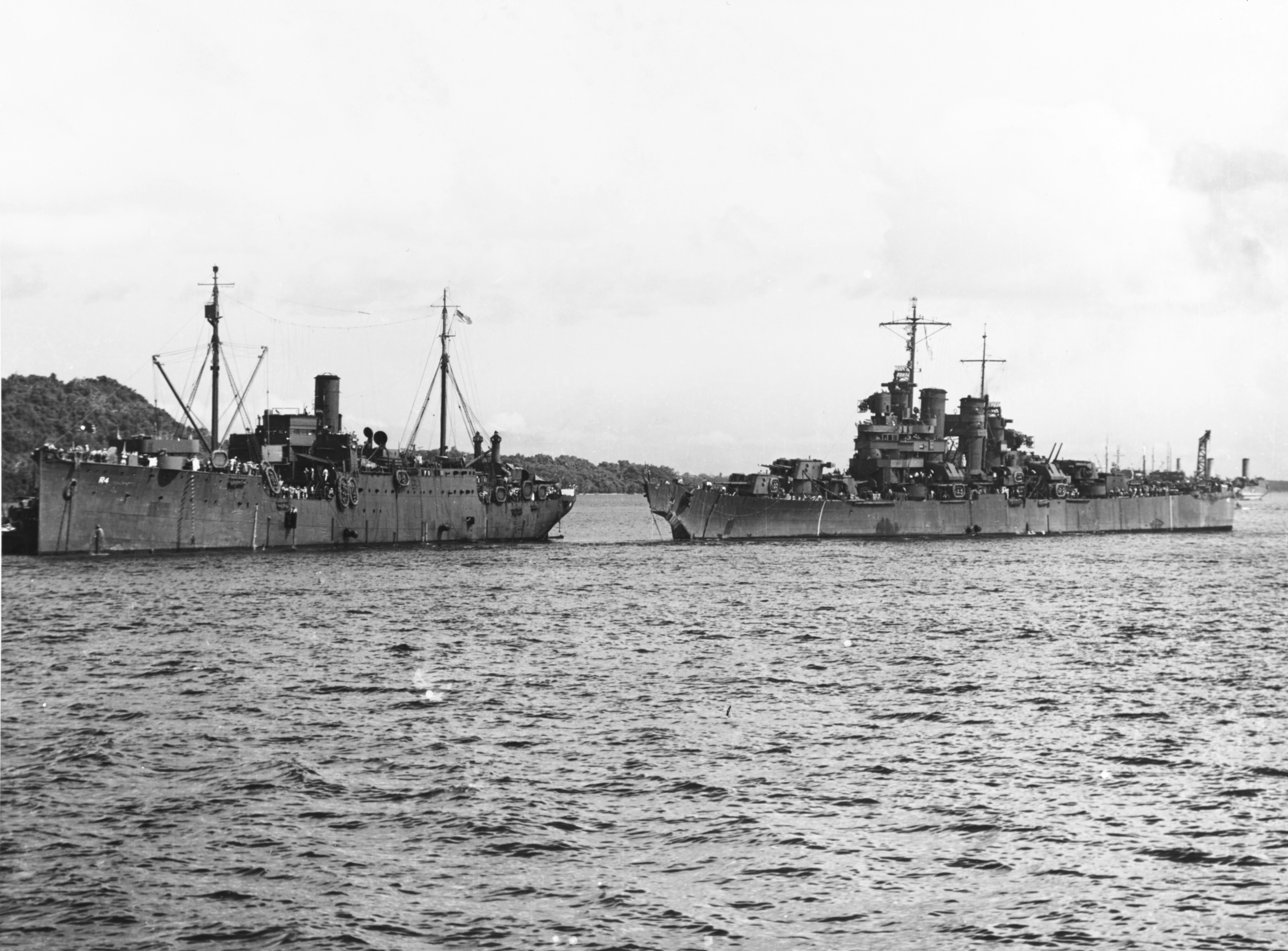
St. Louis coming alongside the repair ship Vestal after the Battle of Kolombangara, showing torpedo damage to her bow

By 12 July, St. Louis's unit had by then been re-designated to either Task Force 18 or 36.1 (Note: According to the historian Jürgen Rohwer in Chronology of the War at Sea, the unit was Task Force 36.1, but Samuel Eliot Morison's official History of United States Naval Operations in World War II gives the unit as Task Force 18.) At that time, the unit consisted of St. Louis, Honolulu, and the light cruiser Leander of the Royal New Zealand Navy, along with Destroyer Squadrons 21 and 12; it was still commanded by Ainsworth. The unit embarked on another patrol that evening, departing Tulagi at 17:00 on 12 July. Ainsworth sent his ships to general quarters at around 23:00. The Japanese supply convoy in the area that Ainsworth hoped to intercept was equipped with radar-detection equipment, and had already picked up Allied radar signals. Shortly after 01:00 on 13 July, the Allies encountered the Japanese force commanded by Rear Admiral Shunji Isaki, which was composed of the light cruiser Jintsu and five destroyers, escorting a group of four destroyer-transports.

The Japanese spotted the Allied ships first, but the leading American destroyers launched their torpedoes first. In the ensuing Battle of Kolombangara, Jintsu and the destroyers launched a spread of torpedoes at the Allied squadron before the cruisers closed to within 10,000 yd (9,100 m), where their gunnery control and search radars could effectively direct their shooting. All three cruisers concentrated their fire on Jintsu, she being the largest radar contact; after a few minutes of rapid fire, the ship exploded and, after being hit by a torpedo from one of the destroyers, quickly sank. The initial salvo of torpedoes missed, but the Japanese destroyers briefly retreated into a rain squall to reload their torpedo tubes before reemerging to launch another salvo. Leander was hit and fell out of the formation while St. Louis and Honolulu pursued the retreating Japanese destroyers. They opened fire, engaging the destroyer Mikazuki and what was probably the still-burning wreck of Jintsu. The Americans thereafter lost contact with the Japanese ships.

At around 01:56, Honolulu picked up a group of unidentified ships some 26,000 yd (24,000 m) away. Unsure of the identity of the vessels, which might have been his destroyers, Ainsworth held his cruisers' fire. At 02:03, he ordered star shells to illuminate the ships, which were immediately revealed to be the fleeing Japanese destroyers, which had just launched another salvo of torpedoes and turned away. St. Louis was hit by one of them in her bow at 02:08, before she could open fire, and shortly thereafter, Honolulu also received a minor torpedo hit. The destroyer USS Gwin was hit amidships and quickly sank. Casualties aboard St. Louis were light. Despite the fact that they had sunk Jintsu and drove off the destroyers, the Allied squadron had failed to prevent the destroyer-transports from reaching Kolombangara and landing 1,200 soldiers.

The Allied ships returned to Tulagi later on 13 July, and St. Louis was detached to return to the United States for repairs. She steamed first to Espiritu Santo for temporary work that would allow her to make the crossing to Mare Island Navy Yard, where permanent repairs were carried out. The work was completed by November, and included replacing her worn-out main battery guns, and swapping her poorly performing 1.1-inch anti-aircraft guns with 40 mm (1.6 in) Bofors guns.

===== Later operations =====
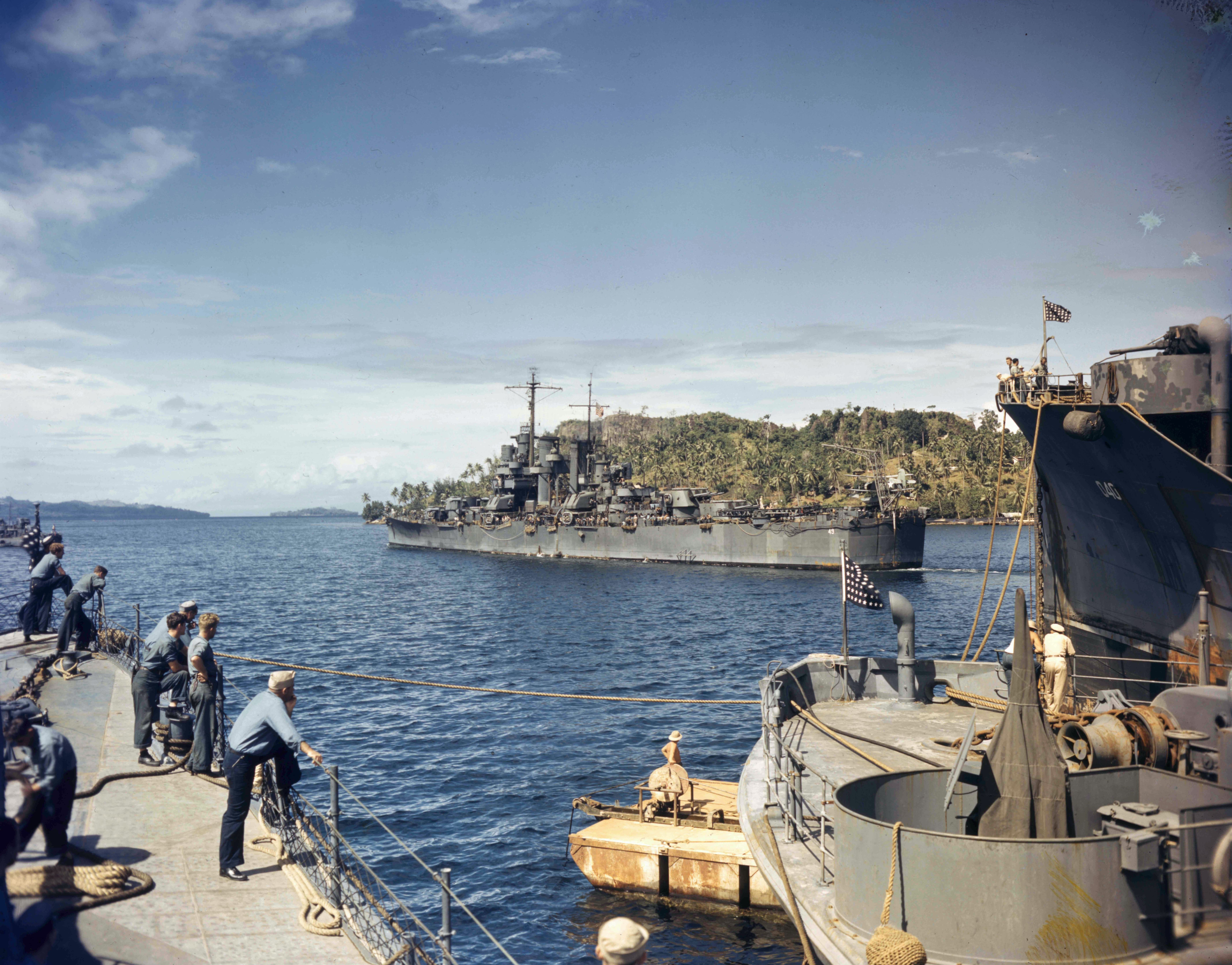
St. Louis in Tulagi in 1943

St. Louis arrived back in the Solomons in mid-November, and immediately resumed combat operations. From 20 to 25 November, she provided naval gunfire support to marines fighting on Bougainville. Further bombardment missions against Japanese forces on the island followed in December. In early January 1944, she moved south to the Shortland Islands to attack Japanese positions there. St. Louis then moved back north to Bougainville, where she joined the bombardment force that supported the landing at Cape Torokina. She returned to Tulagi on 10 January to begin preparations for the next major operation. This came in the form of the Battle of the Green Islands in February, an Allied amphibious assault on the Green Islands. The seizure of the islands, which were to the east of New Britain, was intended to isolate the Japanese base at Rabaul. St. Louis arrived off the island on 13 February to begin the bombardment for the assault, which was to come two days later. By that time, the ship had been assigned to Task Force 38, along with Honolulu.

Late in the day on 14 February, the Japanese launched an air attack consisting of six Aichi D3A "Val" dive bombers against the American formation. At 18:55, lookouts spotted the aircraft; two of them targeted St. Louis. The first failed to score any hits with its three bombs, but the second aircraft struck St. Louis with one of its bombs. It passed through the shell handling room for the No. 6 Bofors gun mount, starting a fire as it did so, before exploding in the midship living compartment, where it killed twenty-three and wounded another twenty. Damage control efforts quickly suppressed the fire. The ship's ventilation system was damaged, the communication line to the aft engine room was severed, and both of her aircraft were disabled, but St. Louis remained on station, albeit at the reduced speed of 18 knots (33 km/h; 21 mph). The next day, another Japanese air strike failed to inflict any further damage to St. Louis, but she was nevertheless detached to return to Purvis Bay for repairs that lasted until the end of the month. In March, she returned to her unit and remained operating in the Solomons through May.

==== Marianas campaign ====
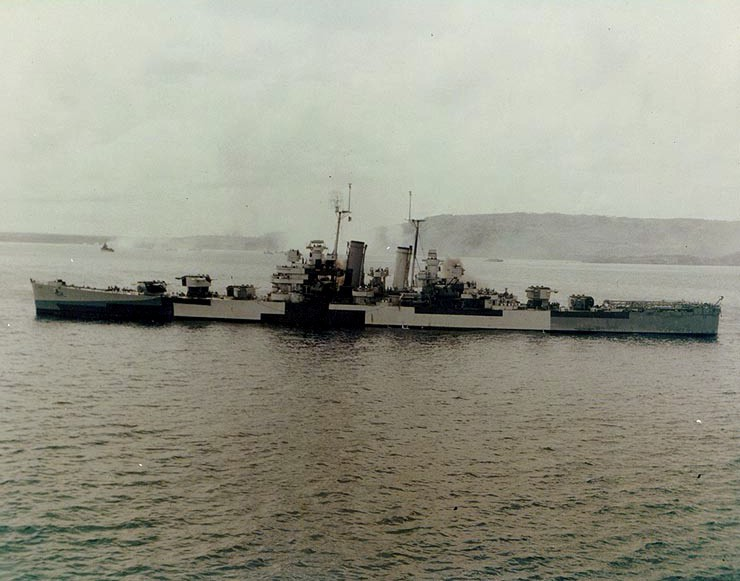
St. Louis bombarding Guam

St. Louis left the Solomons on 4 June, bound for the Marshalls, where she joined Task Force 52, which had been formed for the invasion of the Mariana and Palau Islands campaign in the central Pacific. St. Louis was assigned to one of the task force's bombardment groups, Task Group 52.10, under the command of Ainsworth. The unit included the old dreadnought battleships Pennsylvania, Idaho, and New Mexico, five other cruisers, and nine destroyers, along with several support vessels. The invasion fleet departed on 10 June and arrived off Saipan on the 14th; the next day, St. Louis began bombarding the area around Chalan Kanoa at the start of the Battle of Saipan. The next day, the 2nd and 4th Marine Divisions landed on the island. As the American forces fought their way ashore, St. Louis remained close offshore to engage Japanese defensive positions. The following day, she sailed south to take part in the preparatory bombardment of Guam. On 17 June, she resumed operations off Saipan, where she remained through the Battle of the Philippine Sea. She was assigned to the anti-aircraft screen for the refueling group on 22 June, before being detached two days later to return to the Marshalls. By 9 July, the Japanese garrison on Saipan had been defeated.

The ship got underway again on 14 July to return to operations in the Marianas. By that time, Ainsworth's command had been re-numbered TG 53.5 though its composition remained largely the same. While en route on the 15th, her No. 3 propeller was damaged and a 39 ft (12 m) section of that propeller shaft was destroyed. She reached Guam two days later and on the afternoon of 17 July, provided fire support as underwater demolition teams (UDT) dismantled fixed defenses at the planned landing sites. St. Louis thereafter took part in the pre-invasion bombardment, which lasted until 21 July, when American ground forces went ashore. The ship thereafter supported the soldiers and marines fighting on the island for more than a week, before departing on 29 July to return to port for repairs. She stopped in Pearl Harbor on the way to California, where her overhaul was performed. In mid-October, she returned to Hawaii for training operations that lasted through the rest of the month. She then crossed the Pacific to rejoin the main fleet, which had already begun the Philippines campaign. She arrived in Leyte Gulf on 16 November.

==== Philippines campaign ====
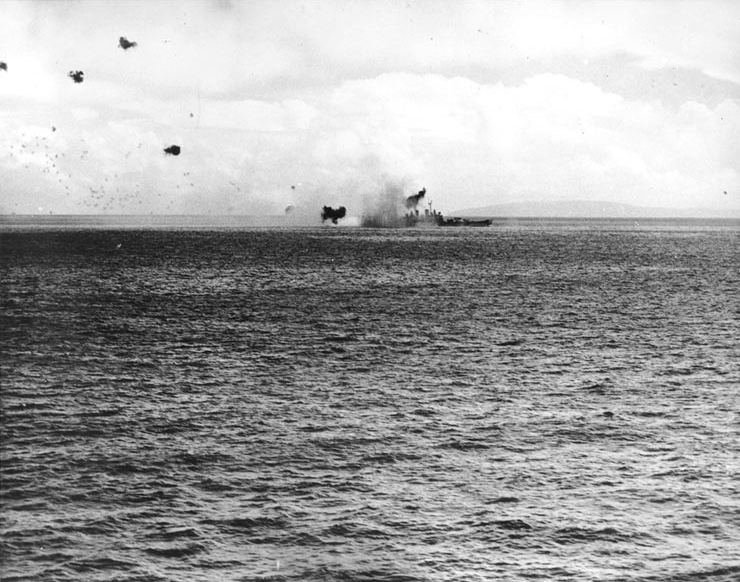
St. Louis hit by a kamikaze off Leyte, 27 November 1944

For the rest of November, St. Louis helped to defend the fleet from air attacks, patrolling in Leyte Gulf and the Surigao Strait. The ship was at that time part of Task Group 77.2, which included the old battleships Maryland, West Virginia, and Colorado, three other cruisers, and sixteen destroyers. On 27 November, the Japanese launched a major counter-attack against Allied forces on and off Leyte, including heavy kamikaze attacks on the Allied fleet. St. Louis was one of the vessels that was to come under sustained attack over the course of the action.

The first wave of twelve to fourteen aircraft appeared late in the morning, but St. Louis was not damaged. This attack prompted calls for support from the fleet's combat air patrol (CAP). At around 11:30, a second wave of ten aircraft arrived, and at 11:38, a D3A dive bomber on a kamikaze attack struck the ship, detonating its remaining fuel and the bomb it was carrying. The blast killed or wounded all of the 20 mm gun crews from mounts 7 through 10 and started a fire in the ship's aircraft hangar. Immediately thereafter, at 11:39, a second burning aircraft nearly struck the ship, but St. Louis was able to evade the attempt, and the Japanese pilot flew over the No. 4 main battery turret and crashed into the sea about 100 yd (91 m) from the ship.

A third wave appeared shortly before noon, and CAP support had still not arrived to fend them off. A pair of Japanese aircraft dove on St. Louis at 11:51. The ship's anti-aircraft gunners successfully shot down the first kamikaze, but the second crashed into the ship's port side, tearing a 20 ft (6.1 m) length of belt armor from the ship and punching numerous holes in the hull. St. Louis immediately began to take on a list to port as water entered the ship. Another kamikaze attempted to attack at 12:10, but it was shot down about 400 yd (370 m) from the ship. At around 12:20, a group of torpedo bombers attacked St. Louis, but the cruiser had been warned of their approach by a PT boat and was able to evade the torpedoes.

Damage control teams made quick progress, and by 12:36, counter-flooding had restored the ship to an even keel. By around 13:00, the fires had been suppressed, and salvage work had begun on the damaged parts of the ship. The attacks had killed fifteen and wounded forty-three, of whom twenty-one were badly injured. Another man was missing. St. Louis transferred the seriously wounded men to a hospital ship on 28 November, and two days later, she anchored at San Pedro Bay for temporary repairs. She then sailed for California for permanent repairs in late December.

==== Volcano and Ryukyu Islands campaign ====
Work on St. Louis was completed by 1 March 1945, when the ship got underway to return to the fleet. She arrived at the fleet's advance anchorage at Ulithi in mid-March and joined the anti-aircraft screen of the fast carrier task force. St. Louis was assigned to Task Group 58.4, escorting the aircraft carriers Yorktown, Intrepid, and Langley in company with the fast battleships Missouri, Wisconsin, and New Jersey, the large cruisers Alaska and Guam, three other cruisers, and eighteen destroyers. In late March, the carriers launched a series of air strikes on the Japanese Home Islands. The Japanese responded with a kamikaze counter-attack that primarily targeted TG 58.4. Intrepid and Yorktown were both damaged in the raid, but St. Louis was not attacked.

St. Louis was then assigned to Task Force 54, the bombardment group assigned to the preparatory attack on Okinawa. She took part in attacks on the invasion beaches, covered UDT groups, and protected minesweepers as the invasion of Okinawa neared. On 26 March, lookouts aboard St. Louis and the heavy cruiser Wichita spotted torpedo tracks, but the Japanese submarine that launched the torpedoes could not be immediately located. On 31 March, St. Louis steamed to the staging area at Kerama Retto to replenish ammunition and stores. The next day, she arrived back off Hagushi to support the landing there. St. Louis remained off the invasion beaches until 6 April, when she was detached to escort a group of minesweepers working off Iwo Jima, which had been conquered earlier that year in the Battle of Iwo Jima. The ship thereafter returned to Okinawa, where she provided gunfire support off Hagushi through mid-May. On 18 May, she was sent to Leyte to relieve the crew after more than a month of constant operations. The ship returned to Okinawa in mid-June, though the campaign there was in its final days.

Beginning in mid-July, St. Louis began to operate with Task Force 95, assigned to Task Unit 2, along with the old battleships Nevada and California, and the cruisers Salt Lake City, Chester, and Wichita. TU 2 formed half of Task Group 95.3, together with Task Unit 1, which consisted of the escort carriers Makin Island, Lunga Point, and Cape Gloucester. Over the course of the next month, the task group patrolled off Okinawa to defend against Japanese air attacks and conducted sweeps into the East China Sea, to search for Japanese merchant shipping and carry out strikes against targets in occupied China. In early August, St. Louis returned to Buckner Bay, Okinawa, where she remained through 15 August, when the end of the war was announced. Over the course of the conflict, St. Louis earned eleven battle stars.

=== Post-war ===
St. Louis remained in East Asian waters for more than two months after the end of the war. She moved to the Philippines in late August, where she was assigned to Task Force 73, the Yangtze River Patrol Force. She had returned to Buckner Bay by September, where other vessels that had been assigned to the unit were being collected. In October, the ships sailed to Shanghai, China, and later that month, she took part in an operation to move elements of the Chinese Army to Taiwan, which had been under Japanese occupation.

The ship was thereafter used as part of Operation Magic Carpet, the effort to repatriate American forces after the war. Her first such voyage ended at San Francisco on 9 November, and she made a further two by mid-January 1946. These included voyages to various islands in the central and southwestern Pacific. These duties completed, St. Louis left for Philadelphia in early February, arriving there on the 25th of the month. There, she was decommissioned on 20 June and moored at League Island in the Delaware River, part of the 16th (Inactive) Fleet. She remained there into the early 1950s.

=== Transfer to Brazil ===
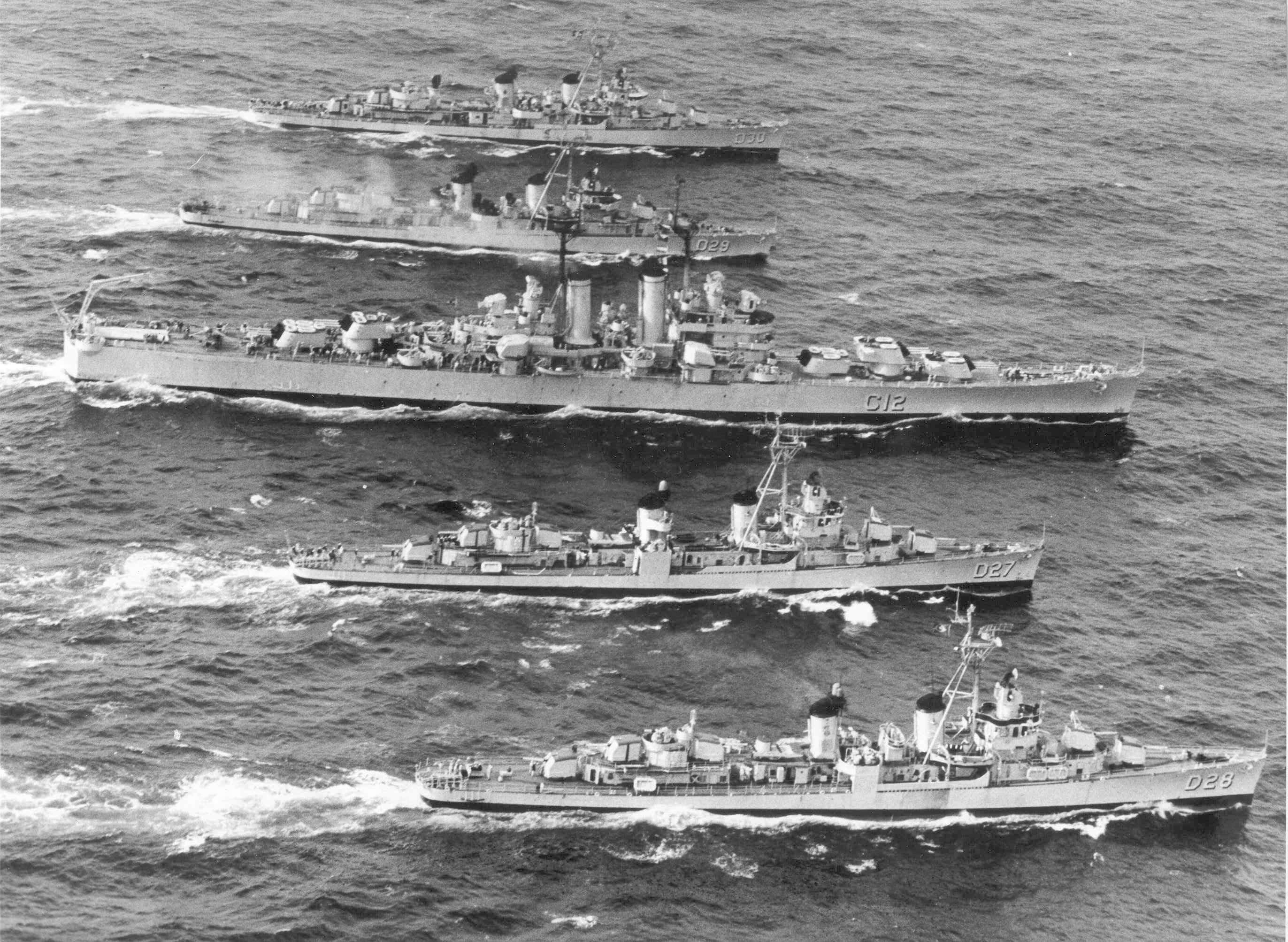
Squadron of the Brazilian Navy. In the center, the cruiser Almirante Tamandaré, surrounded by four Fletcher-class destroyers.

In the early 1950s, as the US Navy sought to reduce the number of surplus vessels in its inventory, St. Louis was allocated to the Brazilian Navy. She was stricken from the US Naval Vessel Register on 22 January 1951 and commissioned into Brazilian service on 29 January as Almirante Tamandaré.

During a period of political instability in 1955, Carlos Luz briefly seized power after the acting president, Café Filho, fell ill on 8 November. Luz was himself deposed three days later, and he fled aboard Tamandaré, which was moored in Guanabara Bay off Rio de Janeiro, awaiting work on her boilers. At that time, the ship's captain was Silvio Heck; also aboard was Admiral Carlos Pena Boto. Luz sought to flee the capital to Santos, and when the ship passed out of the bay, the coastal fortifications guarding its entrance opened fire on Tamandaré, but scored no hits. Luz was formally removed from power and the governor of São Paulo barred him from entering the area. Tamandaré brought him back to Rio de Janeiro on the 13th, where he left the ship.

She served as the Fleet Flagship until 1976. She was deployed as part of the force in the Lobster War between Brazil and France.

Tamandaré was stricken from the naval register in 1973 and was laid up until 1980, when she was sold to ship breakers based in Taiwan. While being towed there on 24 August, she foundered off South Africa.

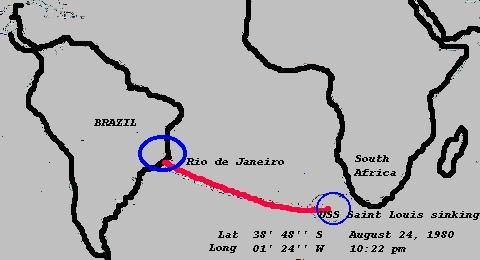
Sink- USS CL-49
