= Japanese destroyer Nagatsuki (1926) =

Japanese destroyer

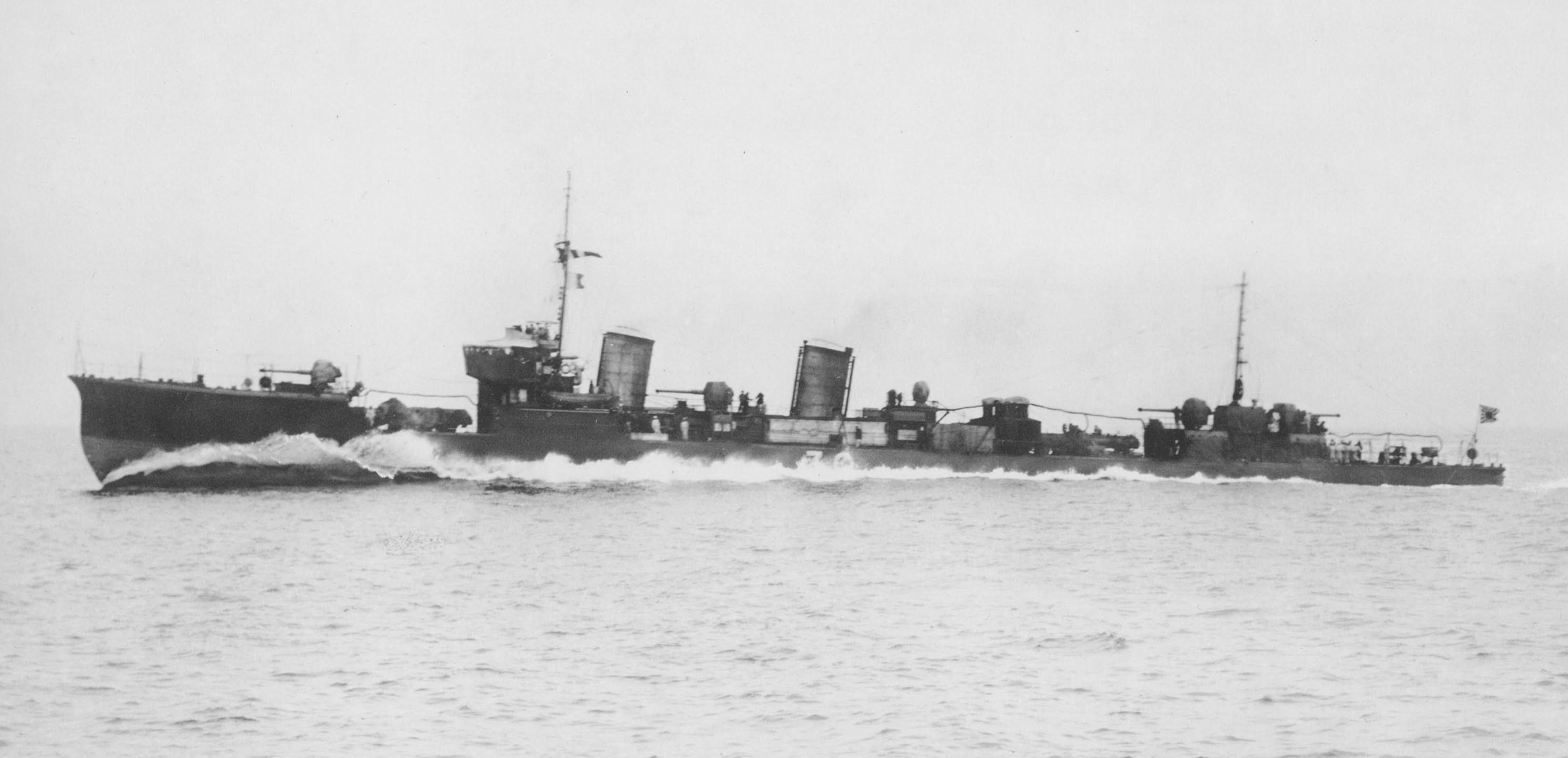
- Nagatsuki in April 1927

History

Empire of Japan
- Name: Nagatsuki
- Namesake: September
- Builder: Ishikawajima Shipyards, Tokyo
- Laid down: 16 April 1926 as Destroyer No. 30
- Launched: 6 October 1926
- Completed: 30 April 1927
- Renamed: As Nagatsuki 1 August 1928
- Stricken: 1 October 1943
- Fate: Beached and destroyed 6 July 1943

General characteristics
- Class & type: Mutsuki-class destroyer
- Displacement: 1,336 t (1,315 long tons) (normal); 1,800 t (1,772 long tons) (deep load)
- Length: 97.54 m (320 ft 0 in) (pp); 102.4 m (335 ft 11 in) (o/a)
- Beam: 9.16 m (30 ft 1 in)
- Draft: 2.96 m (9 ft 9 in)
- Installed power: 38,500 shp (28,700 kW); 4 × Kampon water-tube boilers
- Propulsion: 2 shafts; 2 × Kampon geared steam turbines
- Speed: 37.25 knots (68.99 km/h; 42.87 mph)
- Range: 4,000 nmi (7,400 km; 4,600 mi) at 15 knots (28 km/h; 17 mph)
- Complement: 150
- Armament: 4 × 12 cm (4.7 in) Type 3 guns; 2 × triple 61 cm (24 in) torpedo tubes; 18 × depth charges; 16 × mines

Service record
- Part of: Destroyer Division 22
- Operations: Battle of the Philippines; Solomon Islands campaign

Nagatsuki (長月, "September") was one of twelve Mutsuki-class destroyers, built for the Imperial Japanese Navy (IJN) during the 1920s. During the Pacific War, she participated in the Philippines Campaign in December 1941 and the Dutch East Indies Campaign in early 1942. In March, she was assigned to convoy escort duties in and around Malaysia and the Dutch East Indies until she was transferred to Rabaul in early 1943 to ferry troops around New Guinea and the Solomon Islands.

== Design and description ==
The Mutsuki class was an improved version of the Kamikaze-class destroyers and was the first with triple 61-centimeter (24 in) torpedo tubes. The ships had an overall length of 102.4 meters (335 ft 11 in) and were 94.54 meters (310 ft 2 in) between perpendiculars. They had a beam of 9.16 meters (30 ft 1 in), and a mean draft of 2.96 meters (9 ft 9 in). The Mutsuki-class ships displaced 1,336 metric tons (1,315 long tons) at standard load and 1,800 metric tons (1,772 long tons) at deep load. They were powered by two Parsons geared steam turbines, each driving one propeller shaft, using steam provided by four Kampon water-tube boilers. The turbines were designed to produce 38,500 shaft horsepower (28,700 kW), which would propel the ships at 37.25 knots (68.99 km/h; 42.87 mph). The ships carried 420 metric tons (413 long tons) of fuel oil which gave them a range of 4,000 nautical miles (7,400 km; 4,600 mi) at 15 knots (28 km/h; 17 mph). Their crew consisted of 150 officers and crewmen.

The main armament of the Mutsuki-class ships consisted of four 12-centimeter (4.7 in) Type 3 guns in single mounts; one gun forward of the superstructure, one between the two funnels and the last pair back to back atop the aft superstructure. The guns were numbered '1' to '4' from front to rear. The ships carried two above-water triple sets of 61-centimeter torpedo tubes; one mount was between the forward superstructure and the forward gun and the other was between the aft funnel and aft superstructure. Four reload torpedoes were provided for the tubes. They carried 18 depth charges and could also carry 16 mines. They could also fitted with minesweeping gear.

Nagatsuki was one of six Mutsuki-class ships reconstructed in 1935–36, with their hulls strengthened, raked caps fitted to the funnels and shields to the torpedo mounts. In 1941–42, most of those ships were converted into fast transports with No. 2 and No. 3 guns removed. In addition, ten license-built 25 mm (1.0 in) Type 96 light AA guns and at least two 13.2 mm (0.5 in) Type 93 anti-aircraft machineguns were installed. The minesweeping gear was replaced by four depth charge throwers and the ships now carried a total of 36 depth charges. These changes reduced their speed to 34 knots (63 km/h; 39 mph) and increased their displacement to 1,944 metric tons (1,913 long tons) at normal load. Three more 25 mm guns were added in 1942–43.

== Construction and career ==
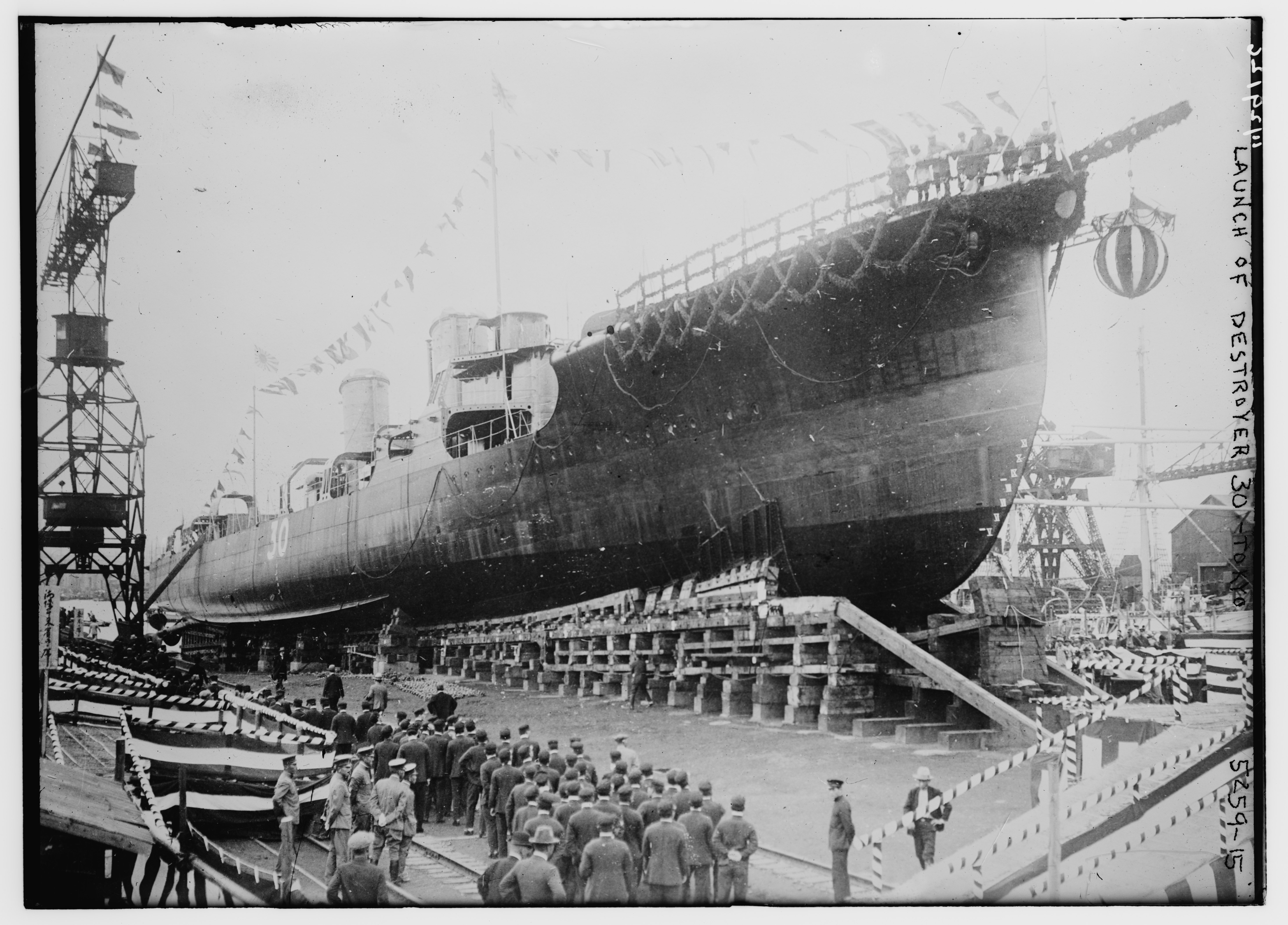
Launching of Nagatsuki (then known as Destroyer No. 30) on 6 October 1926 at Ishikawajima Shipyard, Tokyo, Japan.

Nagatsuki, built at the Ishikawajima Shipyards in Tokyo, was laid down on 16 April 1925, launched on 6 October 1926 and commissioned on 30 April 1927. Originally commissioned simply as Destroyer No. 30, the ship was assigned the name Nagatsuki on 30 April 1927. In the late 1930s, the ship participated in combat during the Second Sino-Japanese War, covering the landings of Japanese troops in central and southern China, and the Invasion of French Indochina.

=== Pacific War ===
At the time of the attack on Pearl Harbor on 7 December 1941, Nagatsuki was assigned to Destroyer Division 22 under Destroyer Squadron 5 of the 3rd Fleet. She sortied from the Mako Guard District in the Pescadores as part of the Japanese invasion force for Operation M (the invasion of the Philippines), during which time the destroyer helped screen landings of Japanese forces at Lingayen Gulf and at Aparri. While at Lingayen Gulf, Nagatsuki suffered light damage due to strafing attacks by USAAF aircraft, which left one crewman dead and five injured.

In early 1942, Nagatsuki was assigned to escorting troop convoys from French Indochina for Operation J (the invasion of Java, Netherlands East Indies), From 10 March 1942 Nagatsuki and Destroyer Division 5 were reassigned to the Southwest Area Fleet and escorted troop convoy from Singapore to Penang, and Rangoon. The destroyer returned to Sasebo Naval Arsenal for repairs on 19 September, and rejoined the fleet on 9 November, continuing escort patrol duties.

At the end of January 1943, Nagatsuki escorted the seaplane tender Kamikawa Maru from Sasebo via Truk and Rabaul to Shortlands, and remained throughout February to cover Operation KE (troop evacuations from Guadalcanal) and to escort convoys to Palau, Wewak and Rabaul. On 25 February, Nagatsuki was reassigned to the IJN 8th Fleet. The ship participated in several Tokyo Express troop transport missions throughout the Solomon Islands through the end of June, especially to Kolombangara and Tuluvu. On 4–5 July, while on a run to Kolombangara, Nagatsuki engaged the US destroyer USS Strong, which she helped sink with her torpedoes.

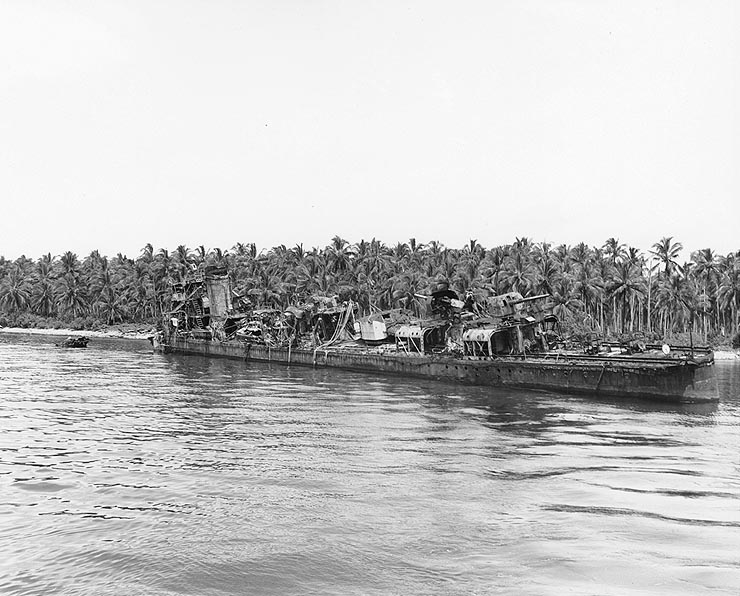
The destroyed hulk of Nagatsuki on Kolombangara, photographed on 8 May 1944

However, the following day, during the Battle of Kula Gulf, Nagatsuki was holed by a six-inch shot. The ship's captain, Lieutenant Commander Tameo Furukawa, grounded the vessel near Bambari Harbor 08°02′S 157°12′E on Kolombangara to land his troops; however, later, even with the assistance of sister ship Satsuki, it proved impossible to refloat the vessel, and she was attacked and destroyed the following day, 6 July, by Allied aircraft. The crew suffered eight dead and thirteen injured, but the survivors later reached the Imperial Japanese Army base at Vila on Kolombangara on foot. Nagatsuki was struck from the Navy List on 1 October 1943.
