= Battle of Kula Gulf =

Naval battle of the Pacific Theater of World War II

Coordinates: 7.9667°S 157.0667°E

- Part of the Pacific Theater of World War II
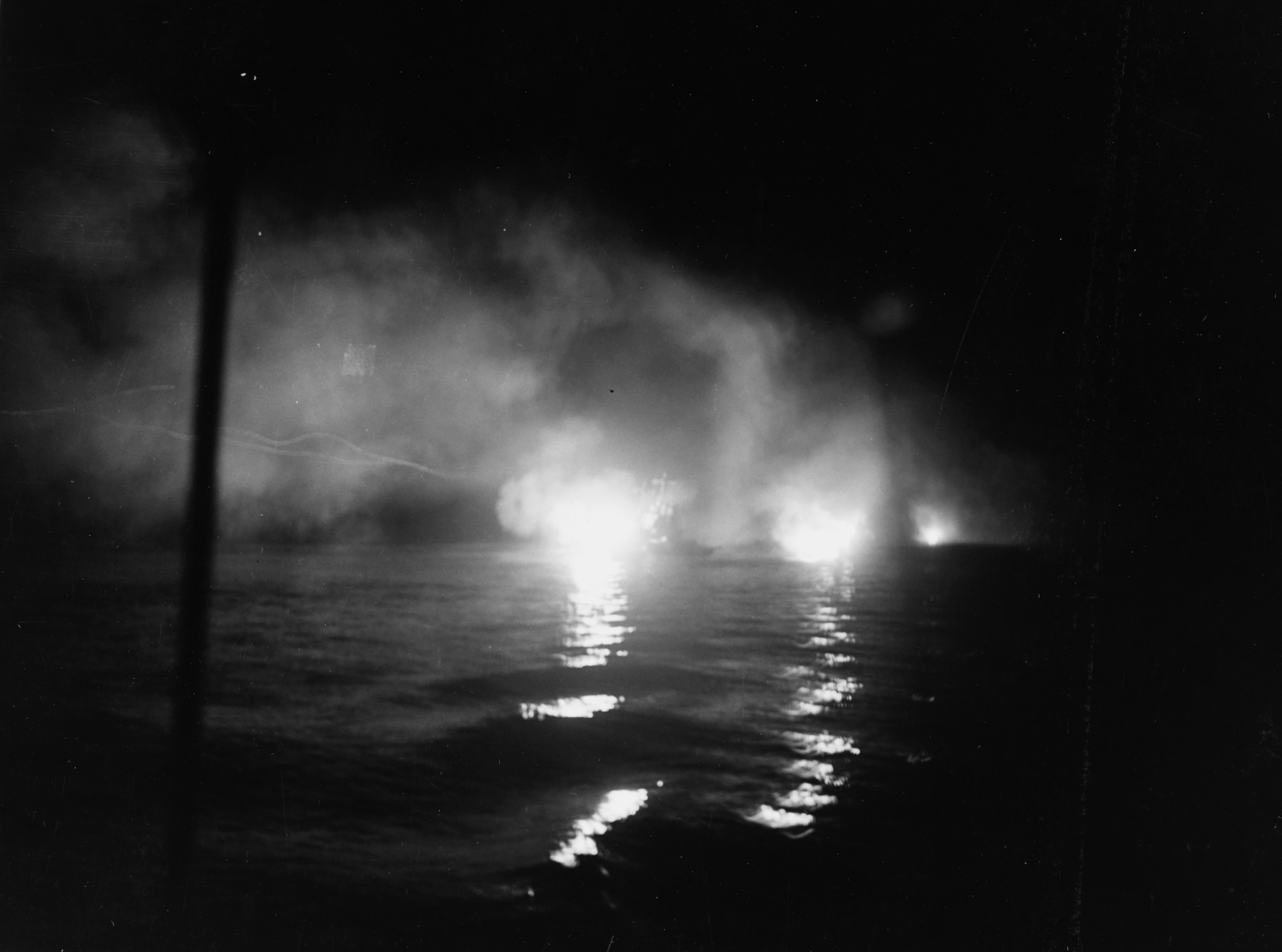
- USS Helena and St. Louis in action at Kula Gulf, seen from USS Honolulu
Date	6 July 1943
Location	Kolombangara, Solomon Islands
Result	Inconclusive

Belligerents
United States	Japan

Commanders and leaders
(United States) Walden L. Ainsworth (United States) Robert W. Hayler	(Empire of Japan) Teruo Akiyama †

Units involved
(United States) Task Group 36.1	(Empire of Japan) 3rd Destroyer Squadron

Strength
3 light cruisers, 4 destroyers	10 destroyers

Casualties and losses
1 light cruiser sunk, 168 killed	2 destroyers sunk, 2 destroyers damaged 324 killed

The Battle of Kula Gulf (Japanese: クラ湾夜戦) took place in the early hours of 6 July 1943 during World War II. The battle involved United States and Japanese ships off the eastern coast of Kolombangara in the Solomon Islands. It took place during the early stages of the New Georgia campaign when a Japanese force landing reinforcements at Vila was intercepted by a force of US Navy cruisers and destroyers. One US light cruiser was sunk during the engagement while two Japanese destroyers were sunk and two more were damaged. The Japanese withdrew after the engagement, having landed 1,600 troops.

== Background ==
In mid-1943, in the wake of the Guadalcanal campaign, the Allies launched their next offensive in the Solomon Islands, landing troops on the island of Rendova on 30 June as a preliminary step to seizing the major Japanese airstrip at Munda on New Georgia. The US landings on Rendova took place to set up an initial beachhead from which to move troops across Blanche Channel to New Georgia. After Rendova had been secured, the move to Zanana on the mainland took place on 2 July, after which US forces began the westward advance on Munda. In order to support this effort and to cut off Japanese reinforcements from moving down the Munda trail from Bairoko, the Allies decided to land a force on the north shore of New Georgia on 5 July. Meanwhile, the Japanese sought to reinforce the Munda area, moving troops and supplies via barge from the Shortlands, via Kolombangara.

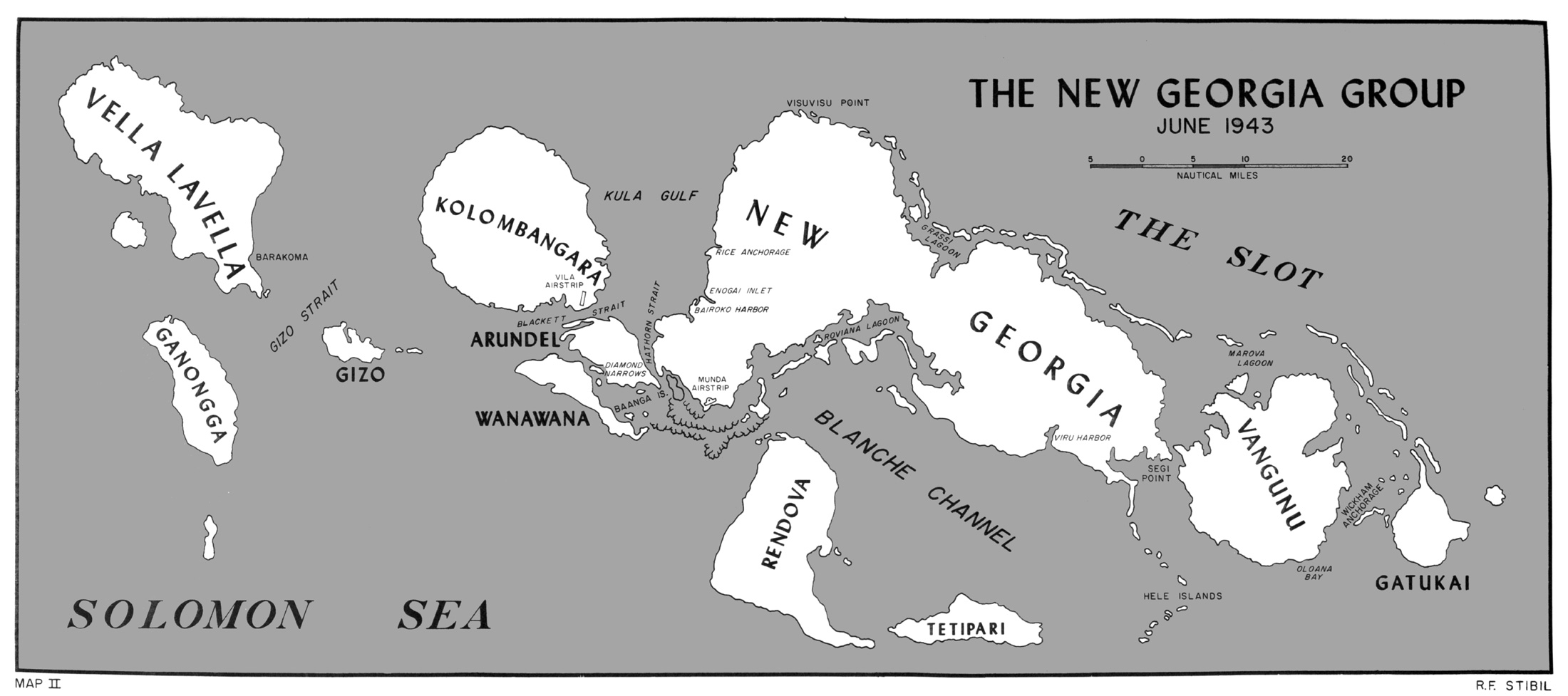
The New Georgia group of islands. The Kula Gulf lies between Kolombangara and northwestern New Georgia

The night before the battle in the Kula Gulf, Rear Admiral Walden L. Ainsworth's Task Group 36.1 (TG 36.1) conducted a cruiser bombardment of Vila on Kolombangara Island and Bairoko. This operation was undertaken to support a landing at Rice Anchorage on the northern shore of New Georgia, by U.S. Marine and U.S. Army troops tasked with capturing Enogai and Bairoko.

At the same time as the Marines were landing at Rice Anchorage, two U.S. Navy destroyers, USS Strong and Chevalier, entered Bairoko Harbor to provide naval gunfire support. In the early hours of the morning a Type 93 torpedo hit Strong on her port side aft, resulting in the loss of the destroyer. A total of 241 survivors were rescued by Chevalier while O'Bannon attempted to return fire; 46 U.S. sailors lost their lives during the attack. The torpedo came from a salvo of 14 torpedoes fired by a group of four Japanese destroyers, led by Niizuki, traveled a distance of 11 nautical miles (20 km), and is believed to be the longest successful torpedo attack of the war. After firing their torpedoes the Japanese destroyers departed the area without being detected. Such was the distance of the shot, the U.S. commander believed that his force had been attacked by a Japanese submarine.

== Battle ==
Ainsworth's task group consisted of the light cruisers USS Honolulu (CL-48), USS St. Louis (CL-49), and USS Helena (CL-50), plus four destroyers, Nicholas, O'Bannon, Radford and Jenkins. On the afternoon of 5 July, they were returning to the Coral Sea to resupply when Admiral William Halsey was informed of another "Tokyo Express" mission down "the Slot" in the Solomon Islands, from Buin, on Bougainville. Ordered to intercept the Japanese, Ainsworth changed course, and proceeded northwest past New Georgia Island. Chevalier had been damaged picking up survivors from Strong, and left the area; they were replaced by Radford and Jenkins, who left Tulagi at 16:47 hours and 18:37 hours on 5 July respectively, after replenishing.

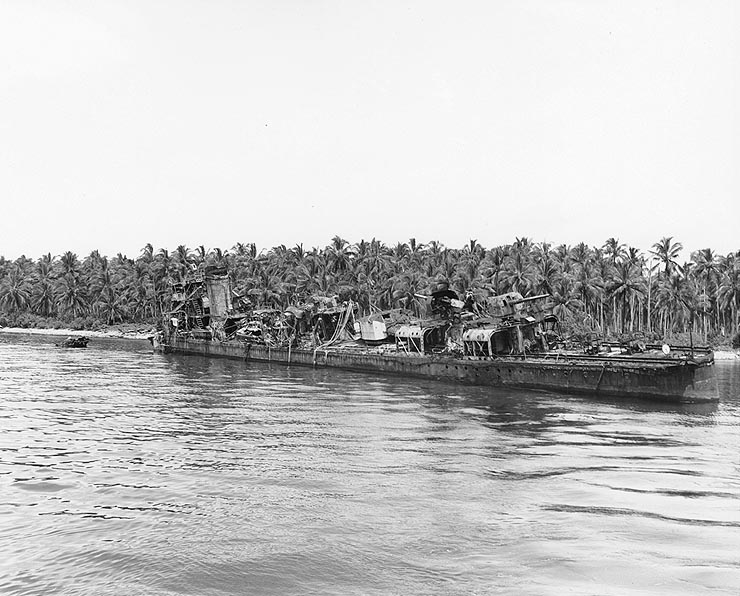
Nagatsuki abandoned, May 1944

The American ships passed Visu Visu Point, on the northwest coast of New Georgia, just after midnight on 6 July. About an hour later, Ainsworth's task force was off the east coast of Kolombangara, about half a mile from Visu Visu Point, and roughly northeast of Waugh Rock, when they came into contact with a Japanese naval reinforcement group consisting of two transport units carrying troops, escorted by a support unit, under Admiral Teruo Akiyama. The Japanese force consisted of ten ships in total, all of which were destroyers. The support unit was made up of three ships from the 3rd Destroyer Squadron, while the first transport unit (designated the 30th Transport Division) was made up of three destroyers, and the second transport unit (designated the 11th Transport Division) consisted of four destroyers.

The Japanese ships were carrying 2,600 ground troops and were bound for Vila, which was being used as a staging point for moving reinforcements to Munda. When the battle began, Akiyama's force was divided into two parts: the three escorts of the support unit (Niizuki, Suzukaze and Tanikaze) trailing the main column consisting of the four ships from the second transport unit (Amagiri, Hatsuyuki, Nagatsuki and Satsuki). Meanwhile, the three ships of the first transport unit, Mochizuki, Mikazuki and Hamakaze, were unloading at Vila, about 8.5 nautical miles (15.7 km; 9.8 mi) away.

The escorts of the Japanese support unit were the first to be engaged. The U.S. ships, having tracked their opponents with radar, opened fire at 01:57 hours, firing 612 shells in 21 minutes and six seconds, quickly sinking the destroyer Niizuki and killing Admiral Akiyama. However, Helena had expended all of her flashless powder the previous night, and she was forced to use smokeless powder, thus illuminating herself to the Japanese ships with every salvo. Two of the Japanese destroyers launched their Long Lance torpedoes and hit Helena, fatally damaging her. After heading away from Vila following first contact, the main Japanese force broke away behind a smokescreen. In the process, Nagatsuki was hit by a single 6-inch shell, and ran aground near Bambari Harbor, on Kolombangara, 5 miles (8.0 km) north of Vila, while Hatsuyuki was damaged slightly by two shells, which failed to explode.

Around 03:30 hours, Ainsworth began retiring towards Tulagi, while the Japanese headed for Buin. Two American destroyers, Radford and O'Bannon, remained behind to rescue survivors, as did the Japanese destroyer, Amagiri. At about 05:00, Amagiri and Nicholas exchanged torpedoes and gunfire; hit four times, Amagiri withdrew. The beached Nagatsuki was abandoned by her crew in the morning, and was later bombed and destroyed by American aircraft. Mikazuki and Hamakaze completed unloading, and departed through the Blackett Strait, while Mochizuki lingered for another hour before leaving through the Kula Gulf along the coast of Kolombangara, clashing briefly with Nicholas, around 06:15 before withdrawing behind a smoke screen.

== Aftermath ==
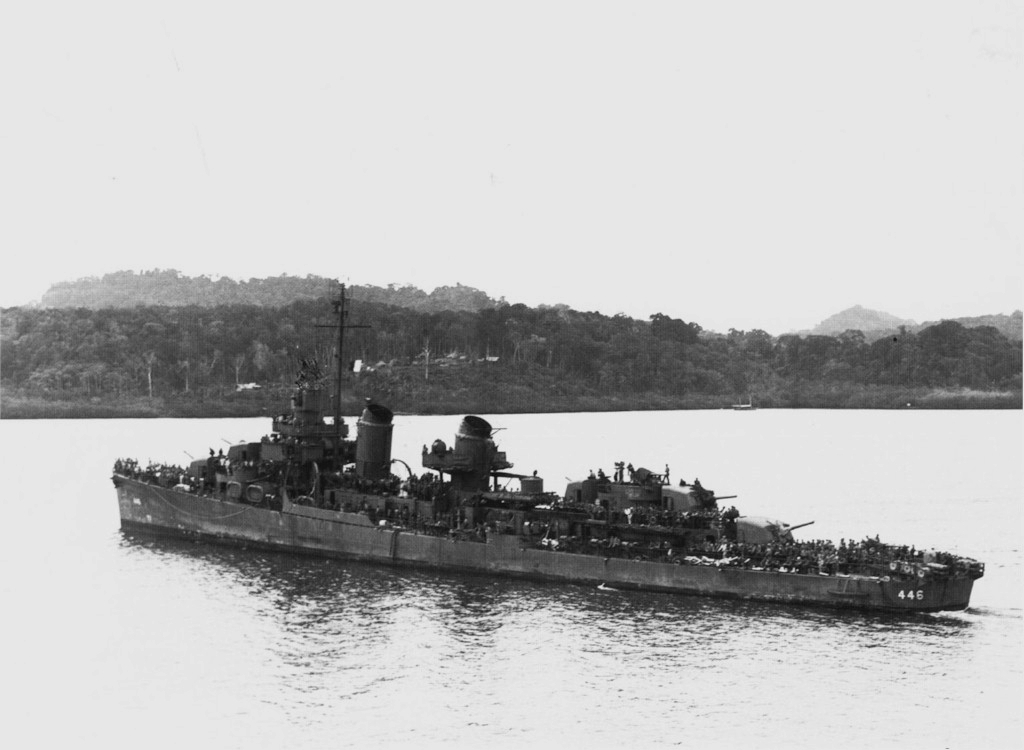
Radford arriving at Tulagi with survivors from Helena

US losses during the battle amounted to one light cruiser sunk and 168 killed, all of whom were from Helena, while the Japanese lost two destroyers sunk and two destroyers damaged, with 324 men killed. The breakdown of casualties for the Japanese by ship was as follows: Niizuki (300 killed), Amagiri (10 killed), Nagatsuki (eight killed and 13 wounded), and Hatsuyuki (six killed). The Japanese succeeded in landing 1,600 troops at Vila, as well as 90 tons of supplies. For his actions leading the column of cruisers at Kula Gulf and earlier in the campaign, Captain Robert W. Hayler of the Honolulu received his second Navy Cross.

The destroyers Radford and Nicholas returned to rescue survivors from Helena. While rescuing over 750 men, Radford and Nicholas had to reengage the Japanese three times; they were awarded the Presidential Unit Citation for their rescue. Amagiri escaped and later rammed and cut in half the motor torpedo boat PT-109, captained by future President of the United States John F. Kennedy (1917–1963), in the Blackett Strait, southwest of Kolombangara on 2 August. Hatsuyuki and Satsuki returned to Buin via the Blackett Strait.

Following the engagement in the Kula Gulf, the Japanese continued to move reinforcements south to New Georgia. On 9 July, 1,200 troops were moved to Kolombangara successfully without opposition. Another effort on 12/13 July, however, resulted in the Battle of Kolombangara. Meanwhile, ashore, US troops had secured Enogai on the northwestern coast on 10–11 July, while around Munda the Japanese stubbornly resisted US efforts to advance towards the airfield, which stalled and was eventually halted by a Japanese counterattack on 17 July.

== Namesake ==
The U.S. Navy escort aircraft carrier USS Kula Gulf—in commission from 1945–1946, 1951–1955, and 1965–1969—was named for this battle.
