= CRI Vila and Santo =

CRI Vila and Santo at 102 FM is a radio station in Vila, Solomon Islands and Santo, Vanuatu. It is part of China Radio International. The station broadcasts primarily in English.
