= USS Jenkins (DD-447) =

Fletcher-class destroyer

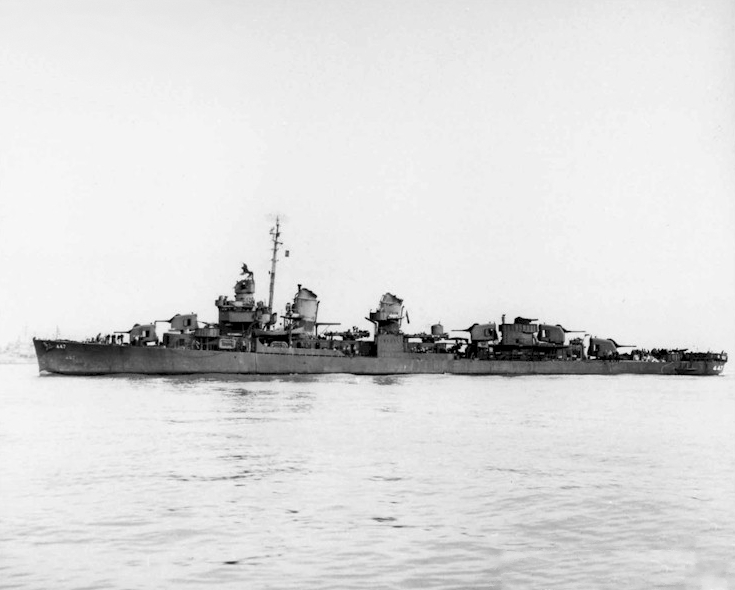
- USS Jenkins (DD-447) off Mare Island on 15 Jan 1944

History

United States
- Name: Jenkins
- Namesake: Rear Admiral Thornton A. Jenkins
- Builder: Federal Shipbuilding and Drydock Company
- Laid down: 27 November 1941
- Launched: 21 June 1942
- Commissioned: 31 July 1942
- Decommissioned: 1 May 1946
- Reclassified: DDE-447, 2 January 1951
- Recommissioned: 2 November 1951
- Decommissioned: February 1969
- Stricken: 2 July 1969
- Fate: Sold for scrap, 17 February 1971

General characteristics
- Class & type: Fletcher-class destroyer
- Displacement: 2,100 tons
- Length: 376 ft 4 in (114.71 m)
- Beam: 39 ft 5 in (12.01 m)
- Draft: 13 ft (4.0 m)
- Propulsion: 60,000 shp (45,000 kW); geared turbines; 2 propellers
- Speed: 36 kn (67 km/h; 41 mph)
- Range: 6,500 nmi (12,000 km; 7,500 mi) at 15 kn (28 km/h; 17 mph)
- Complement: 273 officers and enlisted
- Armament: 5 × single Mk 12 5 in (127 mm)/38 guns; 5 × twin 40 mm (1.6 in) Bofors AA guns; 7 × single 20 mm (0.8 in) Oerlikon AA guns; 2 × quintuple 21 in (533 mm) torpedo tubes; 6 × single depth charge throwers; 2 × depth charge racks

USS Jenkins (DD-447) was a Fletcher-class destroyer in the service of the United States Navy, the second ship named after Rear Admiral Thornton A. Jenkins. Beginning service during World War II, the destroyer saw action in the Pacific theatre. Jenkins was placed in reserve following the end of the war, until 1951, when the ship was reactivated for the Korean War. She served in the western Pacific until 1969 when the destroyer was taken out of service and sold for scrap in 1971.

== Construction and career ==
Jenkins was laid down by Federal Shipbuilding & Drydock Co., Kearny, New Jersey on 27 November 1941 and launched on 21 June 1942; sponsored by Mrs Marion Parker Embry. The destroyer was commissioned on 31 July 1942.

After a training period during the summer of 1942, Jenkins sailed from Casco Bay, Maine on 24 October as an escort to a convoy headed for the North African campaign. She screened capital ships during naval gunfire support missions, as the attack force arrived off Casablanca on 8 November. Following the Naval Battle of Casablanca, the destroyer returned to New York on 19 November to prepare for action in the Pacific.

Arriving at Nouméa, New Caledonia on 4 January 1943, she began escort and patrol duty among the Solomon Islands and in the Coral Sea. Her first Pacific landing operation began on 29 June, when she joined other units supporting the invasion of New Georgia Island.

Assigned to Rear Admiral Walden Lee "Pug" Ainsworth's Task Group 36.1, Jenkins departed Tulagi on 5 July and steamed up The Slot to intercept Japanese destroyer and transport force-carrying reinforcements to Kolombangara. Radar detected the enemy ships during mid-watch and during the Battle of Kula Gulf 6 July, gunfire sank one destroyer and drove another Ship grounding. Japanese Type 93 torpedo sank the cruiser USS Helena.

Following this operation, Jenkins was dispatched on 18 July to a position 100 miles (160 km) south of the Santa Cruz Islands to assist damaged seaplane tender Chincoteague and escorted Chincoteague back to Espiritu Santo.

During the next four months Jenkins engaged in escort duty, training exercises and preparations for the Gilbert Islands campaign. She joined the screen of Rear Admiral Arthur W. Radford's Northern Carrier Group which provided air support over Makin and Tarawa during the landings 15 November. The destroyer then sailed with the carrier force to attack Kwajalein and Wotje in the Marshalls on 4 December. During these raids the aircraft carrier USS Lexington was hit by a torpedo, and Jenkins was assigned to escort her back to Pearl Harbor arriving 9 December.

Jenkins departed Hawaii 25 January 1944 with a tanker unit to fuel fast carriers and ships covering the Marshall Islands campaign. She operated with the refuelling group through February, and conducted shore bombardment on Bougainville during March. She departed Seeadler Harbor 20 April to rendezvous with Task Force 77 for amphibious operations at Hollandia and Aitape. The landings took place on 22 April and their successful conclusion gave Allied Pacific forces another base from which to launch attacks on remaining enemy-held islands. After escort duty and anti-submarine patrols, Jenkins patrolled in early June to deny any attempt by the Japanese to reinforce the Biak garrison. She then covered and provided gunfire support for the invasions of Noemfoor, Sansapor, and Morotai, as well as patrolling and escorting reinforcements throughout the summer.

Jenkins departed Manus, Admiralties, 12 October for the Leyte invasion scheduled 20 October. Upon arrival, she was assigned to radar picket and fighter director duties until 27 November.

On 28 December Jenkins sortied from Aitape to provide cover for the Luzon Attack Force. After receiving minor damage from an enemy shore battery, the destroyer returned to Leyte 12 January 1945. Ten days later she departed to assist operations in the Lingayen Gulf area. She provided anti-submarine, minesweeping and shore bombardment on Corregidor from 13 February till late April.

She departed Subic Bay 24 April to cover minesweeping and amphibious operations in the Celebes Sea off Borneo. Jenkins struck a mine off Tarakan Island on 30 April and sailed into Subic Bay for repairs. On 18 June she sailed for the United States to complete repairs, arriving at San Pedro, California 8 July. She remained on the West Coast through the duration of the war. The destroyer decommissioned at San Diego on 1 May 1946.

The outbreak of the Korean War Jenkins was recommissioned as DDE-447 on 2 November 1951 . She departed San Diego on 25 February 1952 for a training period at Pearl Harbor. Upon completion of training, she arrived at Japan on 12 June; and during the summer she operated with Task Force 77 which provided air support for ground forces in Korea. She engaged in patrol duties off Korea and Taiwan before returning to Pearl Harbor on 5 December.

She operated out of Pearl until 10 November 1953 when she sailed for another Far Eastern tour, returning to Pearl Harbor on 15 June. From 1954 through 1963, Jenkins sailed annually to the Far East for peacekeeping operations with the 7th Fleet. In her 1958 deployment the 7th Fleet was on ready alert, as the Chinese Communists commenced harassment of the Chinese Nationalist islands of Quemoy and Matsu.

During the sixties, the 7th Fleet deployments were of greater importance because of the Communist insurgency in Laos and Vietnam. For the greater part of 1964 and 1965, Jenkins operated out of Pearl Harbor.

Jenkins sailed for the Far East 9 February 1966 and on 21 February was assigned to gunfire support duty and shelled enemy positions to assist Marines fighting in Vietnam, until returning to Pearl Harbor on 22 July.

Jenkins operated in Hawaiian waters until entering U.S. Naval Shipyard at Pearl Harbor on 11 September for a major overhaul which was completed early in 1967. The destroyer then prepared for another deployment in the war zone.

== Honors ==
Jenkins received 14 battle stars for World War II service and 1 star for Korean War service.
