= Walden L. Ainsworth =

United States admiral

Walden Lee Ainsworth
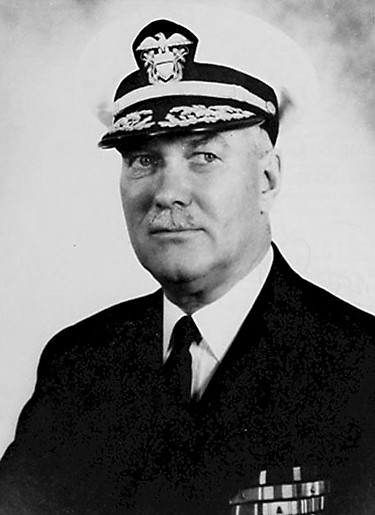
- Born: November 10, 1886; Minneapolis, Minnesota, U.S.
- Died: August 7, 1960 (aged 73); Washington, D.C., U.S.
- Military career
- Allegiance: United States of America
- Branch: United States Navy
- Service years: 1910–1948
- Rank: Vice Admiral
- Nickname: "Pug"
- Commands: Destroyer Squadron 2 USS Mississippi "Ainsworth Express"; 5th Naval District
- Conflicts: Occupation of Veracruz; World War I World War II: Battle of Kula Gulf; Battle of Guam
- Awards: Navy Cross; Distinguished Service Medal; Legion of Merit (2)

Walden Lee "Pug" Ainsworth (November 10, 1886 – August 7, 1960) was an admiral of the United States Navy. For his role in commanding destroyer and cruiser task forces in the Pacific during World War II, he was awarded the Navy Cross, the Navy Distinguished Service Medal, and the Legion of Merit.

== Early life and career ==
Ainsworth was born on November 10, 1886, in Minneapolis, Minnesota. He entered the United States Naval Academy on June 21, 1906, and graduated on June 3, 1910. Following successive two-year tours at sea in the battleship Iowa and in transport Prairie, he shifted to the battleship Florida during the spring of 1914, just in time to act as the adjutant of one of the battalions that landed at Veracruz, Mexico, on April 21. Upon the successful completion of that operation, he returned to Florida and served in her until sent to the transport DeKalb in May 1917. During the participation of the United States in World War I, he served in transports DeKalb and America. During the last months of the conflict, he found himself in the armored cruiser Frederick.

== Interwar assignments ==
In February 1919, the young officer went to Charleston, West Virginia, for two years as inspector of ordnance at the Navy's Armor and Projectile Plant before returning to sea as executive officer of the transport Hancock. Then, after a brief stint holding the same post in the light cruiser Birmingham, he commanded the destroyer Marcus for a year before becoming inspector of ordnance at Pittsburgh, Pennsylvania. In August 1924, orders sent him to the New York Navy Yard.

By the end of 1925, Ainsworth's growing stature in the field of ordnance won him the position of gunnery officer on the staff of the Commander, Destroyer Squadrons, Asiatic Fleet. In July 1927, he took command of the destroyer Paul Jones, but left the ship late in the summer of 1928 to begin three years at the Naval Academy as an instructor in the Department of Navigation.

At the end of the 1930–1931 academic year, Ainsworth returned to sea in the battleship Idaho to serve as that ship's navigator. Next came a tour in heavy cruiser Pensacola and one as communication officer for the 14th Naval District before he reported to the Naval War College at Newport, Rhode Island, for the senior course. In June 1936, Ainsworth became the executive officer of the battleship Mississippi and, two years later, he became Professor of Naval Science and Tactics at Tulane University in New Orleans, Louisiana.

== World War II ==
World War II in Europe was almost a year old when he took command of Destroyer Squadron 2 (DesRon 2) on July 22, 1940, and the United States had just entered that conflict when he returned to Mississippi as her commanding officer on December 19, 1941. Ainsworth promptly took that veteran battleship to the Pacific to strengthen the Navy's surface force in that ocean which had been seriously weakened by the Japanese surprise attack on Pearl Harbor.

On July 4, 1942, Ainsworth took administrative command of all Pacific Fleet destroyers (ComDesPac). On December 10 of that year, Admiral William F. Halsey gave him the additional duty of commanding Task Force 67 (TF 67) which had been badly mauled in the recent Battle of Tassafaronga; and, under his leadership that cruiser-destroyer force was soon winning renown as the "Ainsworth Express" for its fierce fighting in support of the final American drive to push Japanese troops off Guadalcanal. Its bombardment of the new Japanese air base at Munda on the island of New Georgia would be, in the words of naval historian, Samuel Eliot Morison, "... long regarded as a model...."

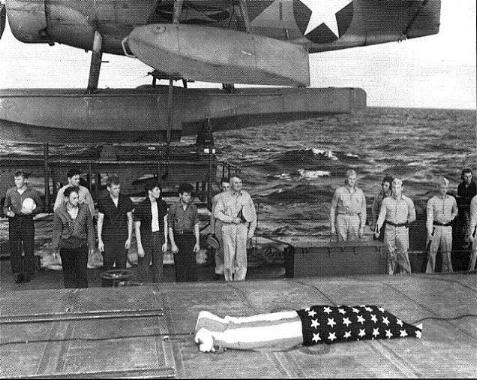
USS Helena survivors after their ship was sunk on July 6, 1943 hold a funeral service for Irwin Edwards aboard USS Honolulu. Edwards died of his wounds after being rescued. Admiral Walden Ainsworth, cap off center, provided comments.

Transferred to command of TF 18 and Cruiser Division 9 (CruDiv 9), Ainsworth continued his success during a prolonged series of runs up the long, narrow body of water between the central Solomon Islands which American bluejackets had nicknamed "the Slot". These operations parried the thrusts by Japanese warships challenging Allied control of the area. At the end of June, the tempo of American fighting in the southwestern Pacific picked up since the Navy had finally managed to assemble enough amphibious shipping in that theatre to resume the offensive. On the night of July 4–5, TF 18 moved up "the Slot" and bombarded Japanese positions at Vila on Kolombangara and at Baiko on New Georgia. The next afternoon, while Ainsworth's force was retiring from this action, word reached him that a large Japanese force was heading toward "the Slot". In an effort to meet and check this new threat, his warships again reversed course and headed toward the enemy. Ainsworth's "... outstanding leadership, brilliant tactics and courageous conduct ..." in the ensuing battle of Kula Gulf won him a Navy Cross. He also received the Distinguished Service Medal for his overall performance in the Southwest Pacific.

About a year later, Ainsworth won the Legion of Merit Medal by his "... exceptionally meritorious conduct ..." while commanding the fire support group during operations which recaptured Guam. Finally, he received a gold star in lieu of a second Legion of Merit for his display of "... exceptional ability and aggressiveness in handling the organization and administration of the cruisers, destroyers, destroyer escorts, and patrol frigates of the Pacific Fleet."

== Post-war life ==
After returning to the United States in the summer of 1945, Vice Admiral Ainsworth commanded the Fifth Naval District until retiring on December 1, 1948. He died in Washington, D.C., on August 7, 1960. Ainsworth was buried at Arlington National Cemetery on August 11, 1960.

== Personal life ==
He married Katharine Gardner (August 14, 1888 – September 30, 1973) on June 10, 1916. She was interred beside him at Arlington National Cemetery on October 4, 1973. Their daughter Katharine was married to U.S. Navy Vice Admiral Benedict J. Semmes Jr.

In 1924 he was elected as a hereditary member of the Massachusetts Society of the Cincinnati.

== Namesake ==
In 1972, the fast frigate USS Ainsworth (FF-1090) was named in his honor.
