= Japanese destroyer Satsuki (1925) =

Destroyer of the Imperial Japanese Navy

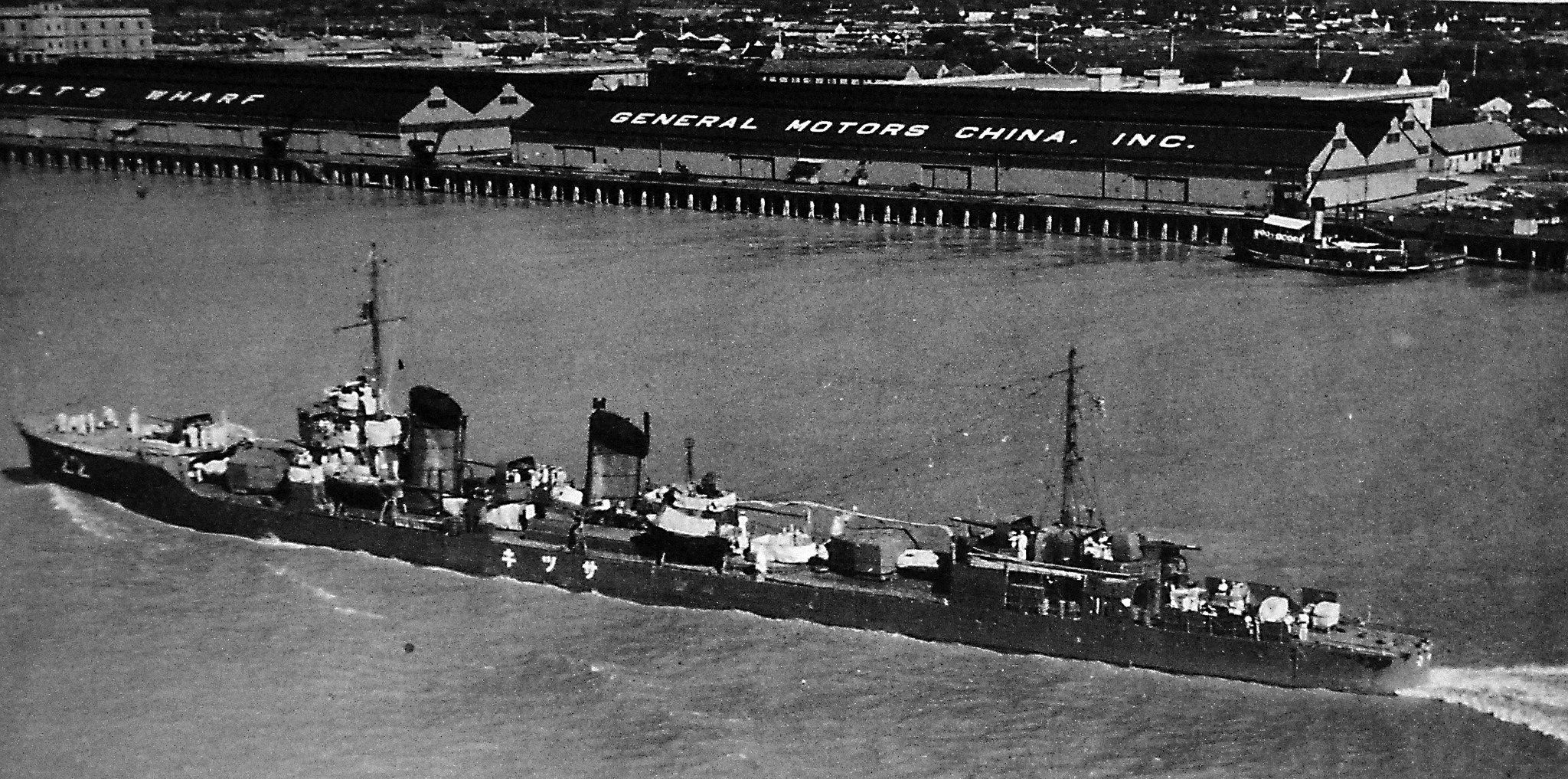
- Japanese destroyer Satsuki

History

Empire of Japan
- Name: Satsuki
- Namesake: Japanese destroyer Satsuki (1905)
- Builder: Fujinagata Shipyards, Japan
- Yard number: Destroyer No. 27
- Laid down: 1 December 1924
- Launched: 25 March 1925
- Commissioned: 15 November 1925
- Renamed: as Satsuki 1 August 1928
- Stricken: 10 November 1944
- Fate: Sunk in air attack 21 September 1944

General characteristics
- Class & type: Mutsuki-class destroyer
- Displacement: 1,315 long tons (1,336 t) normal, 1,445 long tons (1,468 t) full load
- Length: 97.54 m (320.0 ft) pp, 102.72 m (337.0 ft) overall
- Beam: 9.16 m (30.1 ft)
- Draught: 2.96 m (9.7 ft)
- Propulsion: 4 × Ro-Gō Kampon water-tube boilers; 2 × Kampon geared turbines; 38,500 ihp (28,700 kW); 2 shafts
- Speed: 37.25 knots (68.99 km/h)
- Range: 3,600 nautical miles (6,700 km) at 14 knots (26 km/h)
- Complement: 154
- Armament: 4 ×Type 3 120 mm 45 caliber naval gun, 2 × Type 92 7.7 mm machine gun, 2 × triple Type 12 torpedo tubes; 12 × 610 mm Type 8 torpedoes; 18 × depth charges; 16 × Ichi-Gō naval mines

Service record
- Part of: Destroyer Division 22
- Operations: Battle of the Philippines; Solomon Islands campaign; New Guinea campaign

Satsuki (皐月, "May") was one of twelve Mutsuki-class destroyers, built for the Imperial Japanese Navy following World War I. Advanced for their time, these ships served as first-line destroyers through the 1930s, but were considered obsolescent by the start of the Pacific War.

== History ==
Construction of the Mutsuki-class destroyers was authorized as part of the Imperial Japanese Navy's build up from fiscal 1923 of ships not covered by the Washington Naval Treaty. The class was a follow-on to the earlier Minekaze and Kamikaze-class destroyers, with which they shared many common design characteristics. Satsuki, built at the Fujinagata Shipyards in Osaka, was laid down on 1 December 1924, launched on 25 March 1925 and commissioned on 15 November 1925. Originally commissioned simply as Destroyer No. 27, it was assigned the name Satsuki on 1 August 1928.

=== World War II history ===
At the time of the attack on Pearl Harbor, Satsuki was part of Destroyer Division 22 under Destroyer Squadron 5 in the IJN 3rd Fleet, and deployed from Mako Guard District in the Pescadores as part of the Japanese invasion force for "Operation M" (the invasion of the Philippines), during which time it helped screen landings of Japanese forces at Lingayen Gulf and at Aparri.

In early 1942, Satsuki was assigned to escorting troop convoys from French Indochina for "Operation E" (the invasion of Malaya) and "Operation J" (the invasion of Java, Netherlands East Indies), in February. From 10 March 1942 Satsuki was reassigned to the Southwest Area Fleet and escorted troop convoys from Singapore around the occupied Netherlands East Indies. She returned to Sasebo Naval Arsenal for repairs on 9 June, and rejoined the fleet on 24 June. After escorting the seaplane tender Kamikawa Maru from Sasebo via Truk and Rabaul to the Shortlands in January 1943, she remained in the Solomon Islands throughout February to cover Operation KE (troop evacuations from Guadalcanal), and to escort convoys from Palau to Wewak and Kolombangara. Satsuki was assigned to the IJN 8th Fleet on February 25, 1943.

Satsuki participated in several "Tokyo Express" troop transport missions throughout the Solomons through the end of May, suffering damage when grounded on a reef southeast of Bougainville on 24 May, forcing a return to Rabaul for repairs. In June and July, Satsuki resumed "Tokyo Express" transport missions to Tuluvu and Kolombangara, participating in the Battle of Kula Gulf (5–6 July) and Battle of Kolombangara (12 July) but suffering no damage. Satsuki was, however, damaged on 17 July when attacked at Shortlands in an air raid by Allied bombers, forcing a return to Kure Naval Arsenal via Rabaul, Truk, and Yokosuka. On 5 September, Satsuki departed Kure back for Rabaul, where it resumed "Tokyo Express" operations to Kolombangara, Gasmata, and Buka. Returning briefly to Japan in November, Satsuki returned to Rabaul in early December and continued to make transport runs through the end of the year.

On 4 January 1944 Satsuki was strafed during an air raid at Kavieng, New Ireland, with numerous casualties, including its captain, Lieutenant Commander Tadao Iino. On the ship's return to Japan for repairs, Satsuki diverted to Saipan to assist the torpedoed aircraft carrier Unyō. Repairs were completed at Sasebo Naval Arsenal by 15 March. After escorting several troop convoys from Tateyama, Chiba via Hahajima Ogasawara islands to Palau, Satsuki was reassigned to the Central Pacific Area Fleet. The destroyer continued to escort troop convoys from Tateyama to Saipan and Guam through the end of May. In July, Satsuki escorted convoys from Kure via Manila to Lingga, then patrolled from Singapore. On 20 August, Satsuki joined the Combined Fleet.

On 21 September, after escorting a convoy from Singapore via Miri and Brunei to Manila, Satsuki was attacked by aircraft of Task Force 38 in an air raid on Manila Bay14°35′N 120°45′E. Satsuki took three direct bomb hits, killing 52 crewmen and injuring 15 others.

Satsuki was struck from the navy list on 10 November 1944.
