= Vila, Solomon Islands =

Coordinates: 8.1251°S 157.1432°E

Vila is a site at the southern end of Kolombangara in the nation of Solomon Islands, originally the location of the Vila Stanmore coconut plantation.

During World War II, Japanese forces built an airstrip in order to stage aircraft from Rabaul down to Guadalcanal, and on several occasions, beginning on 24 January 1943 the US attempted to put the airstrip out of operation by bombing it. However, it remained in use until the Japanese evacuated Kolombangara in September and early October 1943.

The airstrip survives today, and is occasionally visited by tourists interested in its history.
