= Japanese destroyer Isokaze (1939) =

Kagerō-class destroyer

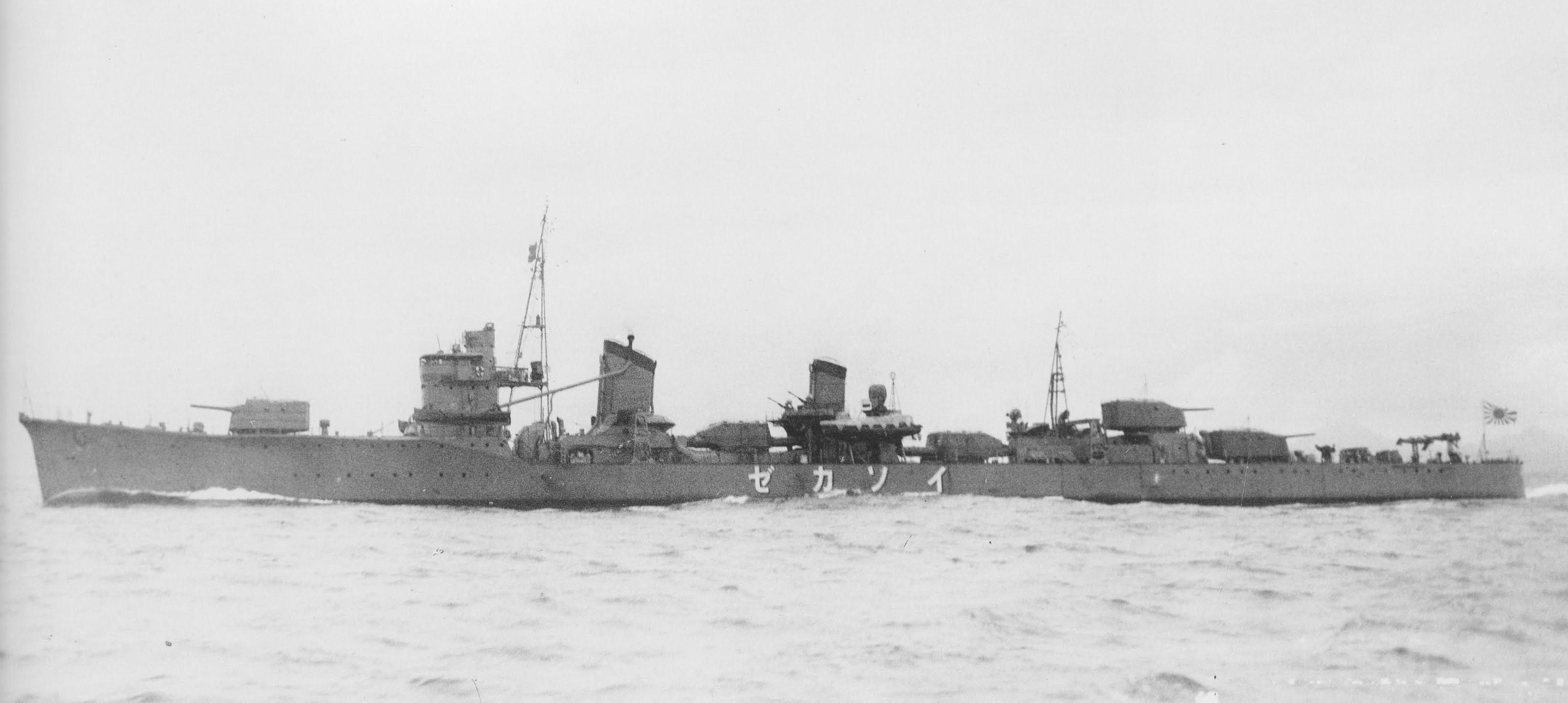
- Isokaze undergoing sea trials on 22 November 1940.

History

Empire of Japan
- Name: Isokaze
- Ordered: 1937
- Builder: Sasebo Naval Arsenal
- Laid down: 25 November 1938
- Launched: 19 June 1939
- Commissioned: 30 November 1940
- Stricken: 25 May 1945
- Fate: Scuttled, 7 April 1945

General characteristics
- Class & type: Kagerō-class destroyer
- Displacement: 2,490 long tons (2,530 t)
- Length: 118.5 m (388 ft 9 in)
- Beam: 10.8 m (35 ft 5 in)
- Draft: 3.8 m (12 ft 6 in)
- Speed: 35 knots (40 mph; 65 km/h)
- Complement: 239
- Armament: 6 × 127 mm (5.0 in)/50 caliber DP guns; up to 28 × Type 96 25 mm (0.98 in) AA guns; up to 4 × 13.2 mm (0.52 in) AA guns; 8 × 610 mm (24 in) torpedo tubes; 36 depth charges

Service record

Isokaze (磯風; "Wind on the Beach") was one of 19 Kagerō-class destroyers built for the Imperial Japanese Navy during the 1930s. Isokaze escorted the aircraft carriers that attacked Pearl Harbor, before remaining with the Kido Butai for the first months of the war; helping to sink the 8,806 ton Dutch freighter Modjokerto. From 4-6 June, Isokaze escorted aircraft carriers during the battle of Midway where she evacuated the sinking aircraft carrier Sōryū before scuttling her with torpedoes. Isokaze then took part in a series troop and supply transport missions and patrol and escorting duties for the Guadalcanal campaign.

On 10 January 1943, Isokaze helped to sink the submarine USS Argonaut - the largest submarine of the US navy - before being crippled by bomb hits later that February which took her out of action until July. Isokaze partook in several small skirmishes and engagements against US destroyers throughout the Solomon Islands campaign, and patrol and transport duties throughout the Marianas campaign before escorting aircraft carriers at the battle of the Philippine Sea from 19-20 June 1944. Later that October, Isokaze served in the battle of Leyte Gulf (and was the photography ship while the fleet was anchored under Burnei). During the largest naval battle in history, Isokaze survived many waves of carrier aircraft and helped to sink the destroyer USS Johnston.

Isokaze met her end on 7 April 1945 escorting the battleship Yamato during operation Ten-Go. While attempting to assist the crippled light cruiser Yahagi, Isokaze herself was destroyed by bomb near misses and scuttled.

== Design and description ==
The Kagerō class was an enlarged and improved version of the preceding Asashio class. Their crew numbered 240 officers and enlisted men. The ships measured 118.5 meters (388 ft 9 in) overall, with a beam of 10.8 meters (35 ft 5 in) and a draft of 3.76 meters (12 ft 4 in). They displaced 2,065 metric tons (2,032 long tons) at standard load and 2,529 metric tons (2,489 long tons) at deep load. The ships had two Kampon geared steam turbines, each driving one propeller shaft, using steam provided by three Kampon water-tube boilers. The turbines were rated at a total of 52,000 shaft horsepower (39,000 kW) for a designed speed of 35 knots (65 km/h; 40 mph). The ships had a range of 5,000 nautical miles (9,300 km; 5,800 mi) at a speed of 18 knots (33 km/h; 21 mph).

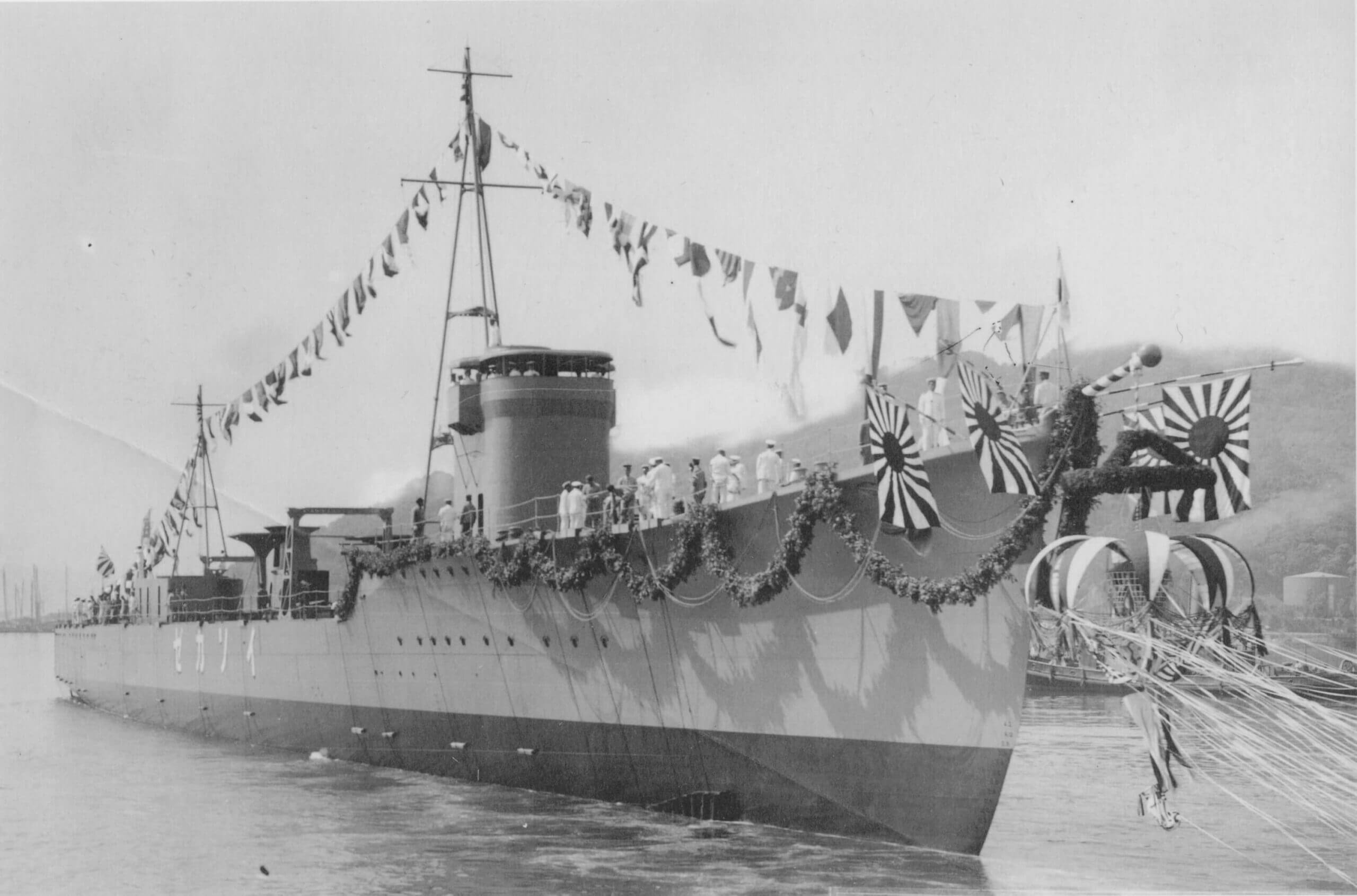
Isokaze's launching on 19 June 1939

The main armament of the Kagerō class consisted of six Type 3 127-millimeter (5.0 in) guns in three twin-gun turrets, one superfiring pair aft and one turret forward of the superstructure. They were built with four Type 96 25-millimeter (1.0 in) anti-aircraft guns in two twin-gun mounts, but more of these guns were added over the course of the war. The ships were also armed with eight 610-millimeter (24.0 in) torpedo tubes for the oxygen-fueled Type 93 "Long Lance" torpedo in two quadruple traversing mounts; one reload was carried for each tube. Their anti-submarine weapons comprised 16 depth charges.

== Career ==
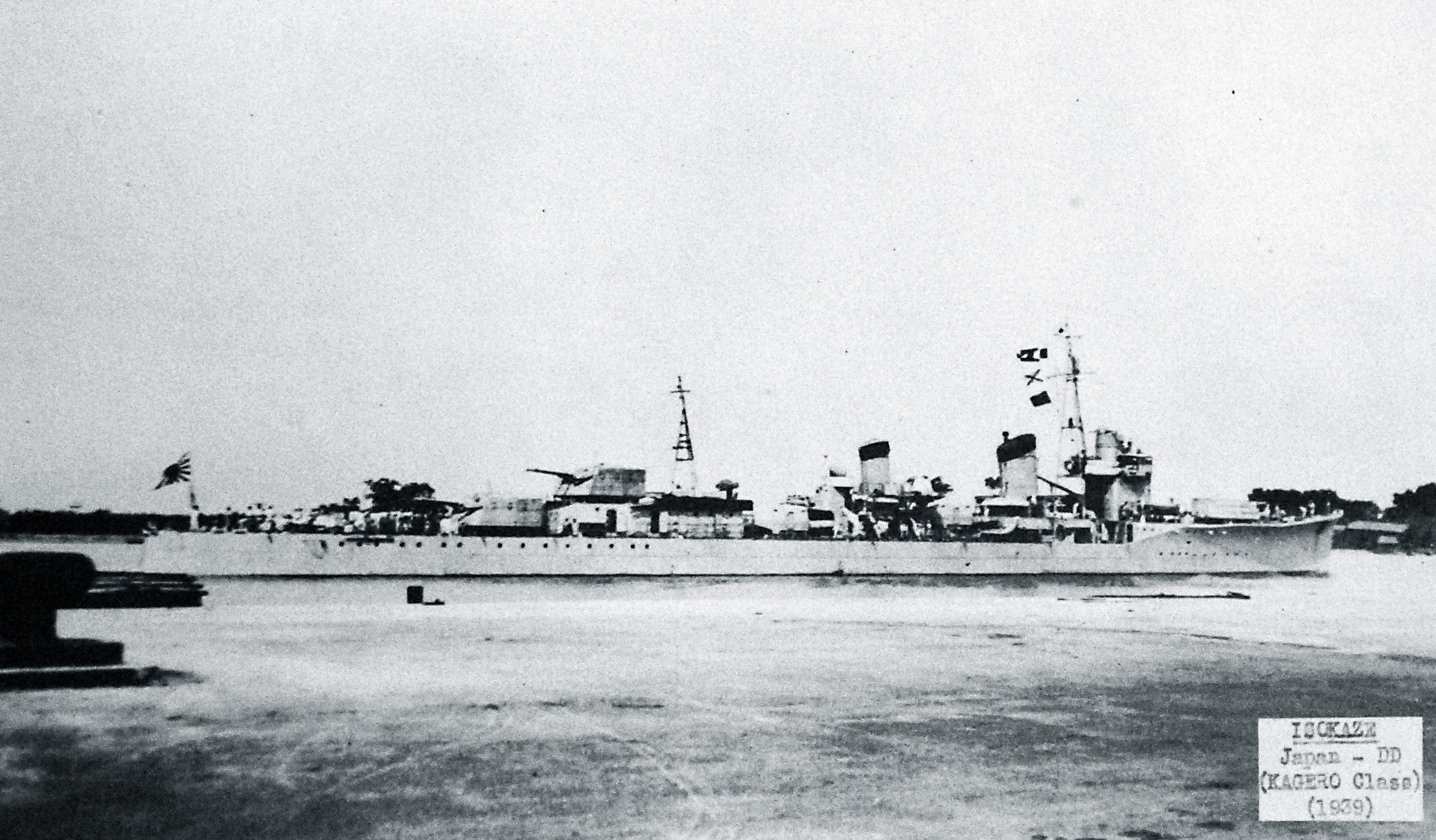
Isokaze anchored in Kure naval arsenal, 31 March 1941

Isokaze was constructed in the Sasebo Naval Arsenal, laid down on 25 November 1938, launched on 19 June 1939, and commissioned on 30 November 1940. Upon commissioning, Isokaze was designated to the 17th destroyer division alongside her sistership Urakaze (flagship of captain Sugiura Kajū) with the destroyers Tanikaze and Hamakaze becoming eventual additions. Throughout her peacetime career, Isokaze transitioned between various naval facilities, and went through many crew adjustments, being incorporated into the first air fleet on 1 May 1941, and then destroyer squadron 1 later on 18 July. On 16 October, Isokaze took part in training duties in the Bungo Channel in the led up to the Pacific War.

=== 1942 ===
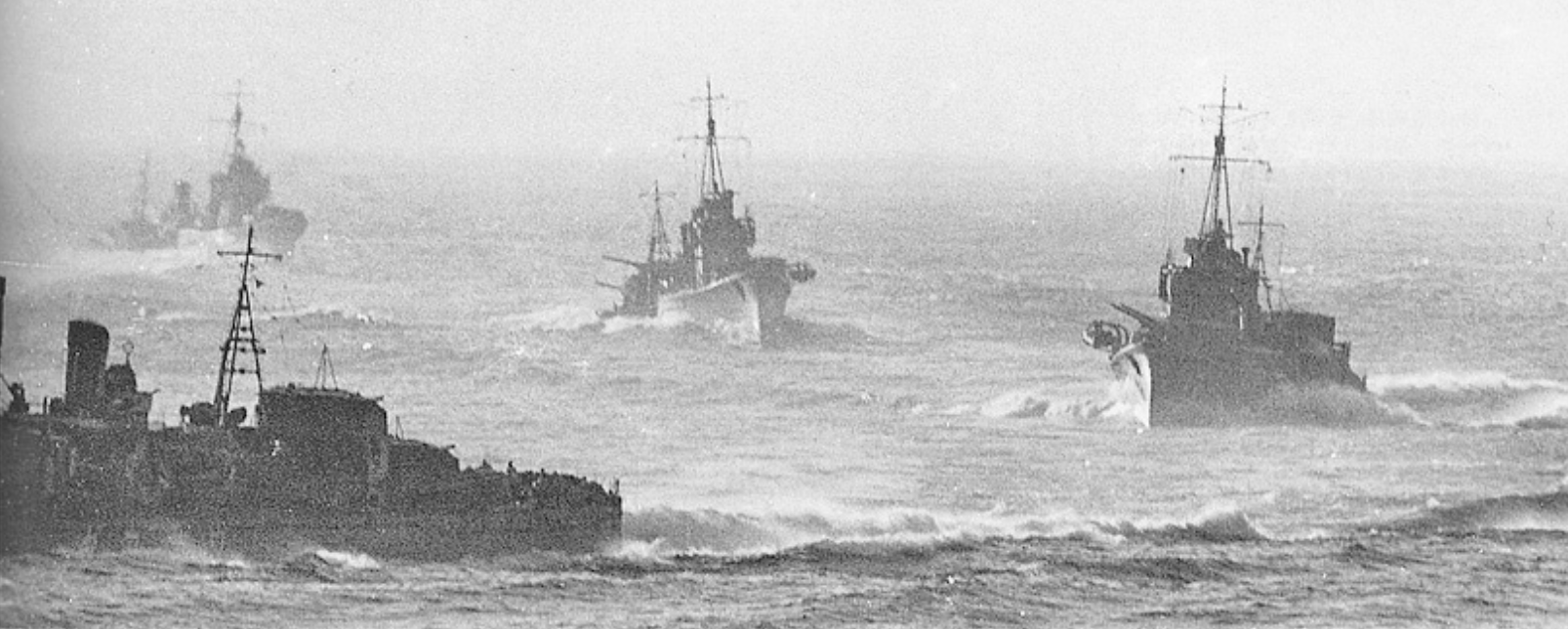
Urakaze leading Isokaze, Tanikaze, and Hamakaze on training duty in the Bungo Channel, 16 October 1941

On 18 November 1941, Isokaze arrived in Saeki Bay alongside the rest of the 17th destroyer division to rendezvous with the six aircraft carriers of the Kido Butai - Akagi, Kaga, Sōryū, Hiryū, Shōkaku, and Zuikaku - along with their escorts. The intent of the mission was completely mysterious to the crews of the Japanese ships, and the goal was only made public after Isokaze and the others departed on 23 November, they were attacking Pearl Harbor. On 7 December, the Japanese carriers launched a series of air attacks that kickstarted the Pacific war, sinking the battleships USS Arizona and USS Oklahoma and wrecking the destroyers USS Cassin and USS Downes alongside damaging and temporarily sinking several more ships and destroying many aircraft during the raid. Isokaze then escorted the Kido Butai back to mainland Japan and returned to the Kure naval arsenal on the 24th. En route, Isokaze joined Hamakaze in attacking an enemy submarine, which they claimed to sink, but this was never confirmed. On 7 January 1942, Isokaze escorted the ammunition ship Nichiro Maru to Truk, then returned to Kure on the 14th, then escorted the 2nd replenishment unit for the Kido Butai during air strikes on Kavieng during the Rabaul landings, the raid on Port Darwin, and operations in the Java Sea.

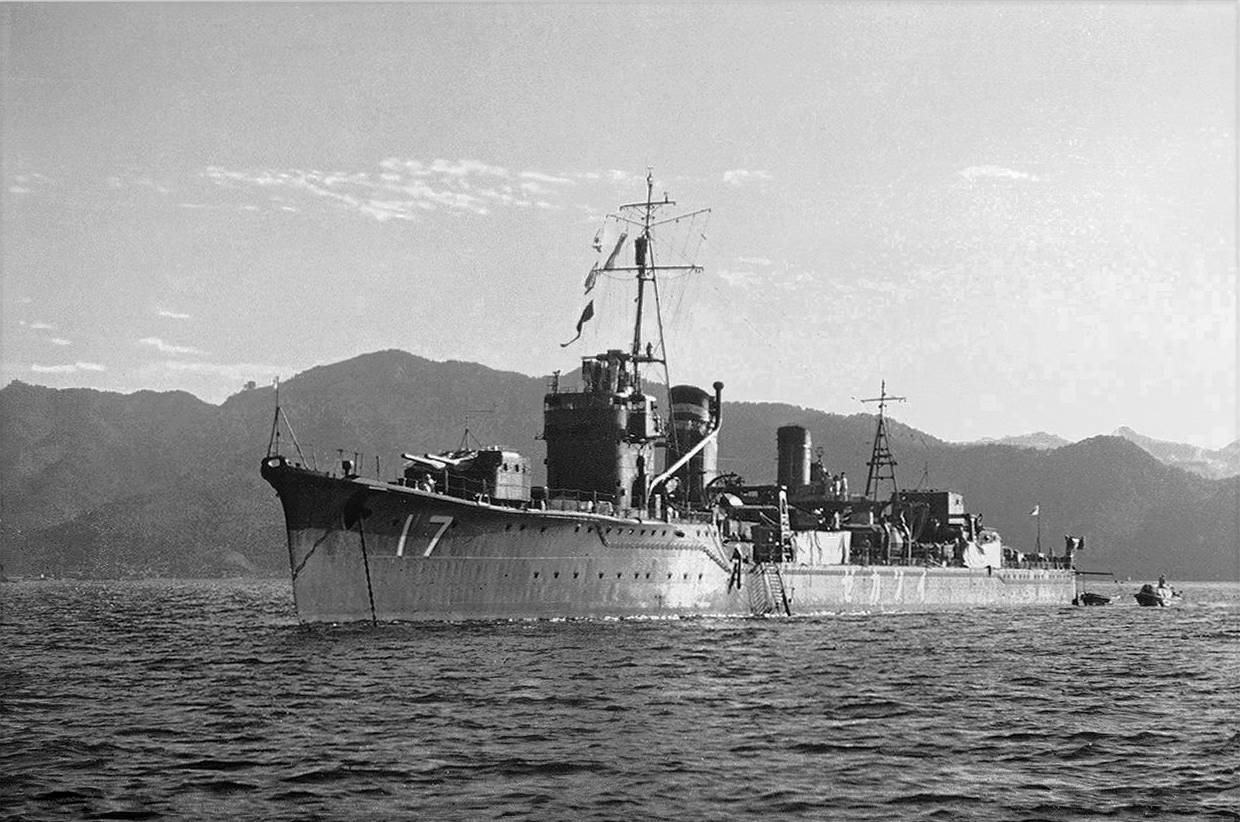
Isokaze anchored in Saeki Bay, 20 October 1941

On 1 March, Isokaze was operating alongside several destroyers of the 1st squadron when Japanese floatplanes spotted the 8,806-ton Dutch freighter Modjokerto at 10:40 and radioed her location to nearby Japanese naval units. Destroyer squadron 1 located Modjokerto at 11:25 and closed to point blank range, and a hail of 5-inch (127 mm) gunfire from Isokaze, Kagerō Shiranui, Kasumi, Ariake, and Yūgure sank the freighter in just 3 minutes with the loss of 42 men. On the 7th, Isokaze escorted the battleships Kongō and Haruna while they - joined by Urakaze and Tanikaze - bombarded and captured Christmas Island, then escorted the Kido Butai during the Indian Ocean Raid from 4-9 April where she engaged enemy aircraft twice and captured the crew of 6 from a downed flying-boat before transferring them to Akagi. The prisoners were treated with hospitality and a warm meal aboard the destroyer, something which was not transferred to the aircraft carrier. Isokaze finally arrived back at Kure on 27 April, and entered drydock from 5-15 May before departing for Hashirajima.

==== Battle of Midway ====
On 27 May, Isokaze and destroyer division 17 departed Hashirajima as an escort Akagi, Kaga, Sōryū, and Hiryū on a mission to attack Midway Island, not only to capture the Island but to lure out American aircraft carriers for a decisive action. Isokaze was specifically assigned to guard Sōryū. Japanese aircraft attacked Midway Island and destroyed several land facilities, but as the battle continued it became clear the Americans were aware of their attack as Admiral Nagumo ordered his carriers to rearm to naval weaponry, leaving the flattops exposed with thousands of pounds in explosives loaded in their hanger bay. The initial waves of aircraft from Midway Island and USS Hornet were thwarted, but at 10:26 a wave of dive bombers from attacked the Japanese carriers to devastating effect. A squadron of aircraft from USS Yorktown attacked Sōryū and hit the carrier with three 1,000 pound bombs and detonated her ammunition and blasted her into a floating wreck. The American aircraft then attacked Isokaze and a bomb near miss damaged the destroyer around her fantail and ruptured her fuel tanks but did not effect her sailing or navigation abilities. In the meantime, dive bombers from USS Enterprise crippled both Akagi and Kaga while the mangled Sōryū came to a stop at 10:40 and the abandon ship order was issued 5 minutes later, prompting Isokaze and Hamakaze to moor alongside the aircraft carrier to rescue survivors on the deck and forecastle, and together they evacuated 392 men and remained with the carrier for several hours. At 19:12, the order to scuttle Sōryū was radioed and Isokaze fired 3 torpedoes that delivered the Coup De Grace. Sōryū sank by the stern in 5 minutes as Isokaze and Hamakaze sailed away and patrolled in a 5,500 yard (5,000 meter) circle of the fatally wounded Akagi before she too was scuttled alongside Kaga by destroyer division 4 (Arashi, Nowaki, Maikaze, Hagikaze), which they sailed with to rejoin Nagumo's taskforce.

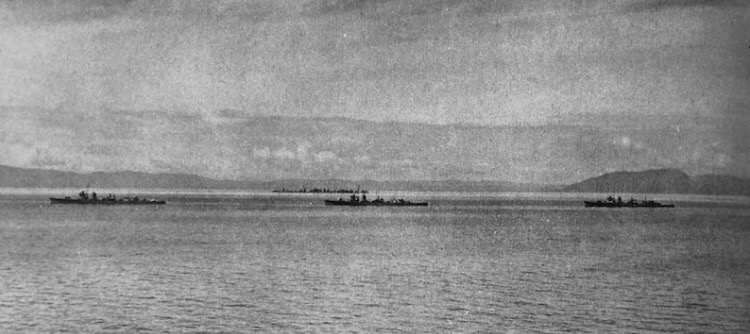
Isokaze, Tanikaze, and Hamakaze (R to L) anchored in Saeki Bay, November 1941

As the battle continued, Hiryū crippled Yorktown with a wave each of dive and torpedo bombers - enabling Yorktown to be finished off and the destroyer USS Hammann sunk by the Japanese submarine I-168 - but was in turn destroyed by dive bombers from Enterprise and similarly scuttled by escorting destroyers, before the heavy cruiser Mikuma was sunk by several waves of dive bombers from Enterprise and Hornet, ending the battle of Midway in a crippling allied victory that turned the tide of the war against Japan. On the 13th, Isokaze returned to Kure, then on the 22nd entered drydock for repairs, which lasted until July 2. Isokaze spent the rest of the month transiting between bases. On August 24, Isokaze joined the destroyers Kagerō, Kawakaze, Mutsuki, and Yayoi in bombarding Henderson Field. The next day, she escorted the troop convoy force during the battle of the Eastern Solomons, then saw a series of failed troop transport missions. After surviving an encounter with a B-17 bomber, Isokaze escorted a convoy to Rabaul, then on September 11 attempted a troop transport mission, but returned to Rabaul after her consort, the Yayoi, was sunk by B-17 bombers, before seeing several more successful troop transport mission, then in October engaged in patrol duty before escorting carriers at the battle of Santa Cruz on the 26th, then returned to Truk on the 30th. From November 2 to 7, Isokaze escorted damaged ships to Sasebo for repairs, before being drydocked herself until the 18th, then departed for Yokosuka for troop transport and training missions.

=== 1943 ===
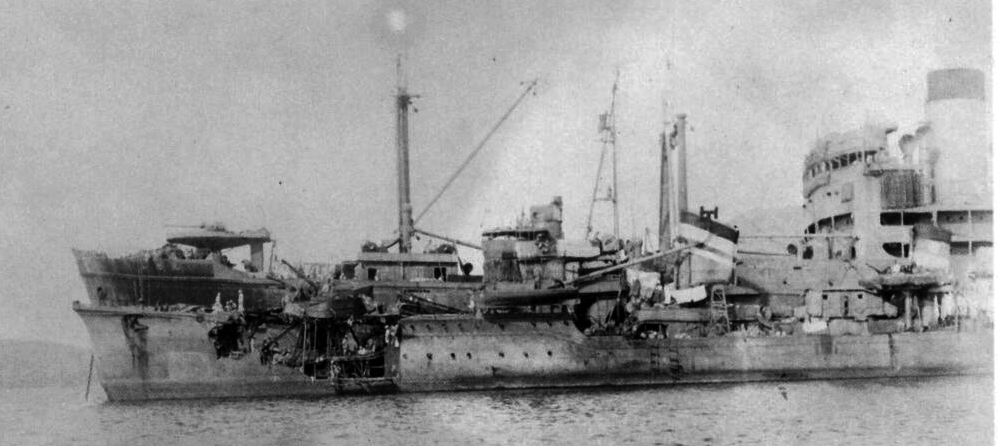
Isokaze moored against the repair ship Yamabiko Maru, 16 February 1943

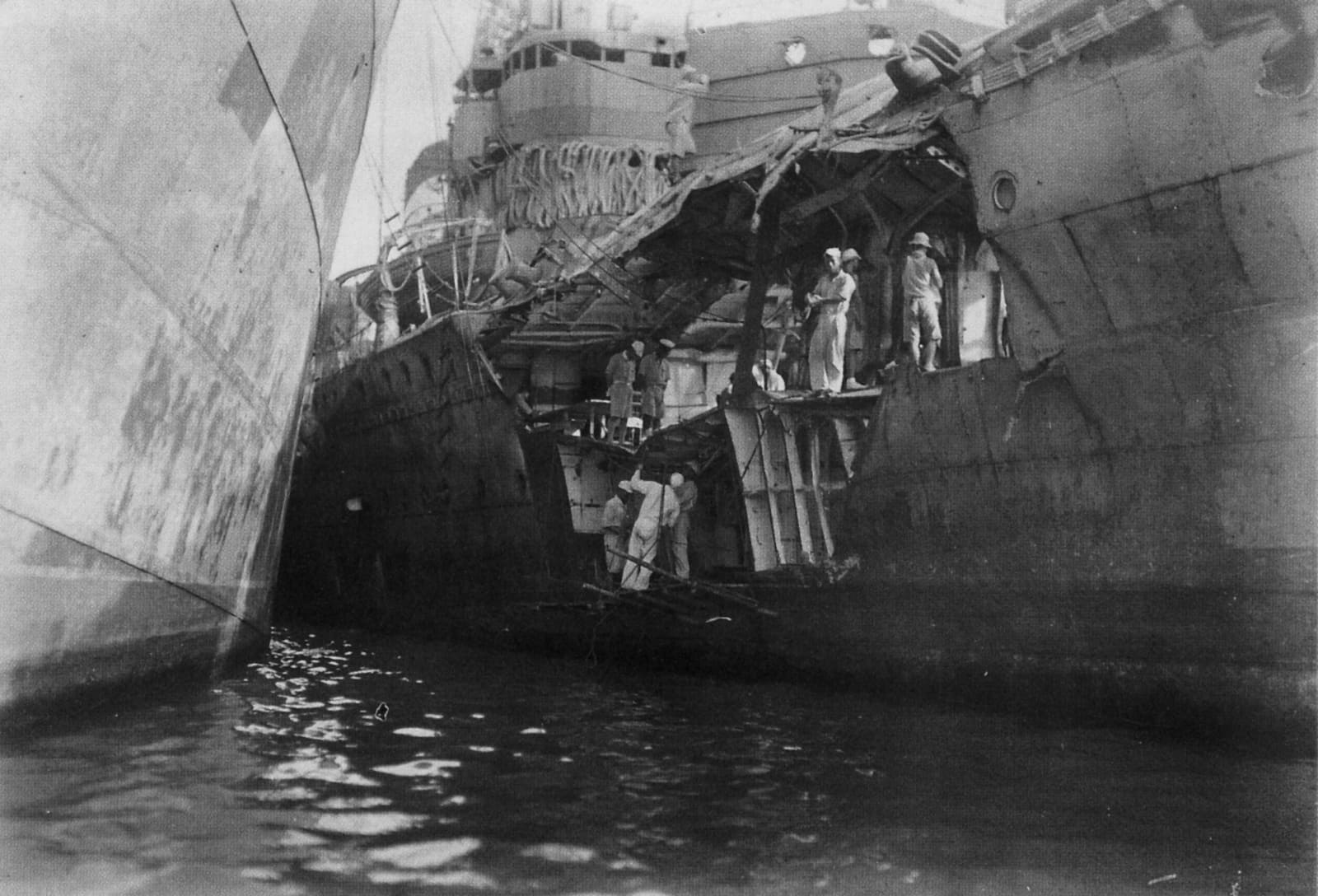
A close up of the damage to Isokaze's bow

At the start of January 1943, Isokaze survived B-17 bomber attacks, then departed with Rabaul to escort a large troop convoy to Lae and back. En route, the troop ships Myōkō Maru and Nichryu Maru were sunk by air attacks, but the rest of the ships completed their mission. On the 10th, while returning to Rabaul, the convoy was located by the submarine USS Argonaut which closed for an attack. Argonaut was the largest submarine in the world at the time and the largest the US would produce during the duration of the war at 381 feet (116 meters) long, 33 feet 9.5 in (10.3 meters) wide, and displacing 3,100 tons. Unfortunately, Argonaut would be spotted by a Japanese seaplane and bombed before being depth charged by Maikaze. This was initially to unknown effect as Isokaze sailed to the scene until a bow emerged from below the waves as Argonaut attempted to surface. Isokaze opened fire alongside Maikaze and together the two destroyers blasted the submarine with a hail of 5-inch (127 mm) shells until she disappeared with the loss of all 105 lives aboard, the largest loss of life aboard an American submarine.

The convoy arrived at Rabaul that night, and Isokaze spent the rest of the month on troop transport missions. At the beginning of February, the Japanese enacted Operation Ke. The Guadalcanal campaign was deemed a failure and a fleet of 20 destroyers was tasked with evacuating Japanese troops from the Island, including destroyer division 17. Isokaze successfully completed the first evacuation run on the 2nd and the next on the 4th, but on the third run on the 7th Isokaze was covering the evacuation units when she was attacked by a flight of land-based dive bombers in the afternoon. Isokaze opened fire and shot down one aircraft, but in exchange two 500 pound high-explosive bombs plunged into the destroyer's bow ahead of her turret one and blew out both sides of the hull, killing 10 of her crew. Isokaze straggled under her own power before being towed by the destroyer Kawakaze for assistance and arrived back to the Shortlands the next day where she was patched up. She limped to Rabaul where she was fixed up by the repair ship Yamabiko Maru and departed to Truk from 27 February to 2 March and after another patch up. The ship finally returned to Japan from 22-29 March where she was dry-docked in Kure for more permanent repairs over the course of several months. Isokaze returned to sea on 12 June and spent the rest of the month on training duties.

Throughout July, Isokaze departed on escorting duties, where she assisted the sinking seaplane tender Nisshin. On August 7, Isokaze was escorting a troop convoy alongside the destroyers Hamakaze, Shigure, and Sazanami when they were attacked by American destroyers in what became known as the battle of Horaniu. Isokaze successfully chased off the enemy destroyers with the help of the other Japanese ships, and in turn took a single 5-inch (127 mm) shell hit, causing minor damage. After repairs, Isokaze took part in more escorting duties and survived several air raids undamaged. At the start of October, Isokaze departed on an evacuation run from Kolombangara alongside eight other destroyers, but they were not alone. The destroyers USS Taylor, Ralph Talbot, and Terry were patrolling for Japanese barges when they stumbled upon Isokaze and three others. Terry fired the first shots followed by Ralph Talbot and Taylor, followed by Isokaze, Shigure, Samidare, and Minazuki responding with their own main guns, before briefly halting gunfire to unload their torpedoes. In the resulting gunfight, Samidare and Minazuki were hit but only light damaged while Isokaze remained untouched and the destroyers continued the transport missions without a loss, despite the Americans claiming a victory. On October 7, Isokaze was involved in the battle of Vella Lavella but was far away blinded by a rainsquall from the initial main action when saw the Japanese fatally wound the destroyer USS Chevalier and disable the destroyers USS Selfridge and USS O'Bannon while losing the destroyer Yūgumo. Isokaze instead only joined the destroyers Akigumo and Kazagumo in a long-range torpedo spread against what they thought were enemy cruisers, but were actually the damaged O'Bannon and sinking Chevalier, which failed to score any hits. During the rest of the month, Isokaze engaged in patrol duties around Truk, and on November 4 she struck a mine during convoy escorting duties which forced Isokaze to limp to Truk where she was docked for repairs for the rest of the year, during which her X turret was removed and replaced by AA guns.

=== 1944 ===
On January 2, 1944, Isokaze departed for Yokosuka, arriving on the next day, then for the rest of the month escorted the transport ship Asaka Maru between Japanese occupied Islands, then spent February and March on fleet patrol and convoy escorting duties. On March 29, Isokaze escorted the battleship Musashi when she was torpedoed by the submarine USS Tunny. Isokaze joined her sistership Urakaze in fending off Tunny with depth charge attacks, then escorted the battleship to repairs. Simultaneously, the destroyer Yukikaze was reassigned to the 17th destroyer division, which had still been going strong with all four ships, Isokaze, Urakaze, Tanikaze, and Hamakaze, still operating together since the beginning of the Pacific war. This came at the protest of Tanikaze's crew, as Yukikaze was beginning to gain a reputation as a "luck vampire", surviving battles completely undamaged as where other ships operating with her were damaged or sunk.

In early April, Isokaze escorted a convoy to Lingga, during which she badly damaged the submarine USS Scamp with depth charges, then spend the rest on the month on training duties, and on May 12 finally departed to escort Japanese warships to Tawitawi, then spend the rest of the month on patrol duties. On June 9, Isokaze departed alongside Tanikaze on submarine patrol duty, during which the Tanikaze crew's words about the Yukikaze seemed to prove true as underway Tanikaze was hit by two torpedoes fired from the submarine USS Harder and rapidly sank with half of her crew. Isokaze departed the scene to avoid being torpedoed, then later returned alongside Urakaze and assisted in rescuing 126 survivors. Tanikaze was the first loss of destroyer division 17. Isokaze dropped off survivors before escorting aircraft carriers at the battle of the Philippine Sea, where she rescued survivors from the sinking aircraft carrier Taihō, then survived attacks from American aircraft carriers. Isokaze returned to Japan after the battle and spend the rest of the month under maintenance, then throughout July took part in troop transport missions, and escorted troop convoys throughout August, and operated with the battleships Fusō and Yamashiro throughout September.

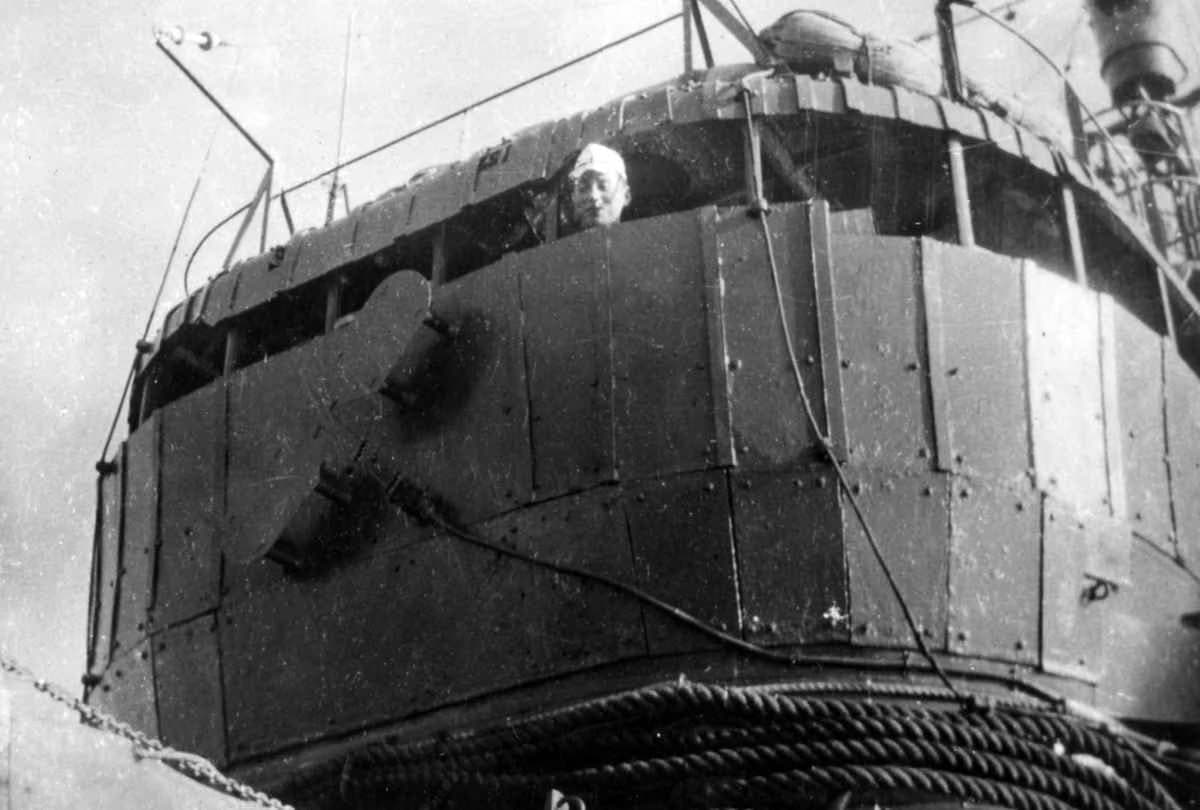
Isokaze's bridge photographed in Brunei bay shortly before the battle of Leyte Gulf, 21 October 1944

==== Battle of Leyte Gulf ====
After being drydocked for maintenance, Isokaze arrived at Brunei on October 20 as part of Admiral Kurita's center force in preparation for Operation Sho-Go, better known as the battle of Leyte Gulf, with the goal of attacking allied troop convoys destined for the Philippines. While in port Isokaze served as the main photography ship with Lieutenant Tobei Shiraishi taking many photos of the Japanese fleet at anchor, including of many warships which would not survive the battle. The fleet departed 2 days later, but on the 23rd, attacks by the submarines USS Darter and USS Dace sank the heavy cruisers Atago and Maya and crippled the heavy cruiser Takao, then the next day allied air attacks from aircraft carriers ensued. Isokaze escaped undamaged, but several other ships were damaged, and the battleship Musashi, victim of 17 bombs and 19-20 torpedoes, sank over nine hours.

Isokaze then took part in the fight against the escort carriers and destroyers of Taffy 3 the next day with Urakaze, Yukikaze, and the destroyer Nowaki; led by the light cruiser Yahagi. Isokaze fired torpedoes at the escort carriers but inflicted no damage, before she alone inspected the sinking destroyer USS Hoel, In some form of revenge of US pilots strafing Japanese survivors, Isokaze's crew wished to machine gun the US sailors evacuating the ship. Captain Maeda, while half considering it, ultimately gave into his conscious and ordered an attack off, but Isokaze steamed off without rescuing survivors. Isokaze with the other destroyers then engaged the already crippled destroyer USS Johnston. The resulting gunfire destroyed her remaining turret and her remaining boilers and engine; exploded in her bridge, radio room, and superstructure; blew off her forward funnel; damaged her forward torpedo mount; detonated AA guns and ammunition, delivering the Coup De Grace as Johnston sank an 45 minutes later. After the Japanese ships retreated, Isokaze evaded further air attacks without damage, and returned to Brunei on the 28th, enroute being refueled by the battleship Nagato.

In November, the Japanese fleet finally retreated from the Philippines to dash to mainland Japan, where enroute on the 21st, the battleship Kongō and Isokaze's consort throughout the entire war, the Urakaze, were torpedoed and sunk by the submarine USS Sealion, the later with all hands, prompting Isokaze to rescue Kongō survivors. On the 28th, Isokaze was tasked with escorting the incomplete aircraft carrier Shinano through the inland sea. The next day, Shinano was torpedoed and sunk by the submarine USS Archerfish, prompting Isokaze to rescue survivors. Isokaze then spent the rest of the year docked at Kure for maintenance.

=== 1945 ===
On January 8, 1945, Isokaze escorted the Hamakaze, which had been damaged in a collision, to Mako for repairs, then the next day was attacked by American carrier aircraft, but was not damaged. From the 12th to 18th, she escorted the light carrier Ryūhō to Kure, then afterwards joined Hamakaze in training duties until the end of February. Throughout March, Isokaze was for the most part locked in Kure due to American air attacks.

==== Operation Ten Go ====
Heading into April, an invasion of Okinawa by allied forces was imminent, and while the navy was initially contempt with reserving the handful of ships it possessed for the seemingly inevitable invasion of mainland Japan, Emperor Hirohito requested the navy to do something. Not wanting to disappoint their ruler, the Japanese hatched up a plan, the battleship Yamato was to depart on a one way mission to beach herself on the island to act as a stationary, unsinkable gun fortress to sink US troop ships. Isokaze was one of nine escorts tasked with ensuring Yamato made it to her destination, alongside seven other destroyers and the light cruiser Yahagi. The plan was named Operation Ten Go.

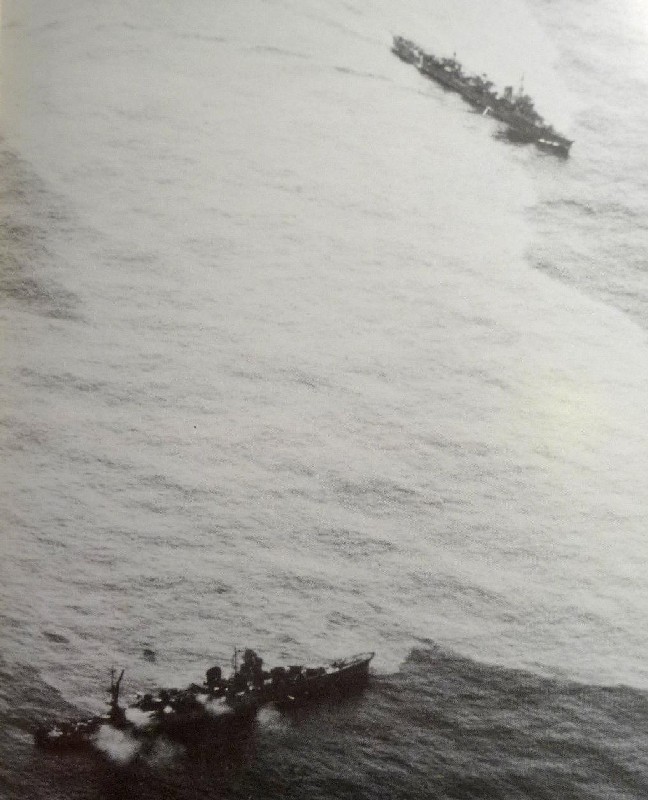
Isokaze attempting to assist the crippled Yahagi, a maneuver that sealed her fate

Isokaze departed Japan on April 6, 1945, and spent the next few hours practicing torpedo runs on Yamato along with the other destroyers. However, soon afterwards the force was spotted by American aircraft, and tracked by floatplanes for the rest of the day and into the 7th, until noon when the force was attacked by nearly 400 warplanes from American aircraft carriers. Isokaze managed to evade the first several attacks, until noticing Yahagi dead in the water due to a torpedo hit that destroyed her engine room. Rather than fend for herself, Isokaze attempted to assist the crippled Yahagi - despite the cruiser signaling her to turn away - which proved to spell her doom as dive bombers from the light carriers USS Bataan and USS Belleau Wood noticed the slowing Isokaze, pounced on the easy target, and flooded her engine room a crippling near miss. Isokaze quickly became unnavigable and attempted to withdraw from the engagement at 12 knots, but over two and a half hours the flooding slowly overwhelmed the destroyer until she finally lost steering and went dead in the water. Yukikaze removed Isokaze's crew then scuttled her with gunfire, bringing an end to Isokaze's story.

Isokaze's wreckage was located in an underwater survey in May 2016, but the news was not made public until February 10, 2018. She is the only one of Yamato's escorts to have been discovered.

== Photography ==
A series of photographs was taken by Isokaze of the Japanese fleet anchored in Brunei shortly before the battle of Leyte Gulf, 21-22 October 1944 and a few directly during the battle.

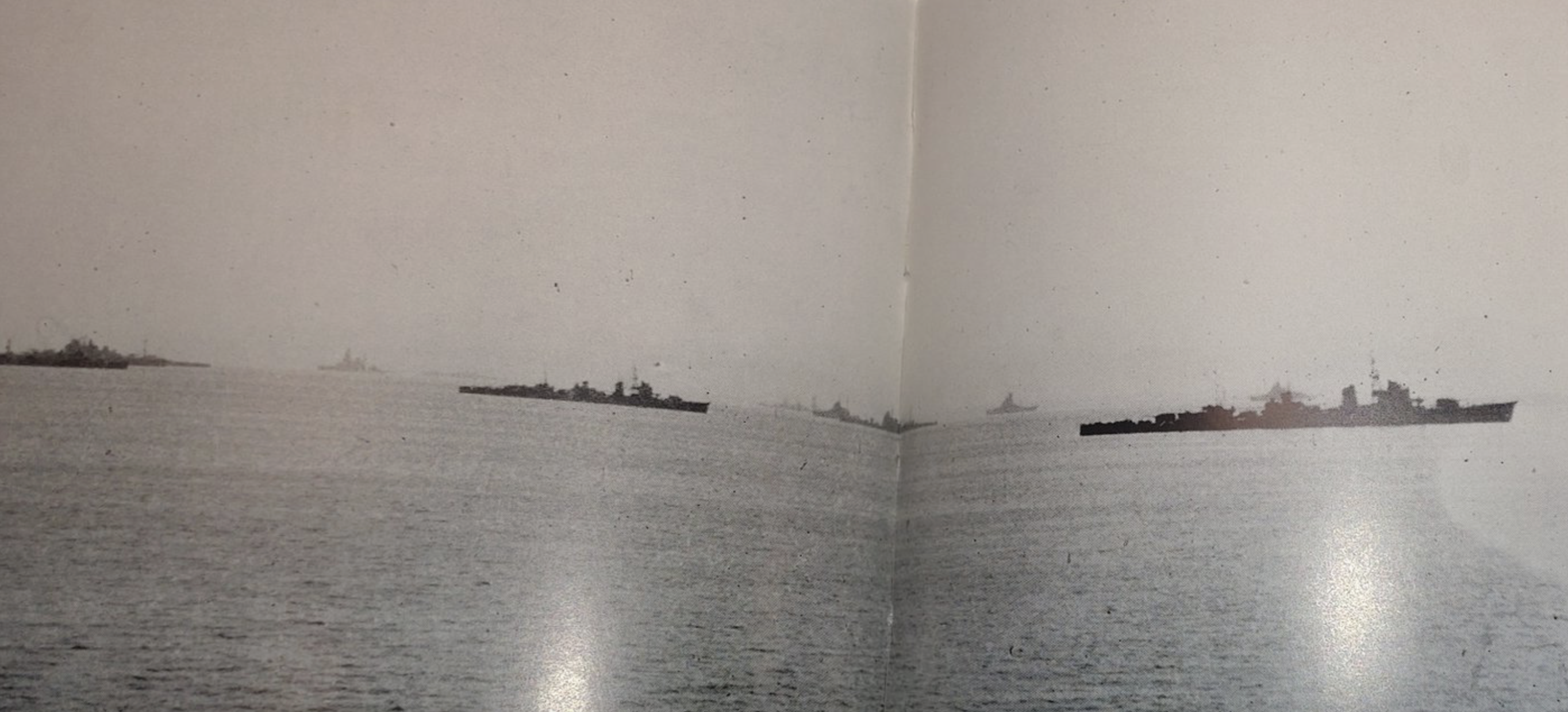
Destroyer division 17 teammates Urakaze, Hamakaze, and Yukikaze (R to L)

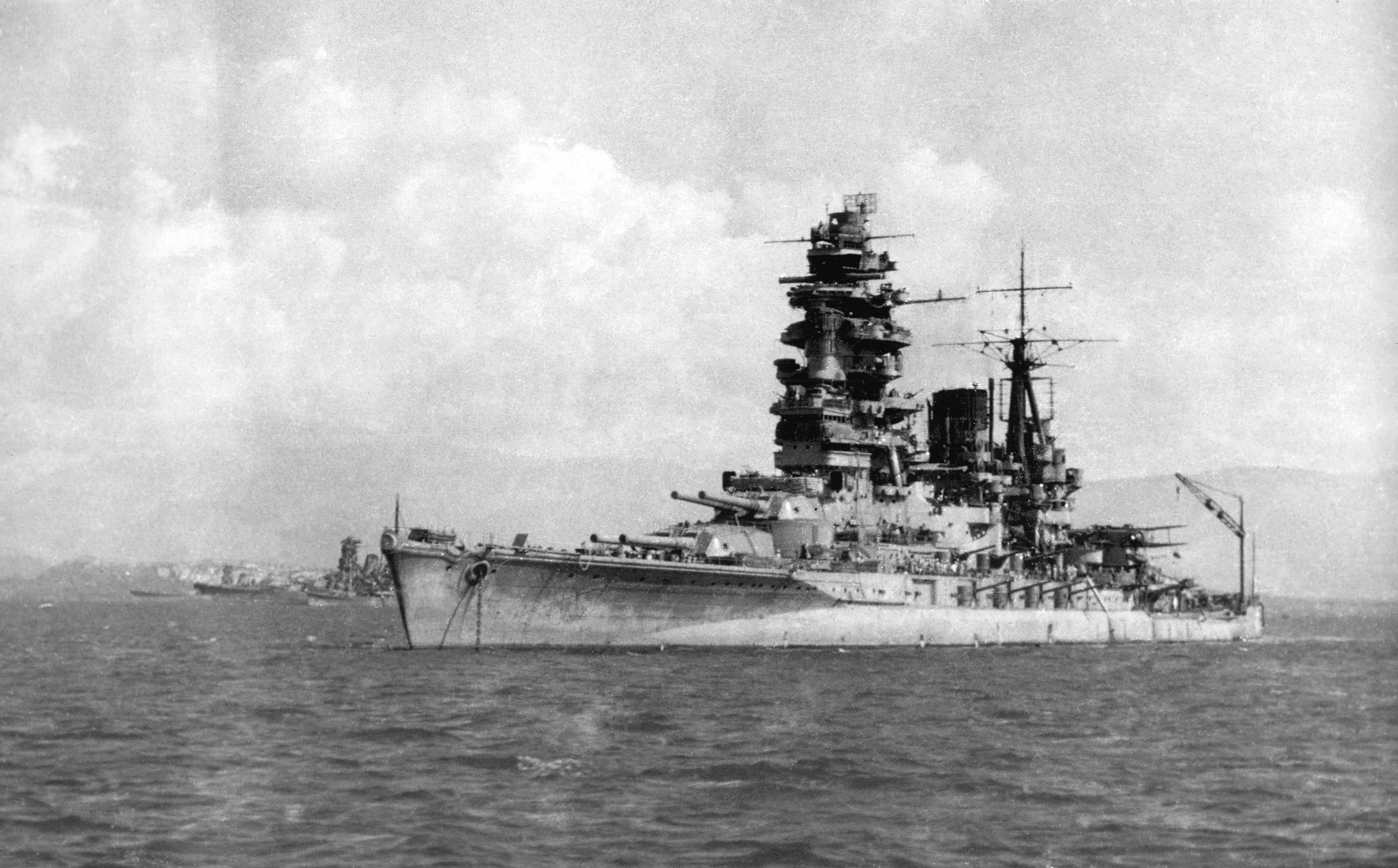
The battleship Nagato (behind her is Mogami, Yamato, and Musashi)

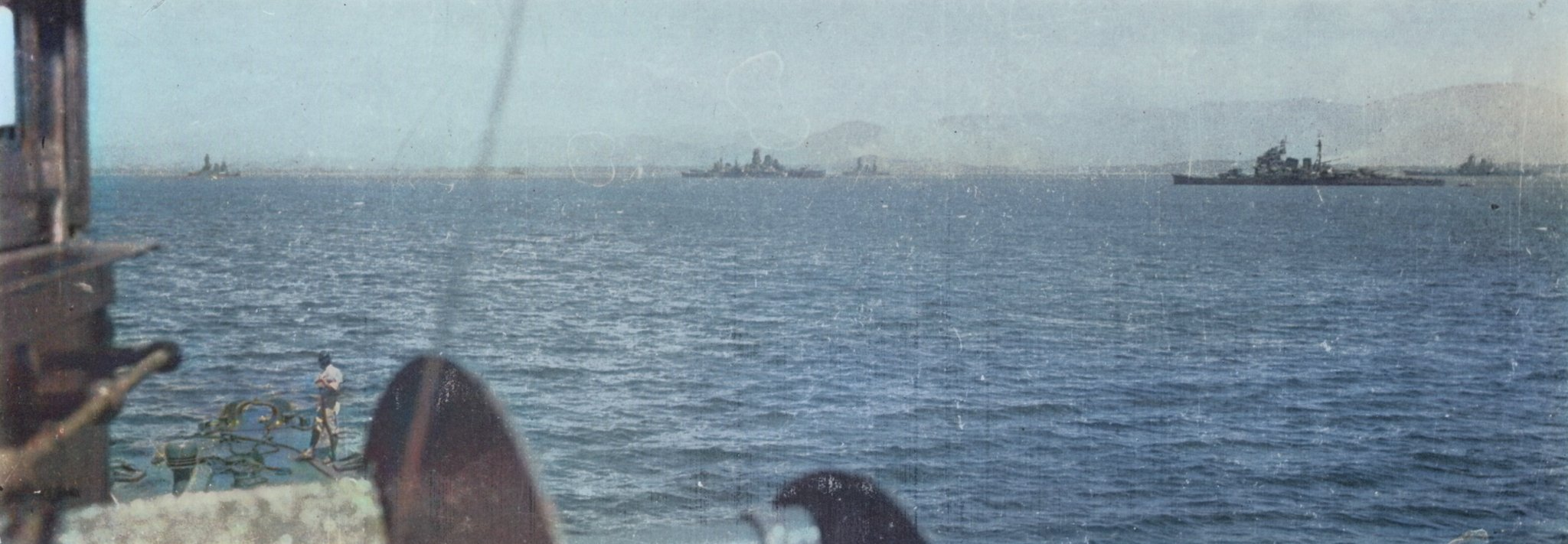
Fusō, Mogami, Yamato, Yamashiro, Chōkai, and Musashi (L to R). Isokaze's bridge and bow is visible

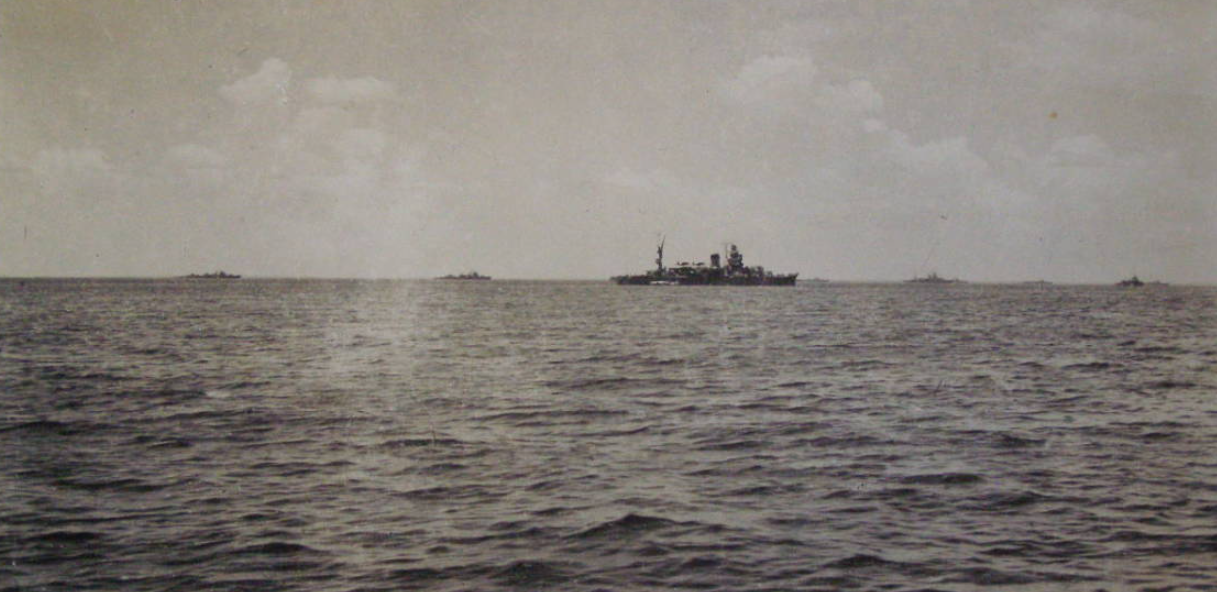
The light cruiser Yahagi. The destroyer Nowaki is anchored ahead, and the light cruiser Noshiro is seen in the distance

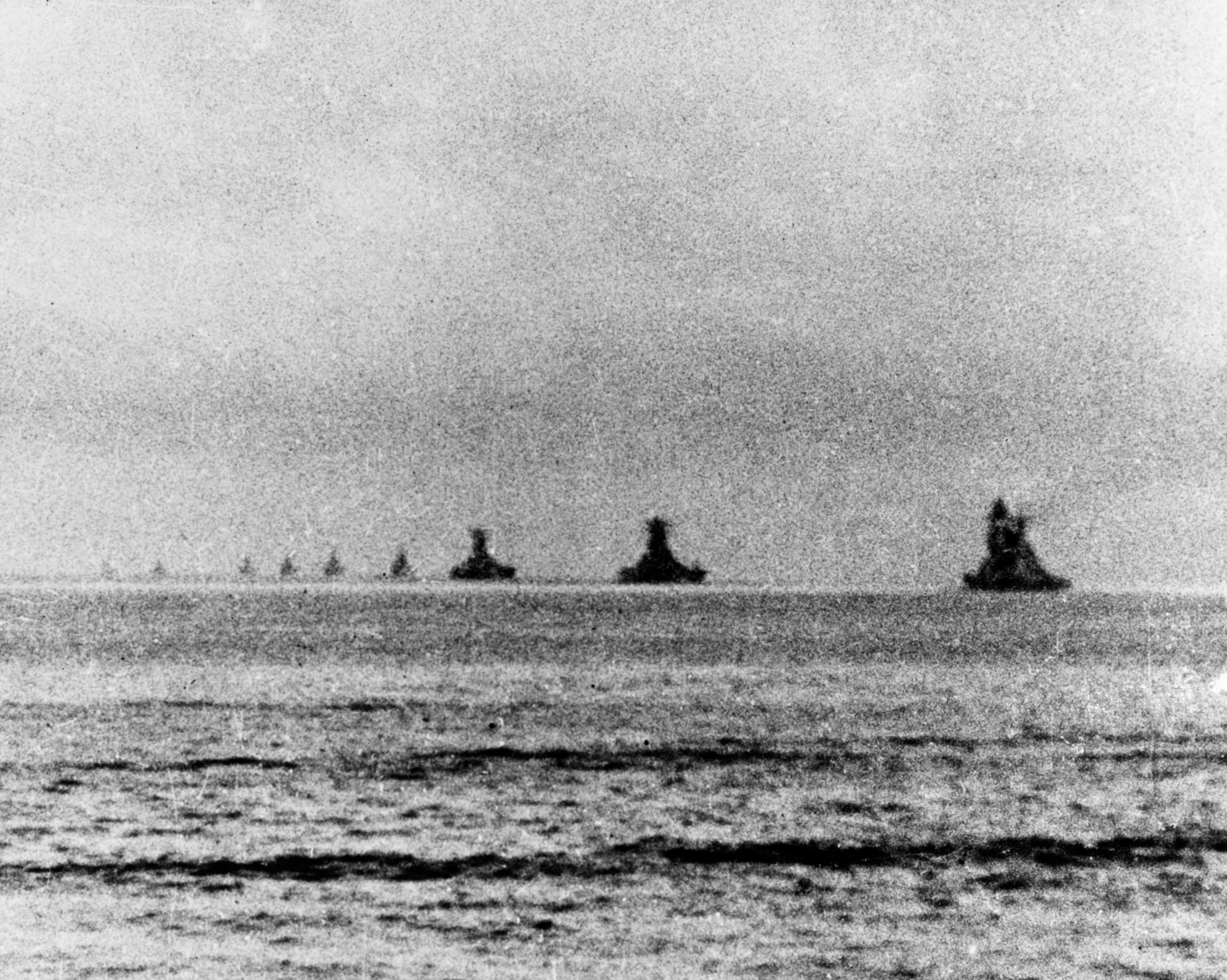
The Japanese center force leaving Brunei, 22 October 1944

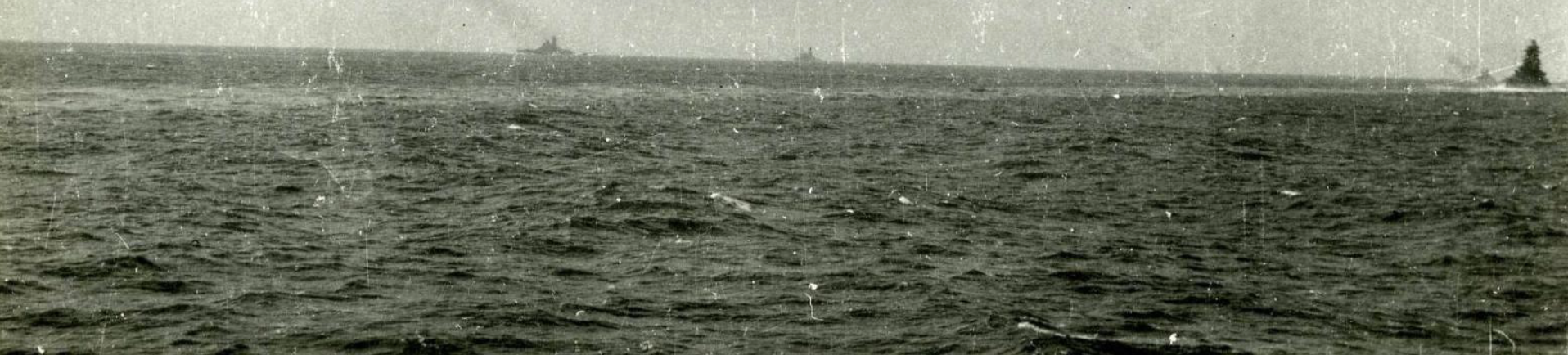
Yamato, Musashi, and Nagato underway

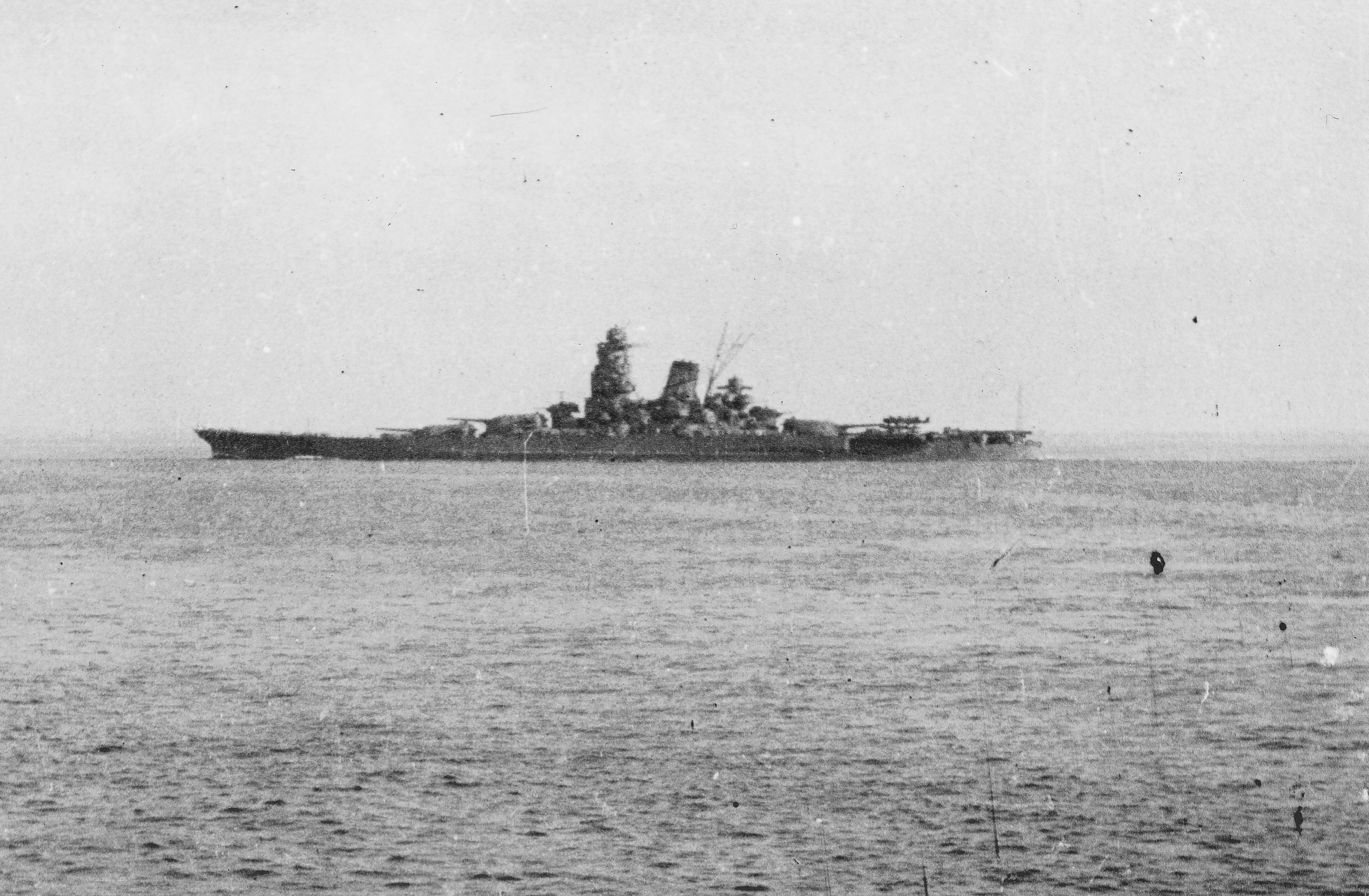
Musashi departing Brunei

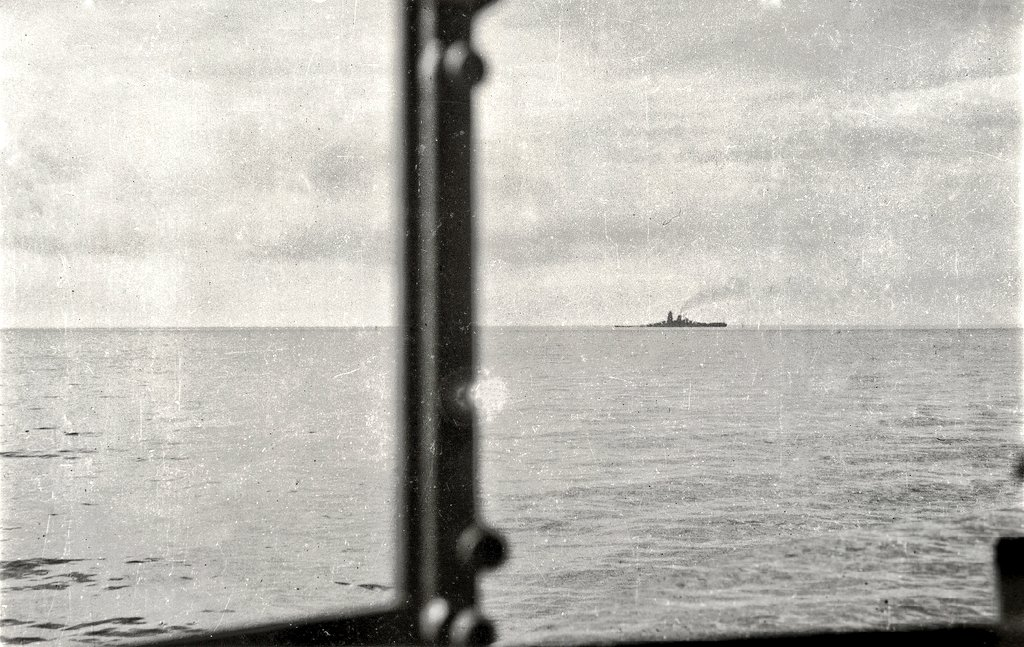
Musashi minutes before sinking, taken from inside Isokaze's bridge, 24 October 1944
