= USS Archerfish =

Two submarines of the United States Navy have been named Archerfish, after the archerfish.

- USS Archerfish (SS-311), was a Balao-class submarine, commissioned in 1943 and decommissioned in 1946.
- USS Archerfish (SSN-678), was a Sturgeon-class nuclear-powered submarine, in service from 1971 to 1998.
